= RC Commercial High School =

RC Commercial High School, founded as Ranchhodlal Chhotalal High School, is one of the oldest high school of Gujarat, located in Ahmedabad.

== History ==
The school was founded in 1846 by Ranchhodlal Chhotalal and was the second English medium school and high school of the city after the Tuljaram Sakharam High School, which was founded in 1824. The school conducted an entrance test for admission and many elite mill owners and eminent personalities lined up for admission at this school

In 1904, the foundation of a new building with infrastructure for the school was laid by Lord Lamington. The infrastructure had badminton and tennis courts, as well as a gymnasium for students' all-around physical development. Students could also learn French, Sanskrit and Persian and a hostel catered to those coming from far away.

In 1967, the school was taken over by the local government and converted into a Gujarati-medium school lost its prominence.

== Present status ==
Currently, it is run by the government as Gujarati-medium high school and is known as RC Commerce High School.

== Alumnus ==
Among its notable alumni include Shrenik Kasturbhai and Arvind Narottambhai of Lalbhai group and Arvind Mills. U.R. Chhipa, who played Cricket for Pakistan, and Jasu Patel, who played for India, also studied here. Ganesh Vasudev Mavalankar was also alumni of this school. Congress leader Ahsan Jafri was also alumni of the school, who also edited the Urdu magazine published by the school in his time.
