= Shrenik Kasturbhai Lalbhai =

Indian industrialist and philanthropist

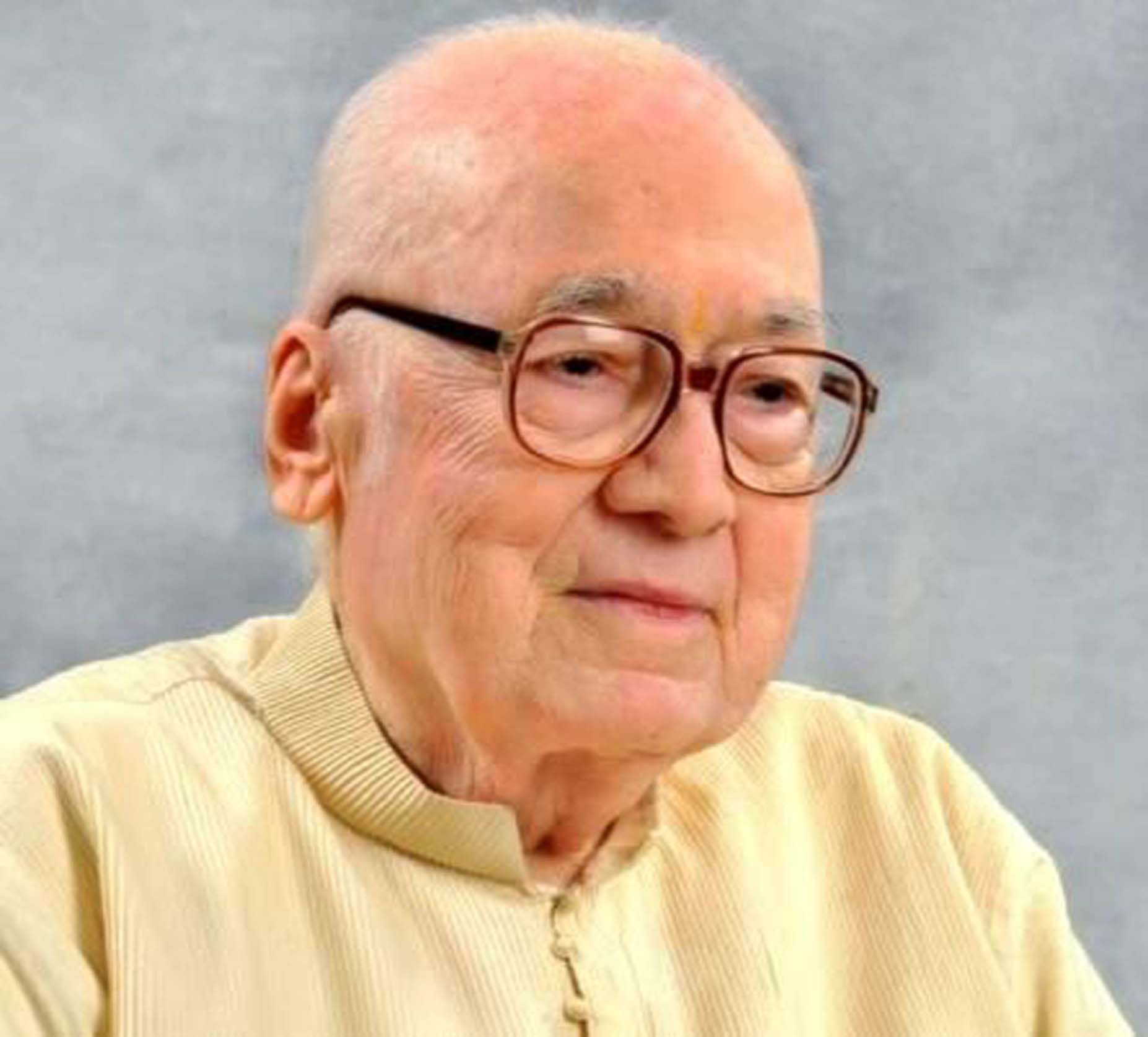
- Shrenik Kastubhai Lalbhai at Gujarat Vishwakosh Trust
- Born: 28 December 1925
- Died: 19 June 2014 (aged 88); Ahmedabad, India
- Citizenship: Indian
- Education: Chemical Engineering and MBA
- Alma mater: Ranchhodlal Chhotalal Government High School, MIT, Harvard University
- Occupations: Industrialist, educationist, philanthropist
- Organization(s): Lalbhai Group of Companies, Arvind Mills
- Spouse: Pannaben
- Children: Sanjay, Kalpana
- Parent(s): Kasturbhai Lalbhai, Shardaben
- Relatives: Shantidas Jhaveri

Shrenik Kasturbhai Lalbhai (28 December 1925 – 19 June 2014) was an Indian industrialist and philanthropist. After completing courses of study at the Massachusetts Institute of Technology and Harvard University in the United States, he joined the family business, a conglomerate of companies spanning multiple industries. He also served on the governing councils of a number of cultural, educational and religious institutions.

== Family ==
Lalbhai was born to the Jain Nagarsheth family of Ahmedabad, and was a direct descendant of Shantidas Jhaveri, a royal jeweller of Mughal emperors. Khushalchand (1680–1748), the grandson of Shantidas, paid ransom to the Marathas to save Ahmedabad from plunder in 1725. Khushalchand's son Vakhatchand (1740–1814) was also a noted businessman.

Lalbhai's great grandfather, Dalpatbhai Bhagubhai, became involved in cotton trading in the 1870s. His grandfather Lalbhai Dalpatbhai (1863–1912) founded the Saraspur cotton mill in 1896, adding cotton processing to the family's precious gems business. His father, Kasturbhai Lalbhai, was an industrialist and philanthropist. He was active in politics before and after India's independence. Kasturbhai was co-founder of several companies that eventually turned into the Lalbhai Group, including Arvind Mills, Atul Chemicals and Anil Starch.

== Early life ==
Shrenik was born on 28 December 1925, the youngest son of Kasturbhai Lalbhai. He completed his secondary education at Navi Gujarati Shala and Ranchhoddas Chhotalal High School in Ahmedabad. He studied for two years at Gujarat College and then transferred to the Massachusetts Institute of Technology (MIT) to study chemical engineering. After receiving his bachelor's degree from MIT, he received his master's degree in business from Harvard University, graduating in 1948. He married Pannaben and the couple had a son, Sanjay, and a daughter, Kalpana.

== Career ==
After completing his education, Shrenikbhai joined the Lalbhai Group of Companies. For the first five years, while working in various departments of the family companies, he also devoted substantial time to helping the group resolve government allegations of illicit marketing practices and tax evasion in 1948–49. He eventually headed Deepak Nitrite Ltd and a number of other Lalbhai Group companies. He served as director of Nirma Limited, Anukul Investments, Able Investments, Animesh Holdings, Sonalank Investment and Gujarat Industrial Investment Corporation.

Shrenikbhai served on the boards of several educational, cultural, industrial and religious organizations, including Ahmedabad Education Society (AES), Gujarat Vishwakosh Trust, Gujarat Museum Society, Jain Visa Oswal Club, CEPT University, NID, Indian Space Research Organization, Nirma University, Institute of Plasma Research, IIMA, Ahmedabad Textile Industries Research Association, Lalbhai Dalpatbhai Institute of Indology and the Institute of Jainology. He also served as a trustee of the Sabarmati Ashram Preservation and Memorial Trust.

He developed an expertise on the history of Jainism and headed the Anandji Kalyanji Trust, which has restored and preserved more than 1200 Jain temples, including the Palitana Jain temples.

== Death ==
Shrenikbhai suffered from myasthenia gravis during his life. He died on 19 June 2014 at his residence Koteshwar, located in the Bhat area of Ahmedabad, and was cremated at the Thaltej crematorium.
