= Kasturbhai Lalbhai =

Indian industrialist and philanthropist

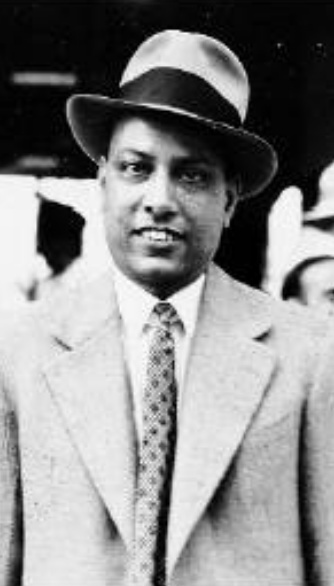
- Kasturbhai in the 1940s before adopting khadi clothes
- Born: 19 December 1894; Ahmedabad, Bombay Presidency, British Raj
- Died: 20 January 1980 (aged 85); Ahmedabad, Gujarat, India
- Citizenship: India
- Education: Metric
- Alma mater: Ranchhodlal Chhotalal Government High School
- Occupation: Industrialist
- Years active: 1912–1977
- Organization: Arvind Mills
- Spouse: Sharda Chimanlal Jhaveri
- Children: Shrenik, Siddharth
- Parent(s): Mohini and Lalbhai Dalpatbhai
- Awards: Padma Bhushan

Kasturbhai Lalbhai (19 December 1894 – 20 January 1980) was an Indian industrialist and philanthropist. He co-founded Arvind Mills along with his brothers and several other institutes. He was a co-founder of the Ahmadabad Education Society which later founded Ahmedabad University and the Indian Institute of Management Ahmedabad. Kasturbhai served as the chairman of the historic and influential Anandji Kalyanji Jain Trust, that manages Shatrunjaya and several other Jain pilgrimage centers, for 50 years.

== Early life ==
Kasturbhai Lalbhai was born in 1894 in Zaveriwad, Ahmedabad, Gujarat, to Mohini and Lalbhai Dalpatbhai, a member of a preeminent Jain family.

He studied at Municipal School Number Eight near Teen Darwaja, Ahmedabad up to fifth grade. He later joined Ranchhodlal Chhotalal Government High School. He matriculated in 1911 with second class. In 1912, when he was a 17-year-old studying in Gujarati College, his father died and being the second son, he was asked to discontinue his studies so as to help in the family business. His father Lalbhai had divided property among his brothers only in the recent past; as his and his sons' share, Lalbhai had received Raipur mills, a new establishment.

He was married to Sharda Chimanlal Jhaveri in May 1915 and had two sons, Shrenik and Siddharth.

== Family ==
Kasturbhai belonged to the Jain family of Nagarsheths (city chief) of Ahmedabad, recognized by the Mughals, Marathas and the English during different times.

He was the descendant of Shantidas Jhaveri, a royal jeweler of Akbar and an Oswal Jain from the Marwar region. Khushalchand (1680–1748), the grandson of Shantidas paid ransom to the Marathas to save Ahmedabad from plunder in 1725. Khushalchand's son Vakhatchand (1740–1814) was also a noted businessman. His grandson Dalpatbhai Bhagubhai was also in cotton trading business in the 1870s. His son Lalbhai Dalpatbhai (1863–1912), Kasturbhai's father, established Saraspur cotton mill in 1896 addition to the traditional business of precious gems. It became a part of the swadeshi movement in India.

== Business ==
He joined Raipur Mill as chairman in 1912. The operations of the mill had not yet stabilized; hence, Kasturbhai had to take care of operations closely. He started off as a timekeeper in the mill, but fed up with the repetitive nature of the job, he started working with suppliers of the mill and traveled far and wide to understand the supplier market. The boom in demand during and post-World War I helped him in stabilizing the operations of the firm. He joined the board of directors of Raipur mill in 1918. Later he established Ashoka Mills in the 1920s with the help of Dahyabhai Patel. Kasturbhai expanded his business with help of his mentor and trusted general manager of all his textile mills, Dahyabhai Motilal Patel, who had the vision and insight to advise Kasturbhai to invest in or acquire five mills between 1924 and 1938, including four belonging to relatives. These include establishment of Arvind Mills and Nutan Mills in 1931, Aruna Mills in 1928, Ahmedabad New Cotton Mills in 1938. Swadeshi movement by Mahatma Gandhi in the 1930s and starting of World War II in 1939 helped textile industry in India. He modernised all seven mills. They had 12% of India's total spinning capacity and 24% of Ahmedabad's total weaving capacity resulting in they were seventh largest cotton consumer in 1939 in India.

In 1948, his business group was named in the list of business houses indulging in black-marketing. R. K. Shanmukham Chetty, the finance minister and a friend of Kasturbhai had to resign for reportedly suggesting that its name be dropped from the list. The Income Tax department followed its allegations with a spate of inquiries and after almost ten years, absolved the group of any wrongdoing.

In 1952, his trusted advisor and general manager, Dahyabhai Motilal Patel, helped strategise and found Atul Limited (literally, 'incomparable'), India's first modern dyestuff manufacturer, in collaboration with American Cyanamid Company. It was inaugurated by the first prime minister, Jawaharlal Nehru.

== Politics ==
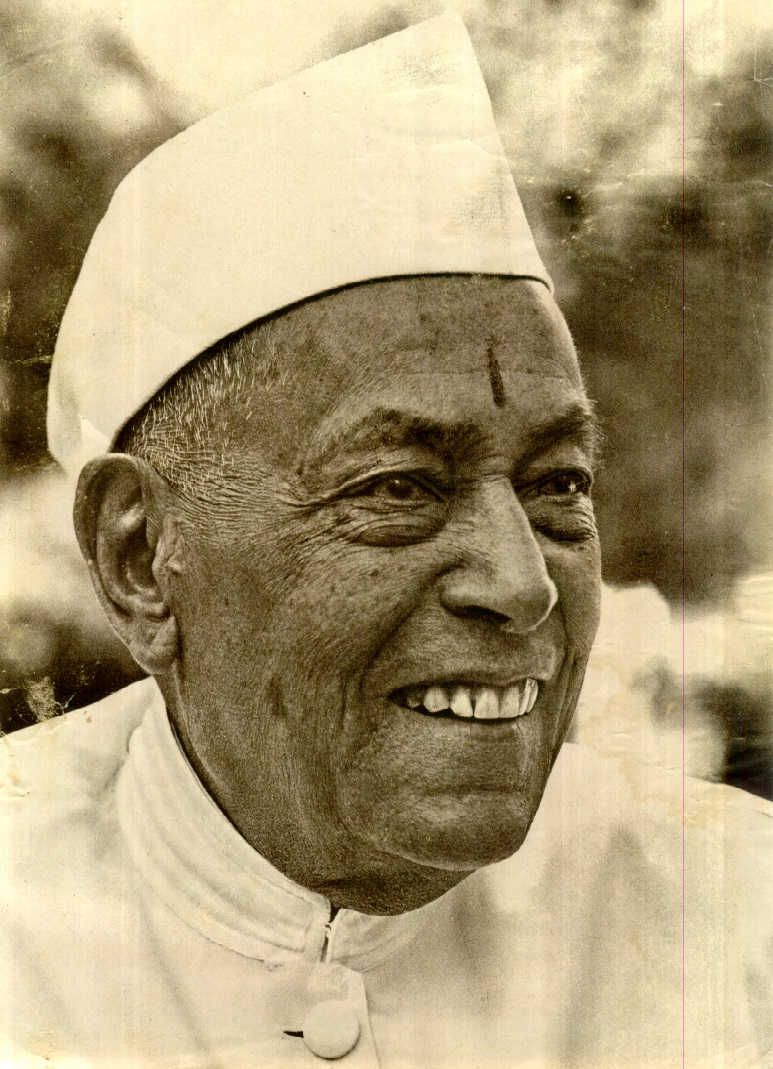
Kasturbhai Lalbhai wearing Khadi clothes

He was elected in Central Legislative Assembly in December 1923. During his three-year term, he was involved in lobbying for Indian industries including repeal of excise duty on textiles. During the 1930s, he became close to Mahatma Gandhi and helped him in the Swadeshi movement, which boycotted foreign goods and promoted local industries. He was also indulged in negotiation of taxes with British for Indian textiles during economic depression of the 1930s.

He held several important positions after independence of India, including Advisory Committee on Fundamental Rights, Minorities and the Administration of Tribal and Excluded Areas in 1947, chairmanship of the Economic Committee of the Ministry of Finance in 1948, chairmanship of Central Public Works Department Industry Committee in 1952, chairmanship of National Research Development Corporation, member of Council of Scientific and Industrial Research, trustee of Gandhi Smarak Nidhi, member of Indian Investment Centre. He also became the trustee and chairman of Mahatma Gandhi Memorial Fund. He also served as a member of Minorities Sub-committee as a representative of Jainism.

== Institution building ==
Kasturbhai was elected as the President of Federation of Indian Chamber of Commerce and Industries in 1934 and the President of Ahmedabad Textile Mill Owners Association in 1935. From 1937 to 1949, he served as the Director of Reserve Bank of India.

He along with Amritlal Hargovinddas, Ganesh Mavlankar started the Ahmadabad Education Society (AES) in 1936, which later evolved into Ahmedabad University in 2009. Later this society started several educational institutes including MG Science College, L M College of Pharmacy. AES assisted the other educational institutions by donating the land to the institutes like Physical Research Laboratory, Indian Space Research Organisation, CEPT, Castrol AES Monitoring Institute, Blind Men's Association giving training to the Blind persons. Vikram Sarabhai Community Science Center, Gujarat Vishwa Kosh, and others. HL College of Commerce had the privilege to house Gujarat University in its building in the initial years. AES had also donated Rs 0.5 Million for the establishment of Gujarat University. AES also helped establish cultural center like Amdavad ni Gufa.

He and Vikram Sarabhai established Ahmedabad Textile Industries Research Association (ATIRA) before independence under Ahmedabad Textile Mill owners Association for promoting research in field of textiles.

AES also donated land for the establishment of the Indian Institute of Management Ahmedabad (IIMA). Kasturbhai along with Vikram Sarabhai were instrumental in it. He was on the board of IIMA but declined to accept the position of its chairman. Now IIMA has Kasturbhai Lalbhai Management Development Centre and a Kasturbhai Lalbhai Chair in Entrepreneurship.

To promote engineering and technology, he founded an engineering college in 1947 and named it after his father, Lalbhai Dalpatbhai College of Engineering. He also established the Lalbhai Dalpatbhai Institute of Indology in 1962.

In 1949, he founded the Gujarat Chamber of Commerce and Industries (GCCI). From 1955 to 1965, he was a chairman of Indian Institute of Technology (IIT). He founded the Lalbhai Dalpatbhai Institute of Indology in 1962 which preserves many manuscripts, rare books, and microfilms. In 1972, Sankat Nivaran Society was founded by Gujarat Chamber of Commerce and Industries and Ahmedabad Textile Mills Owners' Association.

He commissioned world-renowned architects such as Louis Kahn, Le Corbusier, B. V. Doshi and Charles Correa to design some of these institutes and bring modern architecture in Ahmedabad.

== Later life ==
With time, Kasturbhai started handing over the operations of his businesses to his family in the 1960s. He devoted more time to public activities. He retired from business in January 1977. He died on 20 January 1980 in Ahmedabad.

== Religious activities ==
He was a strict Jain. He became chairman of Anandji Kalyanji Trust in 1925 at the age of 30 years and served for 50 years. It has many Jain temples under its management. Under him, the trust renovated many Jain temples including temples at Ranakpur, Dilwara (at Mount Abu), Girnar, Taranga and Shatrunjaya Hills.

== Recognition ==
He was awarded the Padma Bhushan, India's third highest civilian honour in 1969 by the Government of India.

Amar Chitra Katha released a book on Kasturbhai Lalbhai in 2025 titled as 'Weaving The Nation's Future. https://digital.amarchitrakatha.com/id008096064/Kasturbhai-Lalbhai. It covers the life and journey of him and shows his contribution in the nation building on the industrial and social fronts.

== See also ==
- Arvind Mills
- Lalbhai Dalpatbhai

ATUL.LTD. VALSAD
