= Anandji Kalyanji Trust =

Largest and the oldest Jain trust

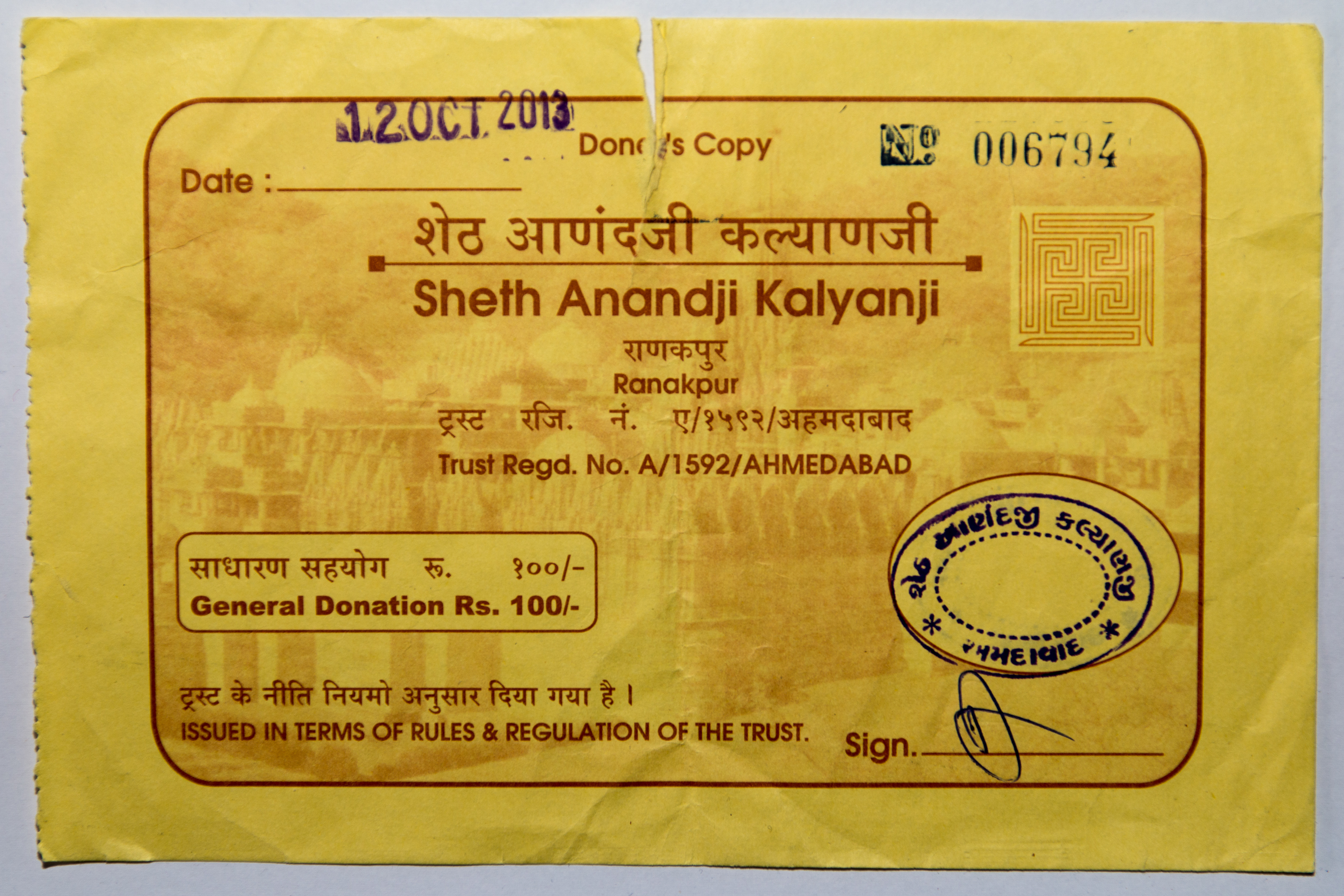
Shet Anandji Kalyanji Trust Donation Receipt

Anandji Kalyanji Trust (Gujarati શેઠ આનંદજી કલ્યાણજી પેઢી) is the largest and the oldest Jain trust, managed by lay Jains, with headquarters at Ahmedabad which manages more than 1200 Jain temples. The original charitable trust is said to have been founded somewhere in decades of 1630–40 AD and is running under name Anandji Kalyanji ni Pedhi or Anandji Kalyanji Trust since decade of 1720.

== History ==
Initially founded to manage the Shatrunjaya Palitana temples, it now manages numerous Jain tirthas and temples belonging to the Śvetāmbara tradition. It is said to have been founded by Shantidas Zaveri and its leadership has been in the same family for generations, who have been the Nagar-seths of Ahmedabad. Kasturbhai Lalbhai, an industrialist and educationist, who was the eleventh generation member, headed the trust for 50 years, followed by Shrenik Kasturbhai Lalbhai for 30 years. Samveg Lalbhai now heads the trust. Bhavarlal Nahta has written that the organization for restoring the Satrunjaya temples was originally founded by Acharya Devachandraji as mentioned in Devavilasa.

The name Sheth Anandji Kalyanji Pedhi would suggest that it is a business house belonging to Sheth Anandji, the son of Kalyanji. However, the names are imaginary and they refer to the role of the trust bringing Anand – pleasure and Kalyan- bliss to the Jain pilgrims.

The available documentation takes the history of the trust to samvat 1777 (1720 AD).

== Management ==
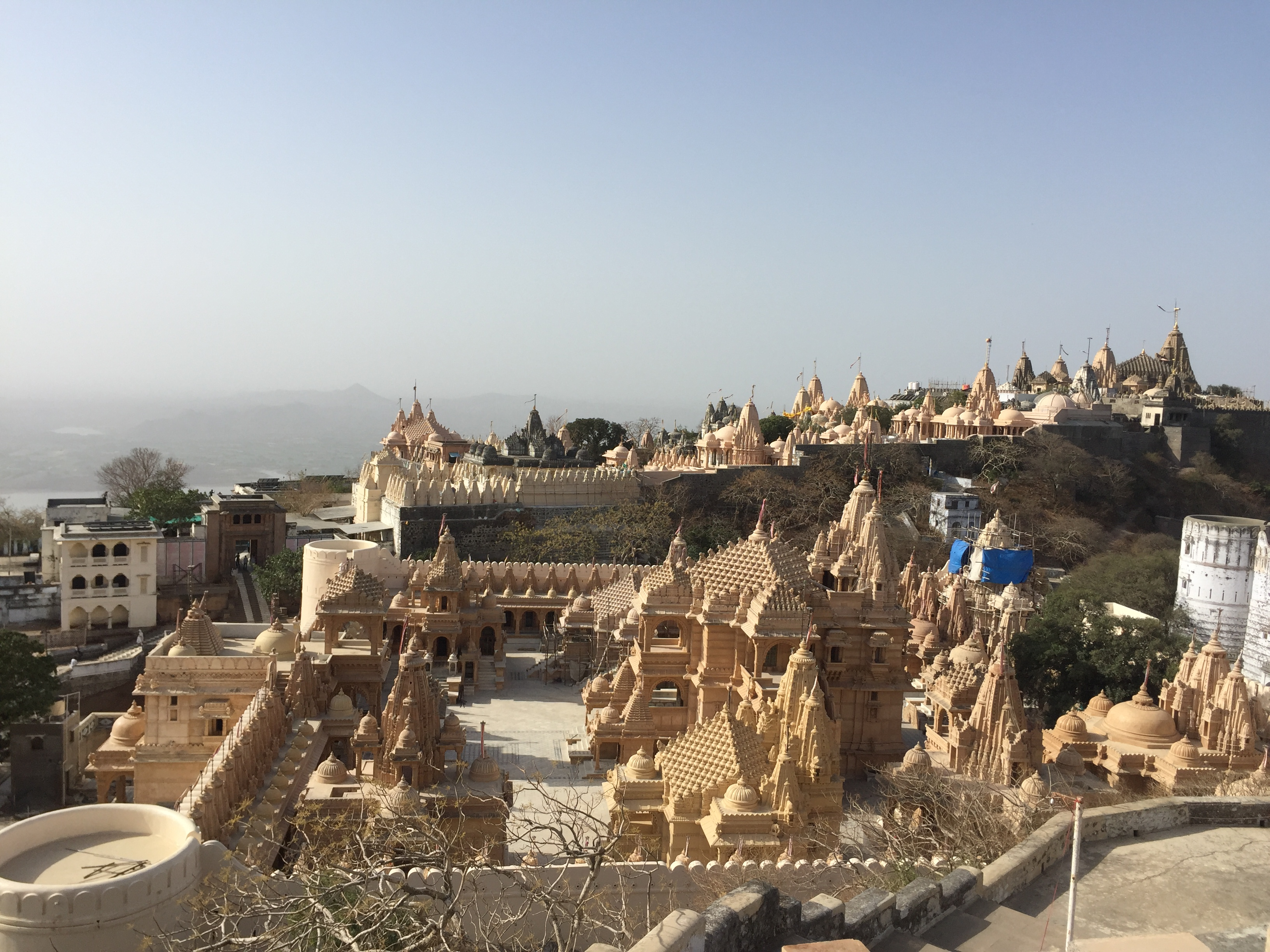
Shatrunjaya Temples

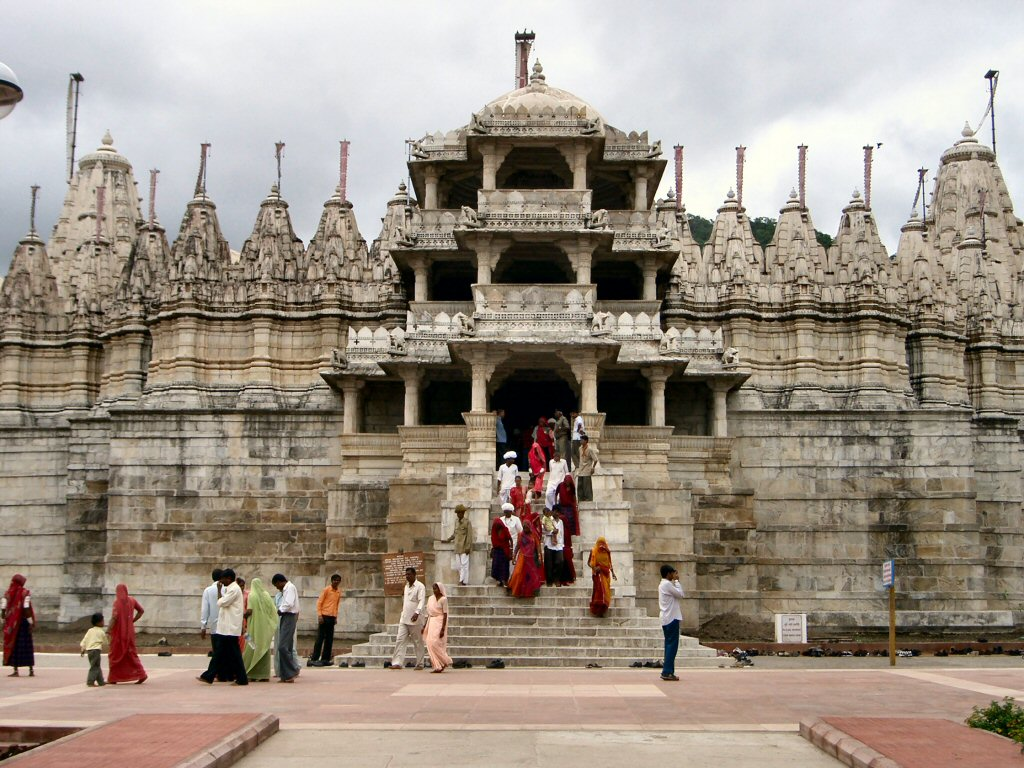
Ranakpur temple

The trust manages the following tirthas or temples.

- Banaras Kothi
- Chittorgarh Sattavis Dehra Temple
- Girnar
- Kumbhariya
- Maksi (shared with Digambaras)
- Muchhal Mahavir Temple
- Ranakpur renovated in 1933.
- Rikhabdeo (shared with Digambaras and Locals)
- Sammet Shikhar (shared with Digambaras under disputes, shwetambars does not recognise admin authority of Digambars)
- Shatrunjaya
- Sherisa
- Taranga (hill shared with Digambaras, the Ajitnath temple is in exclusive possession of shwetambars. Renovated in 1963.
- Vamaj

A sister organisation, Seth Kalyanji Parmanandji Pedhi of Sirohi manages temples at Mt. Abu at Delwada, Bamanvad and Mundalstha.

The trust also publishes books related to Śvetāmbara Jain Tirthas.

The trust spends more than Rs 150 million every year in repair works of various Jain temples. The trust members meet twice a year.
