= Kumbharia Jain temples =

Śvetāmbara Jain temple in Gujarat

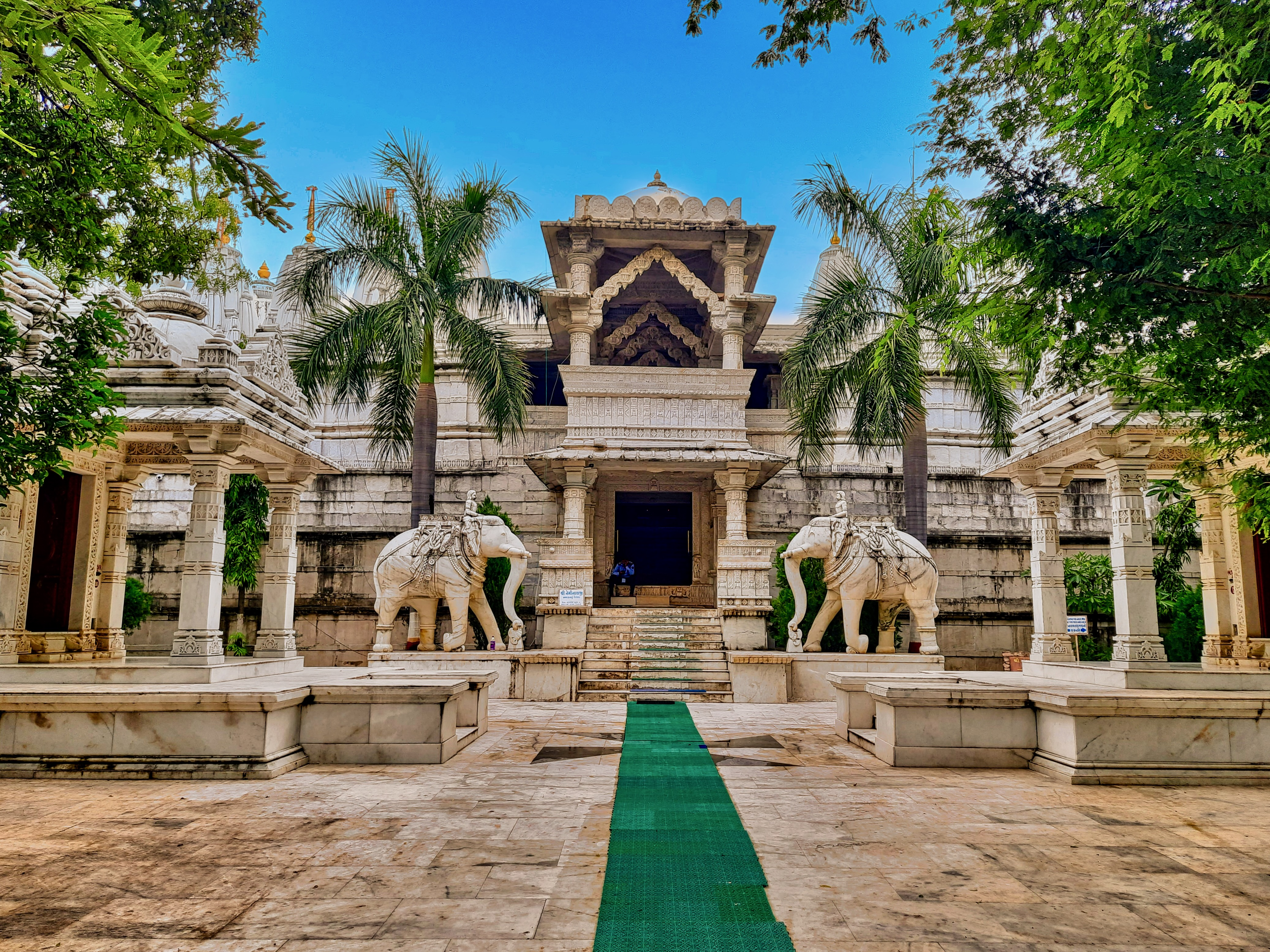
- Neminatha temple

Religion
- Affiliation: Jainism
- Sect: Śvētāmbara
- Deity: Mahavira, Parshvanath, Shantinatha, Neminatha & Sambhavanatha
- Festival: Mahavir Jayanti
- Governing body: Anandji Kalyanji Trust

Location
- Location: Kumbhariya, Gujarat
- Interactive map of Kumbharia Jain temples
- Coordinates: 24°19′27″N 72°51′46″E

Architecture
- Style: Māru-Gurjara architecture
- Creator: Bhima I, Karna, and Jayasimha Siddharaja
- Established: 1062–1231 CE
- Temple: 5

The Kumbharia Jain temples is a group of five Jain temples in the Kumbhariya, Banaskantha district in Gujarat, India. Constructed from 1062 to 1231 CE during the reign of the Chaulukya dynasty, they are noted for their elaborate architecture.

== History ==
Kumbharia was one of the most important Jain centres during the Chaulukya period. It is said that 360 temples existed in the region during the 4th century, but most were destroyed by volcanic activity and only five remain . These five Jain temples were constructed from 1062 to 1231 CE:

- Mahavira temple was built in 1062. This is the earliest Jain temple.
- Shantinath temple was built in 1082.
- Parshvanath temple was built in 1094 by the Chalukyan king Jayasimha Siddharaja.
- Neminath temple was built a little later in 1136 during the reign of Jayasimha Siddharaja.
- Sambhavanatha temple was built in 1231.

It is however unlikely that volcanism has directly destroyed any temples as there has not been any evidence of active volcanoes in India for over 500 thousand years (except on the Andaman Islands). Earthquake activity in India is however significant and may account for the destruction of such temples.

== Architecture ==
The Kumbharia Jain temples are famous for their elaborate architecture. Along with the Dilwara temples, Girnar Jain temples, and Taranga Jain temple, they are considered excellent examples of Chaulukyan architecture. The Mahavira, Shantinatha, and Parshvanatha temples in the Kumbharia Jain temple complex are some of the most renowned Jain temples in India. These five marble temples vary in size, image carvings, and architectural detail, with each having its own characteristics. Every temple is surrounded by a protective walled courtyard with elaborate porched gateways. (Note: Courtyard temple plan are specific to Jain temple architecture.)

=== Mahavira temple ===
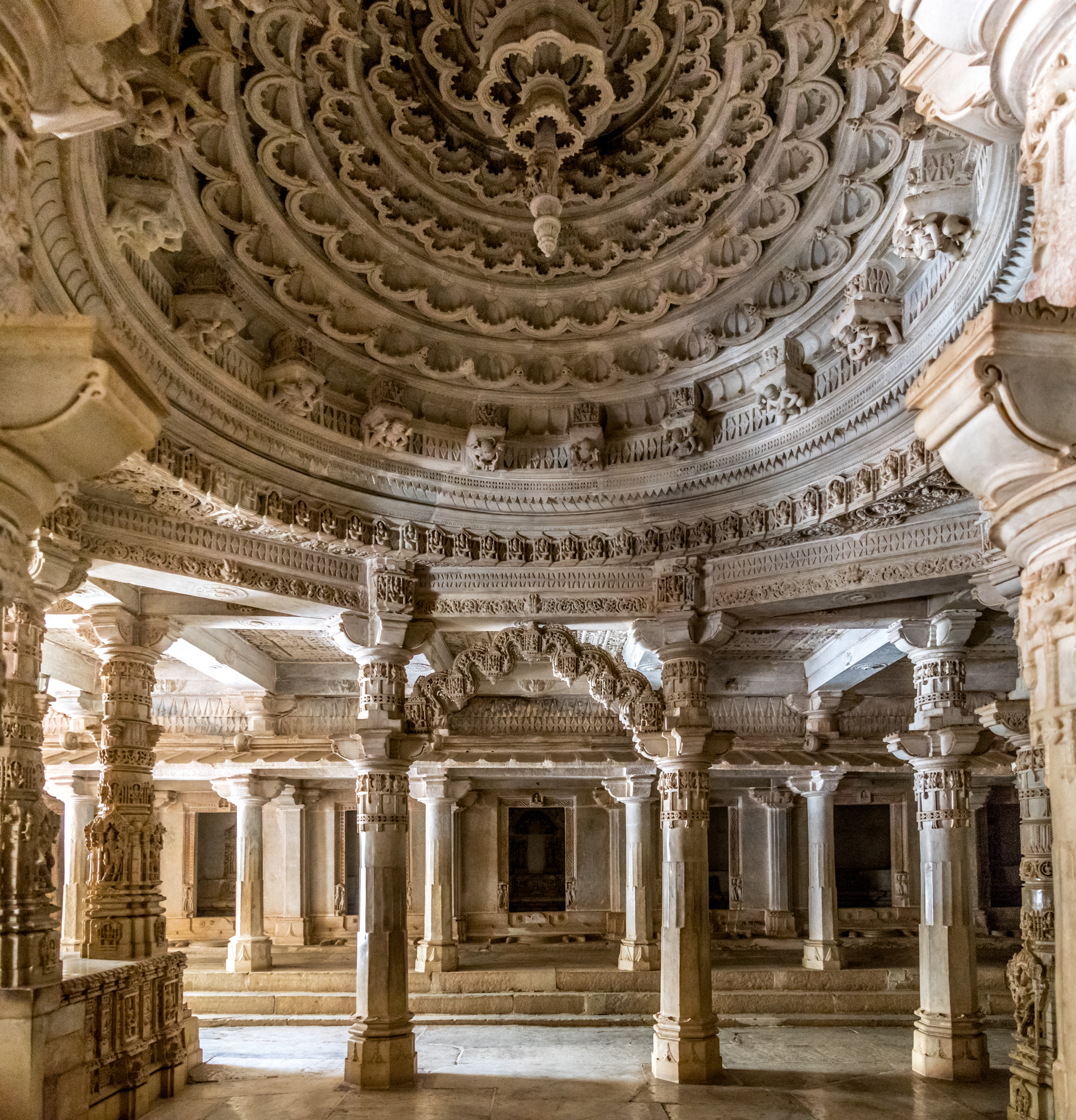
Interior of the Mahavira Temple

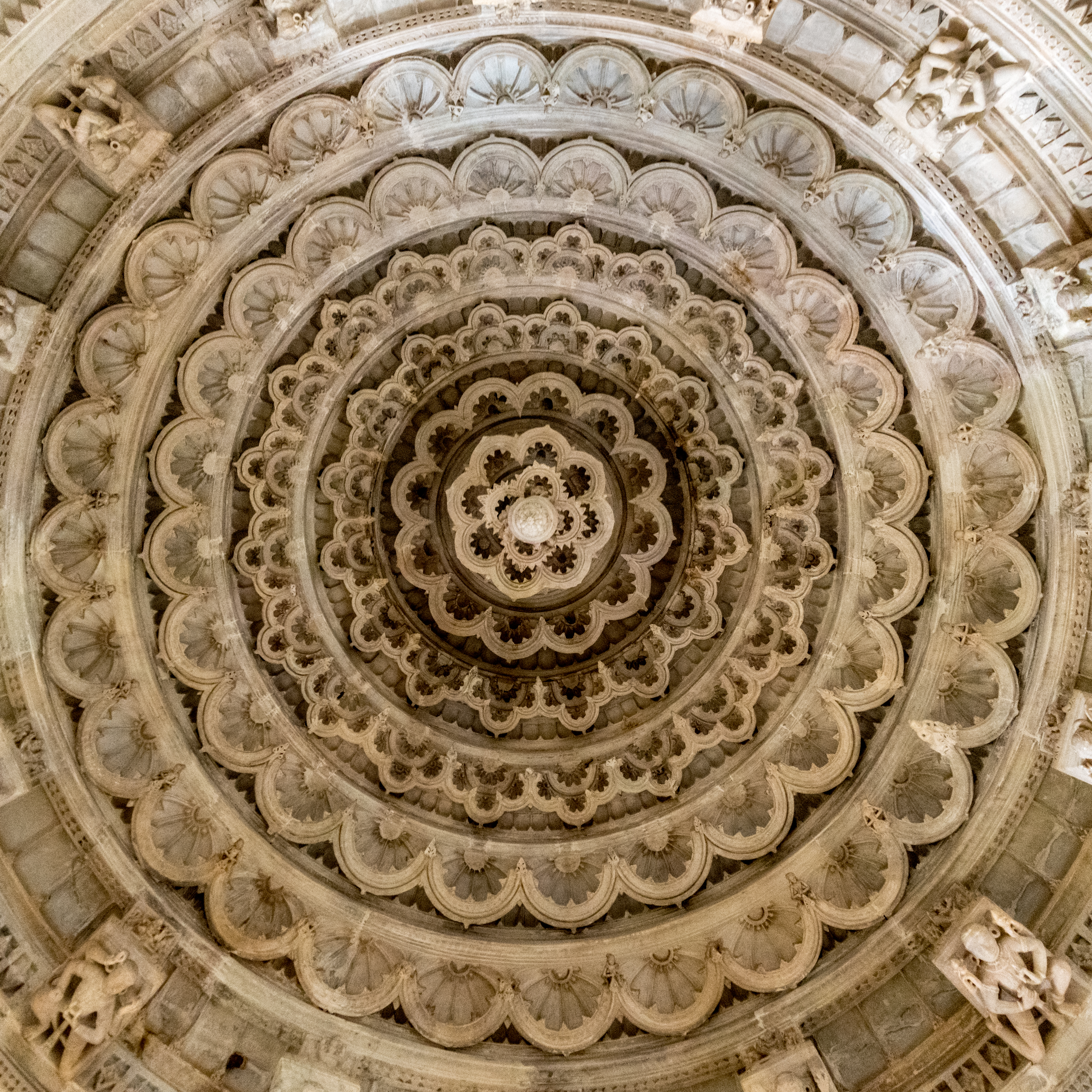
Rosette ceiling in Mahavira temple

Mahavira temple, also known as Arasana samghacaitya, is the temple of the Jain congregation at Arasana (Aras in Gujarati means marble). This temple's marble ceiling depicts scenes from Bahubali's life. The upper panel has a depiction of a war between Bahubali and Bharata chakravartin, showing both armies' horses, elephants, and soldiers. The lower panel depicts a duel between two brothers. The centre panel has an image of Bahubali in meditation being approached by Bharata and his wife. Another ceiling features carvings of the past and future tirthankara with their parents. There are depictions of the life events of Mahavira carved on the ceiling of the temple. The panels inside the temple also feature images of god, goddess, animals, trees etc carved in marble. One panel feature image of a Jain Goddess with a goat's head with a child depicting Garbh kalyāṇaka of Mahavira. The ceiling of the temple's porch houses a depiction of multi-tier Samavasarana.

=== Shantinatha temple ===
Shantinatha temple is similar to Mahavira temple. According to inscriptions, Shantinatha temple was originally dedicated to Rishabhanatha. The temple houses an important icon depicting Ashtapad and dating to 1210 CE. The Ashtapad idol is a diamond-shaped altar that depicts the mountain with images of 24 Tirthankars facing all four cardinal directions on two levels. The top of the icon depicts the Samavasarana of Rishabhanatha with a chaumukha image of Rishabhanatha.

=== Parshvanatha temple ===
The ceiling of Parshvanatha temple bears an image of Parshvanatha with a hood of snakes similar to those of Vimal Vasahi. The temple's stone idol of Ajitnatha stands on a pedestal bearing an elephant symbol. The temple features nine highly decked dev-kulikas. The torana-stambha features carvings of vidyadevi, aparaicakra, Purusudatta, Mahakali, Vajrasnrnkhala, Vajarankusa, and Rohini. The temple contains images of Sarvanha and Ambika as shasan-devata with the hood of a snake overhead.

=== Neminatha temple ===
The pillars of the Neminatha temple are ornately carved in a manner similar to those of Vimal Vasahi and feature a Nagara style Shikhara. This temple contains an image of the Hindu god Ganesha that is similar to that of Luna Vasahi and the Ranakpur Jain temple. The temple includes miniature carvings of vidya-devi like aparaicakra, Vajrasnrnkhala, Sarvastra-Mahajvala, Rohini, and Vairotya, which were popular iconographies in western India during the 11th and 12th centuries. According to an inscription, the munisuvrata-bimba was installed in 1281 CE (VS 1338).

=== Sambhavanatha temple ===
The Sambhavanatha temple is a small temple and a typical example of rich Chaulukyan architecture. According to an inscription in the Mahavira temple, the idol was gifted by "Pahini" in 1085 CE and the temple was originally dedicated to Shantinatha. The original idol of the temple was later mutilated and replaced with a new idol. The temple has a representation of the Hindu goddess Saraswati on its ceiling.

== Conservation ==
The temples, which have undergone repairs, renovations, and modifications, are managed by the Anandji Kalyanji Trust.

== See also ==
- Mahavira Jain temple, Osian
- Taranga Jain temple
- Ambaji
