= Ahmedabad Education Society =

Educational trust in Ahmedabad, Gujarat, India

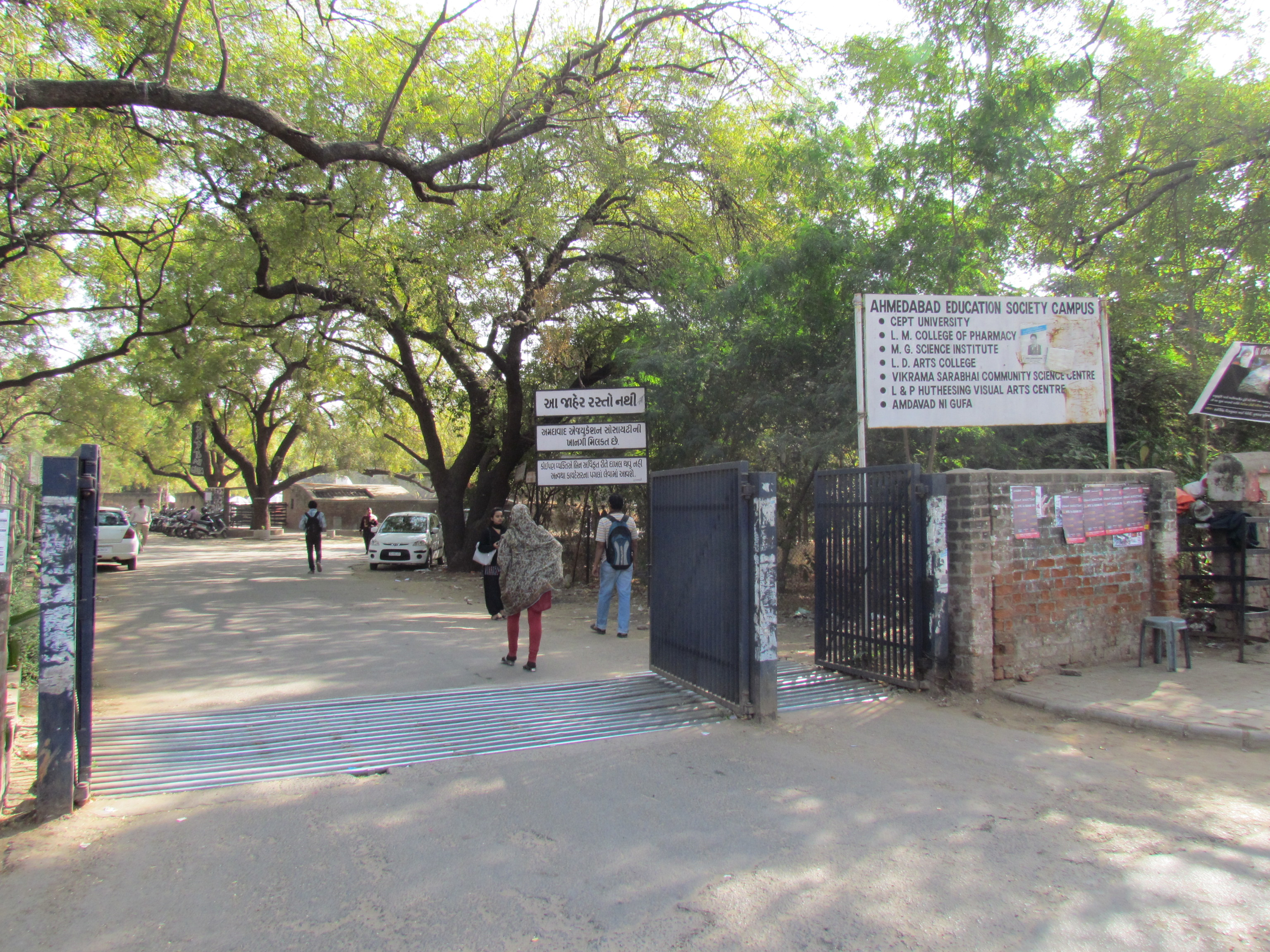
- Ahmedabad Education Society campus entrance
- Founded: 1935
- Founder: Kasturbhai Lalbhai (Founder)
- Headquarters: Gujarat, India
- Key people: Ganesh Mavlankar, Kasturbhai Lalbhai and Amritlal Hargovindas
- Website: aesahd.edu.in

Ahmadabad Education Society is a premier educational trust, which has founded many schools and colleges in Ahmedabad, Gujarat, India.

One of the largest academic trusts in Gujarat, consisting of 25 institutions providing education to more than 10,000 college and 3,000 school going children and hostel facilities to 1,000 male and 450 female students.

== History ==
Ahmedabad Education Society was established in 1935.

The society was established under the leadership of Ganesh Mavlankar, Kasturbhai Lalbhai and Amritlal Hargovindas, who pooled in their money, resources and influence. They were inspired with Sardar Vallabhbhai Patel, who felt there was an urgent need to develop Gujarat in the education front, as an extension of freedom struggle.

The society was later responsible for creation of Gujarat University in 1949, the idea for which was mooted as early as 1920 by Mahatma Gandhi, Sardar Patel, Kanhaiyalal Munshi, Ganesh Mavalankar, Kasturbhai Lalbhai, Anandshankar Dhruv, Amritlal Hargovinddas and others like Barrister, C C Gandhi.

In 1937 the society started its first college named Lalbhai Dalpatbhai Arts College followed by Hargovinddas Lakshmichand College of Commerce and later went on start colleges in every field like science, commerce, pharmacy, engineering, architecture, management, etc.

Later AES founded Ahmedabad University.

== Institutions run by trust ==
At present the following institutions are being run by trust:-

=== Schools ===
- A.G. High School
- K. H. Modi Kindergarten
- S. H. Kharwala & AGPS
- H. K. Primary Practicing School
- A.G.Primary School
- A.G. High School & G & D Parikh Higher Secondary School

=== Colleges ===
- AES Institute of Computer Sciences
- Amrut Mody School of Management (Earlier AES-PGIBM)
- B. K. Majumdar Institute of Business Administration
- H.L. Institute of Computer Application
- H.L. (Hargovandas Lakhmichand) College of Commerce
- H.L. Institute of Commerce
- L.D. (Lalbhai Dalpatbhai) Arts College
- L.M. (Lallubhai Motilal) College of Pharmacy
- M.G. (Mafatlal Gagalbhai) Science College
- A.G. (Acharatlal Girdharlal) Teachers College
- School of Engineering and Applied Science (SEAS)

=== Others ===
- H.L. Center for Professional Education
- L&P Hutheesing Visual Arts Center
- LTM, LL, SHK & KK Shah Jarodwalal Ladies Hostel
- Care taker of Caves of Ahmadabad.

=== Trustees of the Trust ===
There are three trustees:

- Shri Anangbhai A. Lalbhai
- Shri Prafullbhai Anubhai
- Shri Rajiv Chinubhai

== Admission policy ==
It follows reservation policy for SC/ST category wherever applicable while also providing a 10% lower cut off in programs. Only small percentages are reserved for NRI students. For professional courses (MBA/MCA/Engineering) the admission is based on the Common Admission Test conducted by the state/central authority.
