= Lalbhai Dalpatbhai =

Indian businessperson (1863–1912)

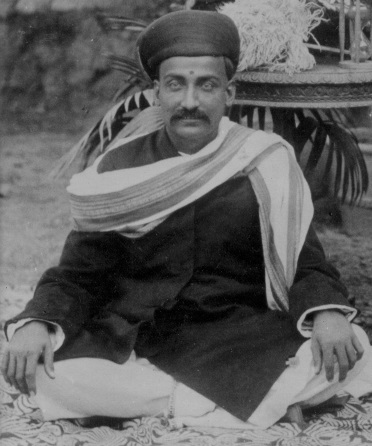
- Lalbhai Dalpatbhai

Lalbhai Dalpatbhai (1863-1912) was an industrialist and one of the first generation textile mill owners from Ahmedabad, who laid the foundation of the present-day Lalbhai group of Industries.

== Life ==
Lalbhai was born in 1863 at Ahmedabad to Dalpatbhai Bhagubhai in a Gujarati Oswal Jain family of nagarsheths and jewellers and was a direct descendant of the 16th-century merchant, Shantidas Jhaveri. He was the great-grandson of Vakhatchand's second son, Motibhai.

After growing up, he carried on the traditional business of precious gems of his family. His father Dalpatbhai Bhagubhai was also in cotton trading business since the 1870 As an expansion of his cotton trading business, he decided to start his own cotton mill and in 1896 he floated the Saraspur Mills followed by Raipur Mills in 1897. These two mills laid the foundation of present-day Lalbhai group. The group was later expanded by his sons and noted nationalist and philanthropist, Kasturbhai Lalbhai, Narottambhai Lalbhai, Chimanbhai Lalbhai and grandsons like Shrenik Kasturbhai Lalbhai, Arvind Narottambhai Lalbhai and Chinubhai Chimanbhai. The group now consists of mills like Arvind Mills, Atul Limited among others.

For most of his life Lalbhai lived in his ancestral home in Jhaveriwad in the walled city of Ahmedabad. Forty family members shared an eight-room home along with a dozen servants. Between 1910 and 1912 he moved into a newly constructed colonial style mansion in Shahibaug. He was a strict father and the family had a simple and traditional style of living.

He died in 1912 at the age of 49 due to a heart attack. Perimal notes that Lalbhai had been stressed due to a recent acrimonious family dispute involving division of family property and businesses.

== Memorials ==
- Lalbhai Dalpatbhai College of Engineering
- Lalbhai Dalpatbhai Museum
- Lalbhai Dalpatbhai Arts College
- Lalbhai Dalpatbhai Institute of Indology
