= Shantidas Jhaveri =

Indian jeweller, bullion trader, and moneylender (1584–1659)

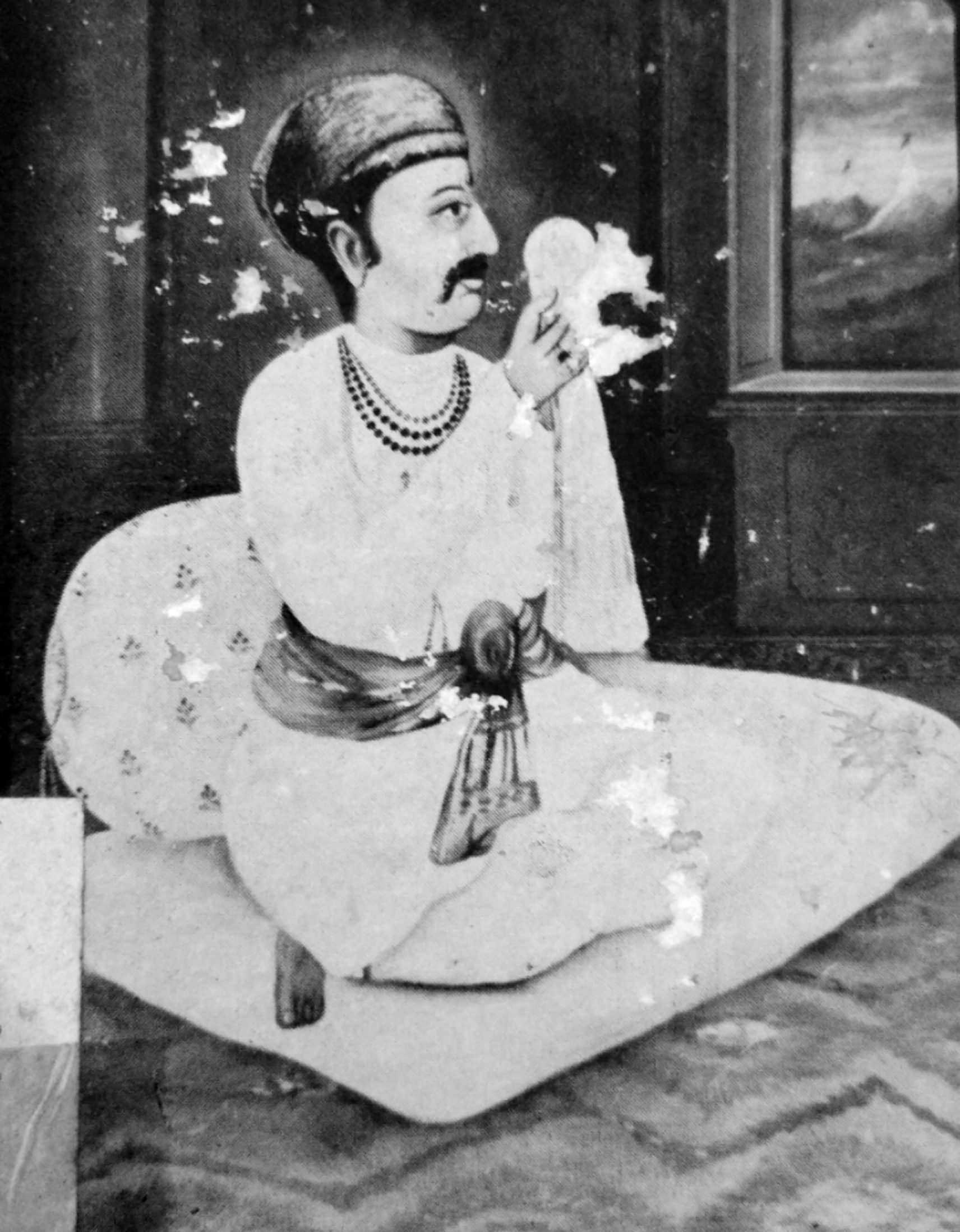
- Painting of Shantidas in hall of Shri Vardhman Tap Ayambil Sanstha in Vaghanpol, Zaveriwad, Ahmedabad
- Born: 1584; Jhaveriwada, Ahmedabad, Gujarat Subah, Mughal Empire (present-day Gujarat, India)
- Died: 1659 (aged 74–75); Ahmedabad
- Other names: Shantidas Zaveri, Shantidas Jawahari, Shanti Das, Santidas
- Citizenship: Mughal Empire
- Occupations: Trader and moneylender
- Title: Nagarsheth (city chief)

Shantidas Jhaveri (ISO 15919: Śāntidāsa Jhaverī; 1584–1659) was an Indian Jain jeweller, bullion trader (sarraf) and moneylender (sahukar) during the Mughal era. He was the wealthiest merchant in the Ahmedabad city during the 17th century.

== Early life ==
Shantidas was born in 1584 in Jhaveriwada, Ahmedabad. His family was of Oswal Jain Vania origin from the Marwar region. His parents Sahasra Kiran and Saubhagya Devi had migrated from Osian to Ahmedabad in the late 16th century. Shantidas expanded his father's jewellery retail business by setting up a sarrafa (bullion trading) business.

== Business activities ==
Shantidas retailed jewellery to the rich, including the Mughal royalty and nobility. Farmans from Emperor Jahangir and Dara Shikoh indicate that he was asked to offer jewellery to the Mughal royalty. In 1639, Asaf Khan the brother of Nur Jahan and the father of Mumtaz Mahal purchased a large quantity of jewels from Shantidas. After he died, the Emperor Shah Jahan forced Shantidas to take back the jewels and refund the money.

Shantidas also traded with the European companies (British East India Company and Dutch VOC), as well as Persian and Arab traders, in commodities such as cloves. In September 1635, Shantidas and some other merchants from Surat and Ahmedabad, lost their goods to English pirates. He used his influence and political connections to recover his loss from the English.

He however became most influential as a moneylender: most of the capital lent to the Dutch East India Company (VOC) in India came from Shantidas and his close associate Virji Vora. These associations provided him with excellent profits and strong and constant flow of gold-denominated interest payments, making him a wealthy man.

== Relations with the Mughal authorities ==
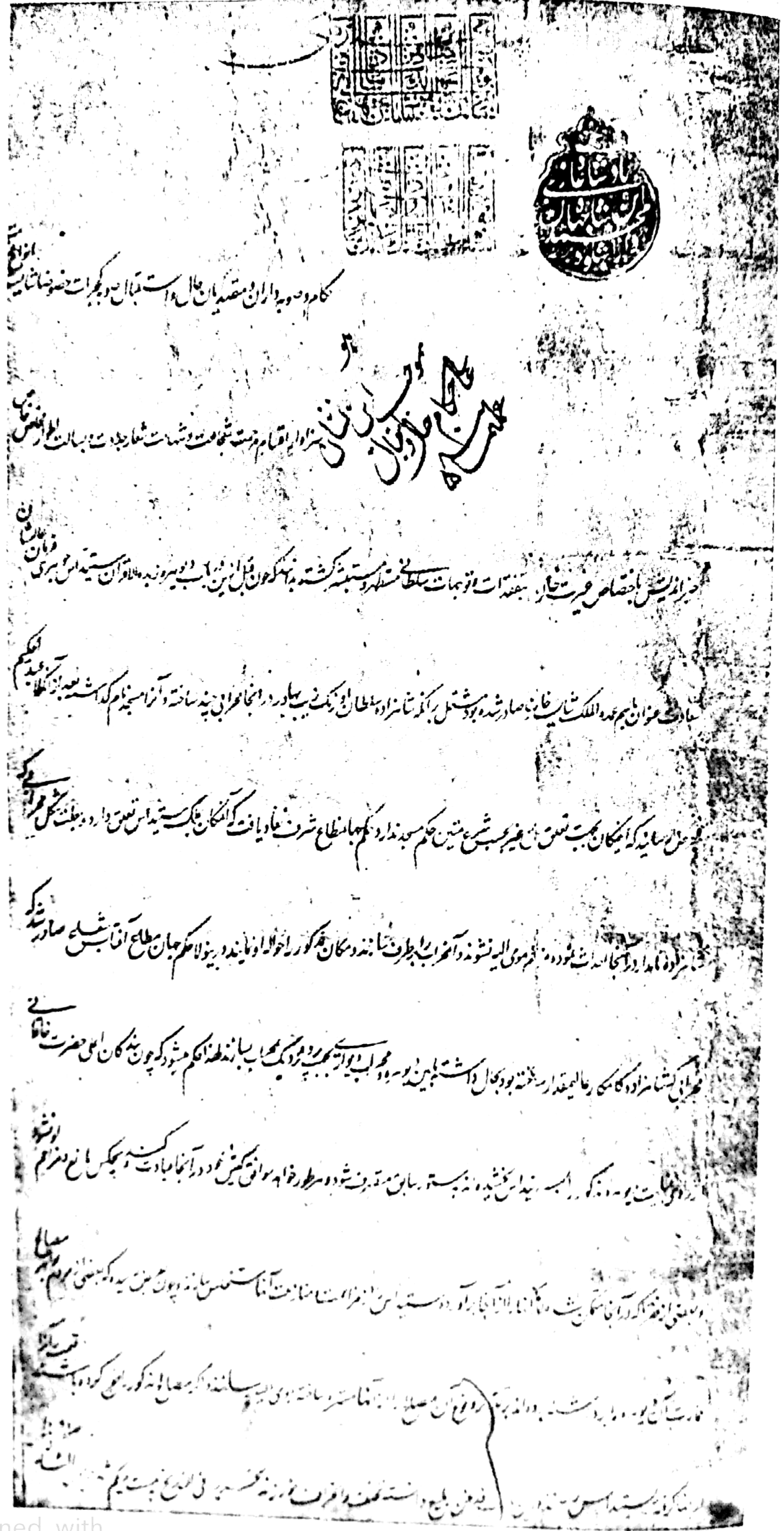
Royal Firman from Shah Jahan to Shantidas Jhaveri regarding Chintamani Parshwanath Jain Temple, dated 3 July 1648

As a court jeweller, Shantidas had access to the Mughal household. Modern Jain tradition asserts that Shantidas was addressed as mama (maternal uncle) by the Emperor Shah Jahan. Farmans issued by the Mughal emperors Jehangir, Shah Jahan and Aurangzeb suggest that the Mughal royalty maintained good relations with him. Jehangir is said to have conferred the title of "Nagarsheth" upon him. Farmans were issued during Shah Jahan's reign which prohibited the administrators of the Subah of Ahmedabad from illegally encroaching on his properties, interfering in the rent collection of his businesses, or troubling his family. Port authorities were also directed to give safe conduct to Shantidas' agents and assist them in the procurement of "jewels and other articles". Shantidas was also entrusted with the responsibility of procuring jewels for the celebration of the anniversary of the royal accession of the emperor.

In 1644, Shantidas bought the royal haveli of Haji Ikhlas for approximately Rupees 6,000. In a Farman dated 5 March 1647, 38 bighas of land and a well in Asarwa, which belonged to Shantidas' sons, were now given to Shantidas as a gift after their death. In 1657, the lease-grant of Shankeshwar was renewed for the sum of Rupees 1,050. He was also directed to work for the welfare of its inhabitants, and consider the matter "very urgent". In addition to this, he was also given possession of Shatrunjaya, Girnar, and Abu (then under the Raja of Sirohi, Maharao Akheraj II) hills by Aurangzeb. However, the firman for this grant was issued on 12 March 1660, a year after Shantidas' death.

In 1645, the Mughal prince Aurangzeb desecrated the Chintamani Parshvanath temple constructed by Shantidas, after being appointed the Governor of Gujarat. According to the French traveller Jean de Thévenot (1666), Aurangzeb caused a cow to be killed in the temple premises, destroyed the noses of all idols in the temple, and then converted the place into a mosque called Quvvat-ul-Islam ("the Might of Islam"). Shantidas complained to Aurangzeb's father Emperor Shah Jahan. In 1648, the Emperor issued a firman declaring that the building should be handed over to Shantidas, and a wall should be raised between the mihrabs (niches in the mosque walls) and the rest of the original temple building. It also declared that the Muslim fakirs housed in the mosque premises should be removed, and the materials carried away from the temple should be restored.

After becoming the emperor, Aurangzeb acknowledged the influence of Shantidas in the merchant community. In 1657, Shah Jahan's son Murad Baksh had compelled Shantidas to lend him Rupees 550,000. After Shah Jahan's death, Aurangzeb imprisoned Murad. Shantidas managed to secure from the new emperor, a firman ordering the imperial dewan Rahmat Khan to pay him Rupees 100,000 from the royal treasury as part of the loan recovery. Aurangzeb also sent a firman asking him to convey the emperor's goodwill to the merchants and other inhabitants of Ahmedabad.

== Religious and political activities ==
Shantidas was a devout Jain who gave generously to the Gujarati Jain community. He spent a substantial amount of money on conducting the sanghas and protecting Jain temples. He helped the monks in setting up pathshalas (schools). A contemporary Sanskrit language document states that he took great interest in maintaining manuscripts, and encouraged the monks to develop literature.

In 1622, Shantidas started the construction of the Chintamani Parshvanath temple at Saraspur, Ahmedabad. The construction was completed in 1638, and cost Rs. 900,000 (900,000). The temple has been described in the writings of the foreign travellers such as the German adventurer Johan Albrecht de Mandelslo. His philanthropy does not appear to have extended beyond his own Jain community.

Shantidas also participated in the contemporary religious politics. At that time, there were several Jain factions (gacchas) within the Śvetāmbara Jain sect, and Shantidas belonged to the Sagar gaccha. Muktisagar, a monk of the Sagar gaccha was a close friend of Shantidas, and in 1625, he had installed an idol in the Chintamani Parshawanath temple constructed by him. Shantidas wanted to see Muktisagar become an acharya (the highest leader of a Jain order), but the request was declined by Vijayadeva Suri, a senior acharya belonging to the Tapa gaccha. Shantidas sought the help of Shrimalla, a merchant from Cambay, who had played an important role in Vijayadeva's promotion to the acharya post in 1601. With his influence, Muktisagar was appointed as an acharya in 1630, under the name "Rajsagar". Later, Shantidas planned a shastrartha (religious debate) between Vijayadeva Suri and Muktisagar (Rajsagar Suri) in Jalore. His intention was to raise the prestige of his faction (and perhaps, to increase his own influence), but Muktisagar lost courage and backed out of the debate before it began.

Shantidas also led a boycott against the Lonka gaccha, which criticised idol worship (something that Shantidas's own gachha accepted). In September 1644, he exerted his influence to enforcing a ban against the Lonkas, with respect to inter-marrying and inter-dining. The Lonkas of Ahmedabad complained to the emperor Shah Jahan, but the emperor refused to intervene in the matter.

As the Subahdar (Governor) of Gujarat, Shah Jahan's son Murad Baksh granted the village of Palitana to Shantidas Jhaveri in 1656. Palitana later emerged as a major pilgrimage centre for the Jains.

== Legacy ==
Khushalchand (1680–1748), the grandson of Shantidas, was also a prominent merchant, and paid ransom to the Marathas to save Ahmedabad from plunder. Khushalchand's son Vakhatchand (1740–1814) was also a noted businessman. The Lalbhai family of modern India, which owns the Arvind Mills, traces its ancestry to Shantidas through Lalbhai Dalpatbhai, the great-great-great-grandson of Khushalchand.

== See also ==
- Anandji Kalyanji Trust
