= Arvind Narottambhai Lalbhai =

Arvind Narottambhai Lalbhai (3 April 1918 – 2007) was son of Narrotam Lalbhai one of the three brothers who founded the Arvind Mills in 1931, which today is amongst the top textiles companies of India and is the flagship company of the Rs. 2,000 crore Lalbhai Group established by his grandfather Lalbhai Dalpatbhai in 1896.

He was also the president of the Ahmedabad Mill Owners Association, the Gujarat Chamber of Commerce and Industries and the Gujarat Small Scale Industries Federation. Mr. Lalbhai served the textile industry in several capacities, including as chairman of the textile committee in 1980 and the Indian Cotton Mills Federation in 1982. He also worked on various committees and panels of state and Central government and was a member of the Customs and Central Excise Advisory Council of India.

One of India's visionary industrialists, Arvind Narottam Lalbhai died at the age of 89.
