= Vamaj =

- village
- Location in Gujarat, India Vamaj (India)
- Coordinates: 23.22°N 72.41°E
- Country: India
- State: Gujarat
- District: Mehsana

Government
  - Body: Vamaj Gram Panchayat

Languages
  - Official: Gujarati, Hindi
- Time zone: UTC+5:30 (IST)
- PIN: 382715
- Vehicle registration: GJ
- Nearest city: Kalol, Kadi and Ahmedabad
- Lok Sabha constituency: Mehsana
- Vidhan Sabha constituency: Kadi
- Civic agency: Vamaj Gram Panchayat
- Website: gujaratindia.com

Vamaj is a small village situated near Kadi (a town known for its oil industry) and Kalol. Its Panchayat code is 162352.

== History ==
It is also famous for Shri Vamaj Tirth, a temple belonging to the Jain religion. The idol of Dada Adishvar in the temple belongs to the times of king Samprati
