= Khushalchand =

Gujarati politician and jeweler (1680–1748)

Khushalchand Lakshmichand Jhaveri (1680–1748) was an Indian jeweler and financier in late Mughal Gujarat and the nagarsheth (chief merchant) of Ahmedabad. He played a key role in power struggles in Ahmedabad for the control of Gujarat in the early 18th century, and financially supported various factions over his lifetime.

== Life ==
Khushalchand (b. 1680), was the son of Shantidas Jhaveri's third son Lakshmichand, and was the first documented member of his family to be the nagarsheth (chief merchant) of Ahmedabad, and the title thereafter remained with his descendants.

Kushalchand's family were Oswal Jain Vaniyas.

=== Alliance with Hamid Khan ===
In the power struggle between the rebel Hamid Khan (former deputy governor of Gujarat for his uncle, Nizam-ul-Mulk, Asaf Jah I, former (absentee) governor of Gujarat) and the Mughal imperialist Shuja‘at Khan (appointed deputy governor of Gujarat for Mubariz-ul-Mulk, Sarbuland Khan Bahadur, appointed (absentee) governor of Gujarat), Khushalchand sided with the rebel Hamid Khan. In 1724, Khushalchand secretly opened the gates of Ahmedabad in the middle of the night to let Hamid Khan and his Maratha allies into the city, leading to the death of the Ibrahim Quli Khan, brother of the already-slain Shuja‘at Khan. For his actions, Khushalchand was labelled a traitor by Shamal Bhatt in his poem Rustam no Saloko, from which it is learned the local population generally preferred the stability of the Mughal imperialist forces to the chaos of Hamid Khan and the Marathas.

After defeating and slaying Shuja‘at Khan's brother Rustam Ali Khan in battle, Hamid Khan returned to Ahmedabad in 1725 with his Maratha allies Kanthaji and Pilaji. Thereupon Hamid Khan agreed to give the chauth of the parganas' north of the Mahi River to Kanthaji and south of the Mahi to Pilaji. However, Khushalchand was able to save the city from the Maratha looters by paying them off with his own money. For his gracious act, the mahajans or merchant guilds of the city (including Hindus, Muslims, and Europeans) promised to give Khushalchand and his descendants in perpetuity four annas on every hundred rupees worth of goods entering or leaving the city that were stamped in the municipal weighing yard.

In April 1725, news reached Sarbuland Khan (the (absentee) governor of Gujarat) in Delhi that his deputy (Shuja‘at Khan) and deputy's brothers had been defeated and killed by the rebel Hamid Khan, and so resolved to govern the province in person. In response Hamid Khan began war preparations against the more experienced Mughal commander. On 3 June 1725, Khushalchand raised 500,000 rupees from local bankers insured by his own gold reserves, and gave the amount ot Hamid Khan, hoping to eventually be repaid and given special privileges. By 25 June, Hamid Khan summoned Khushalchand to the Bhadra fort and asked him to raise an additional 10,00,000 rupees, either from the people of Ahmedabad or his own pocket. Khushalchand's agents went around the city trying to raise at least 1,00,000, however many people refused once they learned Hamid Khan was the one requesting the amount. By 9 July, 5,00,000 rupees had been raised but not without many citizens fleeing the city. By August, Hamid Khan's soldiers took their sizeable pay wages directly from Khushalchand.

=== Alliance and Fallout with Sarbuland Khan ===
In December 1725, Sarbuland Khan reached Ahmedabad and Hamid Khan fled. Khushalchand met with the governor and switched allegiances to his side. In January 1726, Sarbuland Khan summoned Khushalchand and ordered him to place a 9% tax on every house in the city, and raise an amount of 5,00,000 rupees from the city bankers within 25 days. To raise the amount, Khushalchand began mortgaging ijāras (temperorary revenue rights) to mansabdārs (rank-holding officials) who could make advance payments. At another point, Khushalchand gave Asaf Khan 3,00,000 rupees for his towns security and soldiers' drinks, which angered Sarbuland Khan.

Eventually in September 1726, news reached the emperor Muhammad Shah in Delhi that Khushalchand and his rival/cousin, the silk merchant Ganga Das, were raising money from the local people. Muhammad Shah ordered Sarbuland Khan to send the two merchants to Delhi, but instead Sarbuland Khan got another loan of 1,00,000 rupees from Khushalchand. In only eighteen months, Sarbuland Khan had become bankrupt due to financial mismanagement, and could not even afford to pay his soldiers good wages in comparison to Hamid Khan a year before. On 16 September, Sarbuland Khan asked Khushalchand for another loan, but Khushalchand replied that the governor should ask other bankers in the city. Sarbuland Khan became irritated upon hearing this, and angrily told him that Khushalchand could have jewelry from the treasury and his son as collateral and a 25% interest rate on the loan, to which Khushalchand agreed. On 28 September, Khushalchand was summoned to the Bhadra regarding an earlier loan of 60,000 rupees Sarbuland Khan had requested of him. Khushalchand had gone to other bankers in the city asking to be lent the money, but the bankers refused and complained to Sarbuland Khan. Sarbuland Khan was angry that Khushalchand had asked others for the amount Sarbuland Khan requested, thereby letting people know of Sarbuland's insolvency. Sarbuland Khan slapped Khushalchand a couple times, had him jailed, and ordered him to pay a fine of several hundred thousand rupees to be let go. He also stripped Khushalchand of his title of nagarsheth, and gave it to his rival cousin Ganga Das. During his week in jail, Khushalchand was whipped and ordered to bring out all of his wealth. In October, Khushalchand was personally beaten in jail by Sarbuland, and had 2,00,000 rupees forcibly taken from him. By late October, Khushalchand's lawyers wrote to the imperial Mughal court in Shahjahanabad that Sarbuland Khan was tyrannically torturing Khushalchand, but Khushalchand's enemies also wrote to Delhi that it was by Khushalchand's previous support of Hamid Khan that had ruined the province. The emperor Muhammad Shah ordered Sarbuland Khan to investigate the matter, but Sarbuland Khan made a report signed by Qazi, Muslim religious elites, merchants, bankers, and public that accused Khushalchand of treachery sentenced him to life in prison. Khushalchand's enemies offered a 1,00,000 loan to Sarbuland Khan if he publicly humiliated Khushalchand. Eventually on the advice of Ali Muhammad Khan, Khushalchand was released on a fine of 60,000 rupees, and Khushalchand escaped to Delhi.

=== Return to Ahmedabad under Abhai Singh ===
Eventually Sarbuland Khan was removed from his position as governor and replaced with Maharaja Abhai Singh of Marwar, who appointed Ahmad Bohra as nagarsheth. In 1732, Khushalchand returned from Delhi with a firman of Samsam-ud-daulah, the Amir al-umara of the empire, that he was to be reinstated as nagarsheth. Abhai Singh, not wanting to lose face by dismissing his own appointee to the position, made Ahmad Bohra nagarsheth of the Muslims and Khushalchand Jhaveri that of the Hindus. However, Ahmad Bohra and Abhai Singh's deputy and treasurer, Ratan Singh, were levying illegal fines and extractions upon the people of the city which Khushalchand opposed. For two years Khushalchand and Ahmad butted heads, with Ahmad complaining to Ratan Singh and Khushalchand allying with Momin Khan and Jawan Mard Khan. Eventually Ratan Singh called a meeting where Ahmad Bohra charged Khushalchand with crimes, and Ratan Singh had him exiled from the city.

=== Imprisonment by Rangoji ===
Eventually Khushalchand returned to city around the time Abhai Singh was removed from the position of governor and replaced by Momin Khan. Upon Momin Khan's death, Ahmedabad came under the control of his cousin Fida-ud-din Khan, his son Muftakhir Khan, and the Maratha Rangoji. The three then arrested Khushalchand and forced him to pay a 100 rupees in fines a day in order to pay government officials. In 1743, Khushalchand escaped imprisonment during the chaos of a city battle between Fida-ud-din Khan and Muftakhir Khan against Rangoji.

=== Death ===
In 1748, Khushalchand died of natural causes, and was succeeded by his eldest son Nathushah as nagarsheth, and later by Vakhatchand (third son of Khushalchand).

== See also ==
- Shantidas Jhaveri

== Sources ==
- Commissariat, M.S. (1957). A History of Gujarat. Vol. II The Mughal Period: From 1573 to 1758. Orient Longmans.
- Tripathi, Dwijendra; Mehta, M. J. (1978). "The Nagarsheth of Ahmedabad: The History of an Urban Institution in a Gujarat City". Proceedings of the Indian History Congress. 39. Hyderabad: 481–96. JSTOR 44139386.
- Sheth, Sudev (2024). Bankrolling Empire: Family Fortunes and Political Transformation in Mughal India. Cambridge University Press.
