= Taranga Jain temple =

Jain temple dedicated to Lord Ajitnatha on Taranga hill, Gujarat

Taranga Jain Tirtha
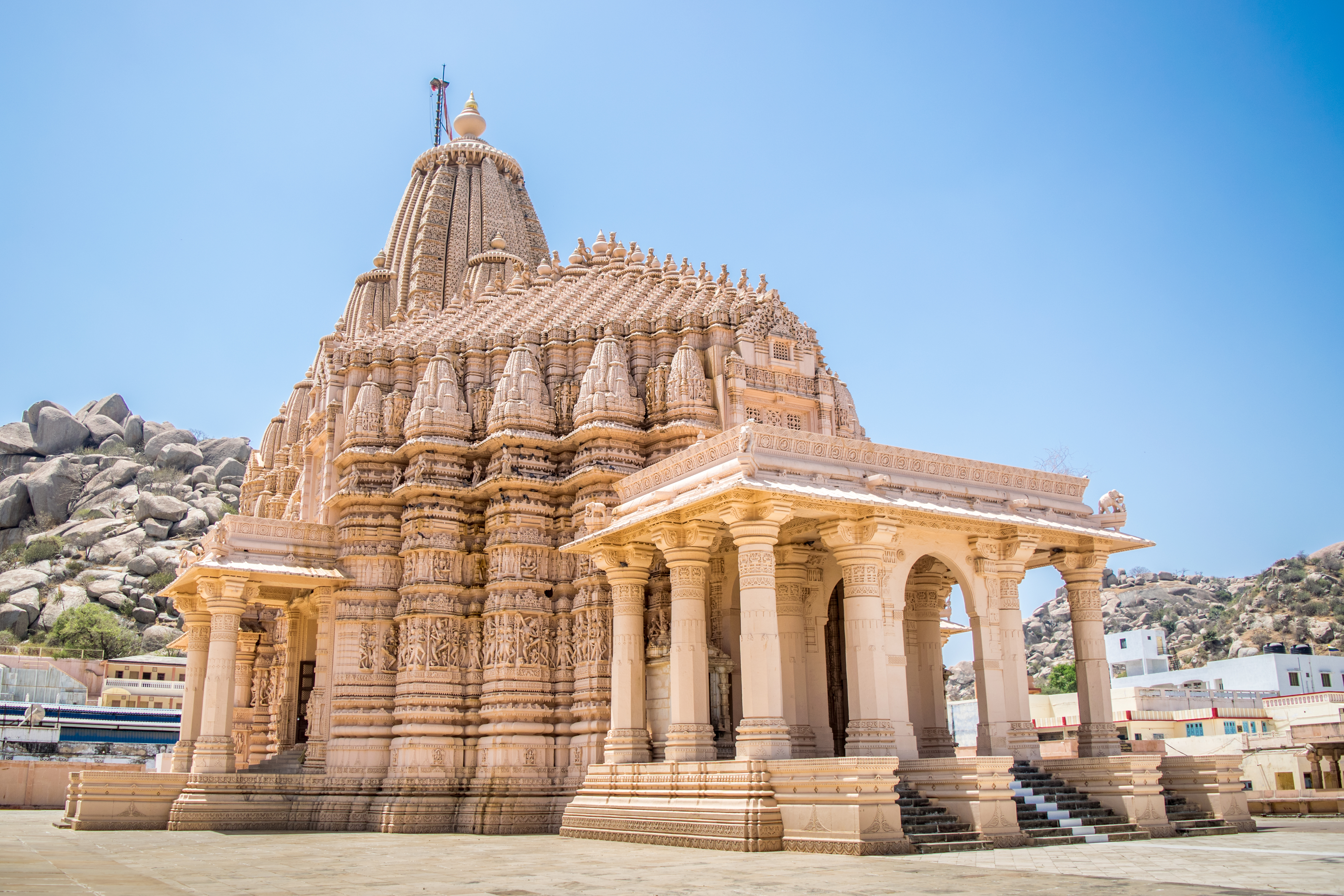
- Shwetambar Ajitanatha temple

- Location within Gujarat

Religion
- Affiliation: Jainism
- Deity: Ajitnath
- Festival: Mahavir Janma Kalyanak
- Governing body: Anandji Kalyanji Trust

Location
- Location: Near Kheralu, Mehsana, Gujarat, India
- Coordinates: 23°57′59″N 72°45′17″E

Architecture
- Creator: Kumarapala
- Established: 1121

Specifications
- Temples: 14 Śvetāmbara and 5 Digambara
- Elevation: 45 m (148 ft) (Approximate)

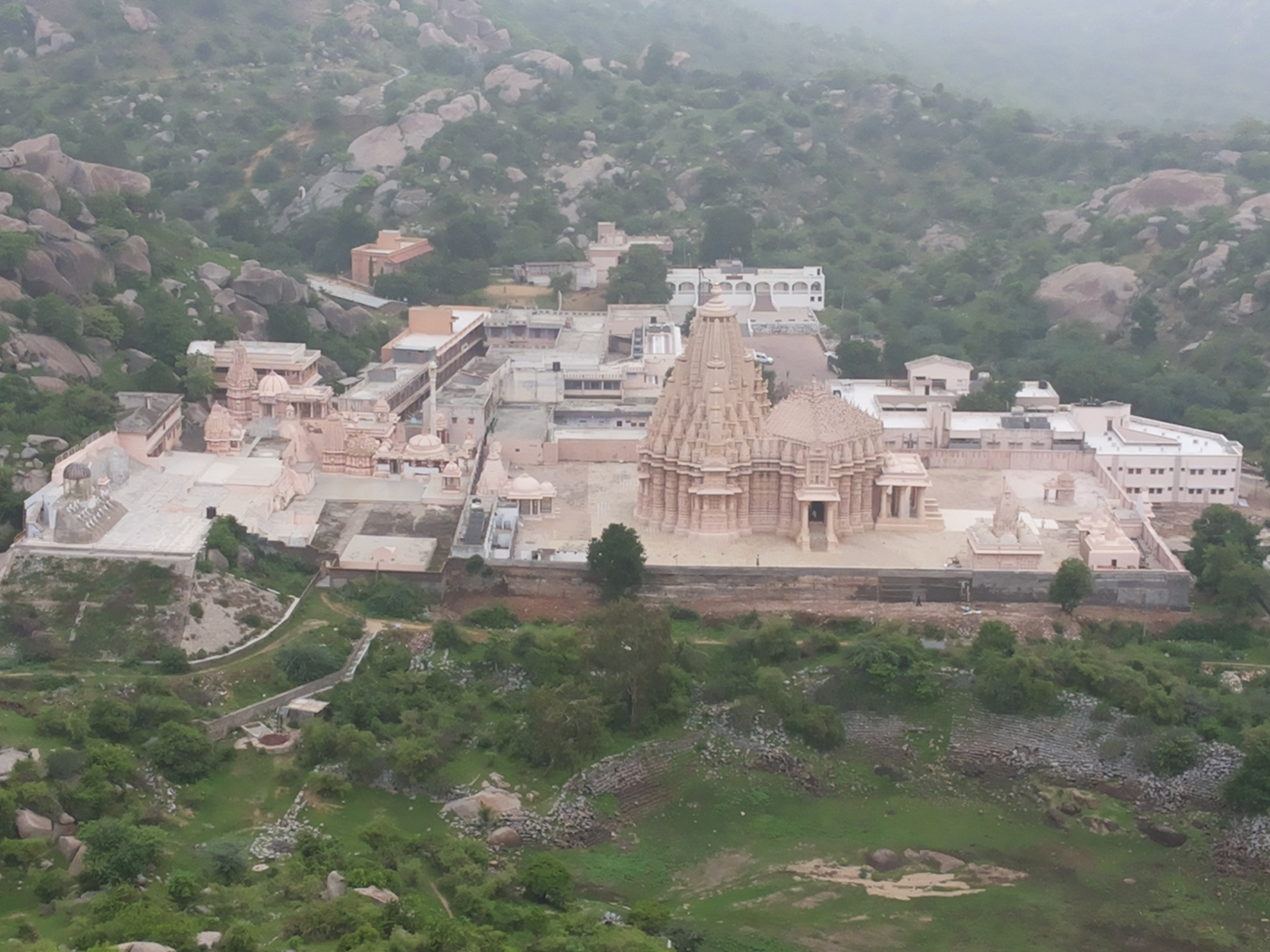
Śvetāmbara compound is visible on the right while Digambara compound is on left.

Taranga is a Jain pilgrimage center near Kheralu in Mehsana district, Gujarat, India, with two compounds of Jain temples that are important examples of the Māru-Gurjara style of architecture. The Ajitnatha temple, was constructed in 1161 by the Solanki king Kumarapala, under the advice of his teacher, Acharya Hemachandra. Both the main sects of Jainism are represented, with adjoining walled compounds: the Śvetāmbara compound consists of fourteen temples in all, and there are also five Digambara-affiliated temples at Taranga hill.

== History and monuments ==
Taranga became an important Jain pilgrimage site in the 12th century. Kumarapal Pratibodha of Somaprabhacharya, composed in Vikram Samvat 1241, states the local Buddhist king Veni Vatsaraja and a 2nd century CE Jain monk Khaputacharya had built a temple for goddess Tara and thus the town was named Tarapur.

The hill is for the most part covered with brushwood and forest is, on the east and west, crossed by a road that lead to a plateau where stand the temples built of white sandstone and brick. The major Ajitanatha temple was built by Chaulukya king Kumarapala (1143–1174) after he became a follower of Jainism under his teacher Acharya Hemchandra.

=== Ajitanatha Jain temple ===
In the centre of the main square of the length of 230 ft (70 m) and the breadth 230 ft (70 m), this temple is 50-foot (15 m) long, 100-foot (30 m) broad and 142-foot (43 m) high. It has a perimeter of 639 ft (195 m). The 902 ft (275 m) high wooden summit of this temple is beautifully carved.

The temple is a fine example of Māru-Gurjara style, completed in 1161, which remains largely intact, and in religious use. The shikhara and the much lower superstructure over the mandapa are both among the "most complicated" in the style. The former begins with three rows of bhumija-style miniature towers in clusters, before turning to the sekhari style higher up, where the miniature towers are of varying lengths, and overlap. Over the mandapa, the lowest level continues the regular miniature tower clusters over the sanctuary, above which shallow pitched planes of roof are studded with miniature towers, with rows of beasts and urns along the edges of the planes. The surfaces are heavily decorated with figures and "honeycomb" gavaksha decoration, the figures "characterized by lively poses and sharply cut faces and costumes".

The red interior of the temple throws out in strong relief the 2.75 m white marble figure of Ajitnath, the second Tirthankara Ajitanatha seated in the shrine, decorated with precious stones let into the marble. The features wear the usual expression of deep repose or quiet covert scorn. On the right hand side of the temple, there are footprints of Rishabha and of the 20 Tirthankaras and on the left hand side, there are a temple of Gaumukha, the Samavasarana, and the Jambudvipa painting. Tejpala, brother of Vastupala, installed idols of Adinatha and Neminatha in the temple. On the outer platform of the main temple, there are idols of Padmavati and Kumarapala himself.

The original central image of Ajitanatha was destroyed and has been replaced by current one in 1422 by Govinda. Two white marble standing images of Ajitanatha besides the central images on north and south walls are brought from nearby villages and installed in 1297. Two more small Ajitanatha images in sanctum are dated 1247 and 1248.

The special times of pilgrimage are during the full moon in the months of Kartika and Chaitra (November and April). In the adjoining shrines are various images. In one is an upright block of marble with 208 representations of the Tirthankara.

=== Digambara Jain temples ===
Digambaras settled on this isolated hill with its three rocky peaks in early times. It is said that 35,000,000 monastics, including the Ganadharas Varadutta and Sagardutta, attained moksa here. The two hillocks named Kotishila and Siddhashila have shrines with idols of the Tirthankaras, Neminath and Mallinath dated Vikram Samvat 1292. There are fourteen Digambara temples in the foothills and a Digamabar dharamshalas is at the foothills. On the highest elevation of the three-peaked hill, there stands a "Tonk", a shrine built by Digambars, it houses a marble statue of the nineteenth Tirthankara, Mallinath.

The oldest temple in compound dedicated to Sambhavanatha was built in Maru-Gurjara architecture. Based on its construction style and ornamentation, according to historian Madhusudan Dhaky, it was built before 1030 CE.

=== Buddhist monuments ===
The earliest archaeological finds were reported in 1938. The Taranga hill bears the name of Taringa or Taranga, probably from a shrine of Taran Mata.

About 2.5 km north of the hill, the shrines of Taran Mata and Dharan Mata is situated near a natural stream. The marble idol of Taran Mata is dated to the 8th–9th century based on its style. Few Buddhist images including one of Avalokiteshwara Padmapani were also found in these two shrines. The construction of the right side of the stream is probably an altered Buddhist stupa.

There are also ancient cave shelters. Nearby cave, locally known as Jogida ni Gafa, has a relics of four Buddhist statues known as Dhyani Buddhas under the Bodhivriksha. The cave was used by Buddhist monks years ago. These caves are ascribed to the 4th–5th century.

== Archaeology ==
In 2009, Gujarat State Archeology Department found 4 km long fortification southwest of Taranga hills. It is estimated that it belongs to 3rd or 4th century BCE. It could be the historical Anarta or Anandpur which is generally identified with Vadnagar now.

== Gallery ==
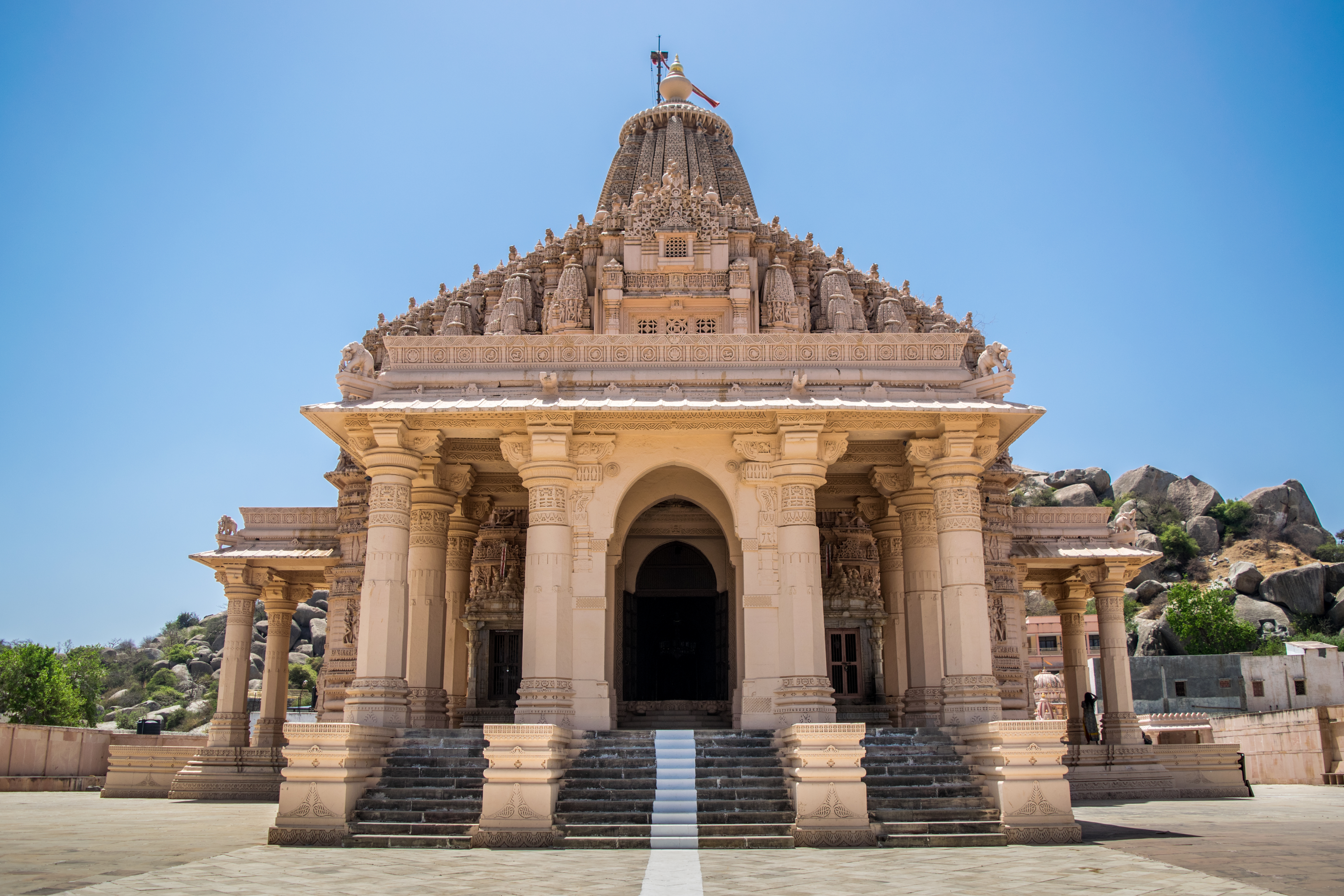
Front view

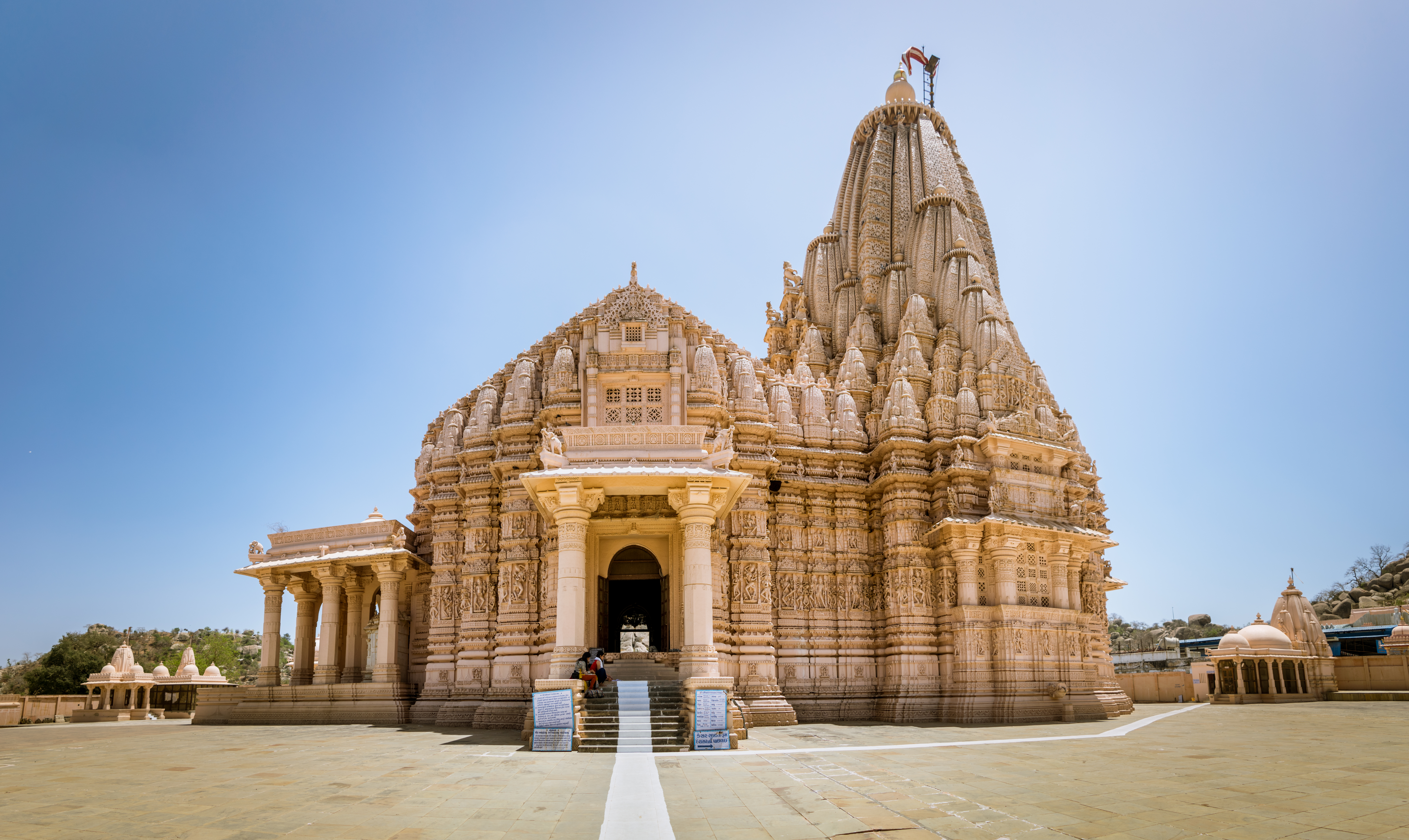
Entrance to the temple

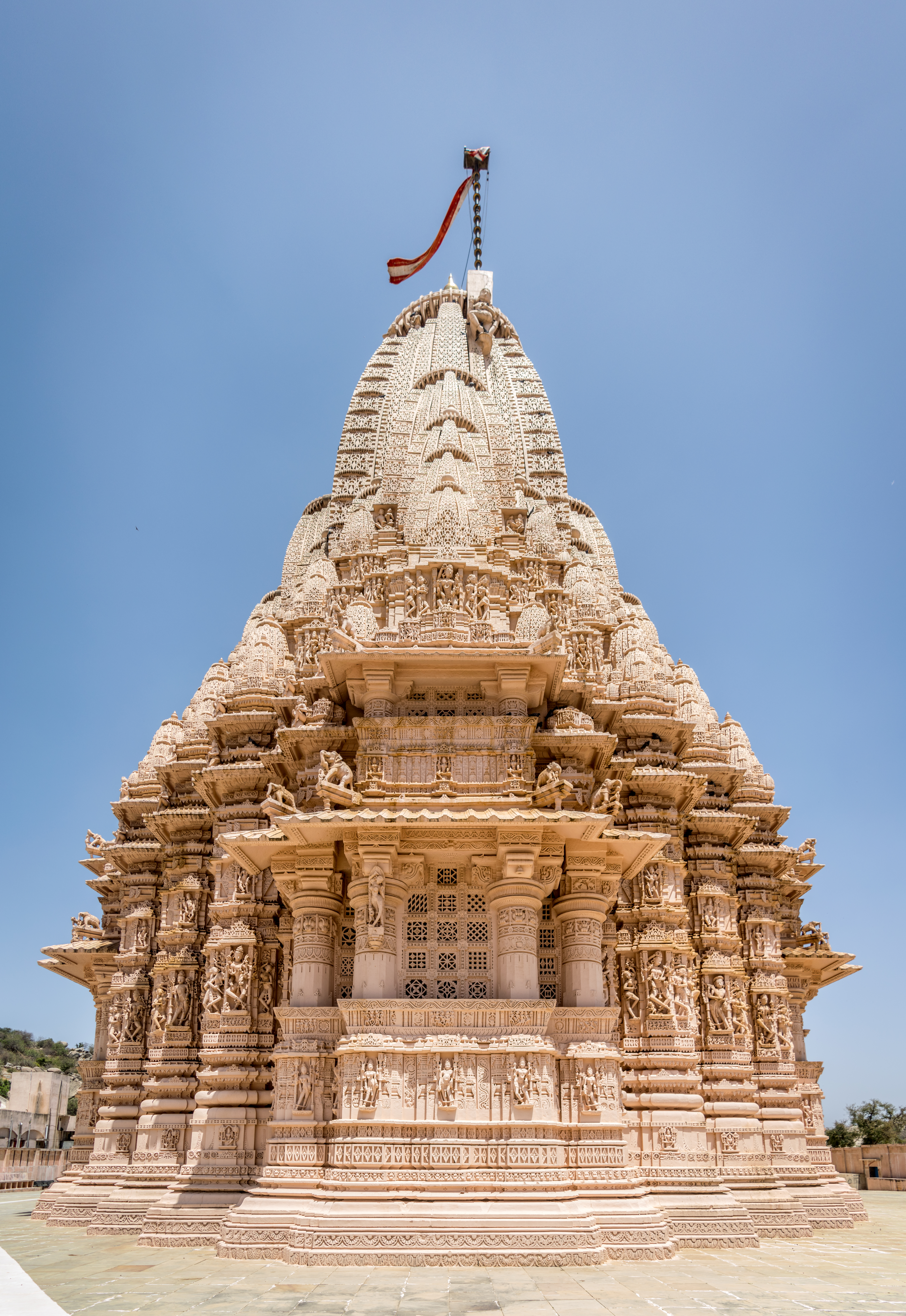
Back view

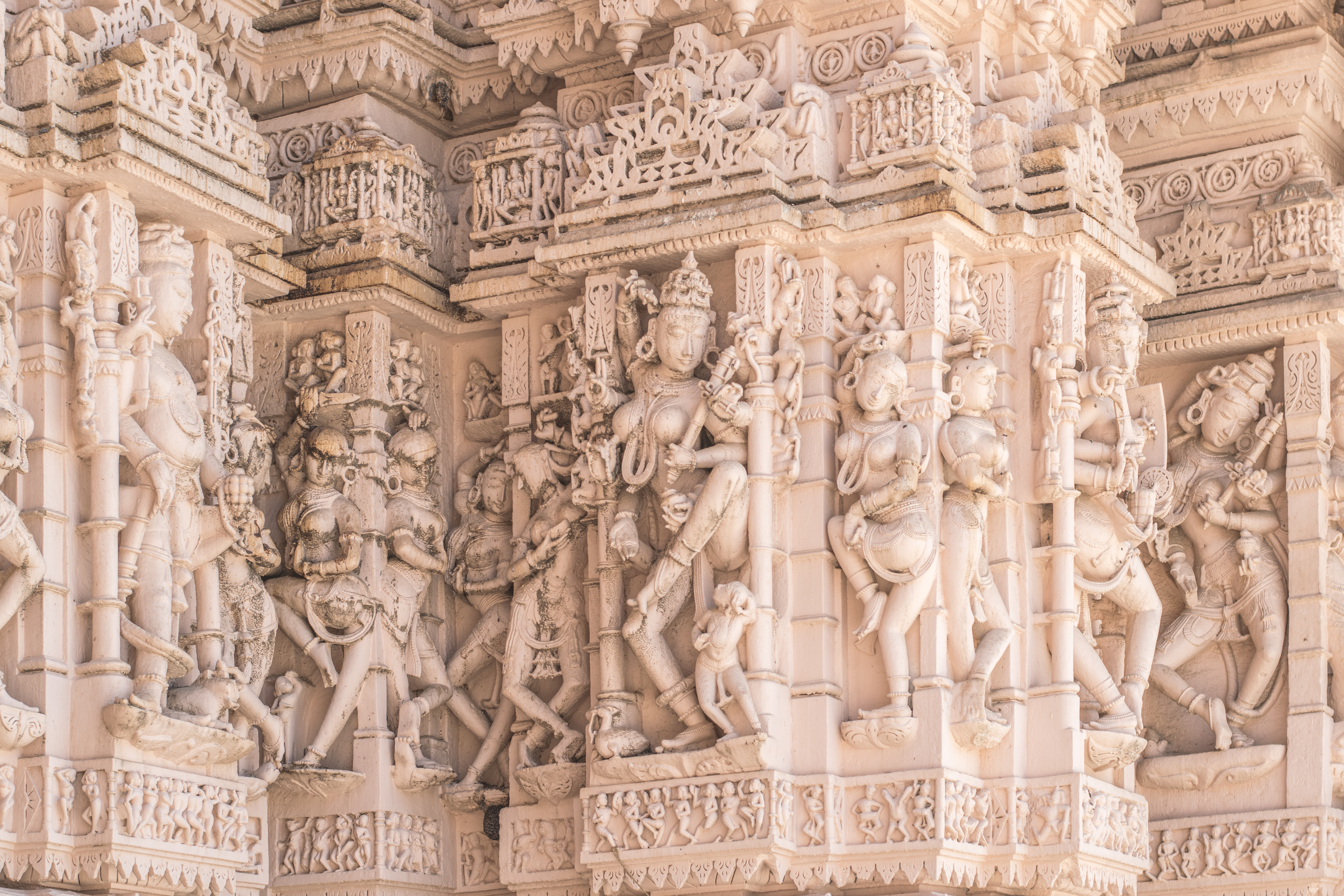
Wall carvings

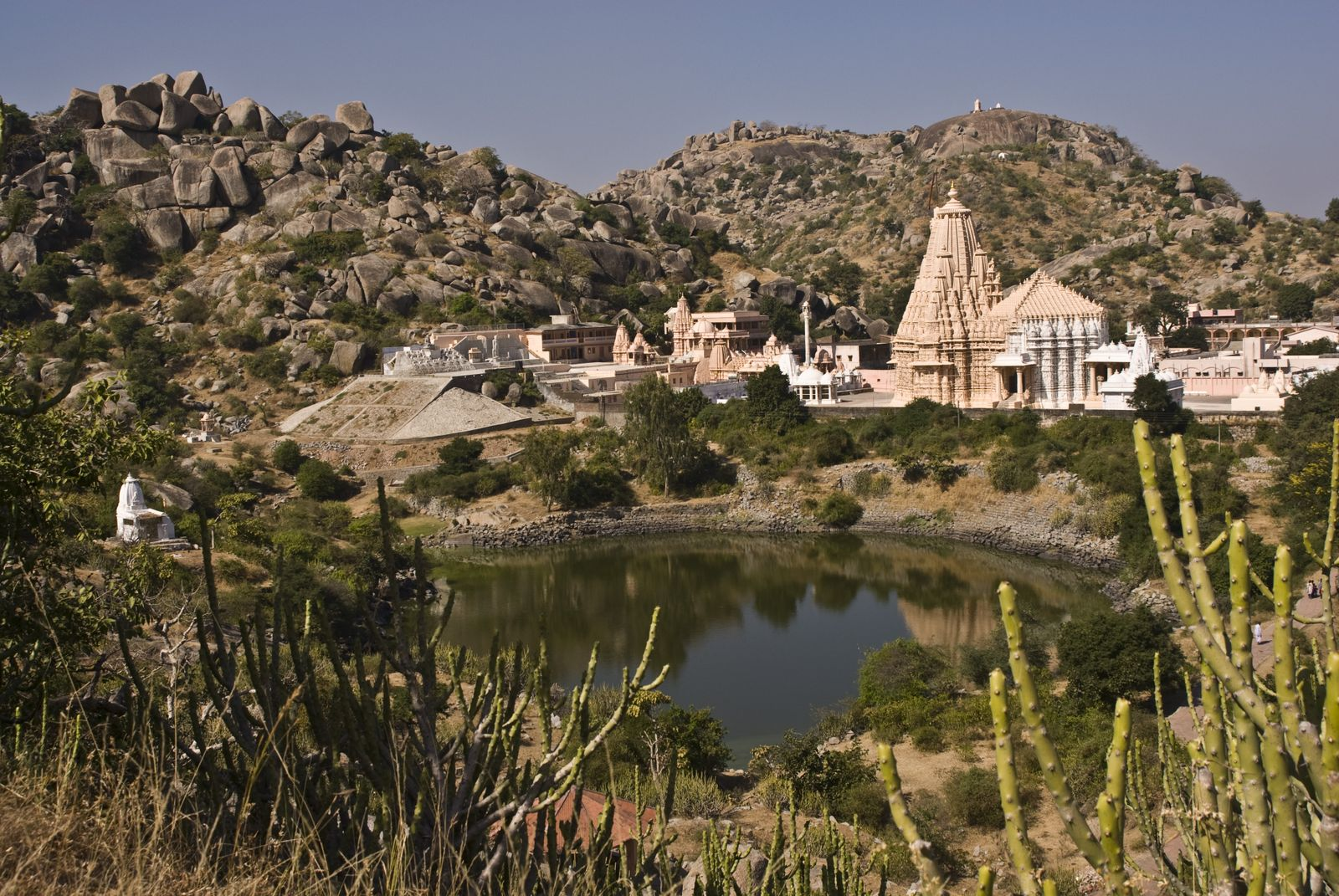
Nearby pond and the temple in background

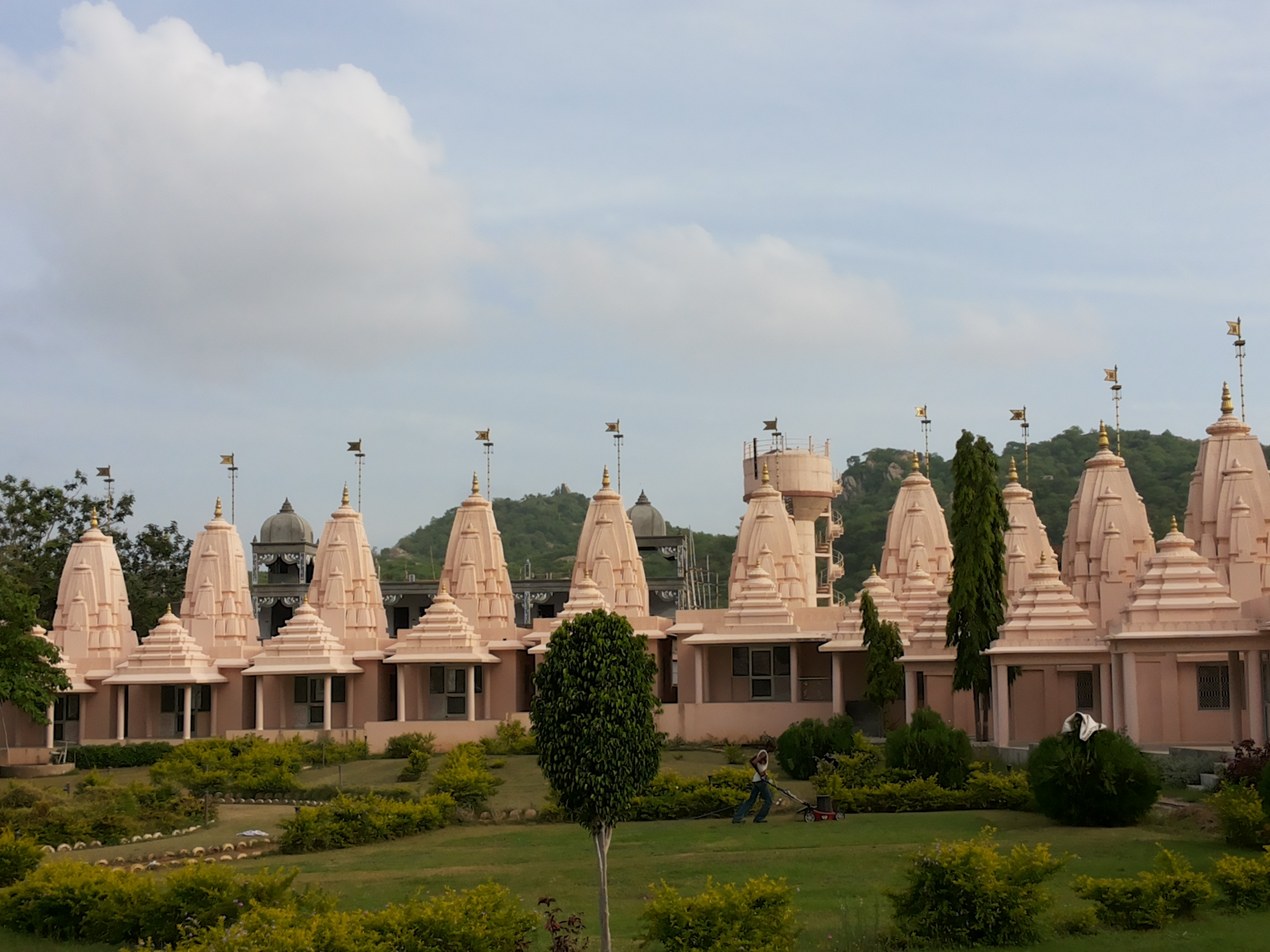
Temples of Taranga

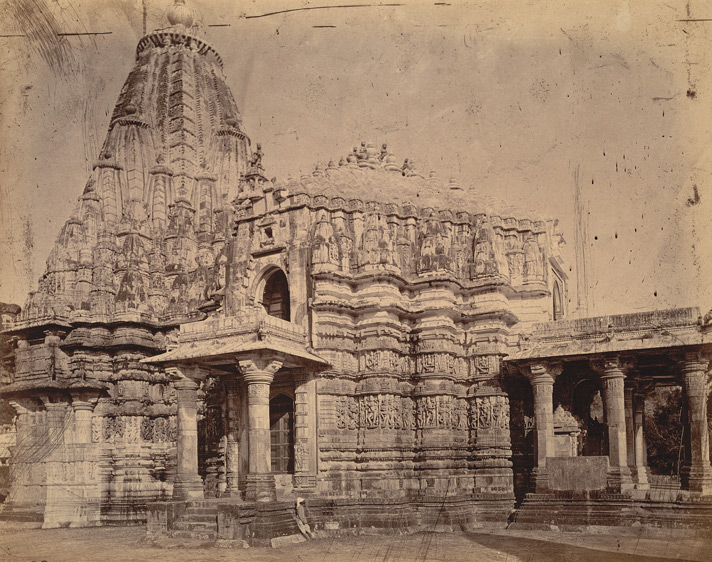
Temple in 1890

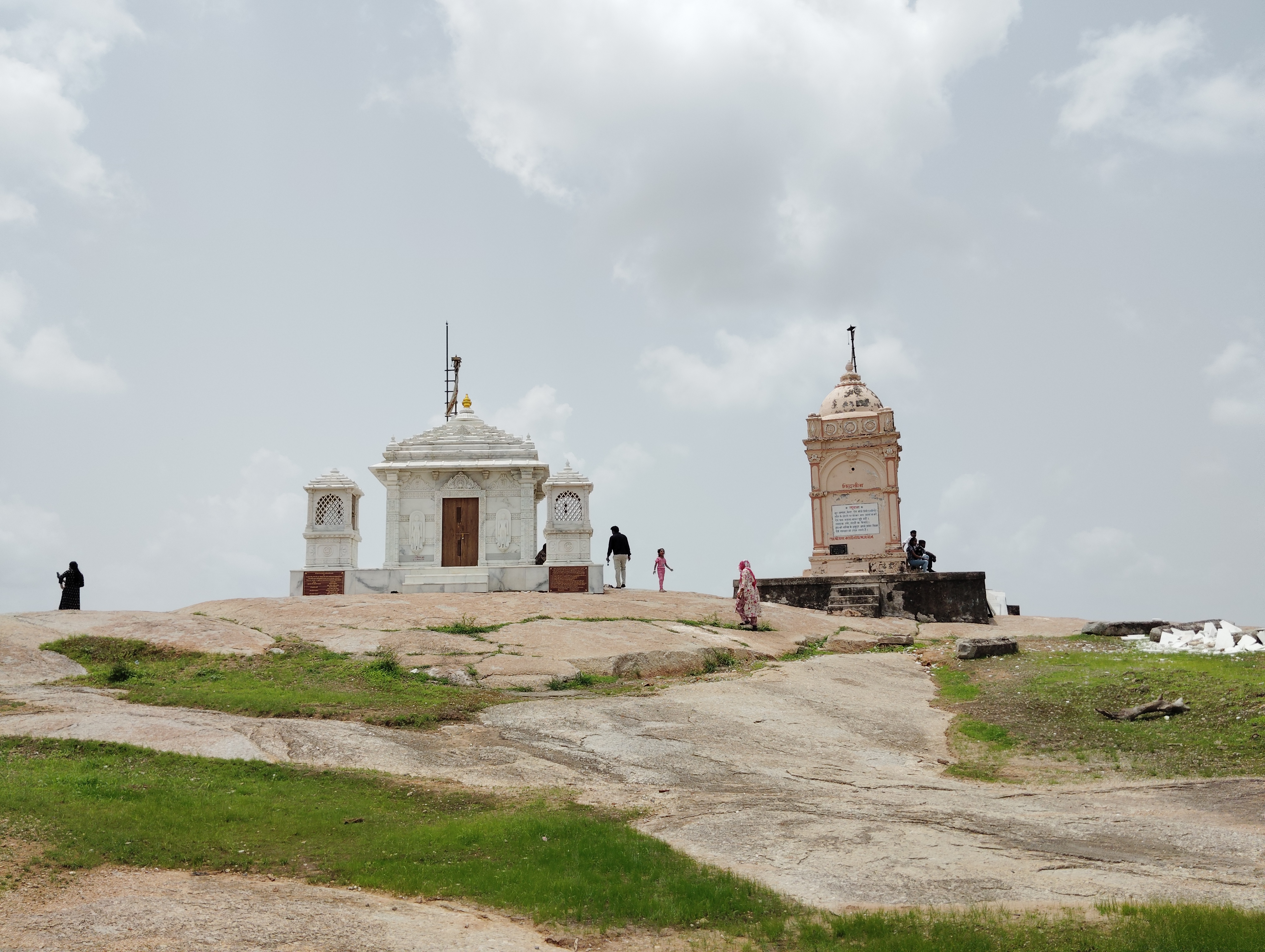
Jain shrines on Siddhashila hill

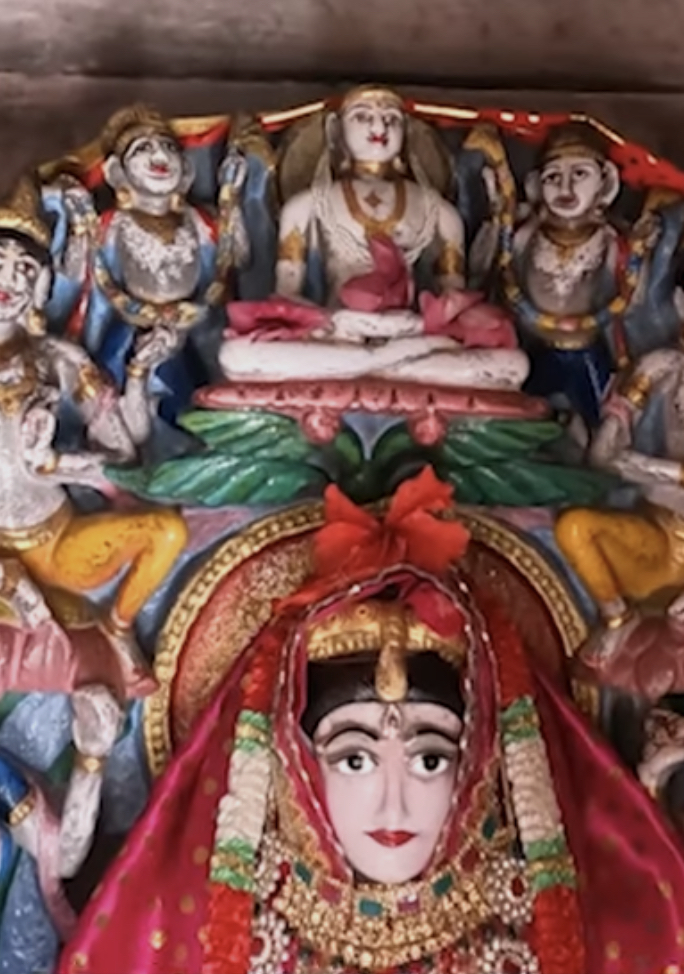
Dharan Mata Temple

== See also ==
- Jainism in Gujarat
