= Arvind (company) =

Indian textile company

Arvind Limited
- Arvind (company) logo

- Arvind store at RR Nagar, Bengaluru (2026)
- Formerly: Arvind Mills Limited (1931–2008)
- Type: Public
- Traded as: NSE: ARVIND; BSE: 500101
- Industry: Conglomerate
- Founded: 1931; 95 years ago
- Founder: Kasturbhai Lalbhai
- Headquarters: Ahmedabad, India
- Products: Denim, knits, woven, engineering, retail, telecom, advanced material, agribusiness, real estate, the Arvind Store
- Revenue: ▲₹8,329 crore (US$860 million) (2025)
- Net income: ▲₹367 crore (US$38 million) (2025)
- Number of employees: 25,833
- Parent: Lalbhai Group
- Website: www.arvind.com

Arvind Limited (formerly Arvind Mills) is an Indian textile manufacturer and the flagship company of the Lalbhai Group. Founded in 1931 by Kasturbhai Lalbhai along with his brothers Chhotalal and Narbheram, the company is headquartered in Naroda, Ahmedabad, Gujarat, with additional units at Santej (near Kalol). Arvind manufactures cotton shirting, denim, knits, and bottomweight (khaki) fabrics. In 2011, it diversified into technical textiles through its Advanced Materials Division. The company is the largest producer of denim in India.

Sanjaybhai Lalbhai is the current chairman and managing director of Arvind and Lalbhai Group. In the early 1980s, he led the 'Reno-vision' whereby the company brought denim into the domestic market, thus starting the jeans revolution in India. Today it retails its own brands like Flying Machine, Newport and Excalibur and licensed international brands like Arrow, Tommy Hilfiger, and Calvin Klein through its nationwide retail network. Arvind also runs three clothing and accessories retail chains, the Arvind Store, Unlimited and Megamart, which stocks company brands.

== Arvind Mills ==
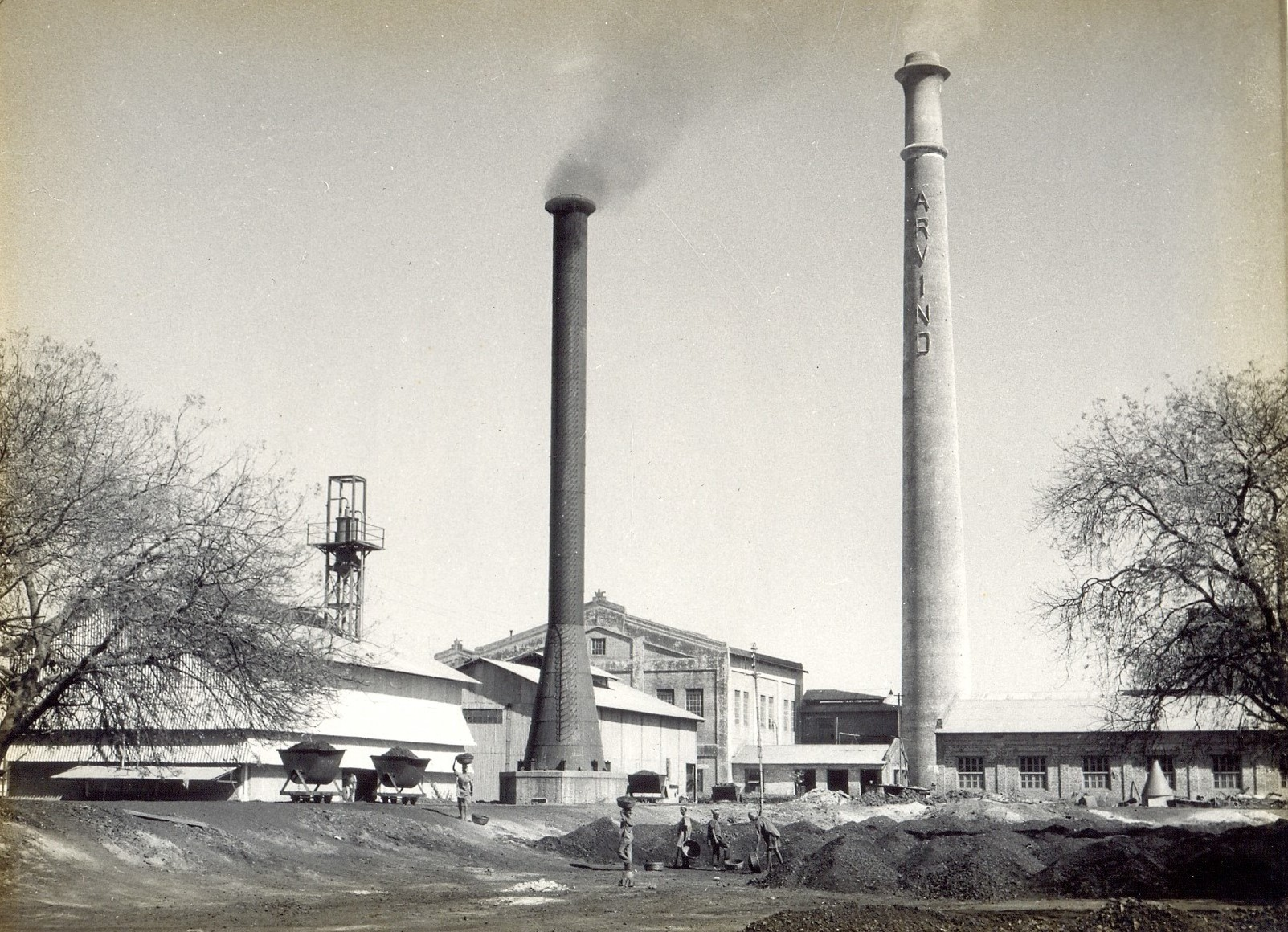
Arvind Mill in 1930s

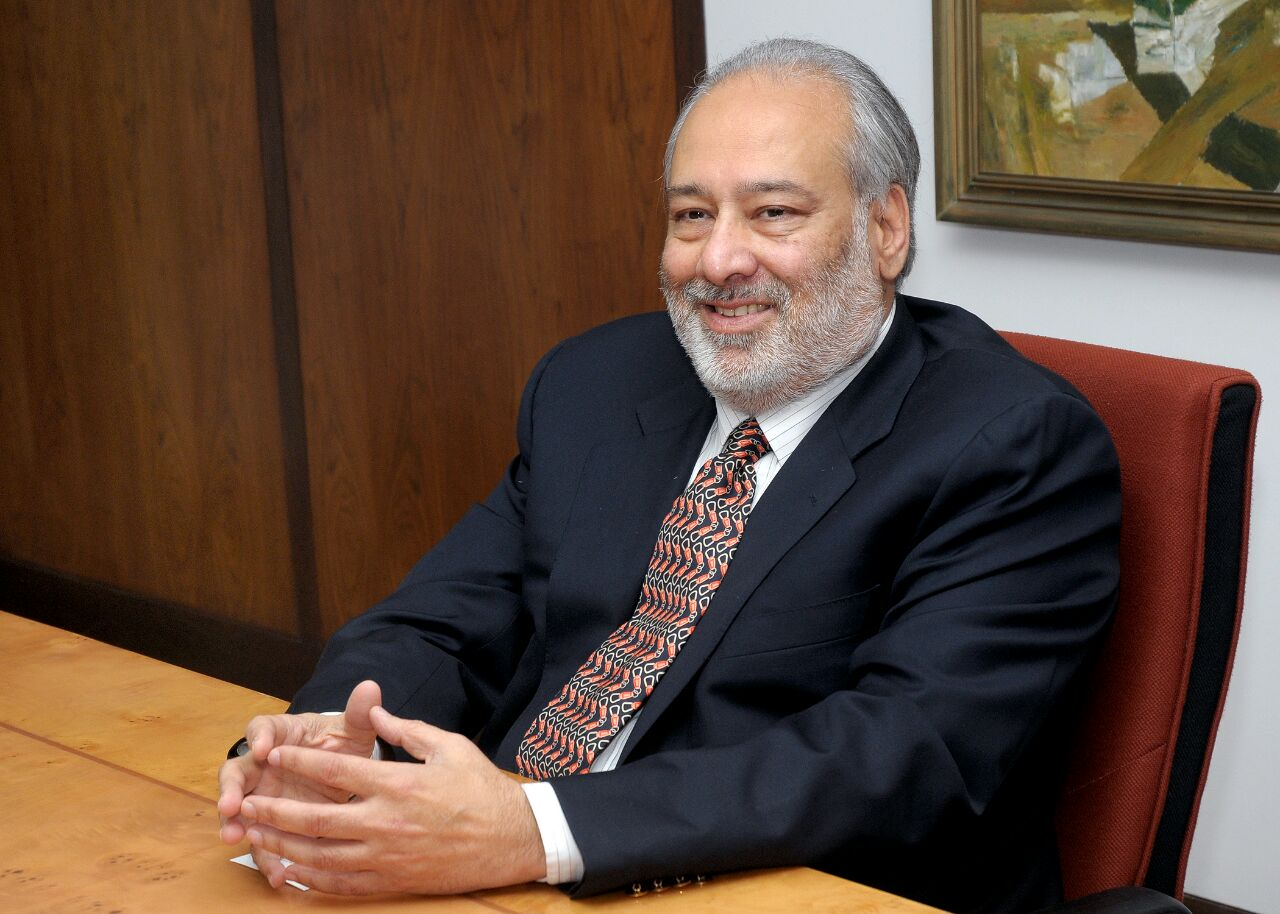
Sanjay Lalbhai, the Chairman and managing director of Arvind Limited

== History and operations ==
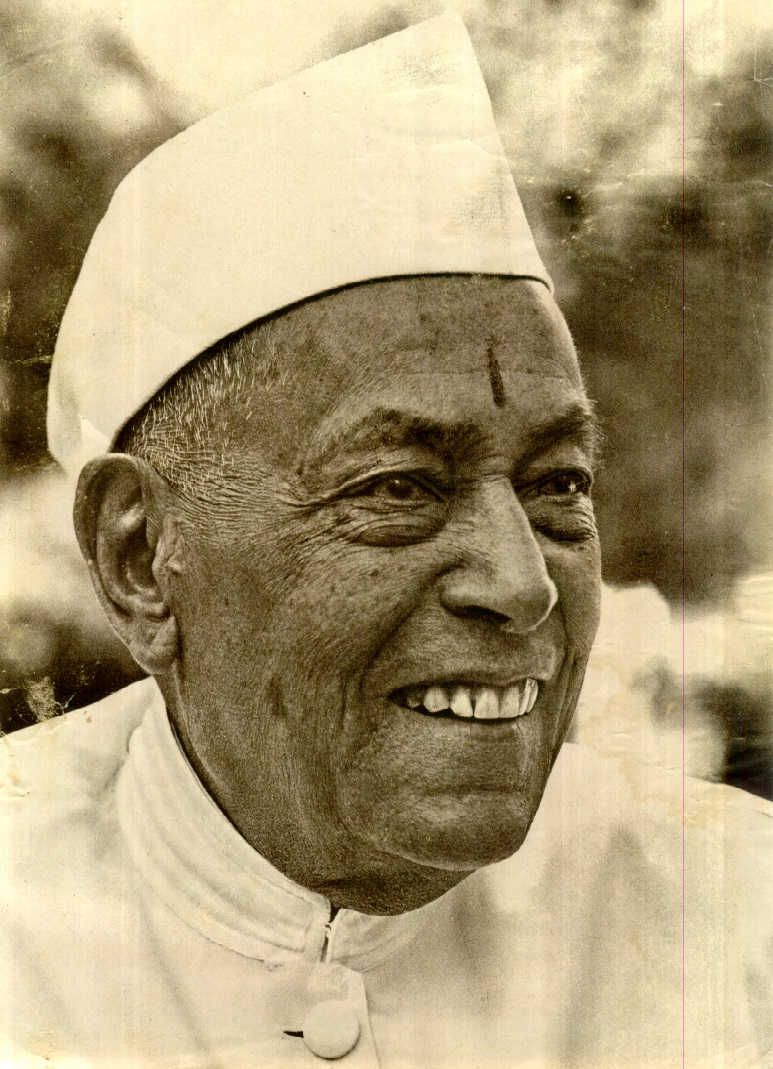
Kasturbhai Lalbhai, the co-founder of Arvind Mills

- 1897: Arvind Mills started a business for sarees.
- 1931: Arvind Mills Ltd was incorporated by three brothers Kasturbhai, Narottambhai and Chimanbhai. with a share capital of ₹165,000 ($2500) in Ahmedabad. The products manufactured were dhoties, sarees, mulls, dorias, crepes, shirtings, lingerie, coatings, printed lawns and voiles cambrics, twills and gaberdine.
- 1934: Became established as the foremost textile units in the country.
- 1985: Diversified into electronics by setting up a plant to manufacture electronic telephone exchanges (EPABX) and also entering into marketing pharmaceutical products and B&W and colour television sets under the name Pyramid.
- 1986: Became the first company in India to bring globally accepted fabrics such as Denim yarn dyed shirting fabrics & wrinkle free gabardines.
- 1987: The company took up a modernisation program to triple the production of denim cloth and to produce double yarn fabrics for exports. The new product groups identified were: indigo dyed blue denim and high quality two-ply fabrics for exports, and products such as butta sarees, full voiles and dhoties. It also started retail outlets for 'Arrow' brand and became the first company in India to bring international shirt brand 'Arrow'.
- 1991: Arvind reached 100 million meters of denim per year, becoming the fourth-largest producer of denim in the world.
- 1992: The company increased production of denim cloth by 23,000 tonnes per day by modernising the plant at Khatraj of Ankur Textiles.
- 1994: The company's operations were divided into textile, telecom and garments divisions.
- 1995: The garment division launched ready to stitch jeans pack under the brand Ruf & Tuf.
- 1997: The marketing and distribution network of the Newport brand was strengthened and the relaunched Flying Machine and Ruggers brands were strengthened.
  - Arvind Mills set up an anti-piracy cell for the first time in India to curb large scale counterfeiting of their brands Ruf & Tuf and Newport jeans.
  - Arvind Mills adopted the franchisee system for manufacturing and distribution of Ruf & Tuf jeans.
  - Arvind Fashions doubled capacity at the Bangalore manufacturing facility to produce Lee jeans.
- 1998: Arvind Mills emerged as the world's third largest manufacturer of denim.
  - Arvind Mills went live with SAP R/3 ERP package in April 1997 in their new manufacturing units.
- 2001 (February): The company increased the number of Spindles and Stitching Machines by 2036 Nos and 38 Nos respectively.
- 2003: For the fourth quarter, Arvind Mills saw a 280% growth in net profit.
  - Arvind Mills Ltd was assigned a "P1+" rating by CRISIL, which indicated a very strong rating for their commercial paper.
  - It increased the number of Stitching machines by 7 Nos.
- 2004: Expanded their shirts manufacturing capacity from 2.4 million pieces to 4.8 million pieces per annum. Its subsidiary company Arvind Spinning Ltd commenced its operation.
- 2005: For the fourth quarter in a row, Arvind Mills posted a profit growth in excess of 80%.
  - Arvind Mills bought the entire stake in Arvind Brands from ICICI Ventures.
  - commenced their operations of producing Jeans Pant in Bangalore with the installed capacity of 4 million Pcs per annum from March.
- 2006: New Denim collection was launched aimed at Super Premium brands of US, Europe, Japan and Korea. Also opened new venues for the Denim division as response to this collection was good.
  - April: Demerge and transfer of the Garments Business Division to their 100% subsidiary company Arvind Brands Ltd and amalgamating Arvind Fashions Ltd a 100% subsidiary of Arvind Brands Ltd with Arvind Mills. Joint venture with company Arvind Murjani Brand Pvt Ltd through which they hold license to sell Tommy Hilfiger brand apparel in India.
  - August: Wholesale branded apparel business of Arvind Fashions Ltd sold to VF Arvind Brands Pvt Ltd.
- 2007: Arvind expanded its presence in the retail segment by establishing MegaMart, one of India's largest value retail chains.
- 2008: From March, the company signed an exclusive license agreement with Philips-Van Heusen Corporation (PVH) for designing, distribution and retailing of IZOD brand apparels in India.
  - May: Company's name changed from Arvind Mills Ltd to Arvind Ltd to accurately reflect the multi-faceted nature of the organization.
- 2010: Arvind launched "Arvind Store", a concept showcasing the company's best fabrics, brands and bespoke styling and tailoring solutions under one roof.
  - September: Set up a 30 million meters of denim manufacturing plant in Bangladesh with a total investment of $60 million in joint venture with Nitol group where the latter would have 20% stake in the joint venture company.
  - Arvind launched its first major real estate project.
  - Arvind became one of India's largest producers of fire protection fabrics.
- 2011 (November): Arvind announced that it had divested its minority stake of 40% in VF Arvind Brands Private Limited (VFABPL), which was engaged in marketing products under the brands Lee and Wrangler and was formed in September 2006 with 60:40 shareholding between VF Mauritius and Arvind, to VF Mauritius for ₹257 crore. Arvind share in the Joint Venture was ₹5.47 crore as the capital of the joint venture company.
- 2012: joint venture with PD Group, Germany, for manufacturing glass fabrics.
- 2012: Arvind's subsidiary Arvind Lifestyle Brands acquired the business operations of British fashion retailers Debenhams and Next and American Lifestyle brand Nautica in India from Planet Retail.
- 2014: joint venture with PVH for Calvin Klein Businesses in India.
  - Launched formal suits with Goodhill Corporation Limited of Japan.

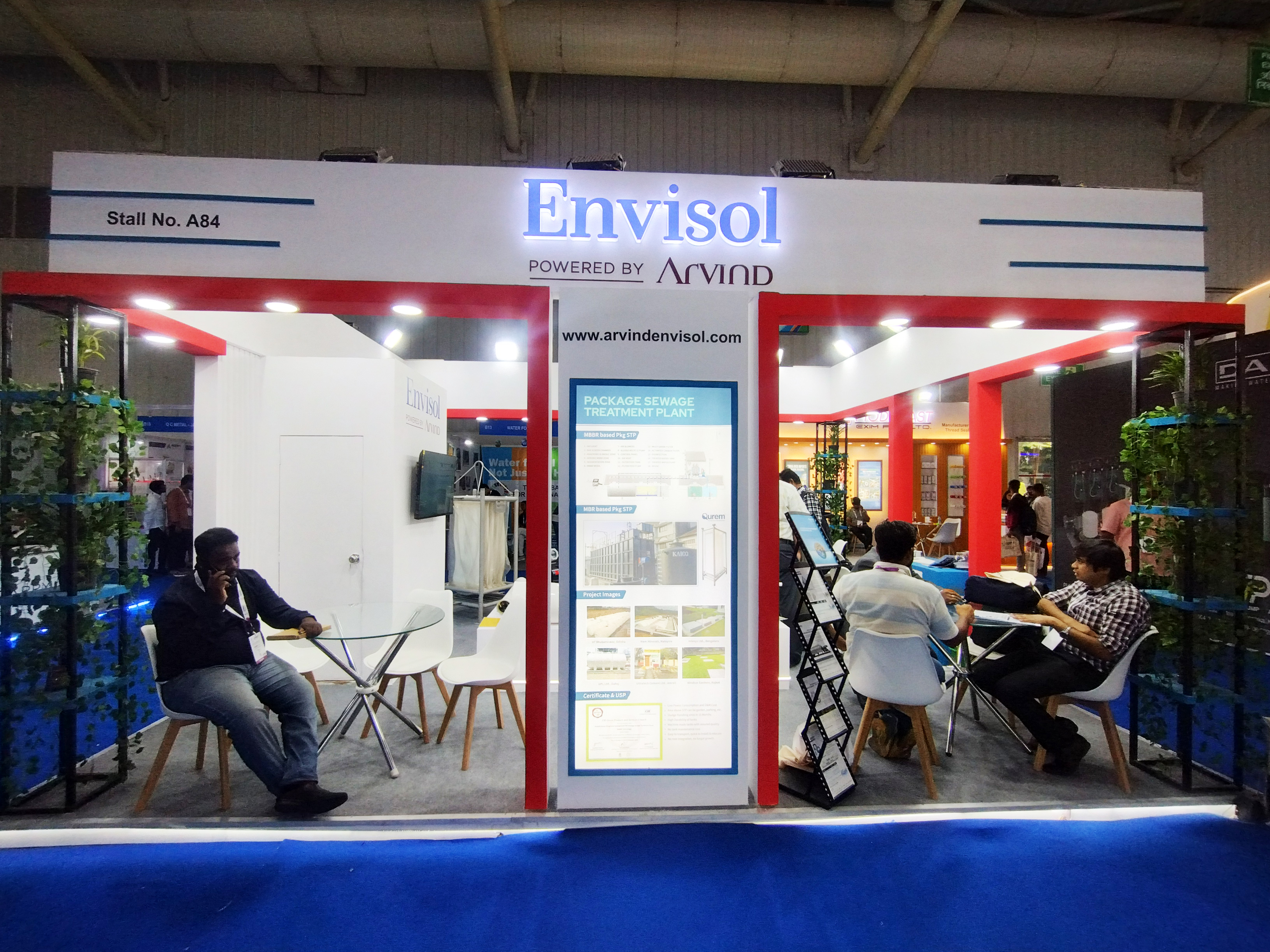
Envisol at Plumbex India 2026, BIEC

  - Arvind Envisol, a subsidiary of the company providing waste water treatment solutions acquired a global patent for its Polymeric Film Evaporation Technology (PFET) as this revolutionary technology helps it to save 80% energy cost for Envisol's Zero Liquid Discharge water treatment system.
- 2014: joint venture with OG Corp, Japan, for manufacturing and sale of non-woven fabrics, the project being spearheaded by Dr. Kunal Shah.
- 2014: forayed into the E-commerce segment with custom clothing brand Creyate, offering fine bespoke menswear with a degree of customisation rarely found.
- 2014: The company published its first Sustainability Report, 'Fundamentally Right'.
- 2015: partnered with USA-headquartered Invista, owner of the Lycra fibre brand to manufacture stretch denim fabric in India.
  - Company launched denim fabric Khadi Denim.
  - Collaborated with world's largest internet giant and most renowned denim brand and launches wearable denim technology and smart denim jackets.
  - Launched a 4-in-1 smart shirt in association with Arrow.
- 2016: The company entered online retailing with NNNow.com, a one-stop shopping destination for trendsetters across India.
- 2016: GAP joined hands with Arvind to sell apparels through NNNow.com
- 2016: Arvind Fashion Brands tied up with cricket legend Sachin Tendulkar and launched True Blue, a menswear label that embodies the spirit of the global Indian.
- 2016 (October) announced decision to generate about ₹740 crores by diluting 10% stake in its brand business arm pegging its enterprise value at ₹8,000 crore and same would be picked up by Multiples, the Private Equity firm founded by Renuka Ramnath.
- 2017: Launched its own Ready-To-Wear brand.
  - October: signed a Memorandum of Understanding (MoU) with the Gujarat state government to establish a mega apparel factory in the state, a ₹300 crore project in Dahegam with capacity to produce over 24 million garments once fully operational.
  - November: India's largest textile and branded apparel player announced decision to demerge its Branded Apparel and Engineering businesses from the parent company, into the entity Arvind Fashions Limited and the shareholders of Arvind Limited would be entitled for one equity share of Arvind Fashions Limited for every five shares held by them in parent company. Engineering business would be demerged into an entity named as Anup Engineering and would be engaged in the manufacturing of critical process equipment and Shareholders of Arvind Limited will be entitled for 1 equity shares of Anup Engineering Limited for 27 shares held by them in parent company. Both the companies were planned to be listed on BSE and NSE on completion of process.
- 2018 (March): Adient (NYSE: ADNT), announced the formation of Adient Arvind Automotive Fabrics a joint venture with Arvind Limited for development, manufacture and sale of automotive fabrics in India and the new company would be based in Ahmedabad, India, and would manufacture fabrics for automotive seating at a fabric manufacturing facility.

== Financial restructuring ==
In the mid-1990s, the company undertook a massive expansion of its denim capacity even though other cotton fabrics were slowly replacing the demand for denim. The expansion plan was funded by loans from both Indian and overseas financial institutions. With the demand for denim slowing, the company found it difficult to repay the loans, resulting in an increased interest burden on the loans. In the late 1990s, the company encountered financial problems due to its debt burden, resulting in incurring significant losses.

The company came up with a debt-restructuring plan for the long-term debts being taken up in February 2001. This complex financial restructuring exercise, which involved several domestic and international lenders, is considered to be the benchmark and a case study in India. The restructuring was overseen by Jayesh Shah, CFO, and advised on by a JP Morgan Hong Kong team, led by Ahmad Ayaz.

The restructuring of Arvind's debt has been cited in business literature as one of the earliest large-scale corporate debt restructuring exercises in India, illustrating how operational turnaround initiatives were combined with financial reorganization to restore long-term viability.

In 2018, Arvind Ltd. demerged its branded apparel and engineering business into separate entities for enhanced focus and value addition for the shareholders of the Company. It got the nod from NCLT Ahmedabad bench for demerger in Oct 2018. Arvind Fashions, the branded apparel entity, will be scaling up existing brand portfolio and improve profitability across brands. Anveshan Heavy Engineering, earlier known as Anup Engineering, has laid down capex plans of ₹80 crore to double existing fabrication capacity of 15,000 tonnes per annum by implementing product mix. Out of the planned investment, ₹40 crore has already been invested.

== See also ==
- Kasturbhai Lalbhai
