= Dilwara Temples =

Group of Svetambara Jain temples in Rajasthan, India

Delwada jain temples
- દેલવાડાનાં જિનમંદિરો
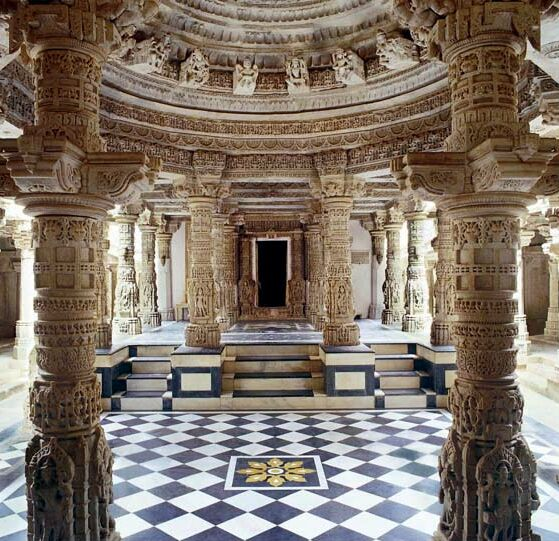
- Vimal Vasahi Temple

- Location within Rajasthan

Religion
- Affiliation: Jainism
- Deity: Rishabhanatha; Neminatha; Parshvanatha; Mahavira
- Festivals: Mahavir Janma Kalyanak, Paryushan
- Governing body: Seth Shri Kalyanji Parmanandji Pedhi

Location
- Location: Mount Abu, Sirohi, Rajasthan, India
- Coordinates: 24°36′33.5″N 72°43′23″E

Architecture
- Creator: Vimal Shah; Vastupal-Tejpal
- Established: 1031
- Completed: 1582
- Temple: 5

Website
- www.dilwarajaintemple.org

The Delwada Temples or Delvada Temples are a group of Śvētāmbara Jain temples located about 2 1/2 kilometres from the Mount Abu settlement in Sirohi District, Rajasthan's only hill station. Delwara Temples are among 5 Maha tirths of Svetambara sect along with Shatrunjay, Girnar, Sammed Shikharji and Ashtapad.

It holds same importance or even more than other maha tirths. The earliest were built by Vimal Shah, a Jain minister of Solanki king of Gurjaratra, Bhima I and additions to the temples were made by Vastupala, Jain minister of Vaghelas of Gurjaratra. They date between the 11th and 16th centuries, forming some of the most famous monuments in the style of Solanki architecture, famous for their use of a very pure white marble and intricate marble carvings. They are managed by Seth Shri Kalyanji Anandji Pedhi, Sirohi and are a pilgrimage place for Jains, and a significant general tourist attraction. The Dilwara temples are regarded as the most impressive among Jain temples in Rajasthan.

== Architecture ==
The five Dilwara temples are among the most famous Jain temples. The Vimal Vasahi is much the earliest, constructed by 1031, with the Luna Vasahi by 1230, and the others at intervals between 1459 and 1582. All are in white marble which adds greatly to their effect and remains in use. The oldest and largest two have large amounts of intricate carving even by the standards of the style, reaching a peak in the Luna Vasahi temple. The main buildings of the first three named are surrounded by "cloister" screens of devakulikā shrines, and are fairly plain on the outer walls of these; in the case of the Vimal Vasahi this screen was a later addition, around the time of the second temple. These three have an axis from the sanctuary through a closed, then an open mandapa to an open rangamandapa, or larger hall for dance or drama. Surrounding the main temple with a curtain of shrines was to become a distinctive feature of the Jain temples of West India, still employed in some modern temples.

In later temples in the Māru-Gurjara style, a very pure white marble like that at Dilwara came to be regarded as highly desirable, even essential. In modern times, when the style has become popular in other regions of India, and with Hindu and Jain communities in other countries, local Rajastani marble is often carved and transported to the new building.

The temples have an opulent entranceway, the simplicity in architecture reflecting Jain values like honesty and frugality. The ornamental detail spreading over the minutely carved ceilings, doorways, pillars, and panels is considered to be remarkable. It is said that workmen were paid in gold according to the weight of marble powder scraped off.

== Five Temples ==
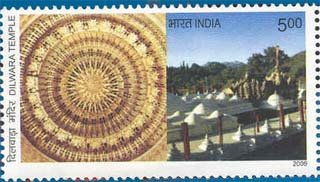
Stamp of Dilwara Temples issued in 2019

The temple complex is in the midst of a range of forested hills. There are five temples in all, each with its own unique identity. All the five temples are enclosed within a single high walled compound. The group is named after the small village of Dilwara or Delvara in which they are located. The five temples are:

1. Vimal Vasahi, dedicated to the 1st tirthankara, Rishabhanatha (Adinatha).
2. Luna Vasahi, dedicated to the 22nd tirthankara, Neminatha.
3. Pittalhar temple, dedicated to Adinatha.
4. Parshvanath temple, dedicated to the 23rd tirthankara, Parshvanatha.
5. Mahavir Swami temple, dedicated to the 24th tirthankara, Mahavira.

Among the five marble temples of Dilwara, the most famous are the Vimal Vasahi and the Luna Vasahi temples. Dilwara Temples along with Ashtapad, Girnar, Shatrunjaya and Shikharji are known as Śvētāmbara Pancha Tirth (five principal pilgrimage shrine).

=== Vimal Vasahi Temple ===
The Adinatha or Vimala Vasahi Temple is carved entirely out of white marble and was mostly built in 1026 by Vimal Shah, a minister of Bhima I, the Chaulukya king of Gujarat. The outer mandapa is an addition of the next century. The temple is dedicated to Rishabhanatha. The temple stands in an open courtyard surrounded by a corridor, which has numerous cells containing smaller idols of the tirthankaras. The richly carved corridors, pillars, arches, and 'mandaps' or porticoes of the temple are simply amazing.

The ceilings feature engraved designs of lotus-buds, petals, flowers and scenes from Jain mythology. The figures of animal life, life journey from dream to incarnation of tirthankars are carved. There are 59 devakulikas (small shrine) facing the main image of Rishabhanatha. There are 7 additional cells are found, 1 cell houses image of Ambika and 2 cells of Munisuvrata. The mulnayak idol of Rishabhanatha is carved with attendant deities and images of 4 tirthankaras, giving the idol name Saparikar Panchtirthi. The principal shrine was originally surrounded by 24 sub-shrines but later 74 shub-shrines were added in the 12th century.

The Navchowki is a collection of nine rectangular ceilings, each containing carvings of different designs supported on ornate pillars. The Gudh mandap is a simple hall after stepping inside its heavily decorated doorway. The Gudh mandap, houses two idols of Parshvanatha in Kayotsarga position, and an image of Rishabhanatha. The mandap is meant for Aarti to the deity. The ceiling has carvings of horses, elephants, musician, dancers and soldier. The ceiling of the main dome features carving of the sixteen devis associated with learning.

The Hastishala (Elephant courtyard) was constructed by Prithvipal, a descendant of Vimal Shah in 1147-49 and features a row of elephants in sculpture with the members of the family riding them.

=== Luna Vasahi ===
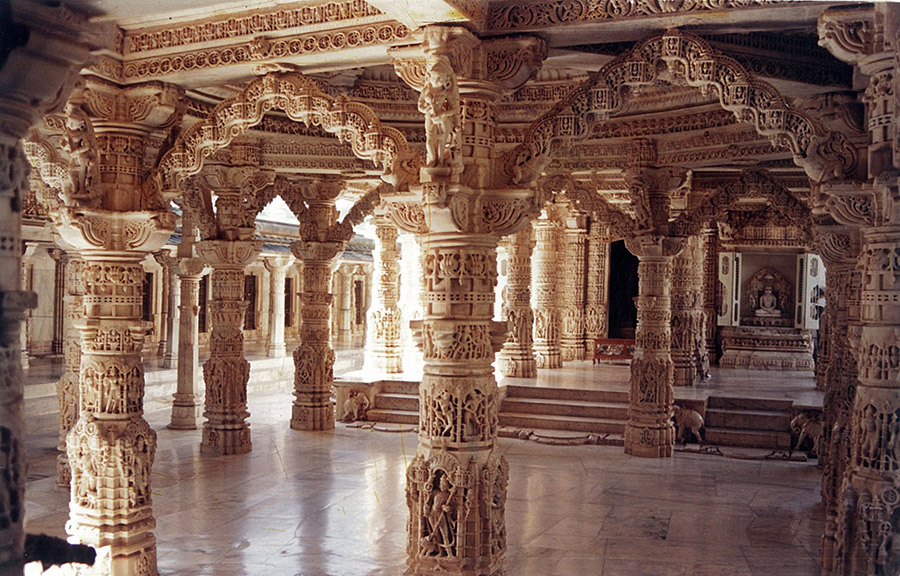
Intricate carvings of Luna Vasahi

The Luna Vasahi or Neminatha temple is dedicated to Neminatha. The temple was built in 1230 by two Porwad brothers - Vastupal and Tejpal - both ministers of a Virdhaval, the Vaghela ruler of Gujarat. The temple, built in memory of Vastupal & Tejpal's late brother Lunig, was designed after the Vimal Vashi temple. The temple has a similar structure as Vimala Vasahi but has better carvings. The Rang mandap (main hall) features a central dome from which hangs a big ornamental pendant. Arranged in a circular band are 72 figures of tirthankaras in sitting posture; under this band are 360 small figures of Jain monks in another circular band. The Hathishala (elephant cell) features 10 marble elephants, polished and realistically modelled. A special feature of the temple is the two niches of Derani (wife of younger brother) and Jethani (wife of older brother), the wives of Vastupal and Tejpal respectively. The niches have the image of the goddess Lakshmi with sculptures of tirthankaras Sambhavanatha and Shantinatha respectively.

There are 47 sub-shrines housing one or more images of tirthankaras. The first shrine houses an idol of the goddess Ambika. The ninth and eleventh enshrines images of Neminatha's life after renunciation and Neminatha's marriage respectively. The fourteenth shrine has images of the life events of Shantinatha. In the thirty-seventh shrine, there are images of four goddesses. There are several images of life events of Krishna as well. There are a total of 130 pillars in the temple of which 38 are beautifully carved.

The Navchowki features some of the most delicate marble stone cutting work of the temple. The ceilings of the temple depicts scenes of the life of Neminatha with image of Rajmathi (who was to marry Neminatha) and Krishna. The Gudh mandap features a black marble idol of Neminatha. The carvings of devkulikas and Chakreshvari in the ceiling of temple are also noteworthy. The Kirti Stambha(pillar of pride), big black stone pillar on the left of the temple, was constructed by Maharana Kumbha of Mewar. The remaining three temples of Dilwara are smaller.

=== Pittalhar Temple ===
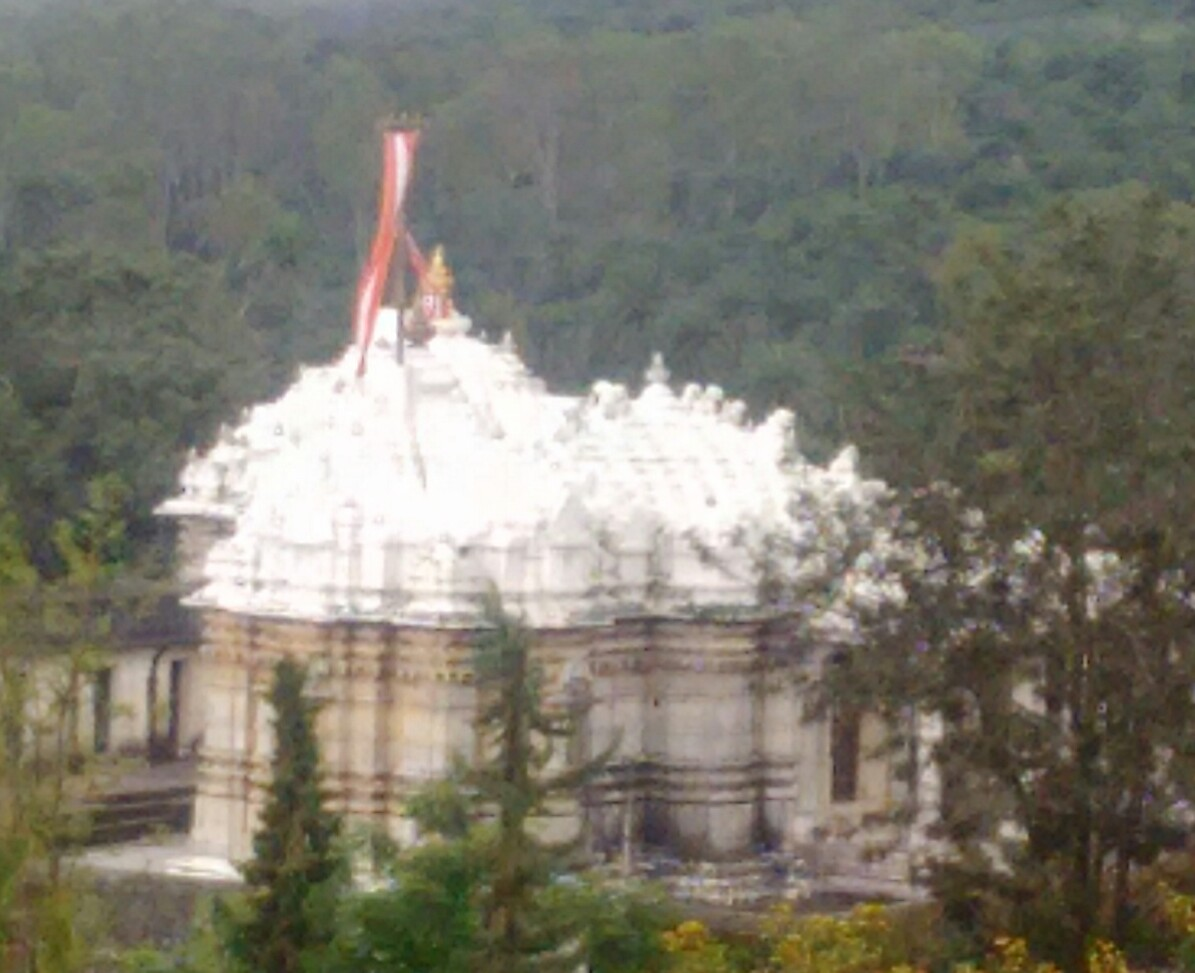
Pittalhar Temple

The Pittalhar temple, also called the Adinatha temple, was built by Bhima Shah, a minister of Sultan Begada of Ahmedabad, between 1316 and 1432 AD. A massive metal statue of Rishabhanatha (Adinatha), cast in five metals, is installed in the temple. The main metal used in this statue is 'Pital' (brass), hence the name 'Pittalhar'. The name of the temple is also mentioned in an inscription dating back to 1432, found in Digambar shrine in Dilwara complex.

There are 107 images in the main shrine. The shrine consists of a Garbhagriha, Gudh mandap and Navchowki with images of yakshi Chakreshvari and yaksha Gomukha on both sides. It seems that the construction of Rangmandap and the corridor was left unfinished. The old mutilated idol was replaced and installed in 1468-69 AD weighing 108 maunds (four metric tons) according to the inscription on it. The image was cast by an artist 'Deta' which is 8 ft (2.4 m). high, 5.5 ft (1.7 m). broad and the figure is 41 inches (1,000 mm) in height. In Gudh Mandap on one side, a big marble Panch-Tirthi sculpture of Rishabhanatha is installed. Some shrines (devakulika) were constructed in 1474 and 1490, before construction was abandoned.

=== Parshvanatha Temple ===
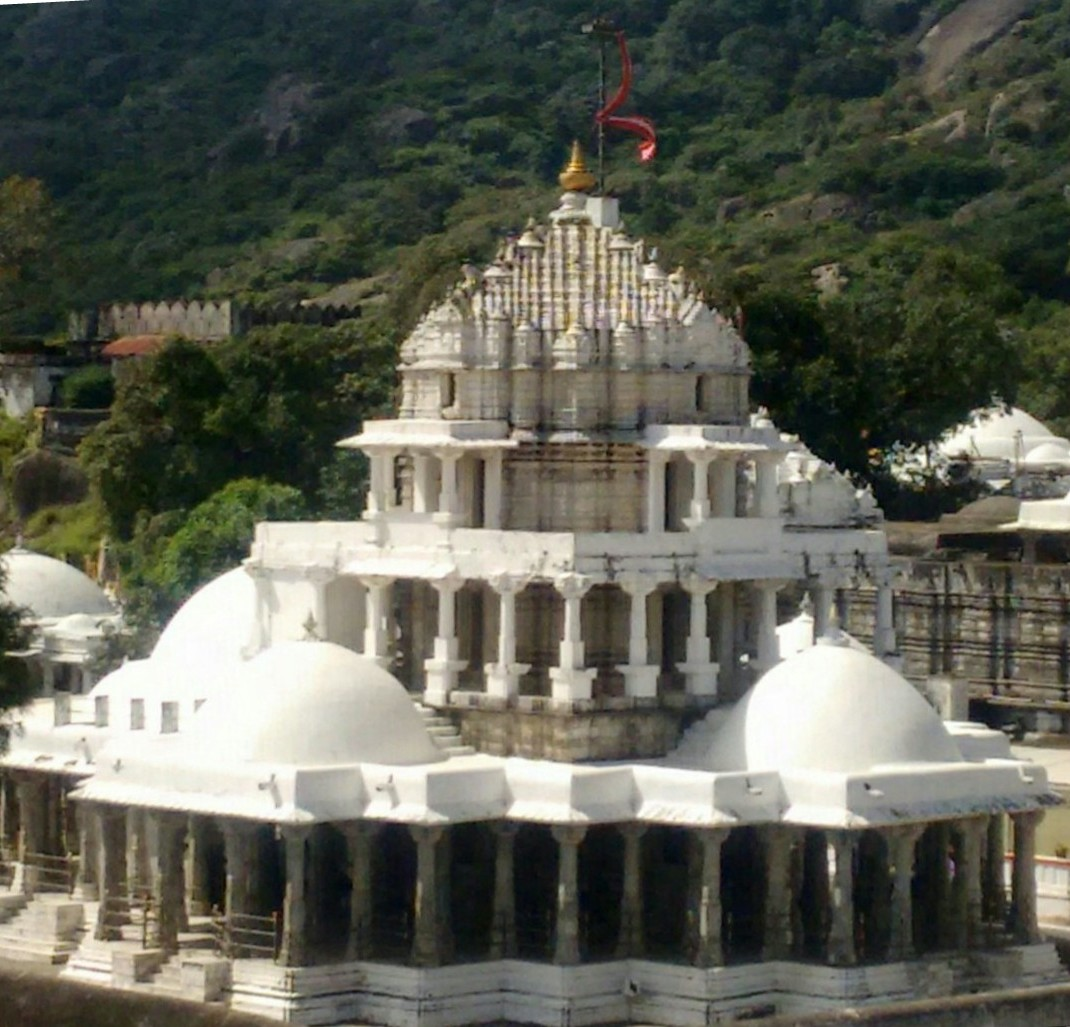
Parshvanatha Chaumukha Temple

This temple, dedicated to Parshvanatha, was built by Sangvi Mandlik and his family in 1458–59. According to popular belief, masons offered free remaining stones of Vimala Vasahi and Luna Vasahi to add marble since the temple was built of grey stone. This three-storey building is the tallest temple in Dilwara. Not all the tower remains. On all four faces of the sanctum on the ground floor are four big mandapas housing a Chaumukha idol of Parshvanatha. On the first floor, the Chaumukha idol the front iconography is of Chintamani Parshvanath, second Magalakar Parshvanatha and third Manoratha-Kalpadruma Parshvanatha all are depicted with hood of nine cobras. The image of fourth image of Parshvanatha is illegible. In the corridor there are images of 17 tirthankaras and paintings of flowers. There is depiction of 14 dreams that a mother of a tirthankara on conception. On the second floor, the Chaumukha idol is of Sumatinatha, Parshvanatha, Adinatha and Parshvanatha. The idol of goddess Ambika is also present. The Chaumukha idol of Parshvanatha is installed on the third floor.

The outer walls of the sanctum comprise ornate sculptures in gray sandstone, depicting Dikpalas, Vidhyadevis, Yakshinis, Shalabhanjikas and other decorative sculptures comparable to the ones in Khajuraho and Konark.

=== Mahaveer Swami Temple ===
This is a small structure constructed in 1582 and dedicated to Mahavira. It is small temple with carvings on its walls. On the upper walls of the porch there are pictures painted in 1764 by the artists of Sirohi. There are detailed carvings of flowers, pigeons, court-scene, dancing girls, horses, elephant, and other scenes. On each side of Mahavira, there are 3 idols of tirthankar. Outside the shrine, there is a marble slab of rectangular shape with a triangle stone over it containing 133 images of miniature-sized tirthankar with a larger image in center.

=== Renovation ===
The temples have undergone repairs from time to time. Allauddin Khilji had attacked and damaged the temples in 1311. In 1321, Bijag and Lalag of Mandore had undertaken repairs.

In 1906, Lallubhai Jaichand of Patan had the temples repaired and reconsecrated on 25 April 1906, under the supervision of Yati Hemasagar. Extensive repairs were again undertaken during 1950–1965 by Anandji Kalyanji with the work done by the Sompura firm Amritlal Mulshankar Trivedi. The older marble has a yellow patina, whereas the newer marble is white.

The temples are currently administered by the Seth Kalyanji Paramanandji Pedi. Seth Kalyanji Paramanandji Pedi also runs a Bhojanshala (dining hall) nearby.

== Amenities ==
Facilities are available for bathing, which is mandatory before puja is performed for the idols. These facilities use passive solar power to heat up the water for bathing and other things. Guided tour hours for tourists are posted outside the temple.

== Gallery ==
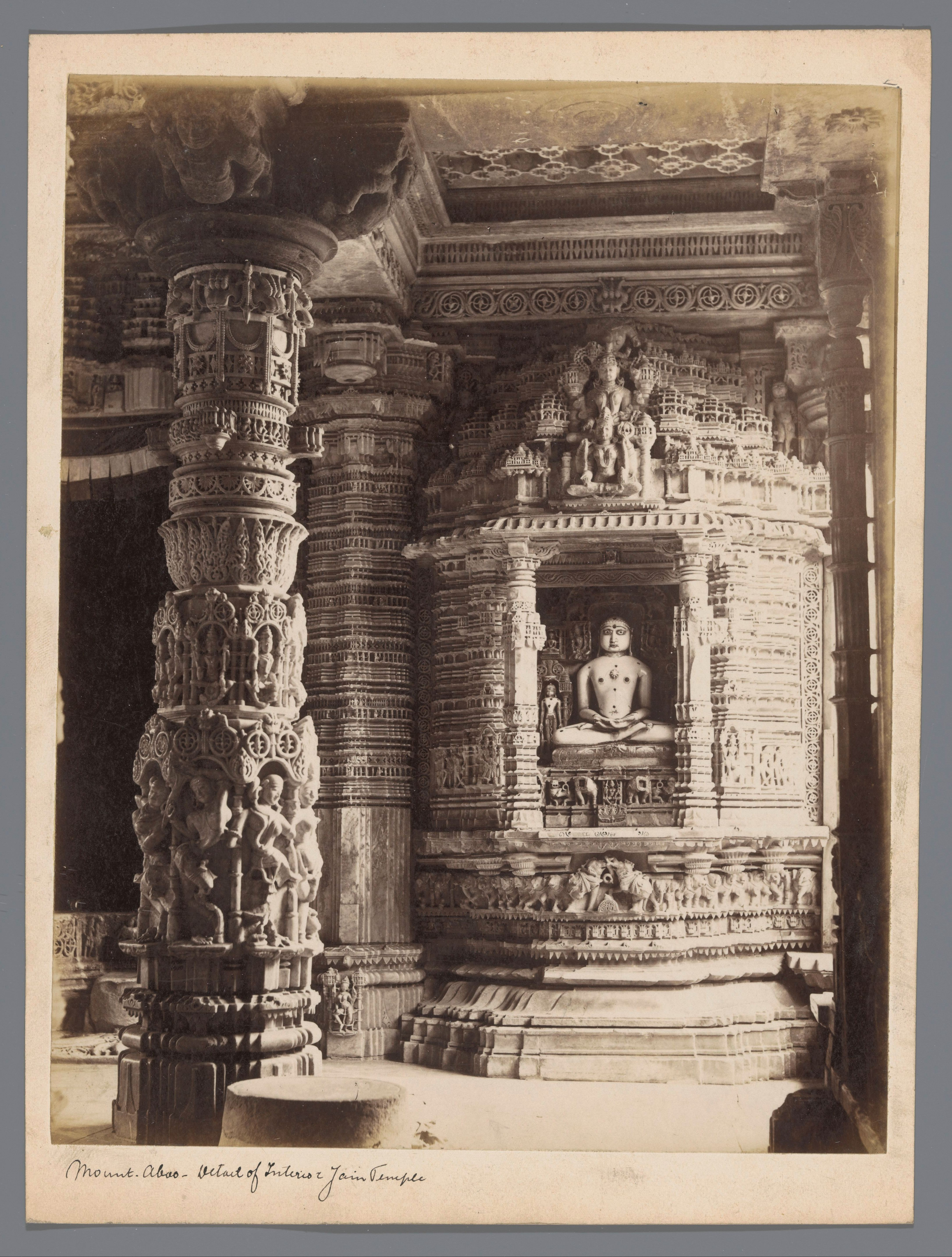
Jethani shrine in Luna Vasahi

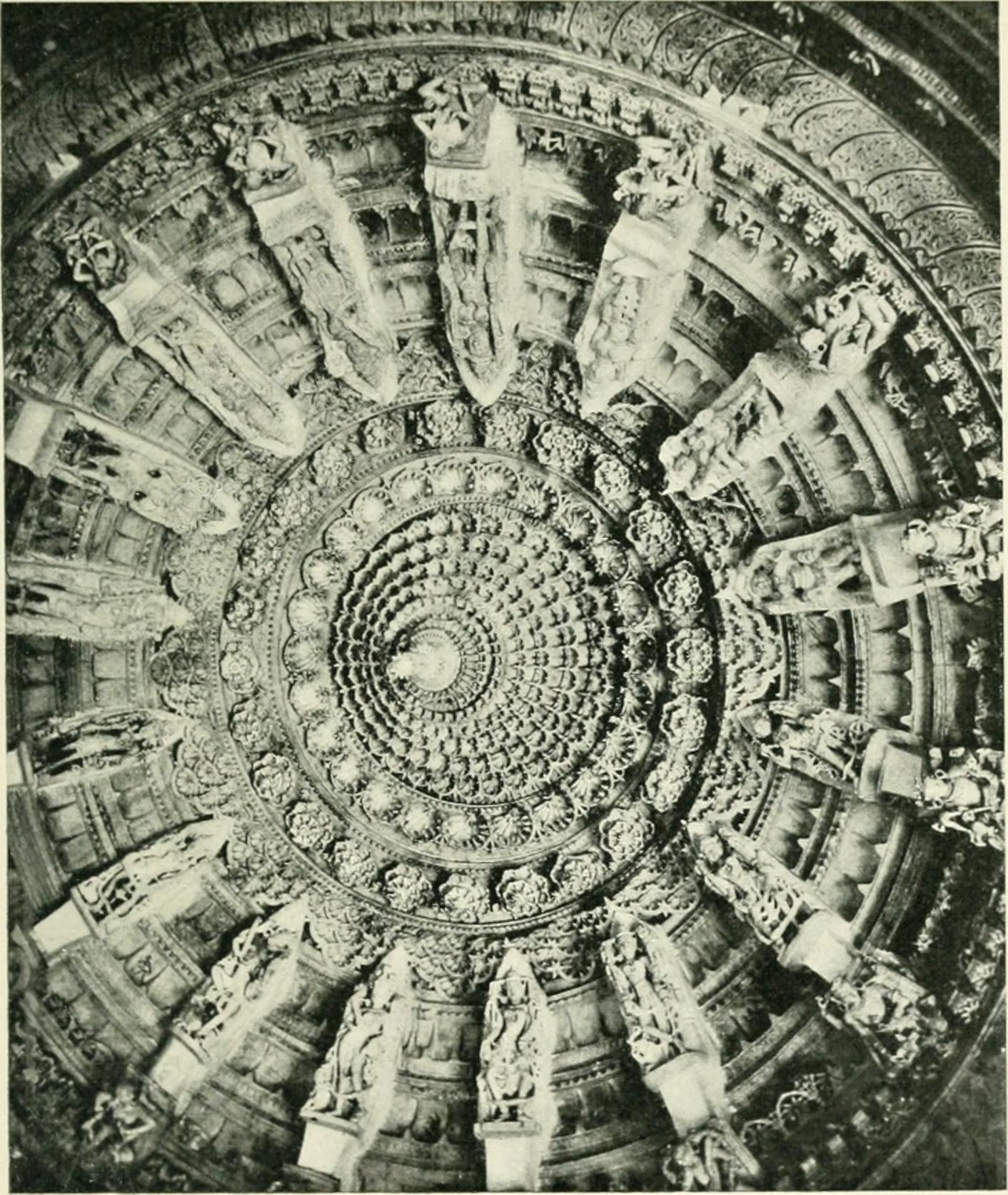
Carving of Devkulikas on ceiling of Luna Vasahi

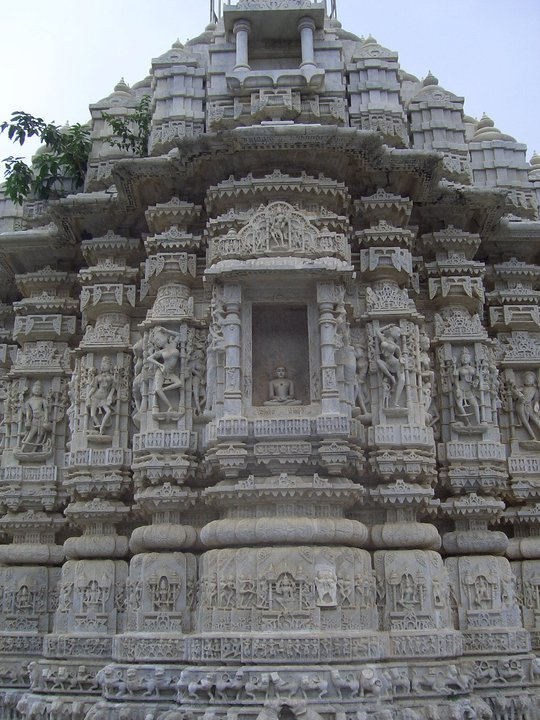
Jain Derasar, Mt.Abu

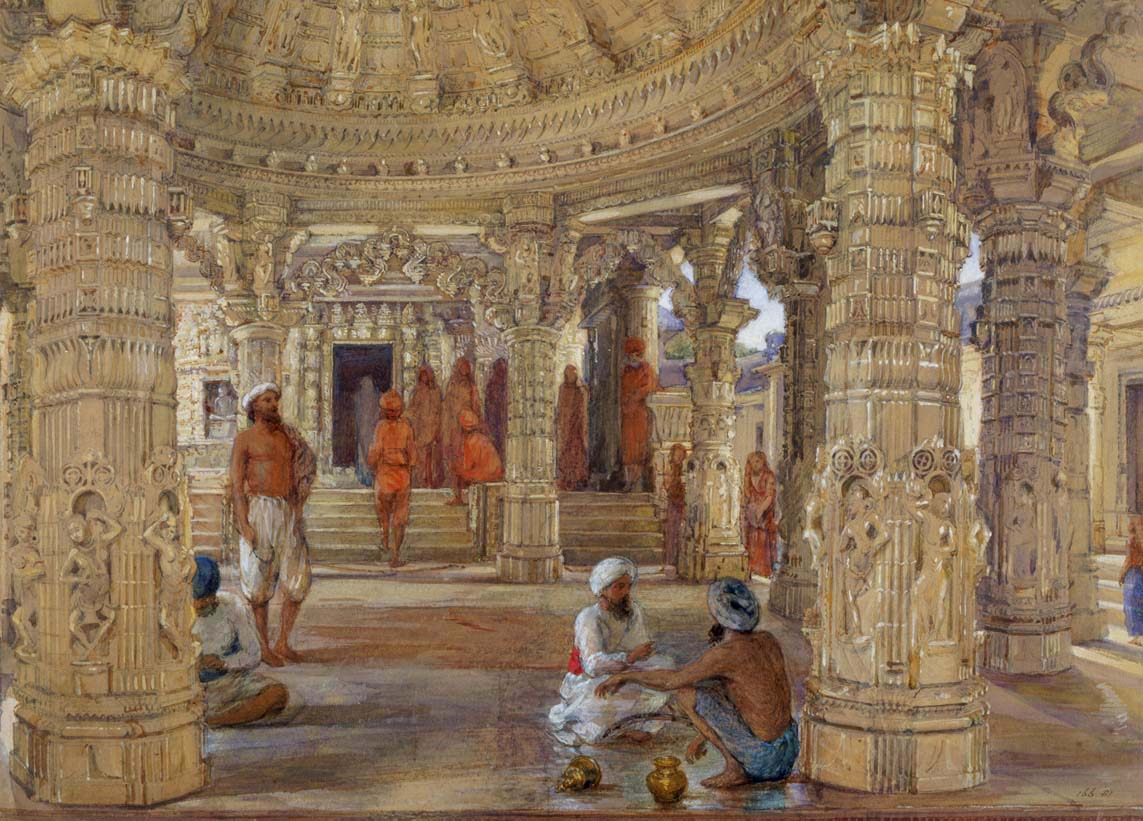
Interior of the Luna Vasahi or Shri Neminath Temple, Dilwara

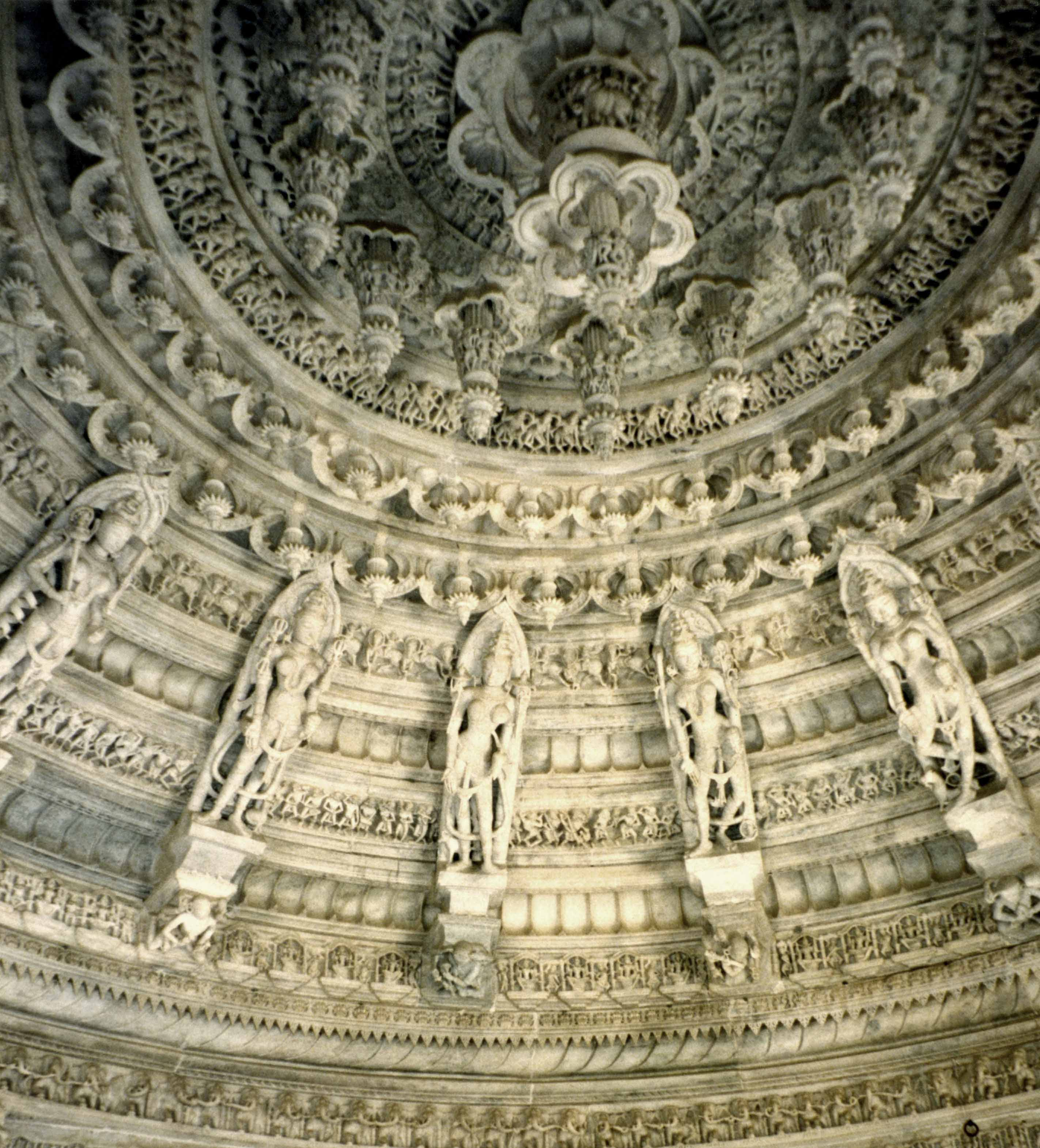
Dilwara Temple, domed ceiling, detail

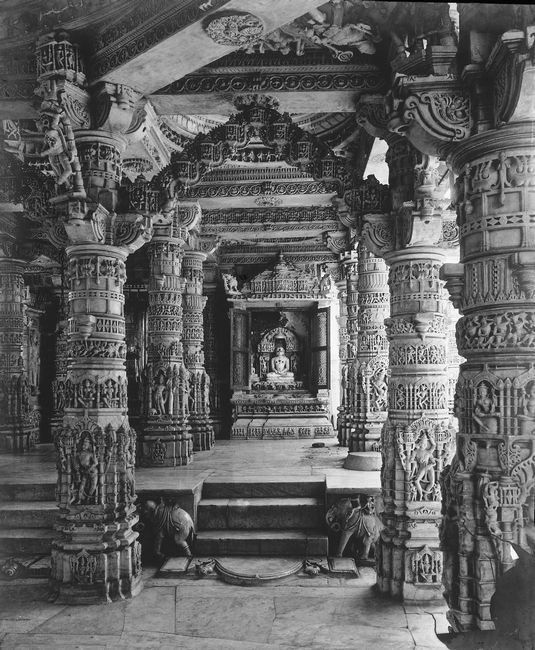
Dilwara in 1990

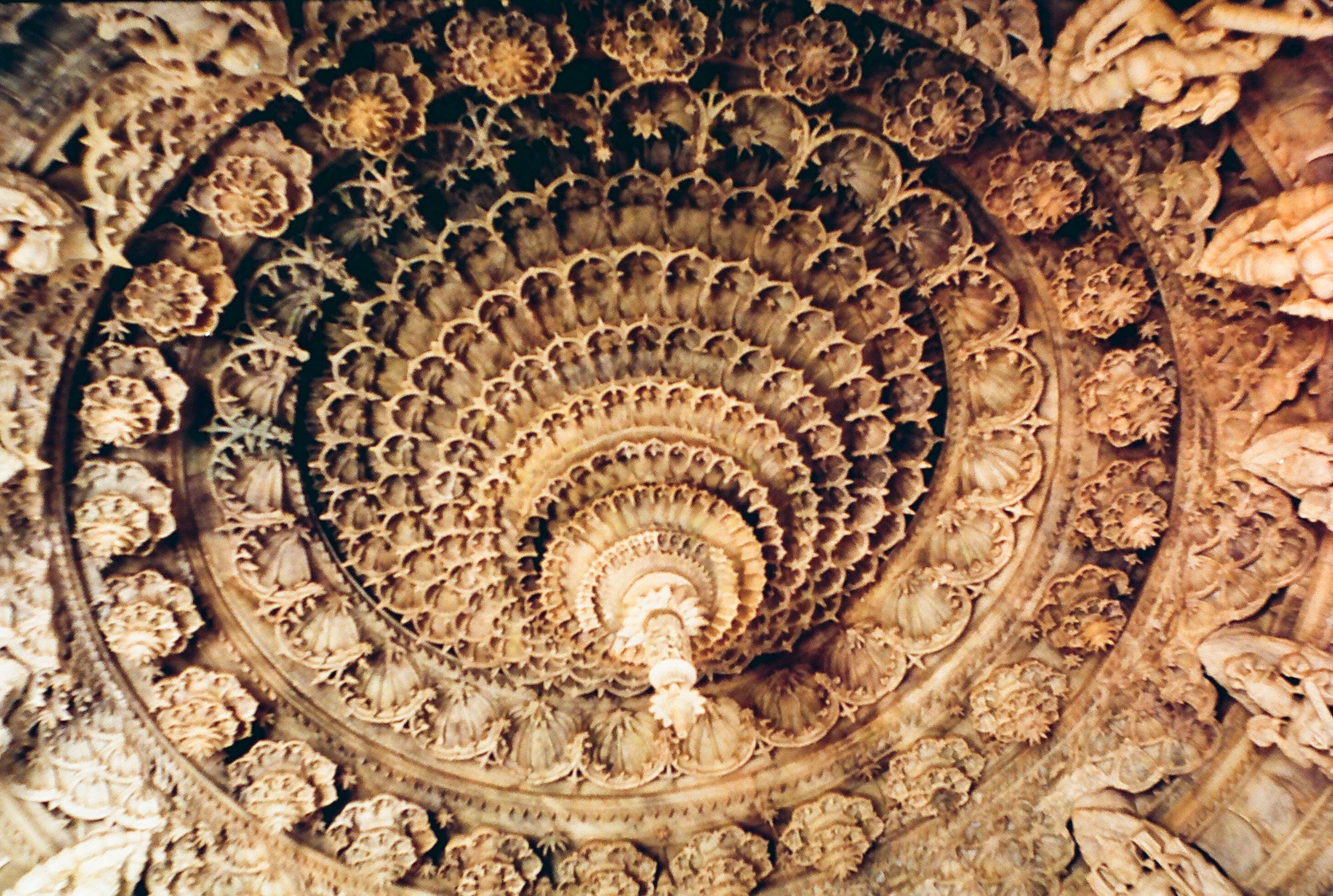
Dilwara Temple ceiling detail

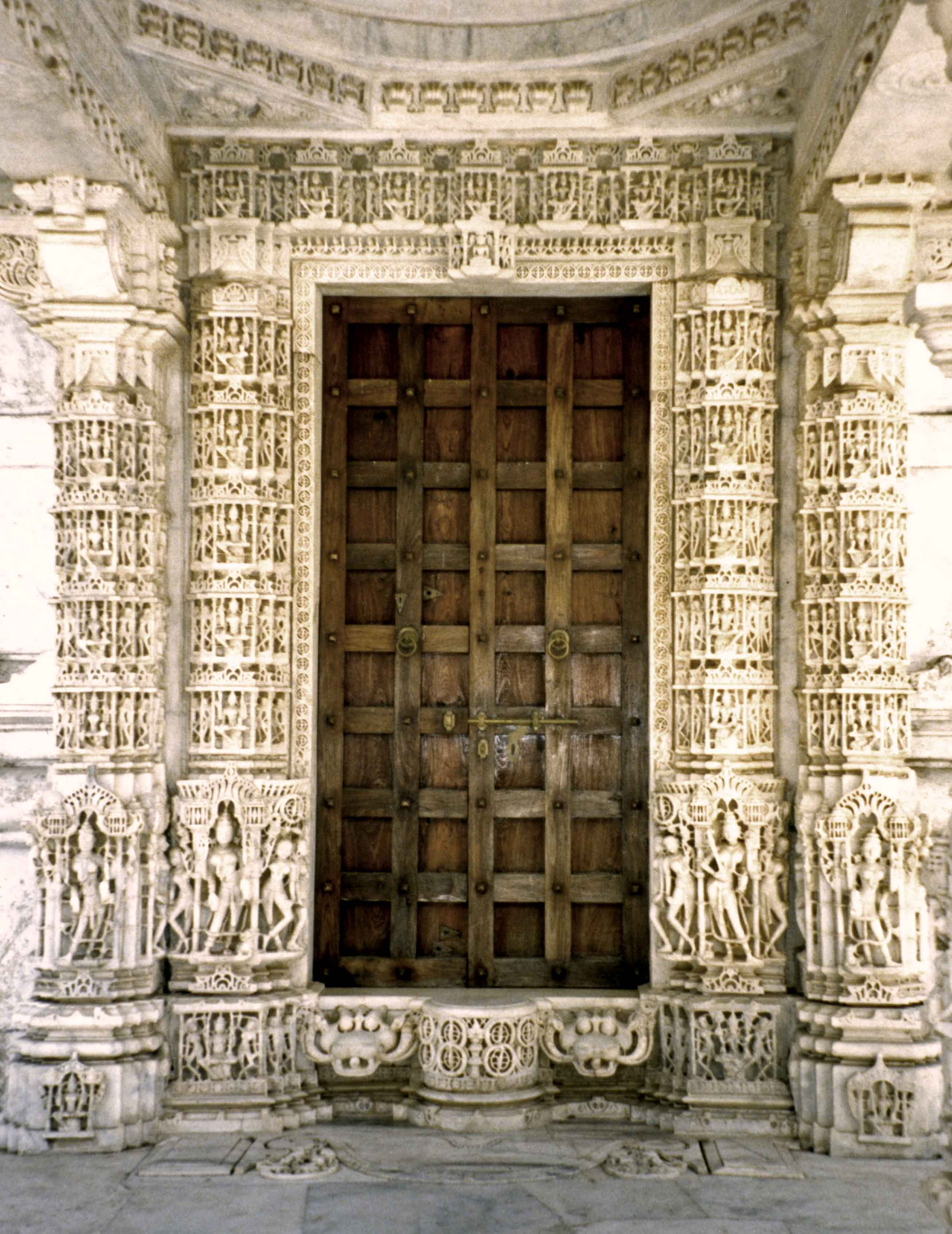
Doorway detail

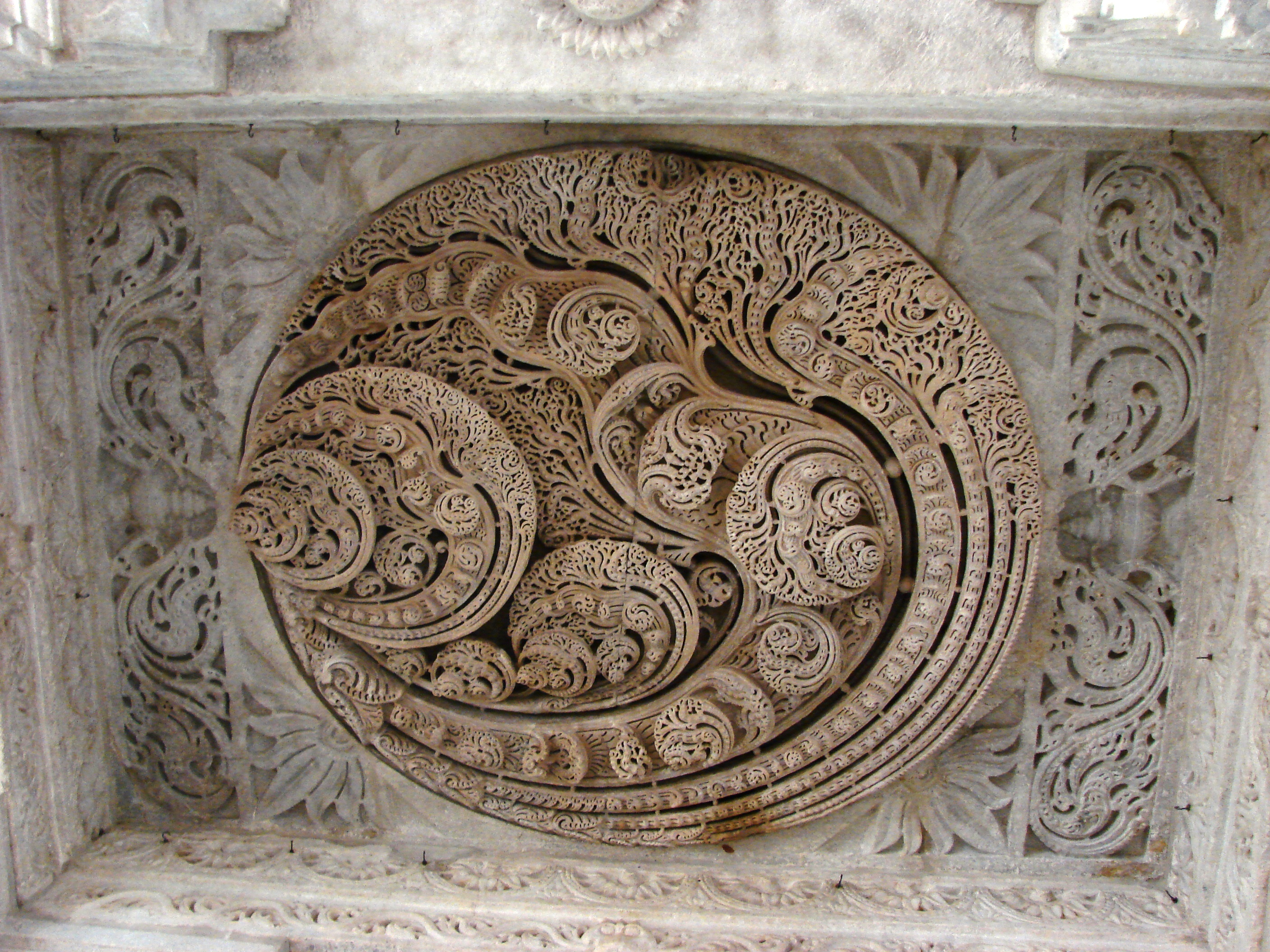
Kalpavriksha illustration in Dilwara Jain Temple

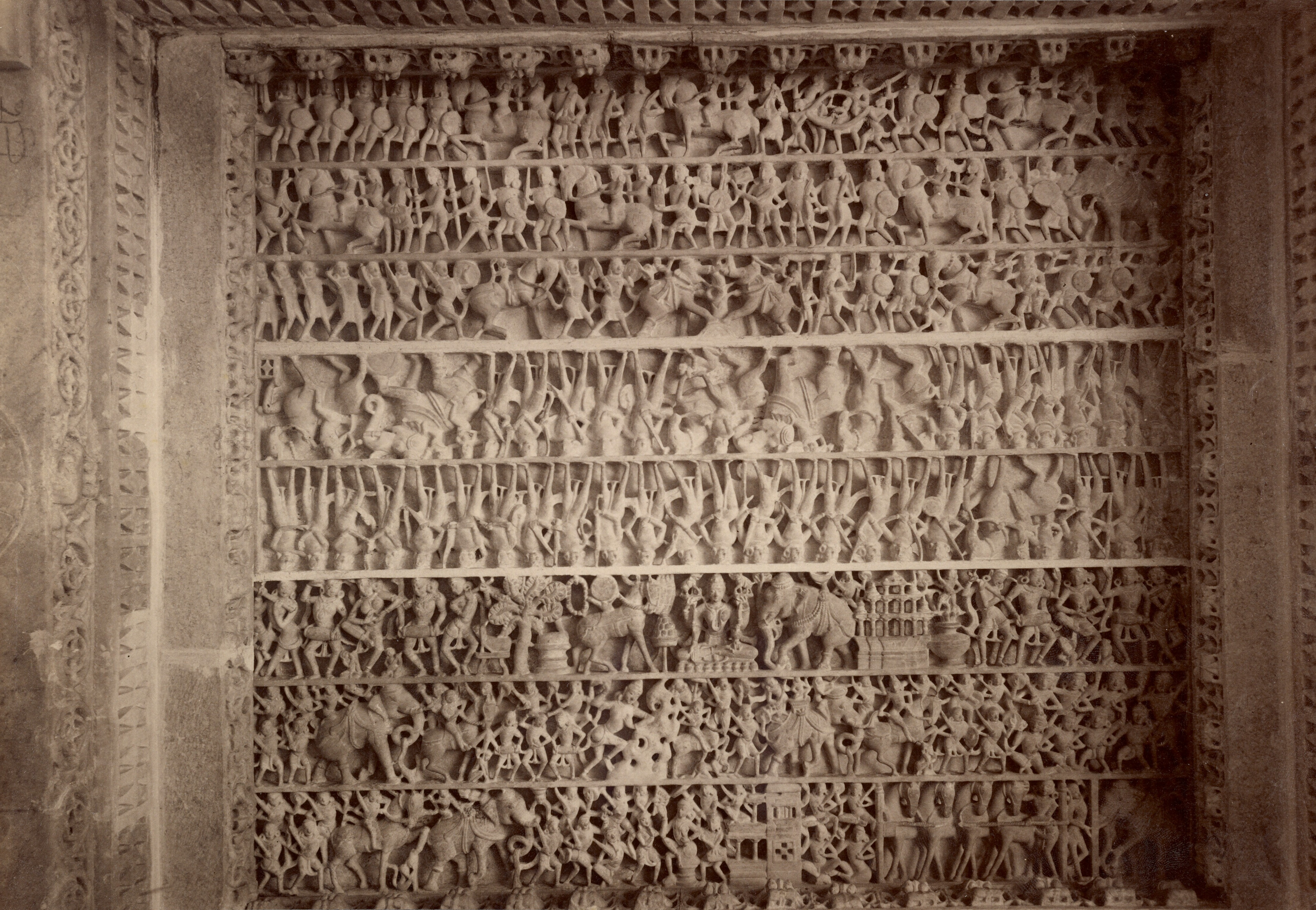
Dilwara Temple ceiling detail

== See also ==
- Ranakpur Jain Tirth
- Shankheshwar Jain Tirth
- Shikharji
- Palitana Jain Tirth
- Kumbharia Jain Tirth
