= Ambika Jain Temple, Girnar =

15th-century Jain temple in Gujarat, India

Ambika Jain Temple
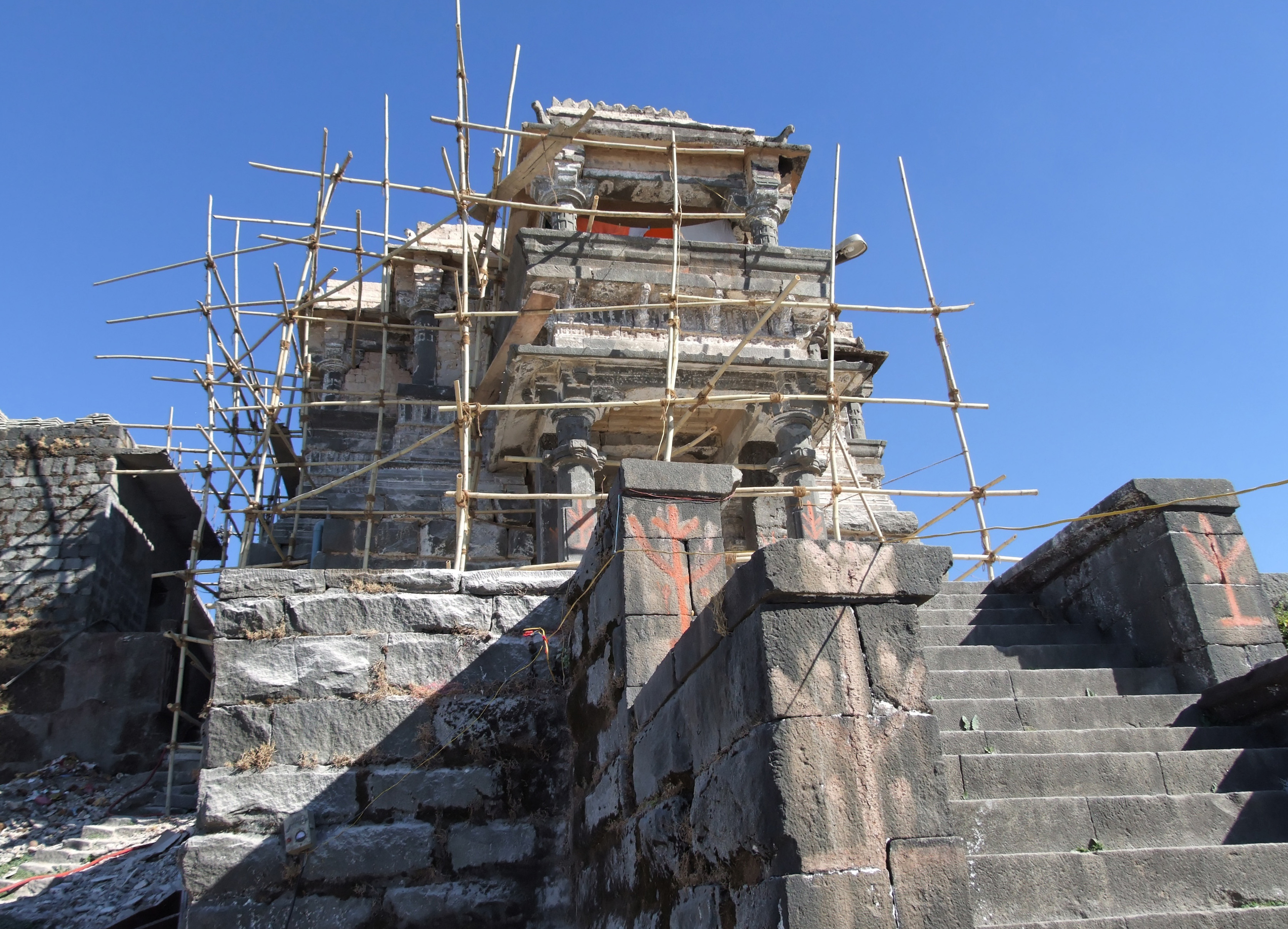
- Ambika Jain Temple in 2008

- Location in Gujarat Ambika Jain Temple, Girnar (India)

Religion
- Deity: Ambika

Location
- State: Gujarat
- Country: India
- Coordinates: 21°31′41″N 70°31′38″E

Ambika Temple, also known as Ambaji Temple, is a temple dedicated to Jain goddess Ambika on Girnar hill in Junagadh, Gujarat, India. The earliest mention of the temple is recorded in the 8th century. The present temple was built in the 15th century.

== History ==
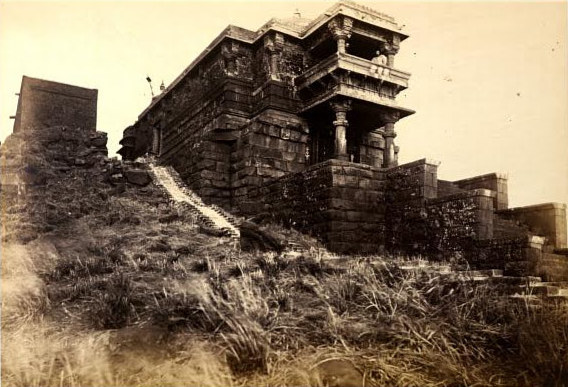
Ambika Temple in 1876

The early temple was built before 784 CE (probably in middle of the 8th century) because Digambara Acharya Jinasen's Harivamsapurana (Saka Samvat 705, 783 CE) mentions the temple. An inscription dated Vikram Samvat 1249 (1192 CE) mentions Vaghela minister Vastupala's pilgrimage to Ambika temple on Raivataka (Girnar) hill. Narendraprabhsuri mentions that Vastupala had installed idols of himself and his brother Tejapala in the temple. Jinharshasuri mentions that Vastupala and his brother Tejapala visited as well as built the large mandapa of the temple and parikara of Ambika. A praśasti eulogy given at the end in a golden lettered copy of Kalpasutra dated Vikram Samvat 1524 (1468 CE) mentions that a Shreshthi (merchant) named Samal Sah restored and renovated the Ambika temple on Girnar. As mentioned in Jain pilgrimage travelogues, the temple had Ambika as a Jain yakshika deity. The Girnar patta from Samvat 1507 in Ranakpur Jain temple also depicts Ambika in the similar manner. The temple is built according to the Jain tradition and the mandapa ceiling match with the Girnar Jain temples. According to M. A. Dhaky, the temple came under a control of the Brahminical tradition in the late medieval period. The original idol was lost during the subsequent attacks and currently a falahi is venerated in the temple.

The present temple is built around the 15th century. So the temple construction, renovation and reconstruction history extends from the mid-8th century to the 15th century.

== Architecture ==
The present temple is built in the traditional Indian temple architecture of the late 15th century.

== Pilgrimage ==
The temple is much resorted to by newly married couples. The bride and bridegroom have their clothes tied together, and attended by their male and female relations, adore the goddess and present coconuts and other offerings. This pilgrimage is supposed to procure for the couple along continuance of wedded bliss.

The temple is visited by Hindu as well as Jain pilgrims.

== See also ==
- Girnar ropeway
- Ambika (Jainism)
