= Ambika (Jainism) =

Jain goddess

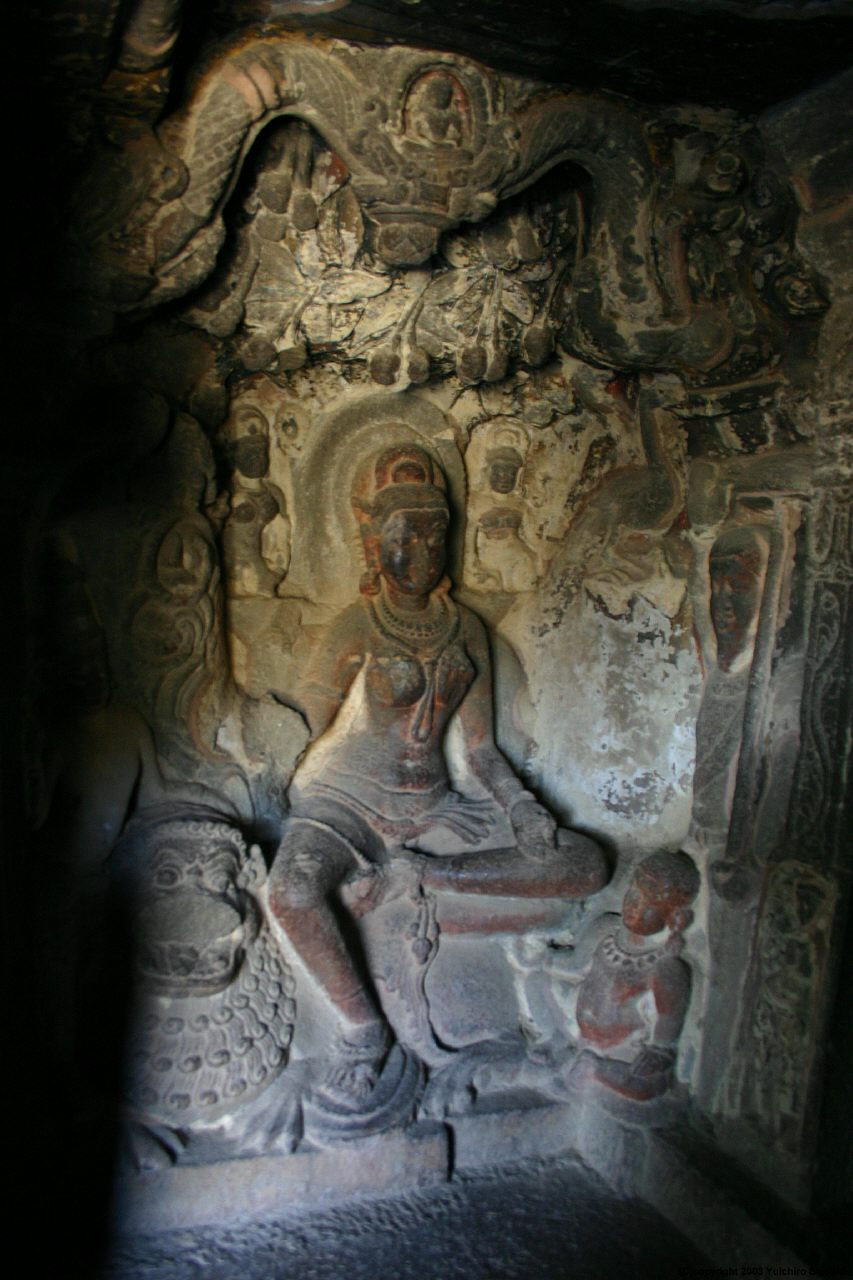
- An image of Ambika in Cave 34 of the Ellora Caves

Genealogy
- Spouse: Sarvanha (Dig.); Gomedha (Śvēt.)

In Jainism, Ambika (Sanskrit: अम्बिका, Odia: ଅମ୍ବିକା Ambikā "Mother") or Ambika Devi (अम्बिका देवी Ambikā Devī "the Goddess-Mother") is the yakshini "dedicated attendant deity" or Śāsana Devī "protector goddess" of the 22nd Tirthankara, Neminatha. She is also known as Ambai, Amba, Kushmandini and Amra Kushmandini. She is often shown with one or more children and often under a tree. She is frequently represented as a pair (Yaksha Sarvanubhuti on the right and Kushmandini on the left) with a small Tirthankar image on the top. The name is also a common epithet of the Hindu goddess Parvati.

== Etymology ==
The name Ambika is a Sanskrit word, that translates to mother.

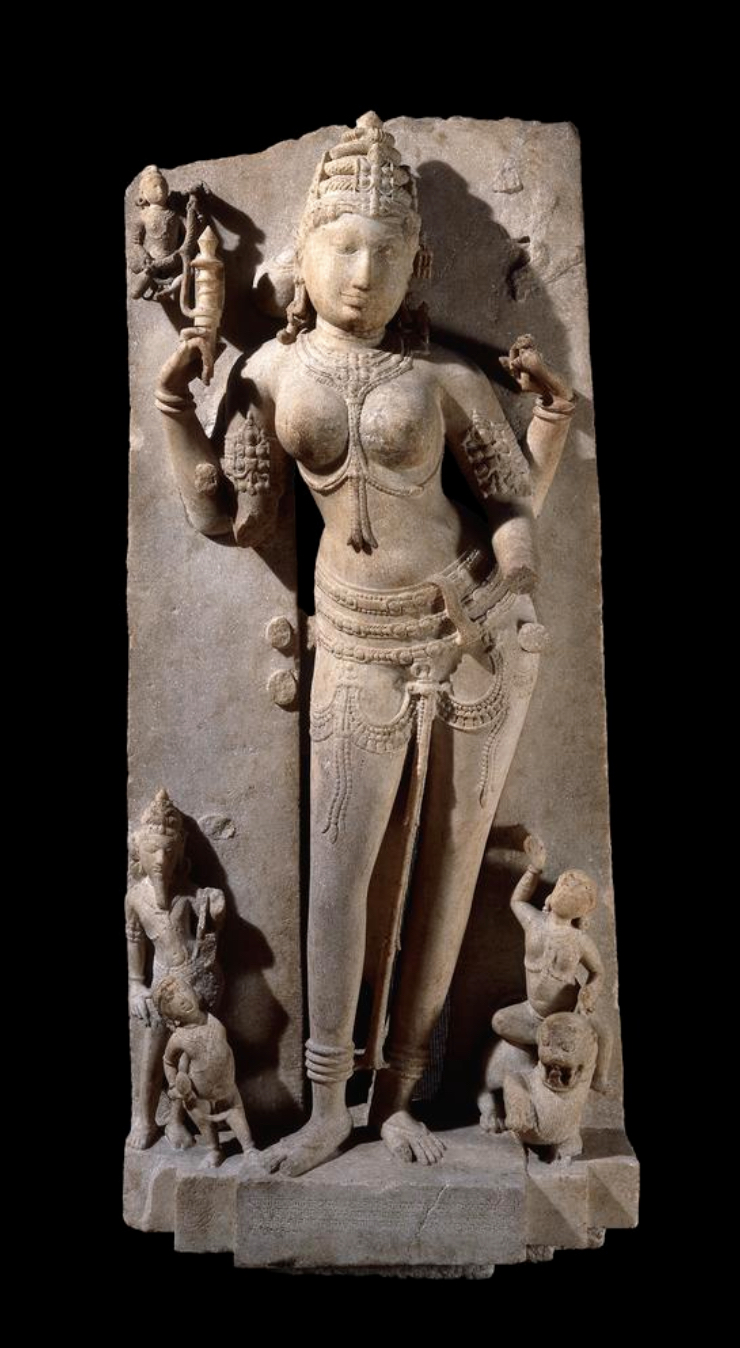
Ambika Statue from Dhar

== Legend ==
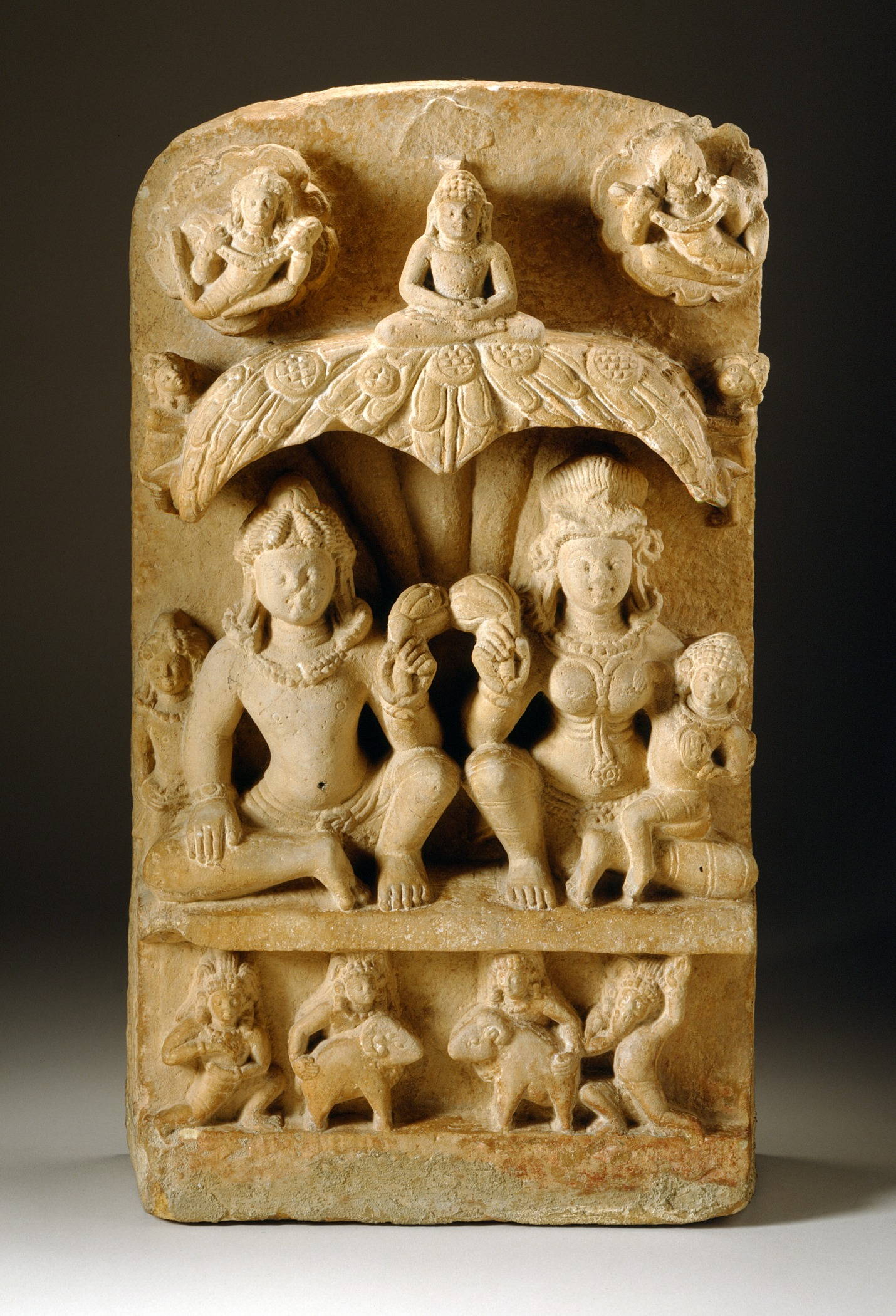
Ambika with Sarvana, LACMA, 6th century

According to Jain texts, Ambika is said to have been an ordinary woman named Agnila who became a Goddess. She lived in the city of Girinagar with her husband, Soma and her two children, Siddha and Buddha as per the Śvetāmbara tradition, or with her husband Somasarman and her two children, Shubhanakar and Prabhankara as per the Digambara tradition.

One day, Soma invited Brahmins to perform Śrāddha (funeral ceremony) and left Agnila at home. Varadatta, the chief disciple of Neminatha, was passing by and asked for food from Agnila to end his month-long fast. Soma and Brahmins were furious at her as they considered the food to be impure now. Soma drove her out of the house along with her children; she went up a hill.

She was blessed with power for her virtue, the tree she sat down under became a Kalpavriksha, wish-granting tree, and dry water tank started overflowing with water. Demi-gods were angry at the treatment meted out to Angila and decided to drown the entire village, but her house. After seeing this Soma and the Brahmins felt this was because of her saintliness and begged her for forgiveness. Upon seeing her husband approach her, afraid of punishment, a scared Angila committed suicide by jumping off the cliff, but she was instantly reborn as Goddess Ambika. Her husband was reborn as a lion and he came to her, licked her feet and became her vehicle. Neminatha initiated her two sons and Ambika became Neminatha's yakshi.

== Legacy ==
Ambika is the yakshi of Neminatha with Sarvahna (according to Digambara tradition) or Gomedha (according to Śvētāmbara tradition) as yaksha.

=== Worship ===
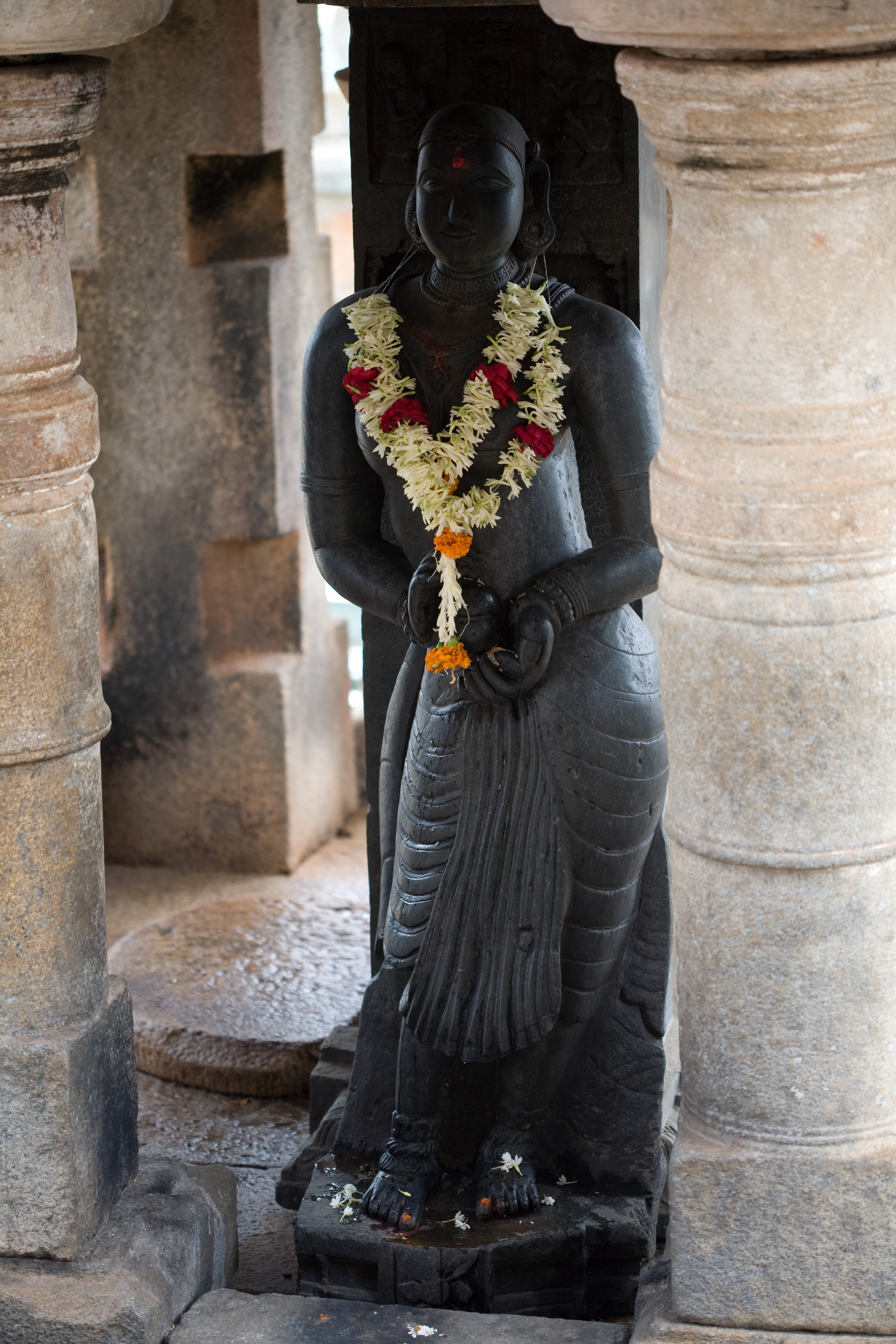
Ambika as Gullikayi ji in front of Gommateshwara statue

A number of images and temples of Ambika are found in India. Goddess Ambika along with Padmavati and Chakreshvari is held as an esteemed deity and along with Tirthankaras, is worshipped by Jains. Ambika and Padmavati are associated with tantric rituals. These tantric rites involves yantra-vidhi, pitha-sthapana and mantra-puja. Ambika is also called Kalpalata and kamana devi a goddess that fulfils. At Vimal Vasahi, Ambika is carved kalpalata, a wish fulfilling creeper. Ambika is also associated with childbirth and prosperity. Ambika is also worshiped as Kuladevi or gotra-devi. Ambika is the kula-devi of the Porwad(Pragvat) Jain community. While she is worshipped by all Śvetāmbara Murtipujaka Jains, she is specially revered by the Porwads.

According to a Digambara legend, after completing construction of Gommateshwara statue, Chavundaraya organised a mahamastakabhisheka with five liquids, milk, tender coconut, sugar, nectar and water collected in hundreds of pots but liquid could not flow below the navel of the statue. Kushmandini appeared disguised as a poor old woman holding milk in the shell of half of a white Gullikayi fruit and the abhisheka was done from head to toe. Chavundaraya realised his mistake and did abhishek without pride and arrogance and this time abhisheka was done from head to toe. Worship of Kushmandini devi or Ambika is an integral part of Jain rituals in Shravanabelagola.

=== In literature ===
- Ambika-Kalpa, Ambika-Tadamka, Ambikatatanka, Ambika-stuti, Ambika-devi-stuti and Bhairava-Padmavati-Kalpa are tantric text to worship Ambika.
- Ambika-stavana, is hymn to Ambika, compiled by Vastupala, minister of Chalukyas, in the 13th century.
- Ambika-devi-kalpa of Acharya Jinprabha suri, 14th century.
- Aparajita-prccha is hymn to Ambika, compiled by Bhuvanadeva, 12th-13th century.

=== Iconography ===
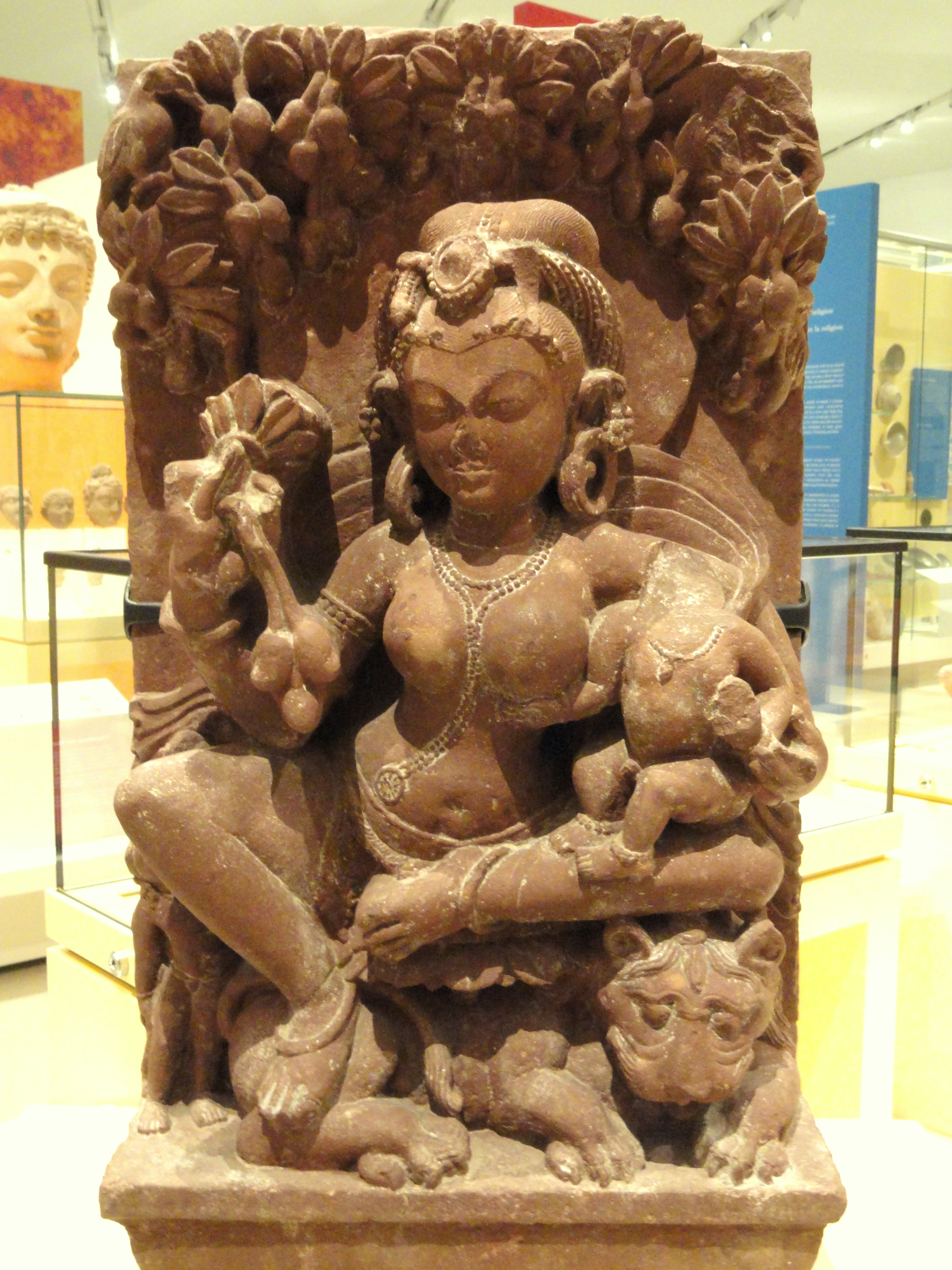
Goddess Ambika sitting on lion and mango tree branch in right arm and her son in left, Royal Ontario Museum, 8th-9th century

According to the tradition, her colour is golden and her vehicle is a lion. She has four arms. In her two right hands, she carries a mango and in the other a branch of a mango tree. In one of her left hands, she carries a rein and in the other she has her two sons, Priyankara and Shubhankara. In South India Ambika is shown to have dark blue complexion. Ambika is depicted as sashandevi for other tirthankars as well. Ambika is often represent with Bahubali. Yaksha-Yakshi pair sculptures of Ambika and Sarvahanabhuti are one of the most favoured along with Gomukha-Chakreshwari and Dharanendra-Padmavati.

Ambika has been popular an independent deity as well. It is speculated that the origin of Ambika is attributed to elements of three different deities - first, goddess riding on the lion from Durga; Second, some goddess associated with mangoes and mango trees; Third, Kushmanda.

The Amba-Ambika group of caves of Manmodi Caves, dated 2nd century CE, has carving of Goddess Ambika. The oldest sculpture of Ambika is an idol from Akota Bronzes dated 550—600 CE. A sculpture of Ambika was discovered at Karajagi village in Haveri taluk. The sculpture has a two-line Sanskrit inscription in Nagari script about the date of its installation - "Ambikadevi, Shaka 1173, Virodhikrit. Samvatsara, Vaishakha Shuddha 5, Guruvara". This corresponds to Thursday, 27 April 1251 AD.

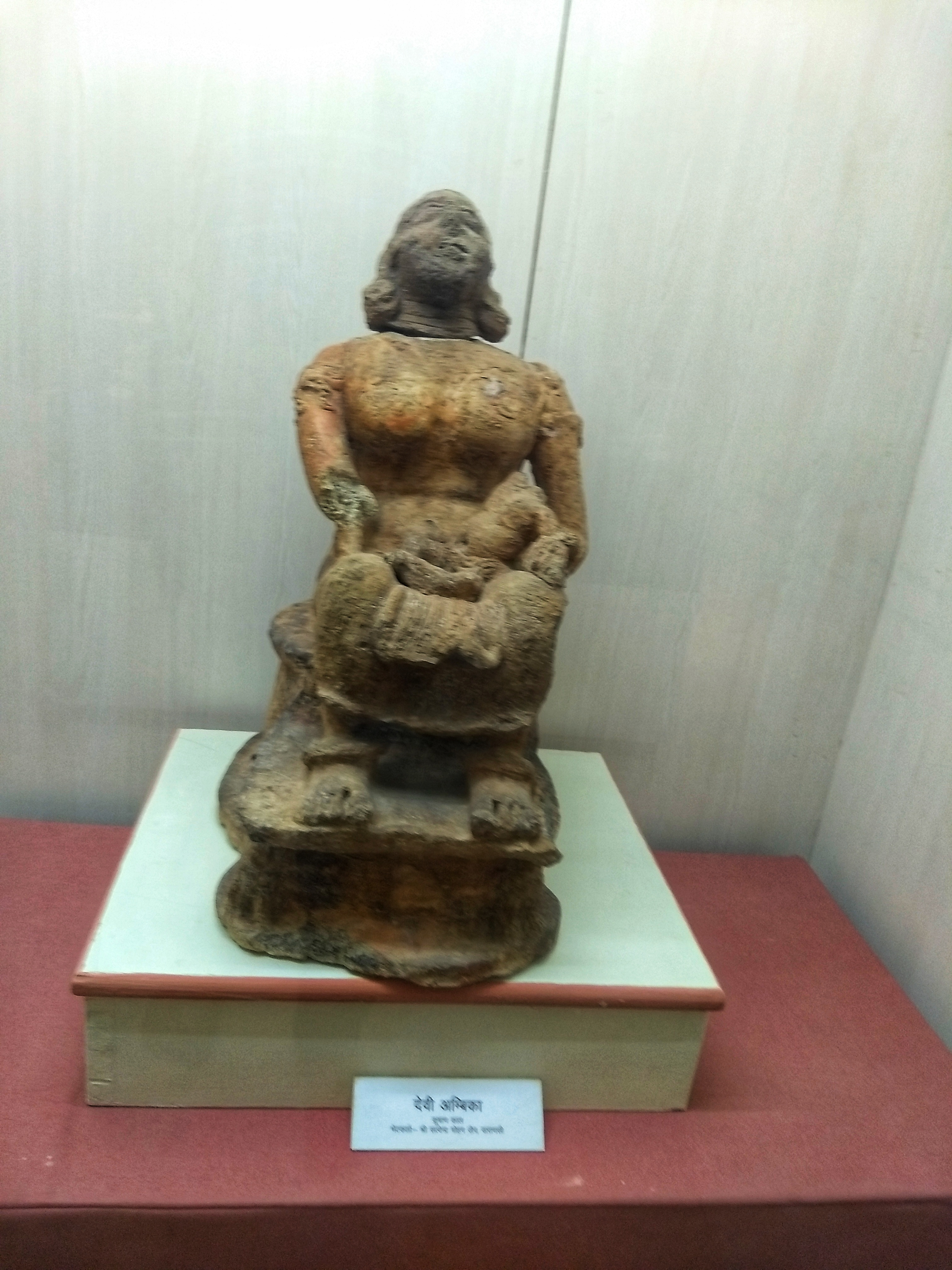
Ambika sculpture from Kushan Empire

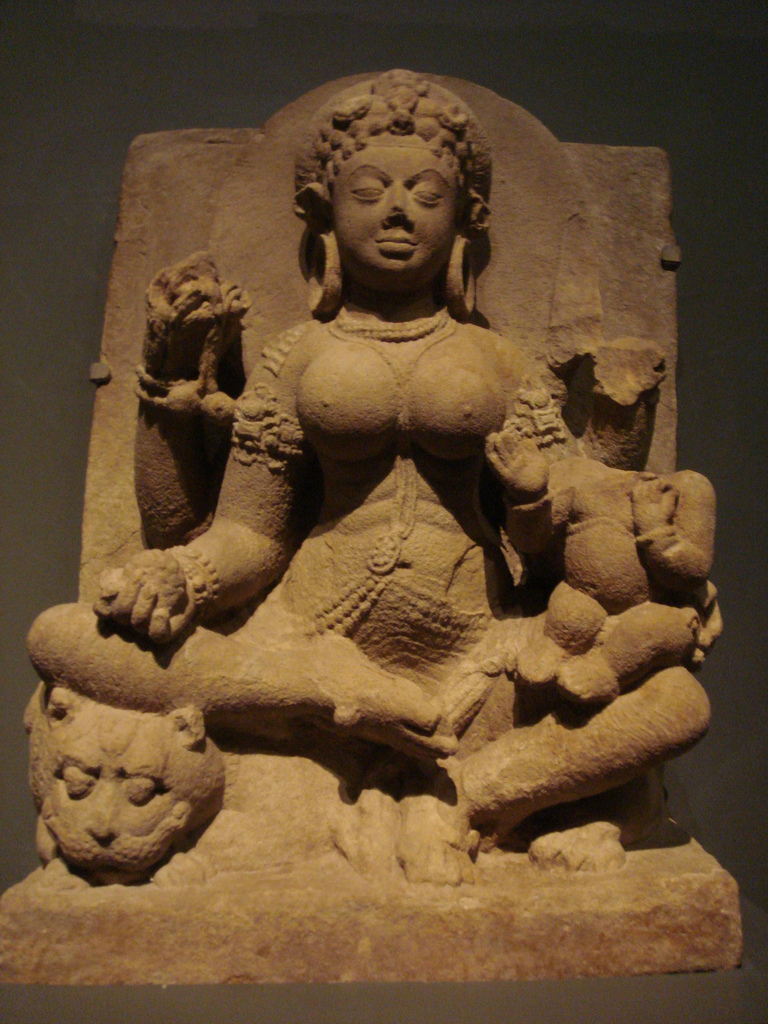
Image depicting Goddess Ambika in LACMA, 6th-7th century

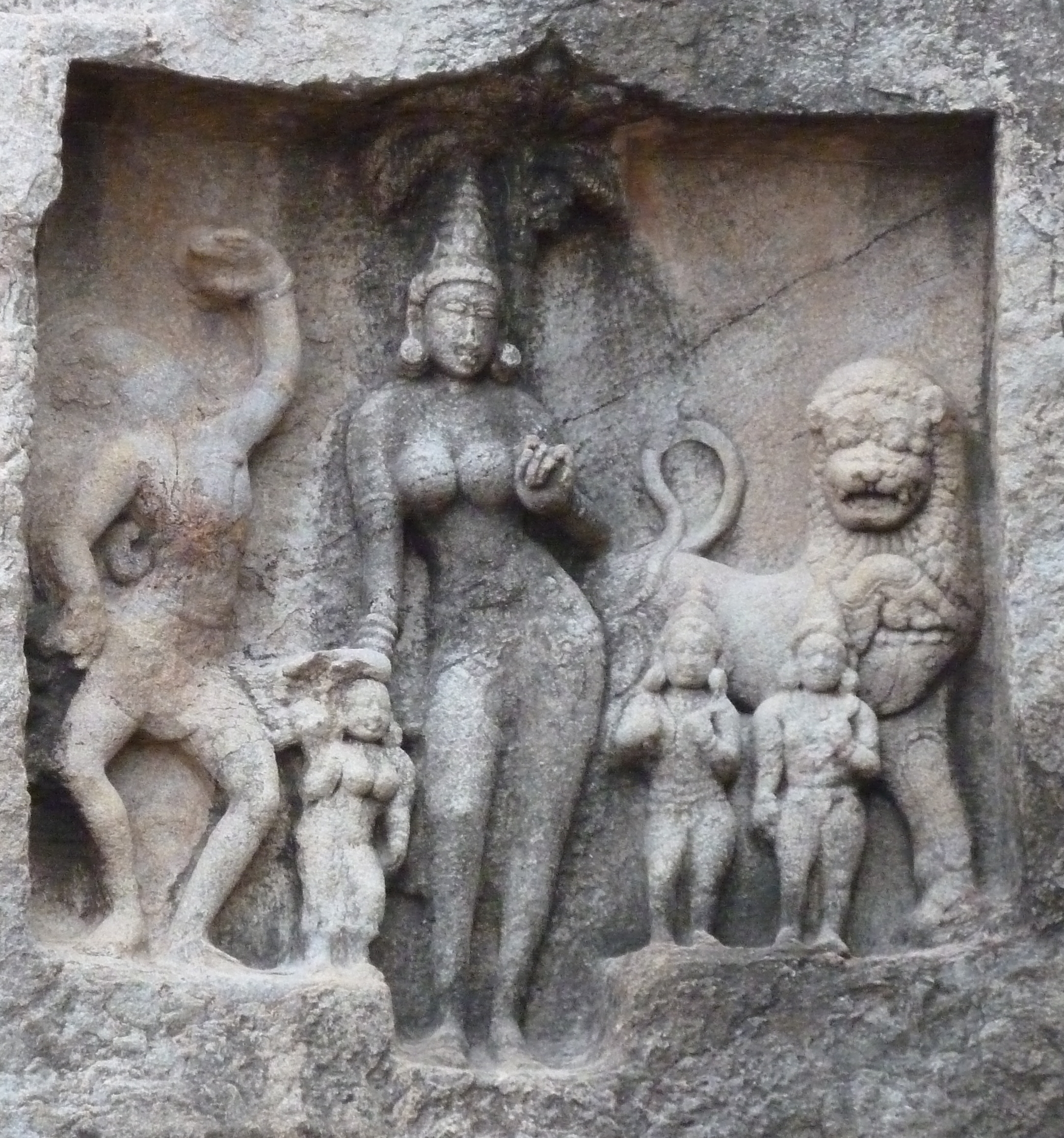
Carving of Ambikadevi Kalugumalai Jain Beds, 8th century

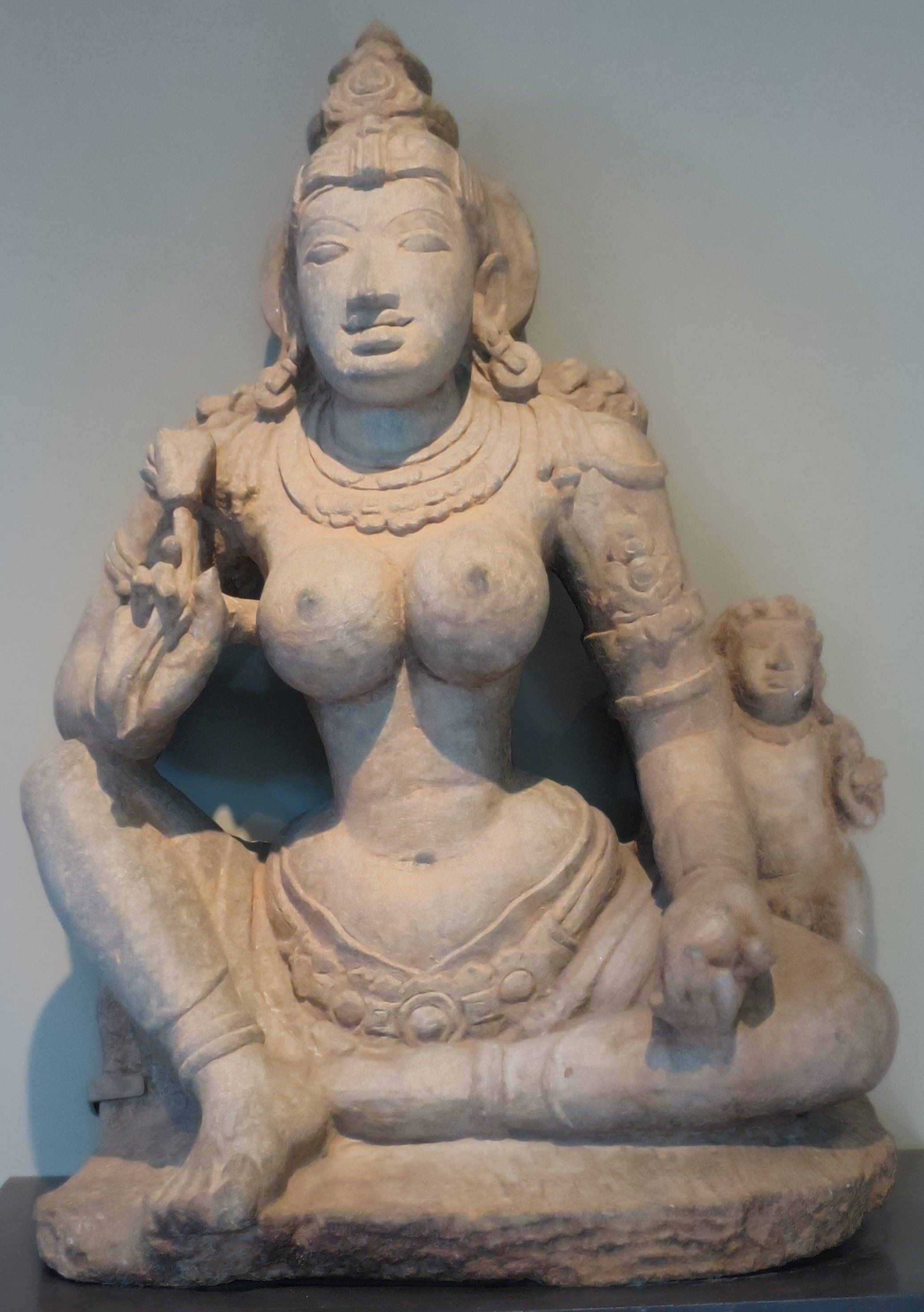
Image depicting Goddess Ambika from Karnataka, India, c. 900 CE, Norton Simon Museum

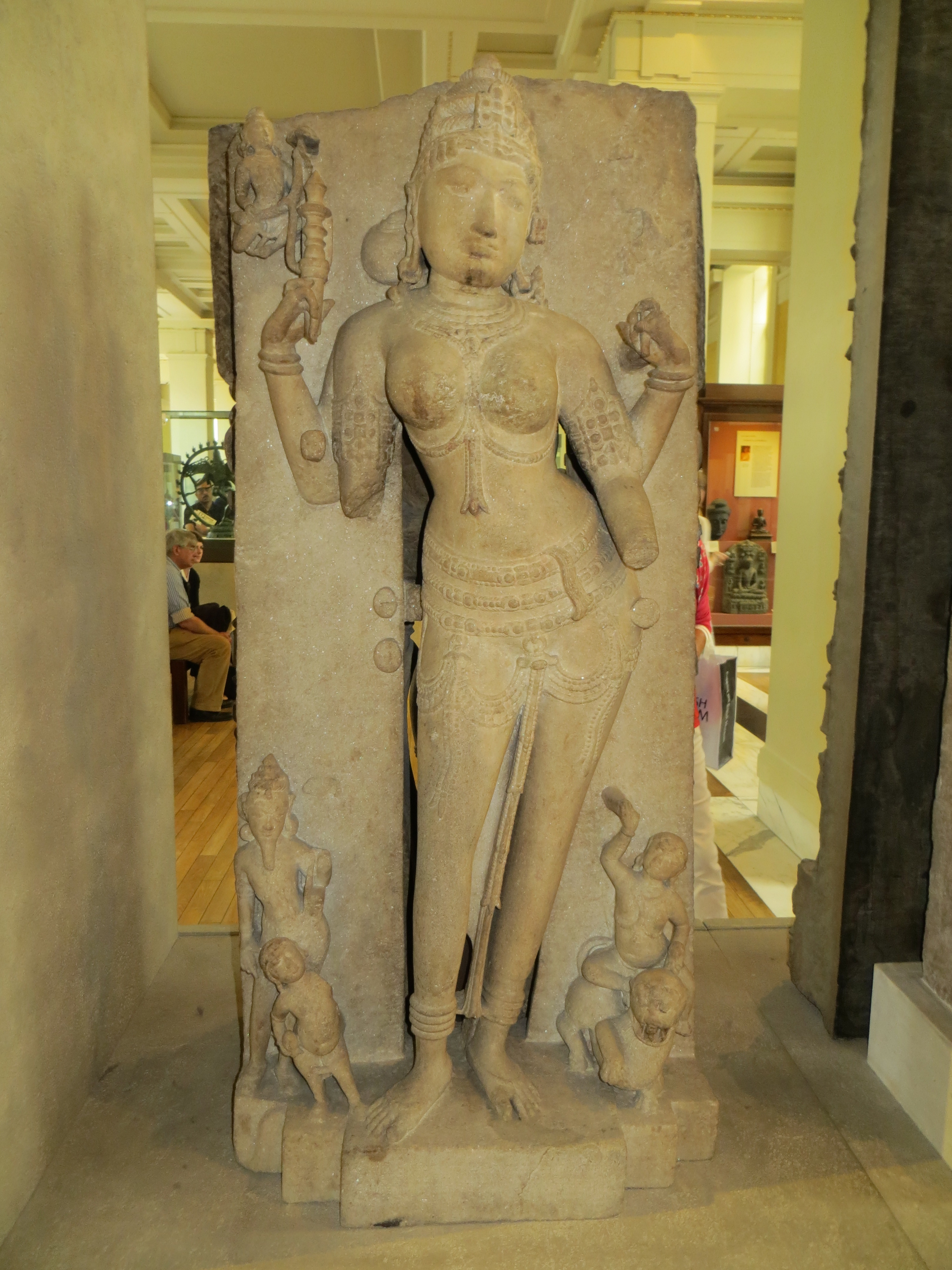
Sculpture of Goddess Ambika, 1034 AD, British Museum

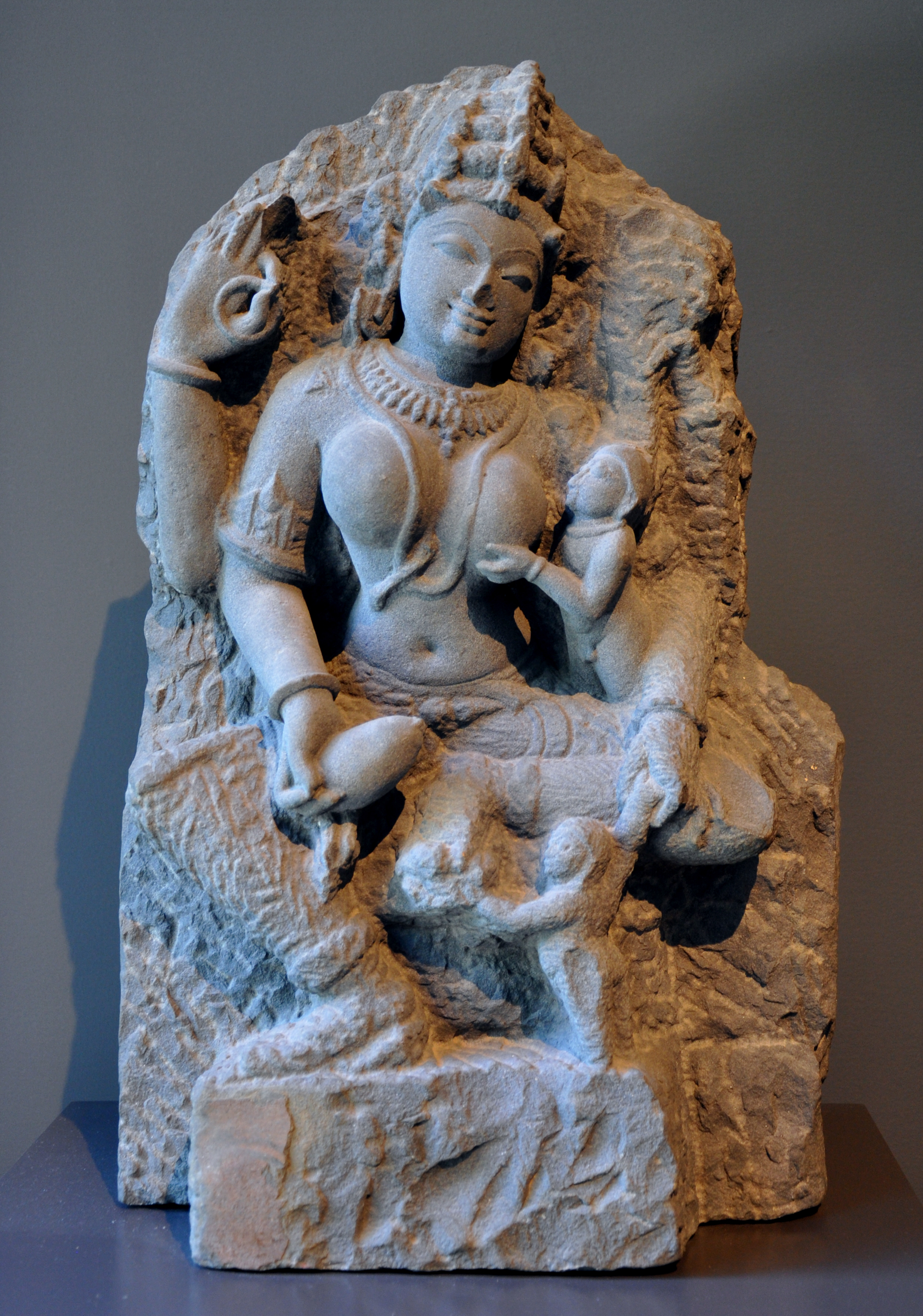
Goddess Ambika in Museum Rietberg, 11th century

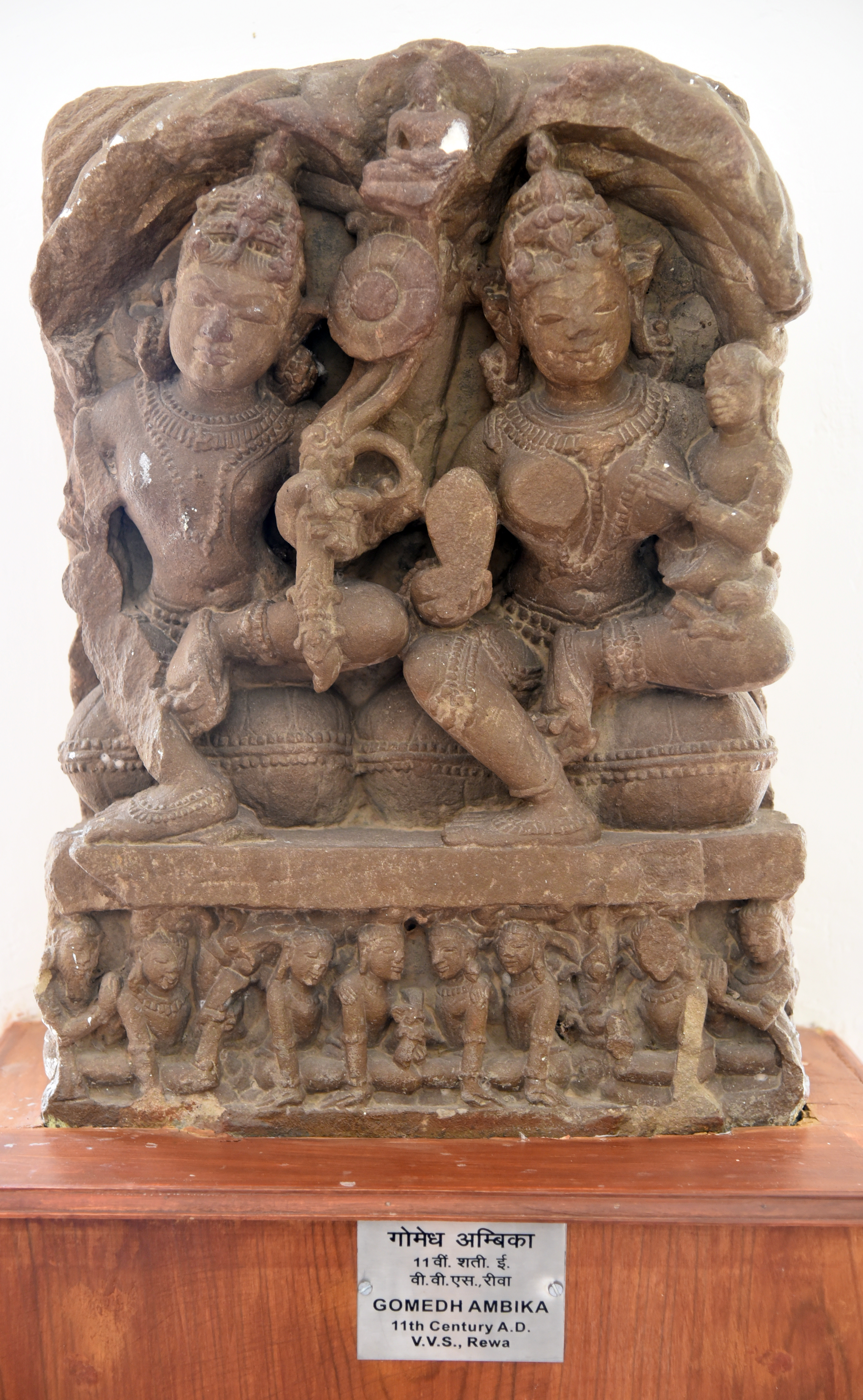
Sculpture of Gomedh and Ambika at Maharaja Chhatrasal Museum, 11th century

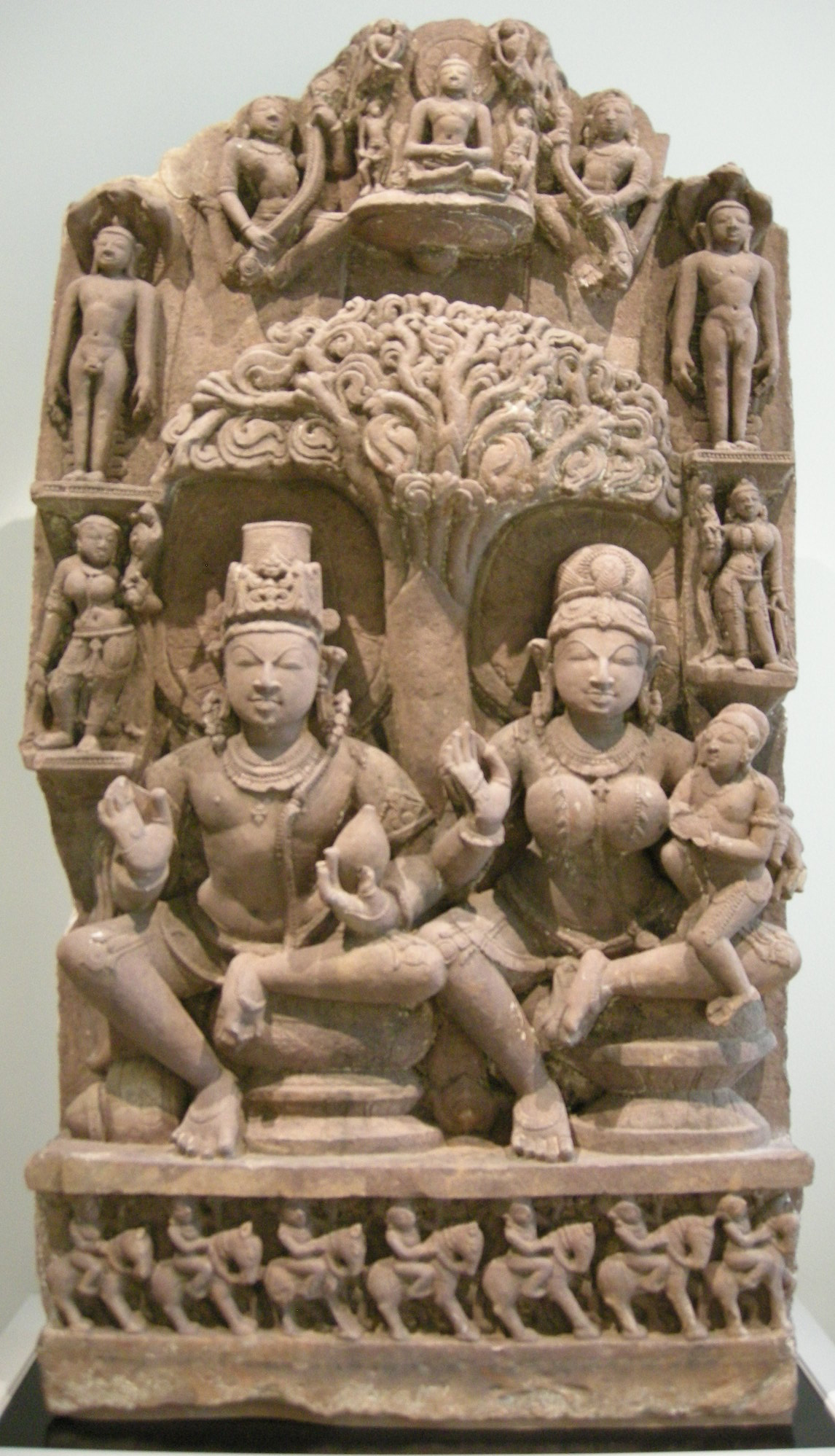
Sarvanubhuti and Kushmandini with Jinas, 11 century, Art Gallery of New South Wales

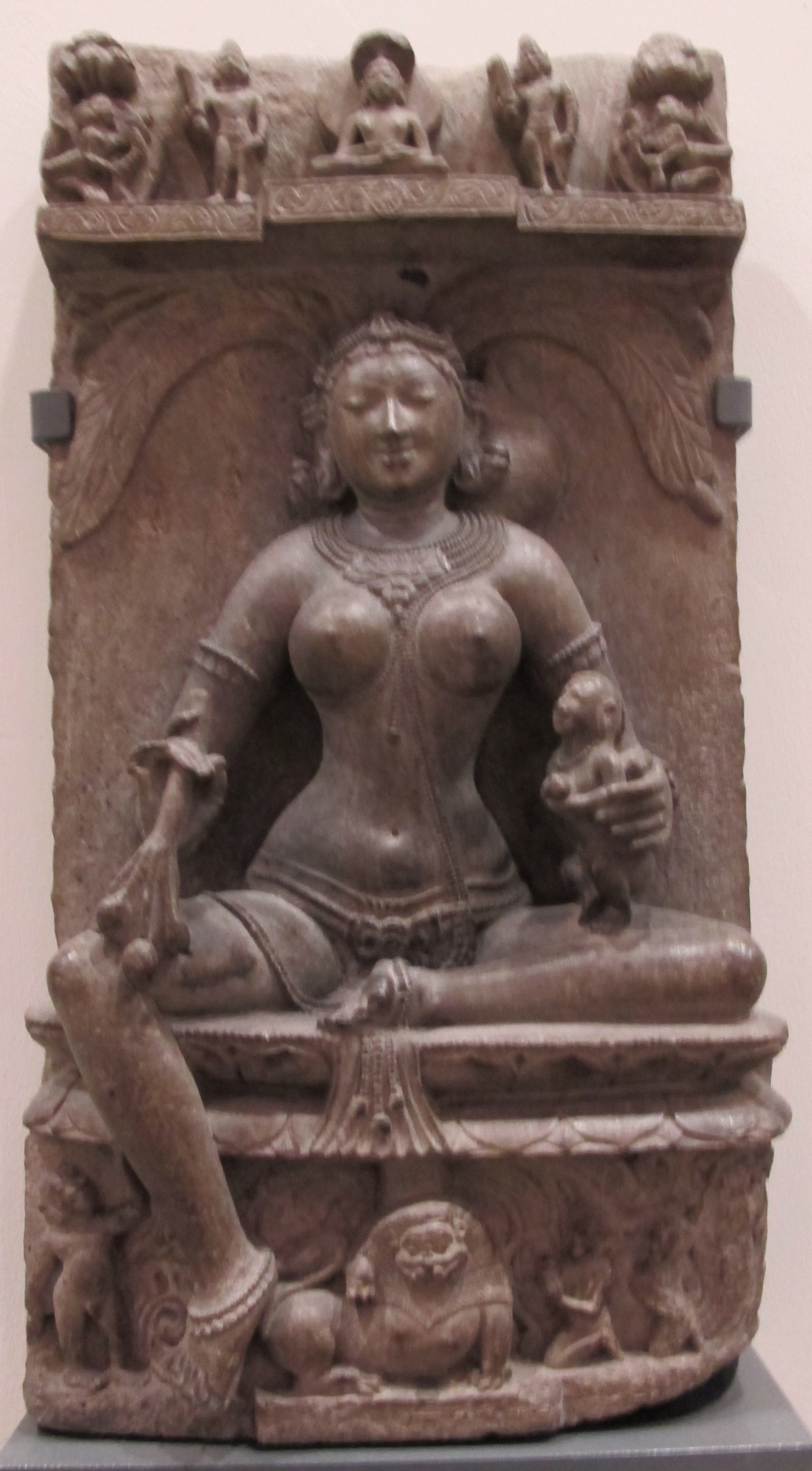
Goddess Ambika idol, Victoria and Albert Museum, 1150-1200 AD

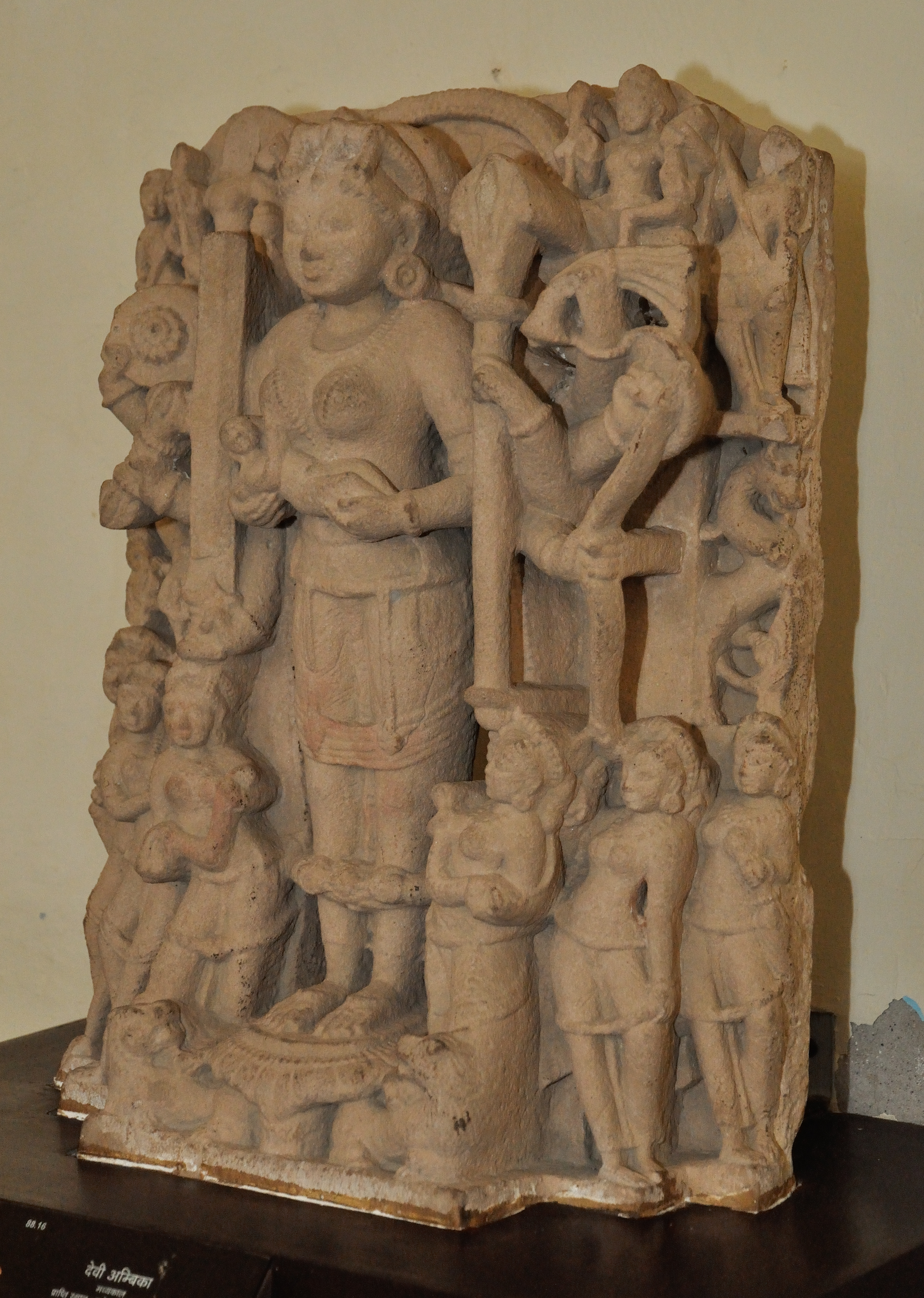
Goddess Ambika - Medieval Period (Government Museum, Mathura)

=== Main temples ===
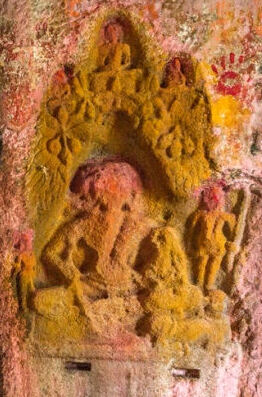
Goddess Ambika at Manmodi Caves

The Amba-Ambika group of caves of Manmodi Caves, dated 2nd century CE, is dedicated to Goddess Ambika. The Ambika Temple, Girnar dates back 784 CE and is considered one of the oldest temple dedicated to Goddess Ambika. The worship of Goddess Ambika, the tutelary deity of Shri Munisuvrata-Nemi-Parshva Jinalaya, Santhu is popular among devotees.

The major temples of Shri Ambika Devi include:

- Ambikadevi temple at Kodinar, Saurashtra in the state of Gujarat is an important pilgrimage center built in pre-medieval period.
- Shri Kuladevi Ambikadevi Jain Temple, Takhatgarh in Pali district of Rajasthan state.
- Shri Kuladevi Ambikadevi Jain Temple, Padarli, Rajasthan.
- Shri Ambika Temple, Girnar
- Jain Matha, Shravanabelgola

== See also ==
- Padmavati
- Chakreshvari
- Neminatha
