= Chakreshvari =

Guardian goddess of Rishabhanata in Jainism

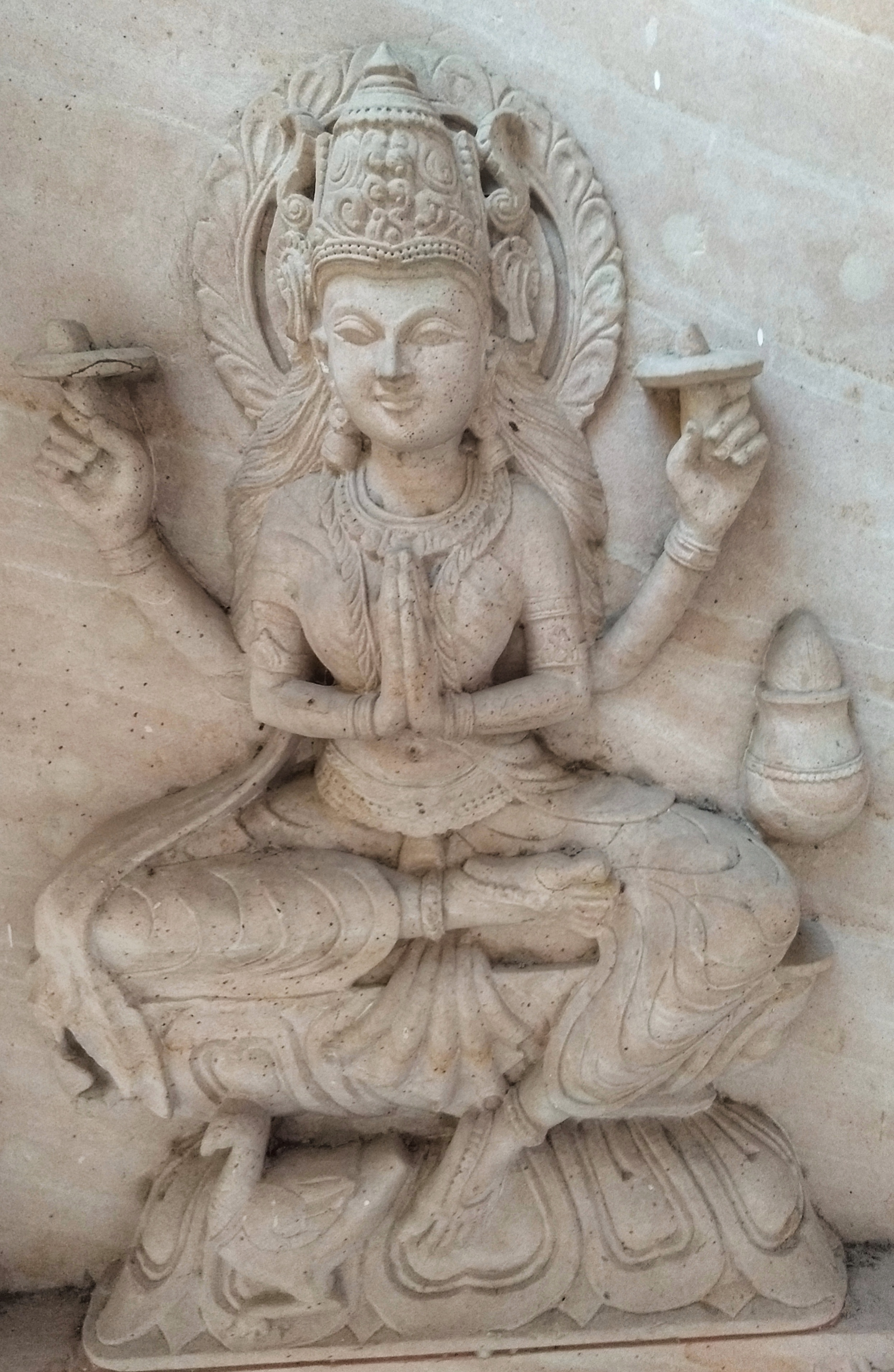
- Chakreshvari image at Trilok Teerth Dham

Genealogy
- Spouse: Gomukha

In Jain cosmology, Chakreshvari or Apraticakra is the guardian goddess or Yakshini (attendant deity) of Rishabhanatha. She is the tutelary deity of the Sarawagi Jain community. Along with Ambika, and Padmāvatī, Chakreshvari is one of the three yakshi that attract the most devotional worship among the Jains. Chakreshvari is also known by the name Apraticakra. She is associated with the chakra (discus), from which her name is derived, and is generally represented riding Garuda.

== Iconography ==
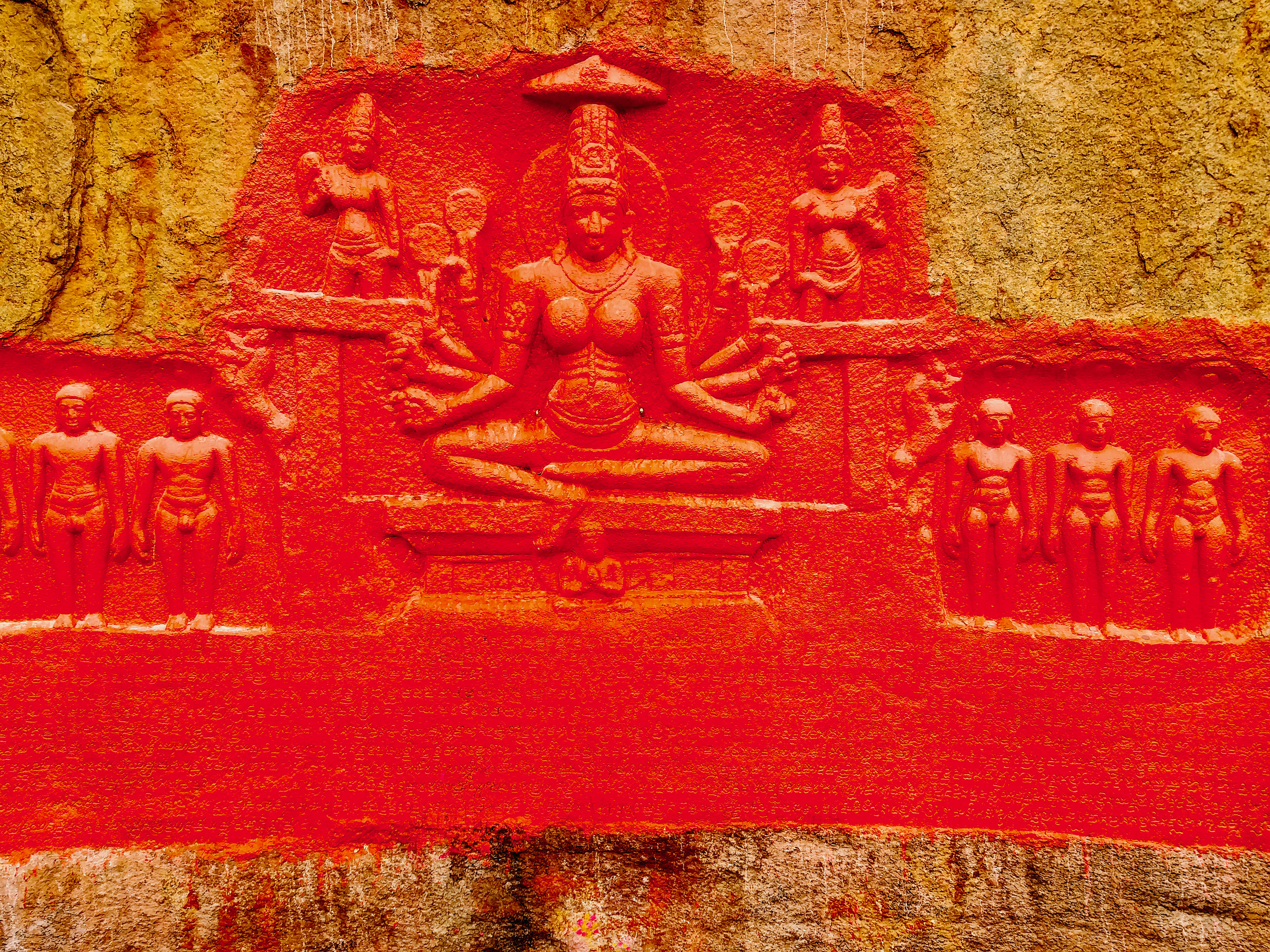
Bommalagutta dates back to 945 CE

Chakreshvari is the shasanadevi or attendant goddess of Rishabhanatha. Jain iconographic texts prescribe several forms of the goddess, differing in the number of arms and attributes. Her distinguishing attributes are the chakra and her mount, Garuda. In one common form, Chakreshvari has eight arms and rides Garuda. One hand is shown in the varada or boon-bestowing gesture, while her other hands carry attributes including the discus, bow and noose. Jain and non-Jain iconographic texts also prescribe forms of Chakreshvari with a greater number of arms. The Rupamandana, for example, describes a twelve-armed form in which eight hands carry discs, while the remaining hands carry thunderbolts and citrons. The prominence of the discus in these representations distinguishes Chakreshvari from the other principal Jain yakshinis. Her association with Garuda is another characteristic element of her iconography.

== Sculptural representations ==
Representations of Chakreshvari are known from a number of medieval Jain sites in northern and western India. Her images occur both independently and as an attendant figure in sculptural programmes associated with Rishabhanatha. An important representation survives at the Maladevi Temple at Gyaraspur. The goddess is depicted riding Garuda and carrying attributes including a noose, thunderbolt and discus. Chakreshvari also occurs prominently in the Jain sculptural remains at Deogarh, where images of the yakshas and yakshinis accompany the extensive representations of the Tirthankaras.

== Association with Rishabhanatha ==
As the attendant goddess of Rishabhanatha, Chakreshvari frequently forms a pair with Gomukha, the yaksha associated with the first Tirthankara. The Gomukha–Chakreshvari pair is among the recurring yaksha-yakshi combinations in Jain sculpture. Her presence in the iconographic programme of Rishabhanatha images serves to identify her position within the group of twenty-four shasanadevatas associated with the Tirthankaras.

== Worship ==
Chakreshvari developed an important position in Jain devotional practice beyond her original role as the attendant goddess of Rishabhanatha. Along with Ambika and Padmavati, she became one of the most prominent Jain yakshinis receiving independent devotional worship.

== See also ==
- Gomukha
- Padmavati
- Ambika
- Rishabhanatha
- Yakshini

== Notes ==
=== Sources ===
- Bhattacharyya, B. C. (1974). The Jaina Iconography (2nd ed.). Delhi: Motilal Banarsidass. pp. 66–67.
- Shah, Umakant P. (1987), Jaina-rūpa-maṇḍana: Jaina iconography, Abhinav Publications, ISBN 81-7017-208-X
- Vaśishṭha, Rādhākr̥shṇa (1995). Art and Artists of Rajasthan: A Study on the Art & Artists of Mewar with Reference to Western Indian School of Painting. Abhinav Publications. ISBN 9788170172840.
- Krishna, Nanditha (2014). Sacred Plants of India. United Kingdom: Penguin. ISBN 9789351186915.
- Chawdhri, L. R. (1992). Secrets of Yantra, Mantra and Tantra. Sterling Publishing. ISBN 9781845570224.
