= Gomukha =

Deity in Jain cosmology

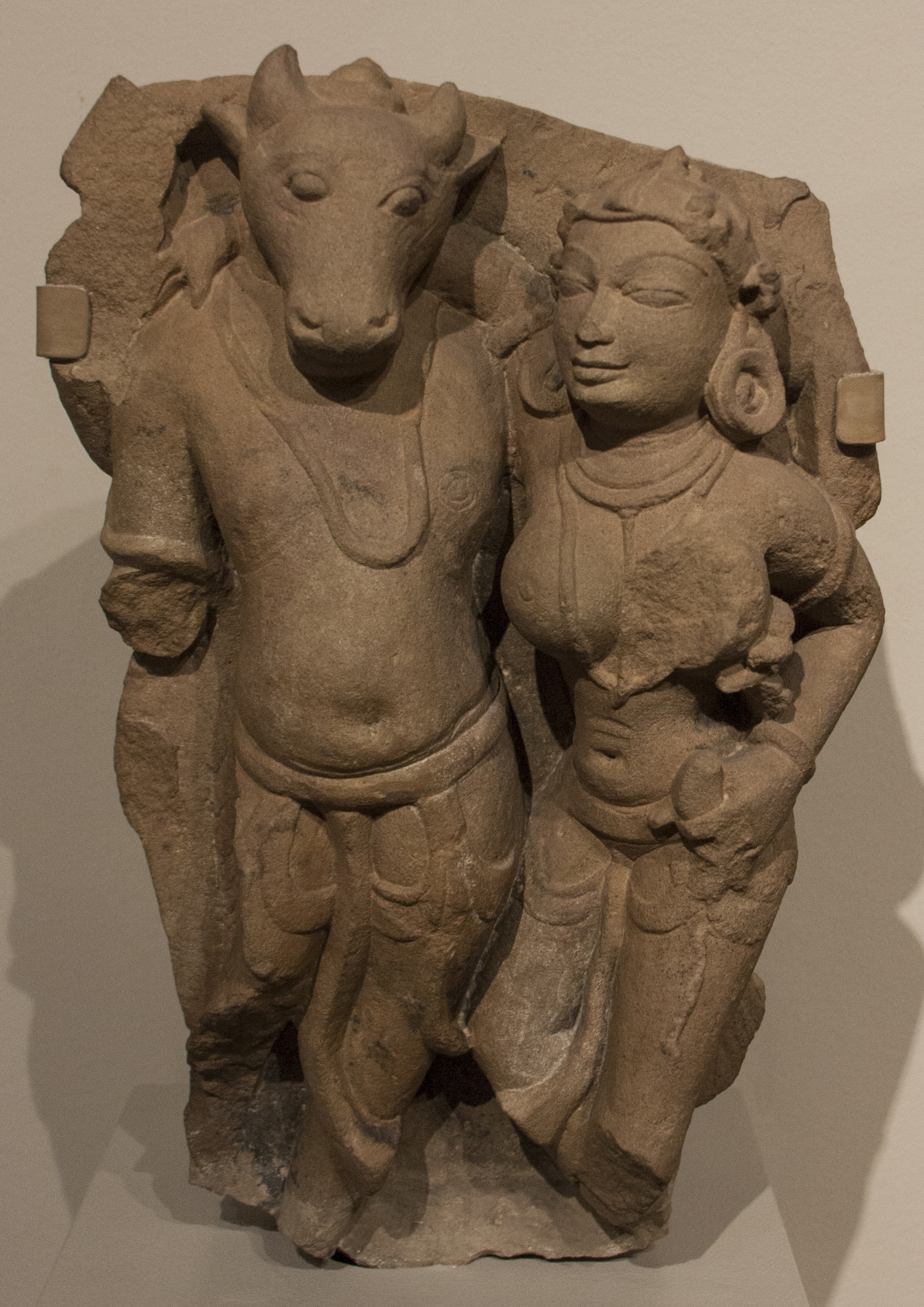
- Gomukha, c. 8th century, Gurjara-Pratihara

Genealogy
- Spouse: Chakreshvari

Gomukha is the guardian god or Yaksha (attendant deity) of Rishabhanatha, the first Tirthankara. Gomukha's iconography is closely connected with that of Rishabhanatha. His bull face and the bull associated with him correspond to the bull emblem (lanchhana) of Rishabhanatha. In Digambara iconographic texts, Gomukha may additionally bear a dharmachakra on his head.

== Legacy ==
=== Worship ===
Gomukha along with Dharanendra is the most popular yaksha in Jainism. As the attendant yaksha of Rishabhanatha, Gomukha commonly appears in sculptural representations associated with the first Tirthankara rather than exclusively as an independent deity.

=== Iconography ===
According to Jain tradition, Gomukha is depicted as a two or four armed yaksha. As the name suggests, Gomukha has the head of a bull. The iconographic descriptions of Gomukha vary between Jain texts and between the Digambara and Śvētāmbara traditions. He is generally golden in colour and is represented with a bull's face. His vahana is variously prescribed as a bull or an elephant.

Digambara texts describe Gomukha with four arms and associate him particularly with the bull. His attributes include an axe, citron, rosary and the varada (boon-giving) gesture; a dharmachakra may be represented above or on his head.

Śvētāmbara descriptions differ in some of the attributes and in the choice of vehicle. These variations are also reflected in surviving sculpture, which does not always conform strictly to the prescriptions of the iconographic texts. Images of Gomukha occur in two principal forms: as comparatively large, independent figures and as smaller attendant figures accompanying images of Rishabhanatha. The latter form is more common.

The yaksha-yakshi pair sculptures of Gomukha–Chakreshvari are one of the favoured attendant pairs, along with Ambika–Sarvanubhuti and Dharanendra–Padmavati. The association of Gomukha and Chakreshvari corresponds to their respective positions as the yaksha and yakshi of Rishabhanatha.

=== Sculptural representations ===
Gomukha is represented at a number of important medieval Jain sites. Klaus Bruhn discusses Gomukha in connection with the extensive sculptural programme of the Jain temples at Deogarh, where attendant deities form part of the iconography surrounding the Jinas.

The image of Gomukha yaksha in the Ellora Caves is noteworthy. At Ellora, Gomukha forms part of the elaborate programme of attendant deities represented in the Jain caves. José Pereira discusses these representations in his study of the iconography of the Jain monuments at Ellora. A Gomukha image from Gandhari in the former Gwalior State provides an example of variation from the textual iconographic prescriptions. The figure carries attributes including a staff and an axe, illustrating the differences that can occur between prescribed and surviving representations.

== Relationship with Rishabhanatha ==
The visual characteristics of Gomukha deliberately reinforce his association with Rishabhanatha. Rishabhanatha's identifying emblem is the bull, while Gomukha is characterised by a bull face and may himself have a bull as his vehicle. The dharmachakra assigned to Gomukha in Digambara texts provides an additional iconographic connection with Rishabhanatha. These shared symbols explain why Gomukha frequently occurs as a miniature attendant in sculptural representations of the first Tirthankara.

== See also ==
- Dharanendra
- Chakreshvari
- Padmavati
- Ambika
- Rishabhanatha
- Yaksha
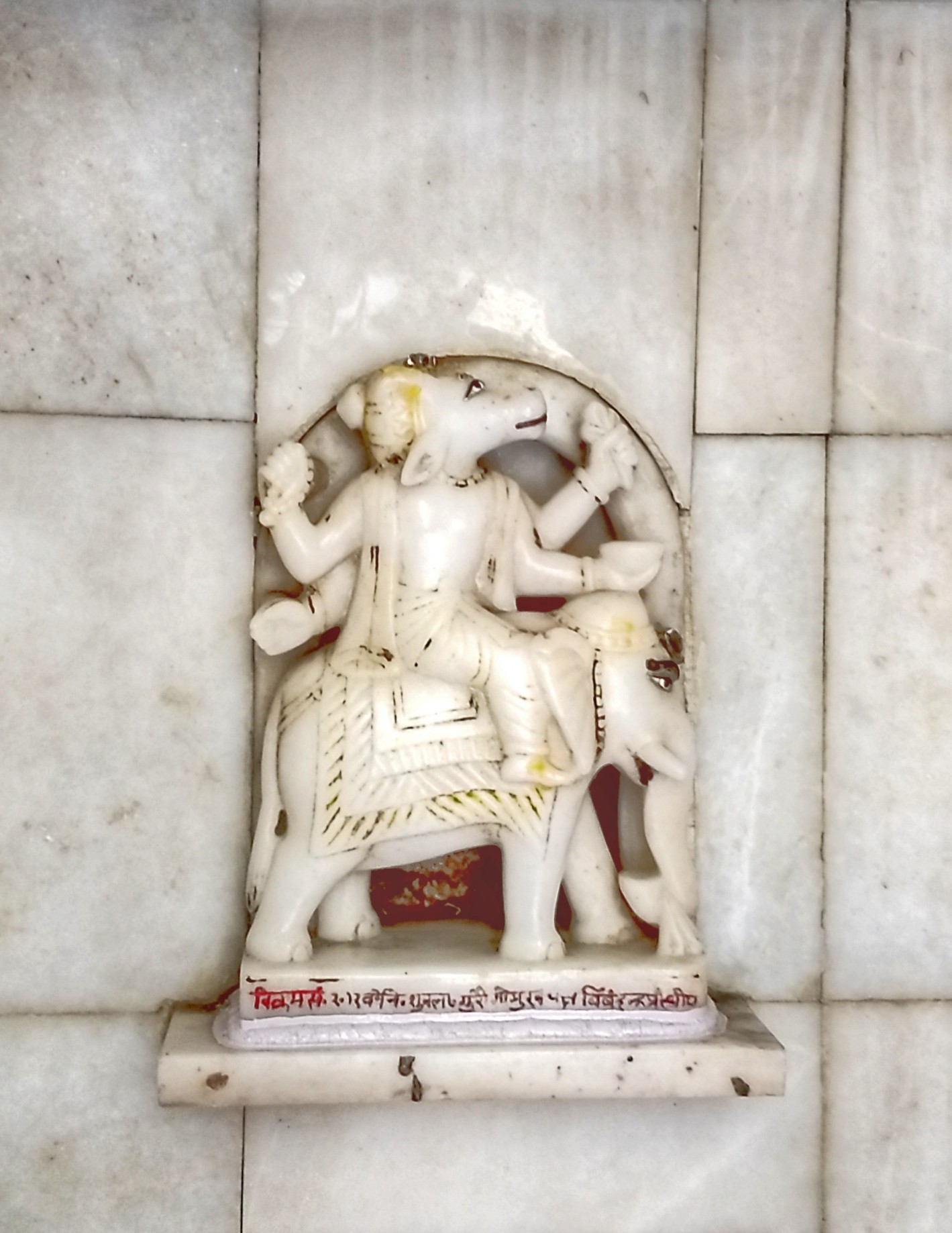
Gomukha at Dadabari, Mehrauli

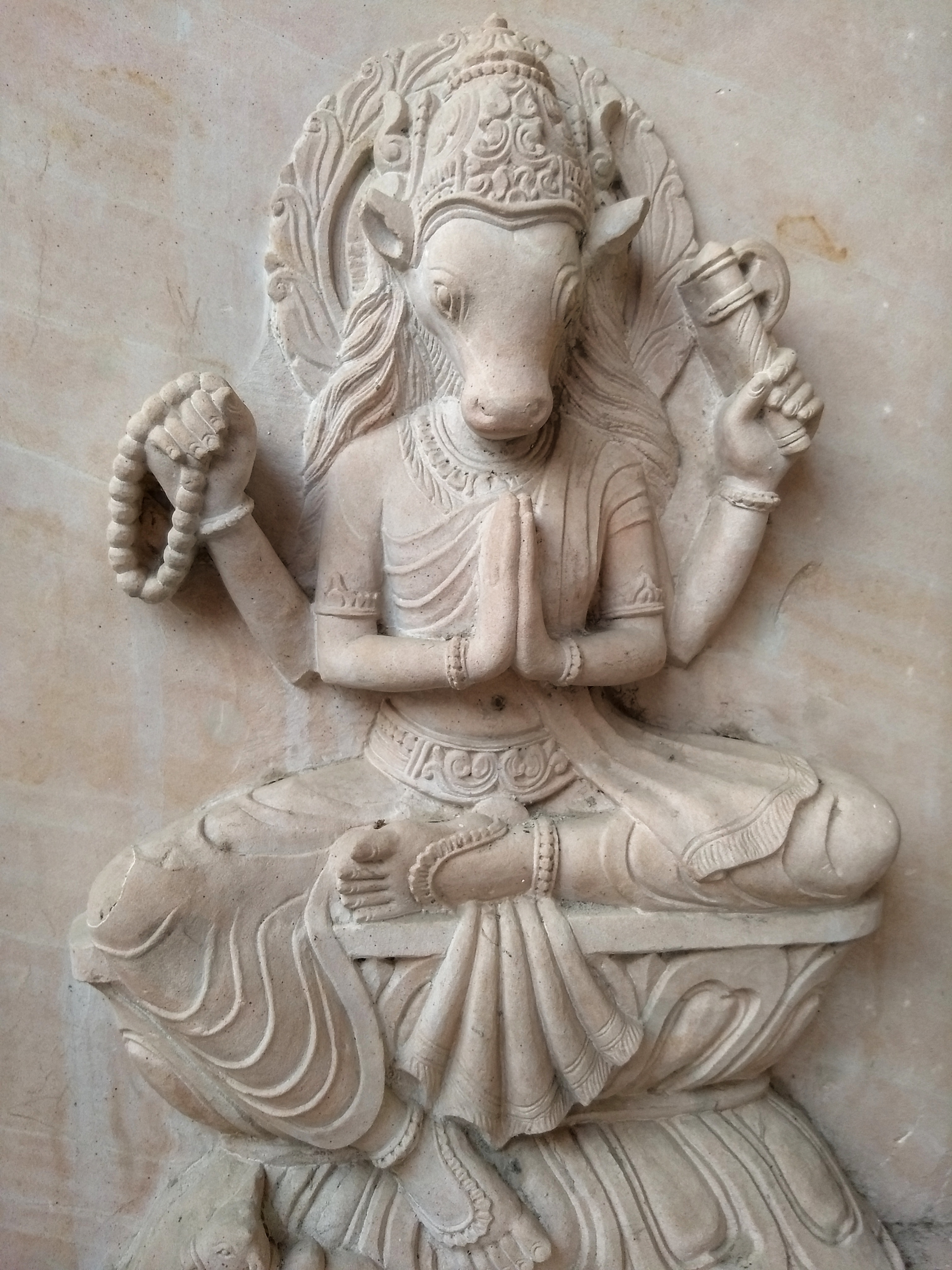
Gomukha at Trilok Teerth Dham

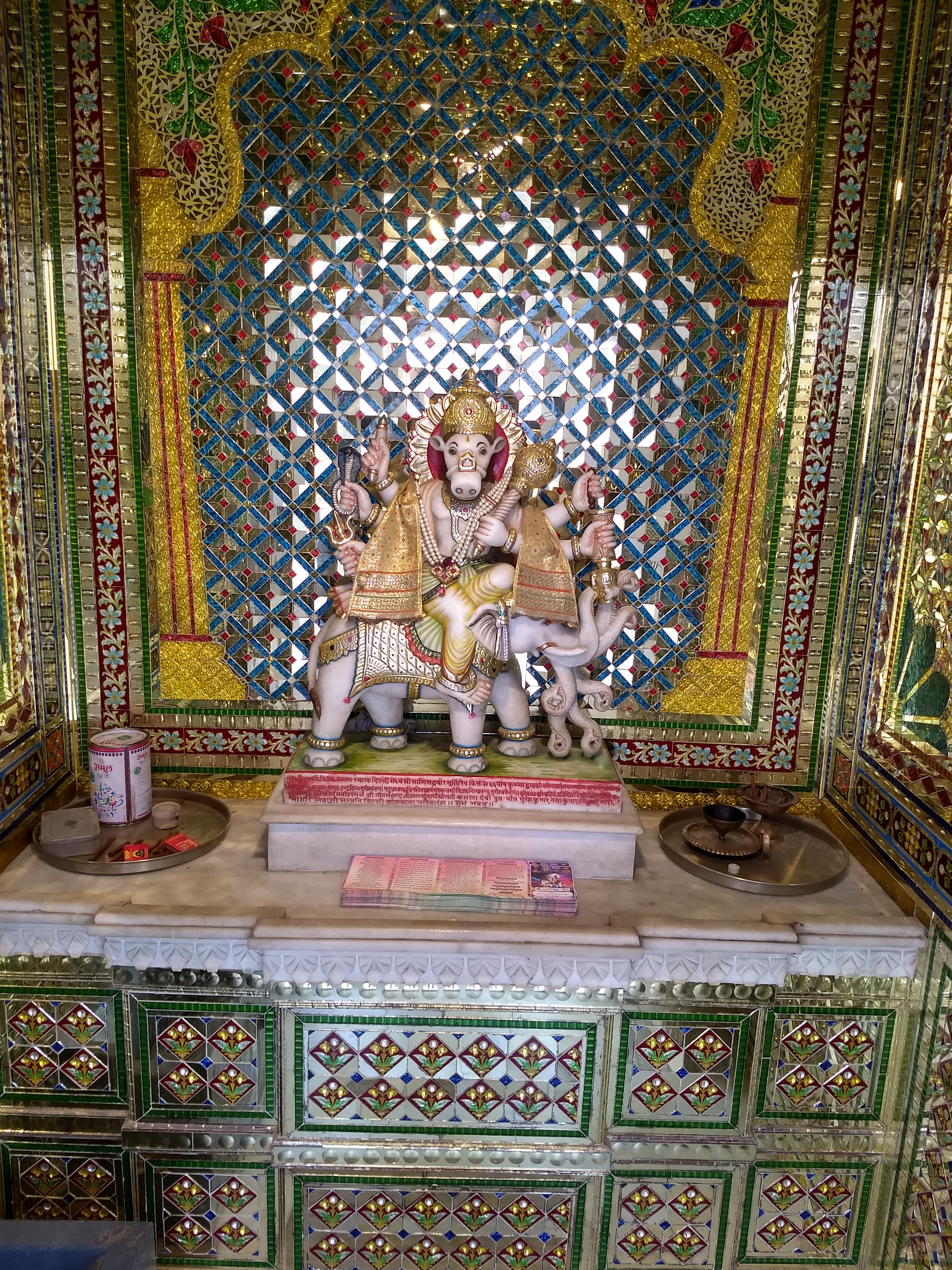
Gomukha at Shri Atma Vallabh Jain Smarak

== See also ==
- Dharanendra
- Chakreshwari
- Padmavati
- Ambika
