= Dhari, Gujarat =

Dhari, Amreli
- city and municipality
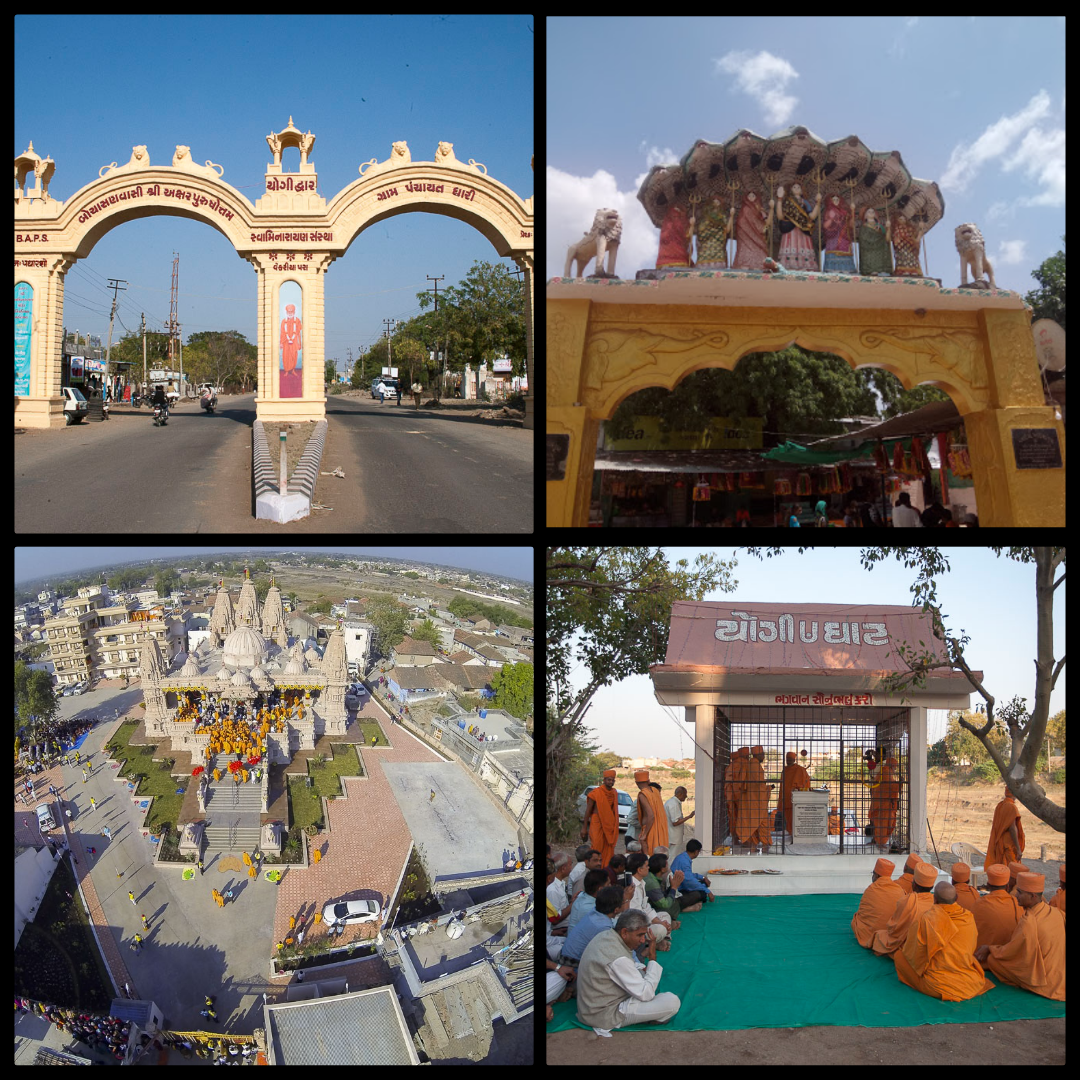
- Clockwise from top: Gate of the Dhari City, Shri Khodiyar Temple- Galadhara, Shri BAPS Yogi Ghat, Aerial View of Shri BAPS Temple

- Location in Gujarat, India Dhari, Amreli (India)
- Coordinates: 21°19′34″N 71°1′38″E
- Country: India
- State: Gujarat
- District: Amreli

Population (2011)
  - Total: 30,352

Languages
  - Official: Gujarati, Hindi
- Time zone: UTC+5:30 (IST)
- PIN: 365640
- Telephone code: 02797
- Vehicle registration: GJ-14
- Nearest city: Amreli
- Sex ratio: 1.05 ♂/♀
- Literacy: 81.26%
- Lok Sabha constituency: 41
- Website: gujaratindia.com

Dhari is a town in Amreli District in Indian state of Gujarat, India. It is an administrative headquarter of the Dhari tehsil(almost 87 villages and ness).Dhari is the most populous town in Amreli District as per census 2011 with 30352 population. Dhari is located on the bank of Shetrunji River, 42 km(26.2 mi) from district headquarter Amreli & 318 km(199.8 mi) from state capital Gandhinagar. Dhari is famous for kesar mango and Asiatic lion. Dhari is capital of East Gir Forest.

== Geography ==
Dhari is located at 21.3266°N 71.0253°E. It has an average elevation of 216m (708') above sea level. The city is located in Saurashtra region of Gujarat and is situated near the Shetrunji River, which is passes north of Palitana's hills, Shatrunjaya, then in a southeasterly direction past Talaja Hill, through a peninsula, before reaching the Gulf of Cambay, approximately 9.7 km (6 mi) north of Goapnath Point. The weather in Dhari is sunny from September to May, and rainy from June to August. The average maximum and minimum temperatures are 46 °C (114.8 °F) and 5 °C (48 °F) respectively. The average annual rainfall is about 800 millimetres (31 in).

== History ==
Dhari is a both a Taluka and city and municipality contained in that Taluka in Amreli District. Dhari has the population of about 35000. Dhari is located on the banks of river Shetrunji on which the Khodiyar Dam is built. Two other rivers, Dedhio and Nataliyo, also pass through Dhari. Dhari is connected with the rest of Gujarat by road and Meter Gauge railway on Dhasa Visavadar line, but no direct connection is available to Ahmedabad. The nearest airport is Diu, but Rajkot is also convenient. Galadhara (in Dhari) is very holy place which place of Hindu goddess "Aai shree khodiyar maa". The Khodiyar Dam is named after the Hindu goddess khodiyar which is located to Galdhara khodiyar temple in Dhari.

Mamlatdar, Principal Civil Court, Taluka Panchayat, Sub Treasury, S.D.M., Police station, and Forest Gir (East)Division, Agriculture engineering Collage, Grassland Research Station offices are in Dhari. Savar Kundala, Khambha, Amreli, Bagasara of Amreli District and Visavadar taluka of junagadh district, Kodinar and Una of Gir Somnath District are nearest Taluka Places. Tulsishyam, Kankai and Banej are holy places about 30 km away from Dhari in forest of Gir. Kesar Mango of Dhari is world famous. Famous Gir Lions can be seen in surrounding area of Dhari.

Dhari is a birthplace of the famous Swaminarayan saint Shri Jinabhai Vasanji known as Yogiji Maharaj.

Dhari has also Jain Derasar situated at Kandoi street, which is 100 years old.

Dhari has very good teaching facilities up to graduate level. Anoopam Missions Mogari's Yogiji Maharaj Mahavidyalya(Mahila Arts & Commerce College) is established in 1992. NSS is one of the activities in this college. Other self finance Arts & Commerce College is Opp. Railway Station for co-education. Recently Arunbhai Muchhala Self Finance Engineering college has been started. Even, new BAPS Swaminarayan Mandir is built on the birthplace of Shri Yogiji Maharaj which adds glory in the history of the town.

== Notable people ==
Dhari is the birthplace of Yogiji Maharaj, the fourth spiritual successor of Swaminarayan as per the Bochasanwasi Akshar Purushottam Swaminarayan Sanstha. It is also birth place of Diwaliben Bhil, who know is also koyal of Gujarat.

Arjan Koli and Hari Koli were two Koli brothers from dhari town. They saved the life of Maharaja Sayajirao Gaekwad of Baroda State from a lion during hunting in 1933. After that both brothers were respected in open court and their statues were established in royal baug by Sayajirao Gaekwad.
