= Aayavej =

Village in Bhavnagar district, Gujarat, India

Coordinates: 21°23′20″N 71°44′33″E

Ayavej or Aiavej is a village in Palitana Taluka of Bhavnagar district of Gujarat, India.

== History ==
It was one of the principal seats of the Sarvaiyas. It was a small separate tribute-paying state in the division of the province called Una Sarvaiya, and is situated ten miles south-west of Palitana. The river Shatrunji flows about one mile to the north of the village. It is an ancient village and is famous as having been the site of a temple of the Khodiar Mata in the time of Ra Navghan I of Junagad, who was carried here by his nurse when an infant at the time Junagadh was taken and Ra Dyas slain by the king of Anhilwad Patan. It was a taluka of two villages Aayavej and Virpur, and was under the Chok thana during British rule.
