= Dhari taluka =

Taluka Gujarat, India

Dhari Taluka
- Taluka of Gujarat
- Interactive map of Dhari Taluka
- Coordinates: 21°19′34″N 71°1′38″E
- Country: India
- State: Gujarat
- District: Amreli
- Headquarters: Dhari

Population (2011)
  - Total: 139,807
  - Sex ratio: 961 ♂/♀
  - Literacy: 75.8%

Languages
  - Official: Gujarati, Hindi
- Time zone: UTC+5:30 (IST)
- Telephone code: +91-079
- Vehicle registration: GJ
- Website: amreli.nic.in

Dhari Taluka is a geographical subdivision located in the western Indian state of Gujarat, situated in the Amreli district. Dhari Taluka encompasses a diverse range of topographical features, cultural nuances, and economic activities that contribute to its unique identity. Dhari is the headquarters of the taluka.

== History ==
Prehistoric traces indicate that Dhari Taluka has been inhabited since antiquity, with archaeological findings suggesting human habitation dating back to prehistoric times. The region's geographical location in the vicinity of the Gir Forest, a significant natural reserve and home to the endangered Asiatic lion, has likely contributed to its early settlement.

in the medieval period, Dhari Taluka oscillating between various ruling powers. Its proximity to Junagadh, a historically significant princely state, meant that the taluka frequently found itself under the dominion of the various dynasties that held sway over the broader region. Over time, Dhari Taluka witnessed the rise and fall of numerous local and regional rulers, each leaving their indelible mark on the socio-cultural fabric of the land.

During the colonial era, Dhari Taluka, like much of India, came under the influence of British colonial rule. The taluka's strategic location and agrarian significance attracted the attention of colonial administrators.

Post-independence, Dhari Taluka became an integral part of the Indian republic, experiencing transformative changes in various spheres. The region's agrarian economy underwent modernization, with the introduction of new agricultural practices and technologies aimed at boosting productivity.

== Geography ==
Map of Amreli district

Dhari Taluka is a geographical subdivision located in the western Indian state of Gujarat.

Dhari Taluka occupies a strategic position between latitudes 20.7437° N and 21.0266° N, and longitudes 70.7303° E and 71.1116° E. It shares borders with other talukas within the Amreli district, namely Amreli, Rajula, and Jafrabad, each characterized by its own geographical attributes.

The landscape of Dhari Taluka is predominantly defined by a blend of semi-arid plains, rolling hills, and riverine tracts. The Shetrunji River, a significant watercourse in the region, meanders through Dhari, not only serving as a source of water but also shaping the land through its erosional and depositional processes. The river's basin supports agriculture and sustains local flora and fauna.

The climate of Dhari Taluka is characterized by a semi-arid climate, with hot and dry summers and relatively milder winters. The monsoon season, extending from June to September, brings much-needed rainfall that replenishes water resources and supports agricultural activities.

Infrastructure and connectivity have improved over the years, aiding the development of Dhari Taluka. Road networks link it to neighboring towns and cities, facilitating the movement of people and goods. The administrative and educational institutions in the taluka are pivotal in shaping its growth and development.

== Economy ==
Agriculture forms the backbone of Dhari Taluka's economy, with its fertile alluvial plains being conducive to the cultivation of various crops. The predominant crops include groundnuts (peanuts), cotton, bajra, and sesame. The region's agrarian lifestyle is deeply embedded in its cultural fabric, influencing festivals, traditions, and daily life.

== Culture ==
Dhari Taluka is known for its vibrant traditions, festivals, and folk art forms.
