= Khodiyar Dam =

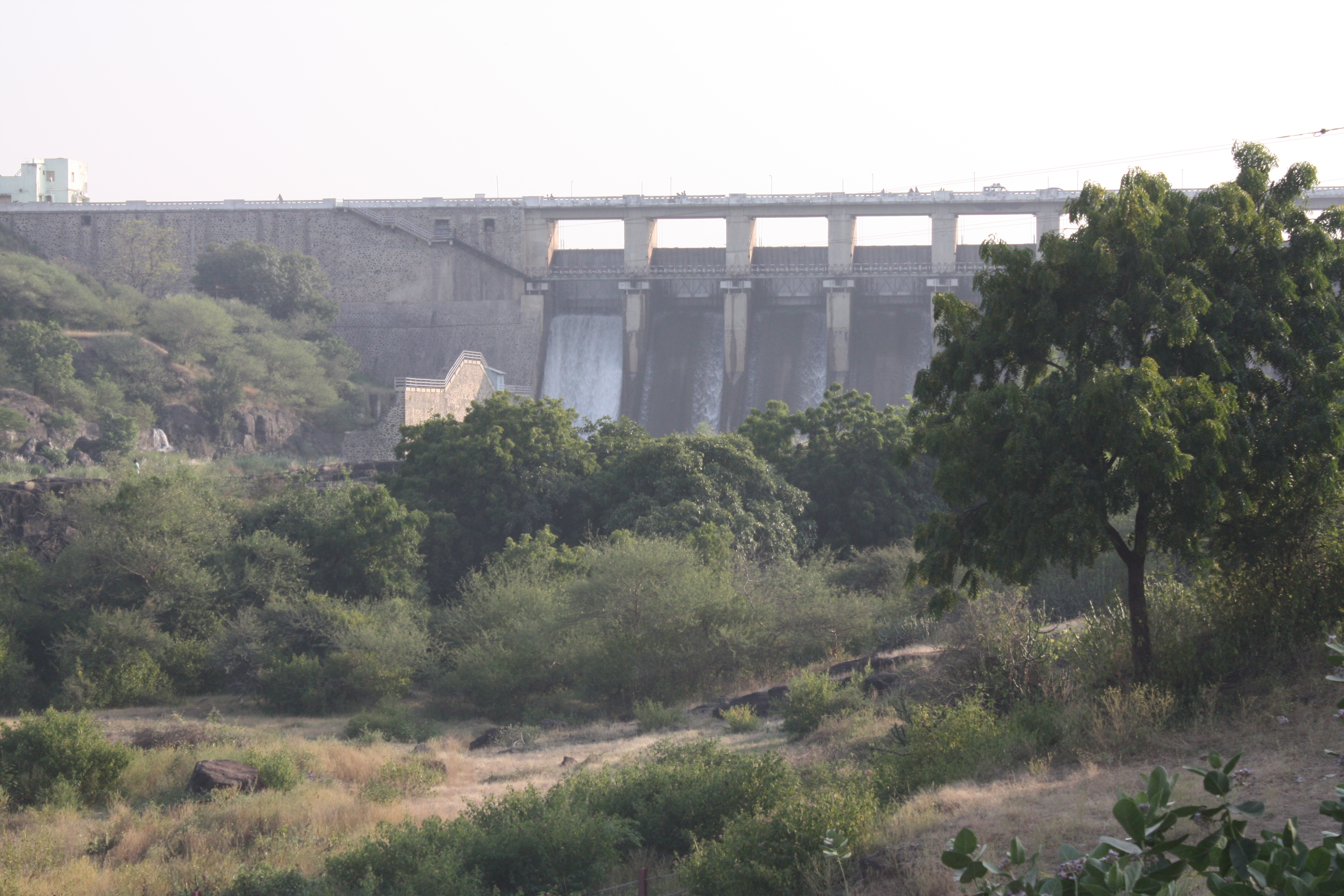
- Khodiyar dam water flow
- Interactive map of Khodiyar Dam
- Country: India
- Location: Dhari, Gujarat
- Coordinates: 21°21′25″N 71°2′45″E
- Purpose: Irrigation
- Status: Completed
- Construction began: 1958
- Opening date: 1967
- Construction cost: ₹ 187.67 lac
- Owner: Government of Gujarat

Dam and spillways
- Type of dam: Embankment/gravity composite
- Height (foundation): 36.27 m (119 ft)
- Length: 497 m (1,631 ft)
- Dam volume: 167,000 m^{3} (218,428 cu yd)
- Spillway type: Ogee, gated
- Spillway capacity: 2,409 m^{3}/s (85,073 cu ft/s)

Reservoir
- Total capacity: 32,220,000 m^{3} (26,121 acre⋅ft)
- Catchment area: 383 km^{2} (148 mi^{2})

The Khodiyar Dam is a dam built on Shetrunji River in Gujarat in western India. The primary purpose of the dam is to provide water for irrigation. It was completed in 1967 and a canal off the reservoir's right bank was completed the next year. The 36.27 m (119 ft) tall earthen dam has a concrete gravity section which serves as the service spillway and an emergency spillway is located on its right bank.
