= Shetrunji River =

Coordinates: 21°19′N 72°07′E

Shetrunji

Location
- Country: India
- State: Gujarat

Physical characteristics
- Source
  - location: Gir Jungle, near Dalkahwa, Amreli, Gujarat
- Mouth
  - location: Arabian Sea, India
- Length: 277 km (172 mi)
- Basin size: 5,636 km^{2} (2,176 sq mi)
- Discharge
  - location: Arabian Sea

Basin features
- Tributaries
  - left: Satali, Thebi, Gagario, Rajaval, Kharo
  - right: Shel, Khari, Talaji

Shetrunji River (alternate: Satrunji) is an Eastward-flowing river from Gir to Gulf of Khambhat in Bhavnagar, Gujarat, in western India. It rises at Chachai hills in Gir forest.

== Geography ==
It rises northeast of the Gir Hills, near Dhari in Amreli district. Its course begins east-northeast along a lineament which runs parallel to the Narmada Fault, passes north of Palitana's hills, Shatrunjaya, then in a southeasterly direction past Talaja Hill, through a peninsula, before reaching the Gulf of Cambay, approximately 6 miles (9.7 km) north of Goapnath Point. It has two mouths, one situated approximately 4.5 miles (7.2 km) north of the point, and the other being an additional 1.5 miles (2.4 km) to the north. Situated 4.5 miles (7.2 km) eastward of the river's mouth is Sultanpur Shoal.

Shetrunji's basin has a maximum length of 227 kilometres (141 mi). The total catchment area of the basin is 5,636 square kilometres (2,176 sq mi). Along with the Ghelo, Kalubhar, and the Vagad Rivers, the Shetrunji is a principal river of the district, and the second largest river in the region of Saurashtra. The brackish stream, Gagadio, joins the Shetrunji about 2 kilometres (1.2 mi) from Krankach. Khodiyar Mata is an approximately 50 feet (15 m) waterfall near Dhari. The topography is a mix of hills and plains.

== Features ==
The Palitana dam was built in 1959 across the river at Nani-Rajasthali and represents Shetrunji's irrigation scheme. This scheme is meant to provide river water to a cultivation area of 56,000–86,000 acres (23,000–35,000 ha) of land. Shetrunji supplies drinking water to Bhavnagar. A small port is located at Sultanpur.

== Culture ==
Palitana is situated near the river, serving as the base town for the hills of Shatrunjaya upon which are the Palitana temples, an important place of worship for Jains.A group of Derasars are located at the banks of the river near to the Shatrunjaya hills.

A shrine of Khodiyar Mata is situated within the Shetrunji's lower reaches. Middle to Upper Palaeolithic sites have been found along the river. Archaeological exploration along the river has noted 22 settlements which date circa 1st century BCE to 1st century CE. The sites included nine fishing villages, a mixed use fishing-agrarian village, a mixed use agrarian-salt-farming village, as well as a regional centre. Of these, Padri village dates to the Harappan period, while Hathab village was the largest in the lower river valley,
