= Shatrunjaya =

Hill in Gujarat, India

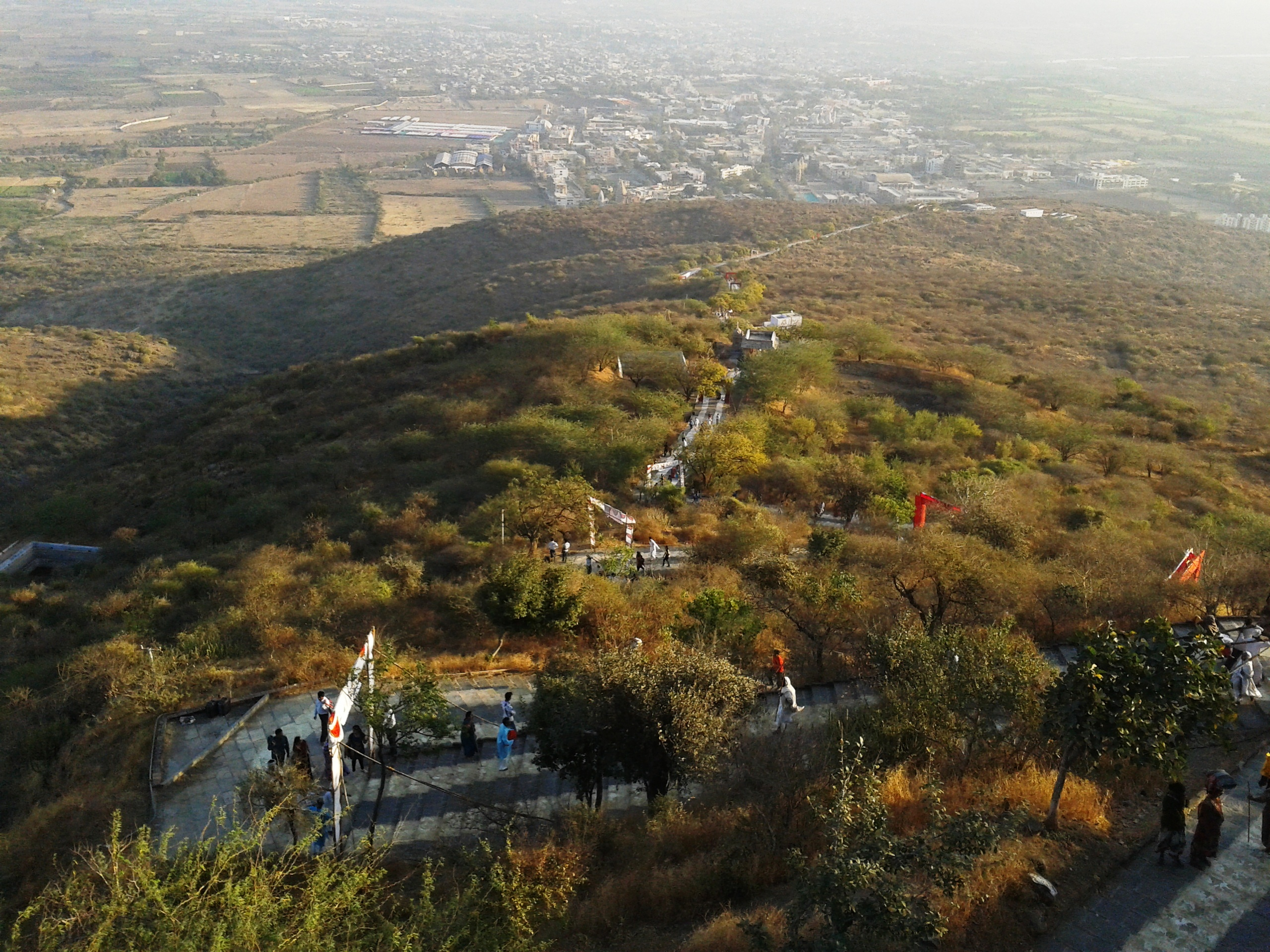
- View of pilgrims ascending Shatrunjaya Hill

Highest point
- Elevation: 580 m (1,900 ft)Archaeological Survey of India
- Coordinates: 21°28′6″N 71°48′0″E

Geography
- Location within Gujarat
- Location: Palitana, Bhavnagar district, Gujarat, India

Shatrunjaya, also spelled Shetrunjaya ("place of victory against inner enemies") and originally known as Pundarikgiri, is a range of hills located near the city of Palitana in the Bhavnagar district of Gujarat, India. The hills are situated on the banks of the Shetrunji River at an elevation of approximately 164 feet (50 m) above sea level. These hills bear similarities to other locations where Jain temples have been constructed, including those in Bihar, Gwalior, Mount Abu, and Girnar.

The sacred Jain hill of Shatrunjaya is home to 865 temples. The site was sanctified when Rishabha, the first Tirthankara of Jainism, delivered his sermons on the summit.

The ancient significance of the hills is also attributed to Pundarik Swami, a chief Ganadhara and the grandson of Rishabha, who is believed to have attained Nirvana or Moksha here. His shrine is located opposite the main temple of Adinath, which was built by Bharata, the son of Rishabha.

Alternate spellings include Śatruñjaya, Satrunjaya, Shetrunja, and Shetrunjo. Shatrunjaya was also known as Pundarikgiri, as Pundarik Swami is believed to have attained nirvana on the mountain. Other names include Siddhakshetra or Siddhanchal, since many Tirthankaras are said to have attained enlightenment there.

Shatrunjaya is considered the most sacred pilgrimage site in Jainism.

== Etymology ==
The name Shatrunjaya, where the sacred Mount Shatrunjaya is located, means "place of victory" or "that which conquers enemies".

== Geography ==
The Gulf of Khambhat lies to the south of the Shatrunjaya Hills, while the town of Bhavnagar is located to the north. A river flows between the two main hills. According to legend, the hills are considered part of the Girnar ranges. A path along the ridge descends into the Aadpur Valley, covering a distance of approximately 13 kilometres (8.1 mi). The town of Palitana is situated at the base of the foothills, around 56 kilometres (35 mi) from Bhavnagar. The region's topography is rugged, and the landscape is prone to drought.

== Culture ==
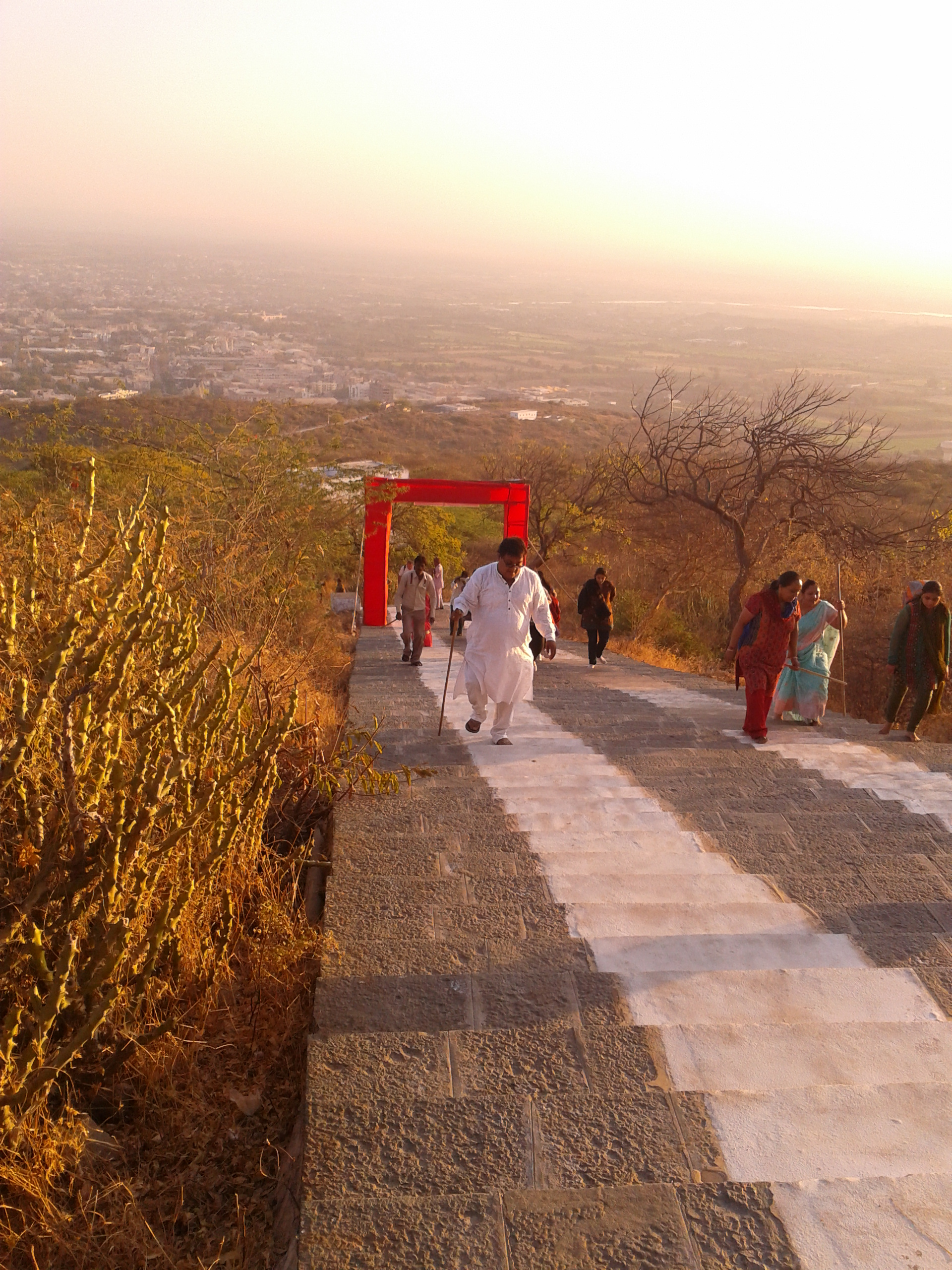
Pilgrims climbing the stairs of Shatrunjaya Maha Tirth

The hills are an ancient tirtha (religious pilgrimage site). The Palitana temples, a sacred pilgrimage complex located on both hills and the saddle between them, are accessed by ascending approximately 3,750 stone steps carved into the mountain. The climb spans about 3.5 kilometres (2.2 mi) from the base and typically takes around two hours.

The hills are closed to pilgrims for four months during the monsoon season. The pilgrimage is known as the "Shri Shatrunjay Teerth Yatra", and it takes place on the Poornima (full moon day) of the Kartik month, according to the Jain calendar (October–November in the Gregorian calendar). Thousands of Jains gather at the base of the hills to participate in the yatra (religious journey). During this significant pilgrimage, considered a once-in-a-lifetime event by many Jains, devotees circumambulate the Shatrunjaya Hills, covering a distance of approximately 216 kilometres (134 mi) on foot while offering prayers.

== See also ==
- Palitana temples
- Palitana

== Bibliography ==
- Deshpande, Aruna (2005). India:Divine Destination. Crest Publishing House. pp. 418–419. ISBN 81-242-0556-6.
