= Diwaliben Bhil =

Indian folk singer (1943–2016)

Diwaliben Bhil દિવાળીબેન ભીલ
- Born: Diwaliben Punjabhai Ladhia; 2 June 1943; Dalkhania village (now in Dhari Taluka, Amreli district, Bombay presidency, British India
- Died: 19 May 2016 (aged 72) Junagadh, Gujarat, India
- Genres: Folk music
- Occupations: Folk singer, playback singer

Diwaliben Punjabhai Bhil (2 June 1943 – 19 May 2016), also known as Diwaliben Punjabhai Ladhia, was an Indian folk singer and playback singer from Gujarat. Her talent was discovered late; she then sang on radio and in Gujarati films and was awarded the Padma Shri in 1990.

== Biography ==
Diwaliben Bhil was born on 2 June 1943 in Dalkhania village (now in Dhari Taluka, Amreli district, Gujarat) to Punjabhai and Monghiben in a tribal family. Her original surname was Ladhiya. Inspired by her mother, she started singing traditional garba songs at an early age. She was a primary-school dropout, but had taught herself folk singing. She moved to Junagadh at the age of nine, when her father found a job on the Junagadh State Railway. She was married in Rajkot at the age of nine, but her marriage was declared null and void after only two days due to disagreements; she never married again. Around the age of twenty, she got a job in a hospital and worked there for ten years. Later, she worked as a domestic helper in the nurses' quarters of the Junagadh Public Hospital. She moved to Junagadh and lived with her brother in the Ghanghiram area.

In 1964, Gujarati folk singer Hemu Gadhavi spotted her talent and arranged her first recording for the All India Radio-Rajkot for a payment of five Rupees. Social worker Ratubhai Adani took her to Delhi, where she won the first prize in the Folk Music Festival. Musician Kalyanji heard her during her stage performance in Mumbai, and invited her to sing as a playback singer in Gujarati films. Jesal Toral (1971) was her first film and her song "Paap Taru Parkash Jadeja.." from the film become very popular. She travelled across India and abroad for performances. She conducted several stage performances with Pranlal Vyas. She worked in a primary school of Gomta village near Gondal.

She died on 19 May 2016 of natural causes, after a long period of illness.

== Works ==
Diwaliben was a self-taught singer, and did not receive any formal education in music.

Diwaliben sang large numbers of folk songs, garbas, bhajans and Gujarati film songs, and recorded and released cassettes of them. She received recognition for her folk song "Aiwa Aiwa" from the album Mann ke Manjeere (2001). The folk song was from the Kharwa community of Saurashtra. Some of her notable songs are "Marey Todle Betho Mor", "Sona Vatkdi Re Kesar Gholya", "Vage Che Re", "Ram Na Ban Vagya", "Hari Na Ban Vagya Re", "Halo Ne Kathiyavadi Re", "Kokilkanthi", "Hoon To Kagalaiyan Lakhi Lakhi Thaki", "Varse Varse Ashadhi Kere Megh" and "Chelaiya Khama Khamare" from the Gujarati film, Halo Gamde Jaiye. She had worked with several musicians and singers such as Hemu Gadhvi, Lakhabhai Gadhvi, Ismail Valera, Veljibhai Gajjar, Karsan Sagathiya, Praful Dave, Bhikhudan Gadhvi, Usha Mangeshkar, Damyanti Bardai, Murli Meghani and Anandkumar.

== Recognition ==
Bhil was felicitated by the Gujarati Society in London during her visit. She was awarded the Padma Shri, the fourth-highest civilian award from the Government of India, in 1990. The Government of Gujarat awarded her the Gujarat Gaurav Puraskar. She was the recipient of 2011 Kavi Kag Award.

== Selected filmography ==
- Jesal Toral (1971)
- Hothal Padamani (1974)
- Bhadar Tara Vaheta Pani (1976)
- Ganga Sati (1979)
- Maniyaro (1980)
- Ra Navghan 1976
- Sati Savitri
- Lankani Ladi Ghogha No Var (1978)
- Mandavda Ropavo Manaraj
- Machu Tara Vaheta Pani
- Goral Garasani (1982)
- Sonba Ane Roopba
- Ashadhi Bij
- Sampurn Ramayan
- Veer Abhal Valo
- Bhagat Pipaji
- Pithi No Rang
- Maiyar Ma Mandu Nathi Lagtu
- Shamalshano Vivah
- Vat Vachan Ane Ver
- Mali Methan
- Virangna Nathibai
- Diyar Vatu
- Sonbai Ni Chundadi
- Sant Tulsidas
- Lako Loyan
