= Palitana =

- Town
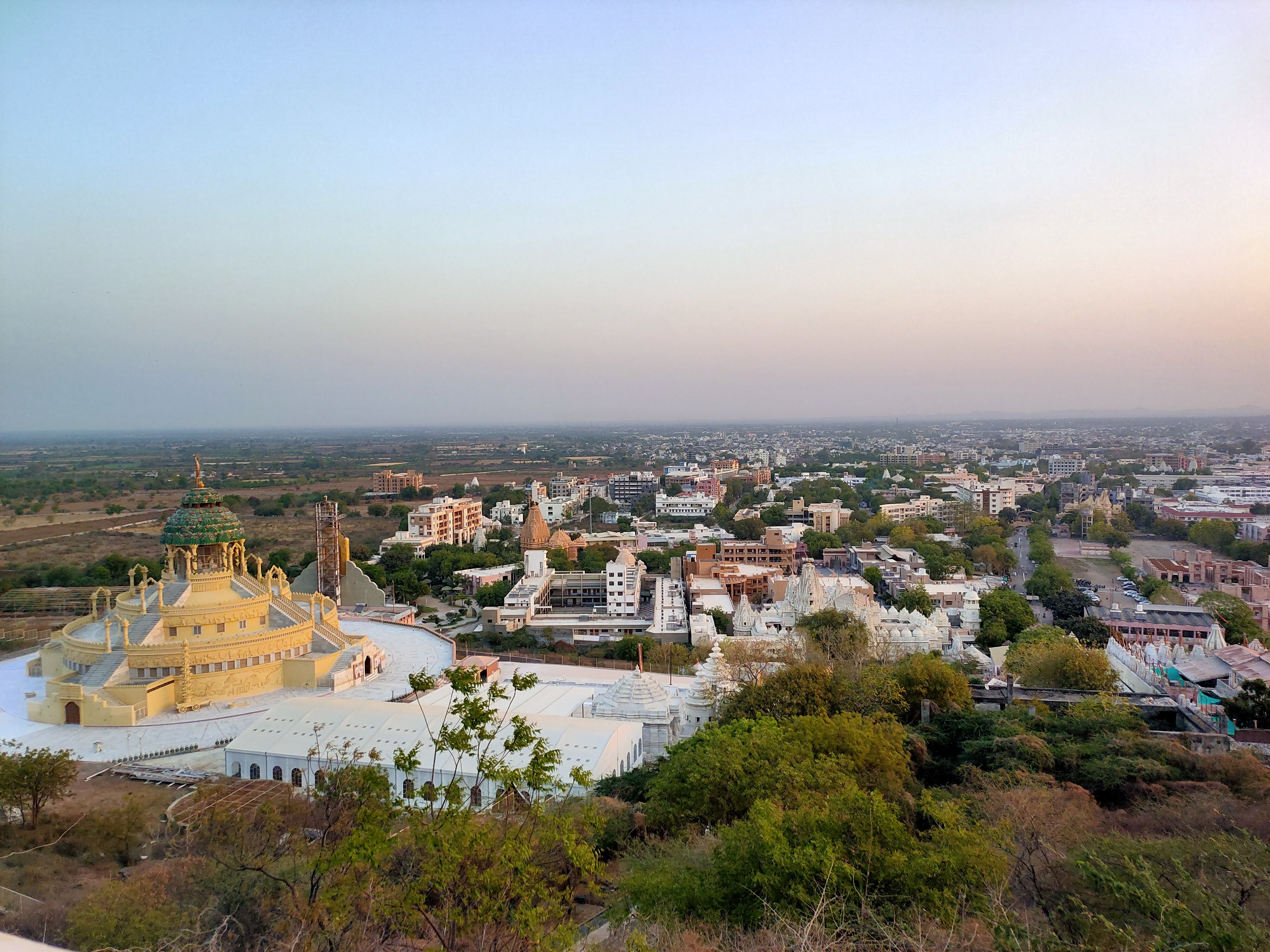
- View of Palitana

- Location in Gujarat, India
- Coordinates: 21.52°N 71.83°E
- Country: India
- State: Gujarat
- District: Bhavnagar
- Established: 1812

Government
  - Type: Municipal
  - Body: Palitana municipal corporation

Area
  - Total: 83.2 km^{2} (32.1 sq mi)
- Elevation: 66 m (217 ft)

Population (2011)
  - Total: 64,497
- Demonym: Palitani
- Time zone: UTC+5:30 (IST)
- STD code: 02848
- Vehicle registration: GJ-04(Bhavnagar)

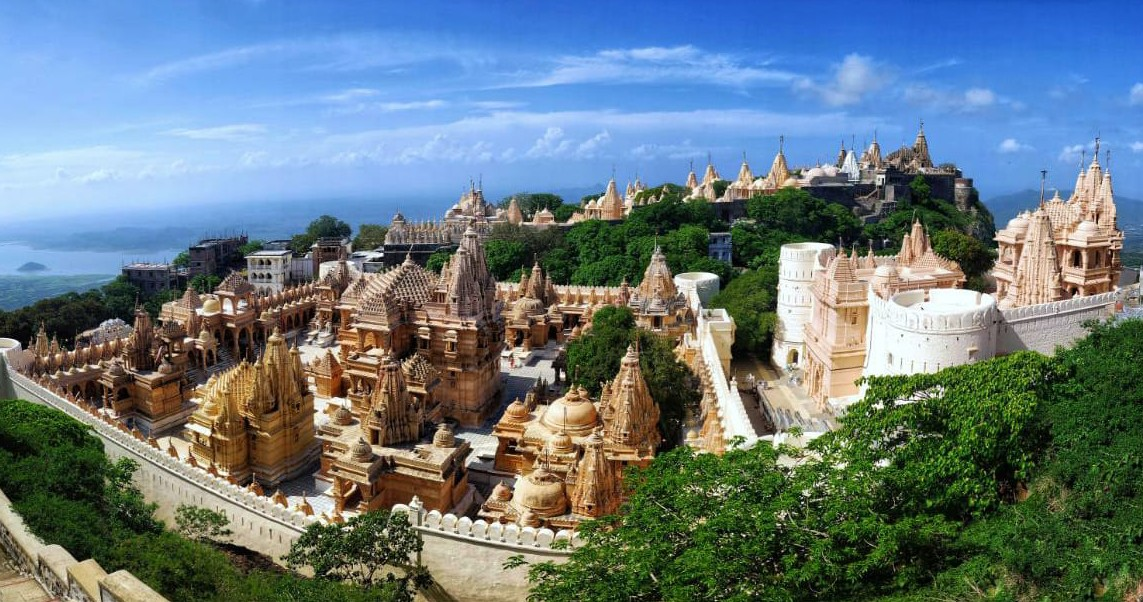
Shatrunjay Tirth, largest cluster of temples in the world at Palitana in Gujarat

Palitana is a town in the Bhavnagar district of the Indian state of Gujarat. It is one of the most significant pilgrimage destinations for followers of Jainism, renowned for the Shatrunjaya hill temples, a sprawling complex of over 900 marble temples considered among the holiest in Jainism.

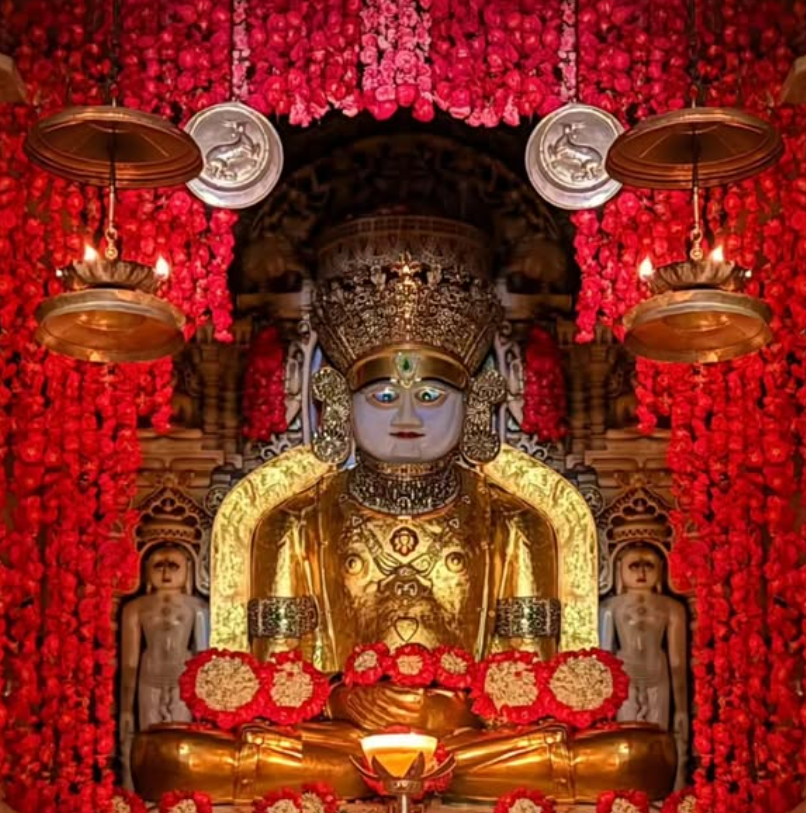
The 5 Century old idol of Lord Rishabha at Palitana

In 2014, Palitana became the first city in the world to be officially declared vegetarian, prohibiting the sale of meat, fish, and eggs, in alignment with its strong Jain ethical values. Located approximately 50 kilometres southwest of Bhavnagar, the city was historically a princely state during British rule.

== History ==
Palitana is associated with Śvetāmbaras legends and history. Ādinātha, the first of the Jain tirthankaras, is said to have meditated on the Shatrunjaya hill, where the Palitana temples were later constructed.

What eventually became Palitana State was founded in 1194. In 1656, Shah Jahan's son Murad Baksh (the then Governor of Gujarat) granted the village of Palitana to the prominent Jain merchant Shantidas Jhaveri. The management of the temples was assigned to the Anandji Kalyanji Trust in 1730.

During the British Raj, Palitana was a princely state in the Kathiawar Agency of the Bombay presidency. It ceased to exist with the establishment of independent India in 1948.

== Geography ==
Palitana is located at 21.52°N 71.83°E. It has an average elevation of 67 metres (219 feet). The Palitana dam, an irrigation resource, is on the Shetrunji River.

== Palitana temples ==
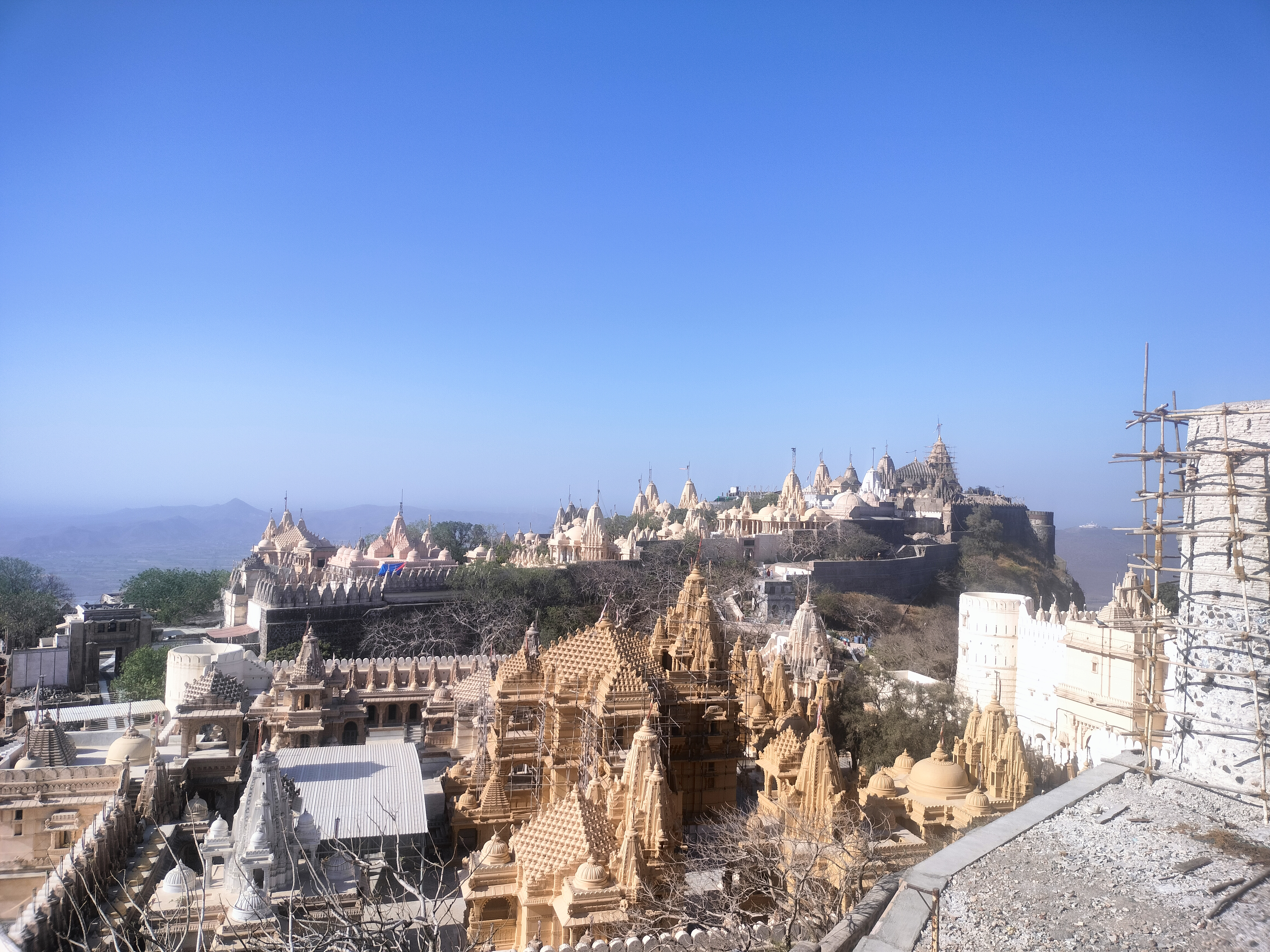
Palitana Jain temples

Palitana is the world's only mountain that has more than 900 temples. The Palitana temples and whole mountain are considered the most sacred pilgrimage place (tirtha) by the Jain community, and is the world's largest Temple Complex. There are more than 3000 temples located on the Shatrunjaya hills, exquisitely carved in marble. The main temple on top of the hill, is dedicated to the first Tirthankara Rishabhanatha (Rishabhadeva). The temples were built by generations of Jains over a period of 900 years, from the 11th century onwards. The temples are managed by the Anandji Kalyanji Trust associated with the Kasturbhai Lalbhai group. From the foot of the hill to the top there are about 3,800 stone steps to facilitate climbing.

The temples are exquisitely carved in marble, veritable prayers in stone. To an observer, these appear to be ivory miniatures when seen from a distance. Created by master craftsmen, the most important temple is that of the first teerthankara, Shri Adishwar. It has ornate architectural motifs, though in its overall plan it is simpler than the Choumukh. Other notable temples are those of Kumarpal, Vimalshah and Sampriti Raja. Kumarpal Solanki, a great Jain patron, probably built the earliest temple. The temple has a fabulous collection of jewels, and these can be seen with special permission. The temples date from 11th to the 20th century. From 1865 to 1910 it was ruled by King Dhanpat.

Belief

Every devout Jain aspires to climb to the top of the mountain at least once in his lifetime, because of its sanctity. Not just the temples on the hill are sacred, but as per Jain Scriptures entire hill is sacred right from top to bottom. The journey is arduous. The walk up the stone stairway hewn into the mountain face takes about an hour and a half. For those unable or unaccustomed to the strain, sling-chairs are available at a bargain. The code for the climbers is stringent, in keeping with the rigours of the Jain faith. Food must neither be eaten nor carried on the way. The descent must begin before it is evening, for no soul can remain atop the sacred mountain during the night.

== Vegetarianism ==
In 2014, Palitana became the first city in the world to be legally vegetarian. It has outlawed, or made illegal, the buying and selling of meat, fish and eggs, and also related jobs or work, such as fishing and penning 'food animals'.

=== Cuisine ===
The cuisine of Palitana is influenced by Jainism, which emphasizes nonviolence. Jain food excludes root vegetables to avoid harming soil-dwelling organisms. Palitana cuisine is based on dal, rice and vegetables. Popular dishes include dhokla, fafda, khandvi, gathiya, kadhi, rotlo, sev tameta nu shaak and dal dhokli.

== Demographics ==
As of 2011 India census, Palitana had a population of approximately 64,497. Males constitute 52% of the population and females 48%. Palitana has an average literacy rate of 74%, higher than the national average of 59.5%: male literacy is 71%, and female literacy is 57%. In Palitana, 15% of the population is under 6 years of age.

According to 2011 Census of India, 91.77% of the population was reportedly Hindus with other religious communities making up rest of the population.

== Transportation ==
By air

The nearest airport at Bhavnagar lies at a distance of 51 kilometres from Palitana, with daily flights to Mumbai, Surat and Ahmedabad, 215 kilometres away by road, has an international airport with regular flights to many important cities.

Keeping in mind the religious and tourism travel, the State government has initiated the process of land acquisition for a new airport at Palitana as part of its plan to establish 11 new airports in Gujarat. The pre-feasibility study has been handed over to the Airport Authority of India (AAI).

By rail

Palitana has a small railway station, Palitana railway station, that is connected to Sihor and Bhavanagar. Most of the trains stop at Sihor, which is connected to Ahmedabad and Gandhinagar.

By road

There are hourly buses for Bhavnagar from Palitana. Regular buses are also available for Ahmedabad, Talaja, Una, and Diu. The total journey time to Una or Diu is around 6 hours as the roads are in good condition. Taxis are also available on hire for Palitana from Bhavnagar, Ahmedabad or Vadodra. The bus stand is situated 800 meters away from the Palitana railway station.
