= Fourth Sukhadia ministry =

Government of Rajasthan, India

- 9th Ministry of Rajasthan
- Date formed: 26 April 1967
- Date dissolved: 9 July 1971

People and organisations
- Governor: Hukum Singh; Jagat Narain (acting); Hukum Singh
- Chief Minister: Mohan Lal Sukhadia
- Member party: Indian National Congress
- Status in legislature: Majority government
- Opposition party: Swatantra Party and others
- Opposition leader: Laxman Singh

History
- Election: 1967 election
- Legislature term: 4th Rajasthan Assembly
- Predecessor: President’s rule
- Successor: First Barkatullah Khan ministry

The Fourth Sukhadia ministry was the council of ministers headed by Mohan Lal Sukhadia in Rajasthan. It was formed on 26 April 1967 after a period of President’s rule and served during the fourth Rajasthan Legislative Assembly until 9 July 1971.

== Background and tenure ==
President’s rule had operated from 13 March to 26 April 1967. The Assembly’s tenure record reports 103 members on the ruling side and 81 in the opposition, with Laxman Singh as leader of the opposition. Sukhadia was succeeded by Barkatullah Khan.

A complete, reliably digitised portfolio allocation for this ministry has not yet been located.

== See also ==
- Government of Rajasthan
- Chief Minister of Rajasthan
- Rajasthan Legislative Assembly
