= First Hari Dev Joshi ministry =

Government of Rajasthan, India

- 12th Ministry of Rajasthan
- Date formed: 11 October 1973
- Date dissolved: 29 April 1977

People and organisations
- Governor: Joginder Singh; Vedpal Tyagi (acting)
- Chief Minister: Hari Dev Joshi
- Member party: Indian National Congress
- Status in legislature: Majority government
- Opposition party: Swatantra Party and others
- Opposition leader: Laxman Singh

History
- Election: 1972 election
- Legislature term: 5th Rajasthan Assembly
- Predecessor: Second Barkatullah Khan ministry
- Successor: President’s rule

The First Hari Dev Joshi ministry was the council of ministers headed by Hari Dev Joshi in Rajasthan. It took office after the death of Barkatullah Khan in October 1973 and continued until April 1977, when President’s rule was imposed.

== Background and tenure ==
The ministry served during the fifth Rajasthan Legislative Assembly, in which the Indian National Congress held a large majority. The Assembly tenure page lists 145 Congress members and 39 members in the opposition. President’s rule operated from 30 April to 21 June 1977 before the formation of the first Shekhawat ministry.

A complete, reliably digitised portfolio allocation for this ministry has not yet been located.

== See also ==
- Government of Rajasthan
- Chief Minister of Rajasthan
- Rajasthan Legislative Assembly
