= Bandula (name) =

Bandula (බන්දුල) is a Sinhalese masculine given name. It is derived from the Sanskrit word, bándhu (बन्धु), meaning bond or kinsman.

- Bandula Vithanage (1940–2014), Sri Lankan director
- Bandula Warnapura (1953–2021), Sri Lankan cricketer
- Bandula Wijay (born 1946), Sri Lankan medical entrepreneur
- Bandula Padmakumara (1950–2022), Sri Lankan journalist
- Bandula Harischandra (died 2025), Sri Lankan politician, governor of Southern Province
- Bandula Lal Bandarigoda, Sri Lankan politician
- Bandula Basnayake (born 1947), Sri Lankan politician
- Bandula Gunawardane (born 1953), Sri Lankan politician
- Bandula Jagath, Sri Lankan cricketer
- Bandula Jayasekara (c. 1960 – 2021), Sri Lankan journalist, broadcaster, newspaper editor and diplomat
- Bandulahewa Senadheera (1936–1982), Sri Lankan politician

== See also ==
Maha Bandula (1782–1825), Burmese general of the Konbaung Dynasty.
