= Jagat =

Jagat may refer to:

- Jagat, Budaun, a block and nagar panchayat in Budaun district, Uttar Pradesh, India
- Jagat, a village in Rajasthan, India, best known for its Ambika Mata temple
- Jagat, a village in Lamjung District in the Gandaki Zone of northern-central Nepal
- Jagat (2015 film), a Malaysian crime film
- Jagat (2024 film), an Indian Gujarati-language film
- Jagath, an Indian male given name

== See also ==
- Jagati (disambiguation)
