= Second Barkatullah Khan ministry =

Government of Rajasthan, India

- 11th Ministry of Rajasthan
- Date formed: 16 March 1972
- Date dissolved: 11 October 1973

People and organisations
- Governor: Hukum Singh (to 30 June 1972); Joginder Singh
- Chief Minister: Barkatullah Khan
- Member party: Indian National Congress
- Status in legislature: Majority government
- Opposition party: Swatantra Party and others
- Opposition leader: Laxman Singh

History
- Election: 1972 election
- Legislature term: 5th Rajasthan Assembly
- Predecessor: First Barkatullah Khan ministry
- Successor: First Hari Dev Joshi ministry

The Second Barkatullah Khan ministry was the council of ministers headed by Barkatullah Khan in Rajasthan after the 1972 Rajasthan Legislative Assembly election. It was sworn in on 16 March 1972 and remained in office until Khan died in office on 11 October 1973.

== Background and tenure ==
The Indian National Congress held 145 of the 184 seats in the fifth Rajasthan Legislative Assembly. The contemporary account of the swearing-in states that the ministry initially consisted of seven cabinet ministers and three ministers of state, but does not name them. Khan was succeeded by Hari Dev Joshi.

A complete minister-by-minister portfolio allocation should be added only from the Rajasthan Gazette or an equivalent contemporary official source.

== See also ==
- Government of Rajasthan
- Chief Minister of Rajasthan
- Rajasthan Legislative Assembly
