= First Barkatullah Khan ministry =

Government of Rajasthan, India

- 10th Ministry of Rajasthan
- Date formed: 9 July 1971
- Date dissolved: 16 March 1972

People and organisations
- Governor: Hukum Singh
- Chief Minister: Barkatullah Khan
- Member party: Indian National Congress
- Status in legislature: Majority government
- Opposition party: Swatantra Party and others
- Opposition leader: Laxman Singh

History
- Election: 1967 election
- Legislature term: 4th Rajasthan Assembly
- Predecessor: Fourth Sukhadia ministry
- Successor: Second Barkatullah Khan ministry

The First Barkatullah Khan ministry was the council of ministers headed by Barkatullah Khan in Rajasthan from 9 July 1971 to 16 March 1972. It succeeded the fourth Sukhadia ministry and remained in office through the 1972 Rajasthan Legislative Assembly election.

== Background and tenure ==
Khan governed during the closing months of the fourth Rajasthan Legislative Assembly, whose ruling side had 103 of 184 members. After the 1972 election, the Congress Legislature Party re-elected him as its leader on 15 March. A contemporary political register records that a new council of ministers headed by Khan was sworn in on 16 March 1972.

A complete list of the members and portfolios of this ministry has not yet been located in a reliably digitised official source.

== See also ==
- Government of Rajasthan
- Chief Minister of Rajasthan
- Rajasthan Legislative Assembly
