= Jagat Narain =

Jagat Narain may refer to:

- Lala Jagat Narain (1899–1981), Indian editor and politician
- Jagat Narain Mulla (1864–1938), prominent lawyer and public prosecutor in British India
- Jagat Narain Lal (1894–1966), Indian writer and freedom fighter

== See also ==
- Jagat (disambiguation)
- Jagat Narain Lal College
