= Maru-Gurjara architecture =

Style of north Indian temple architecture

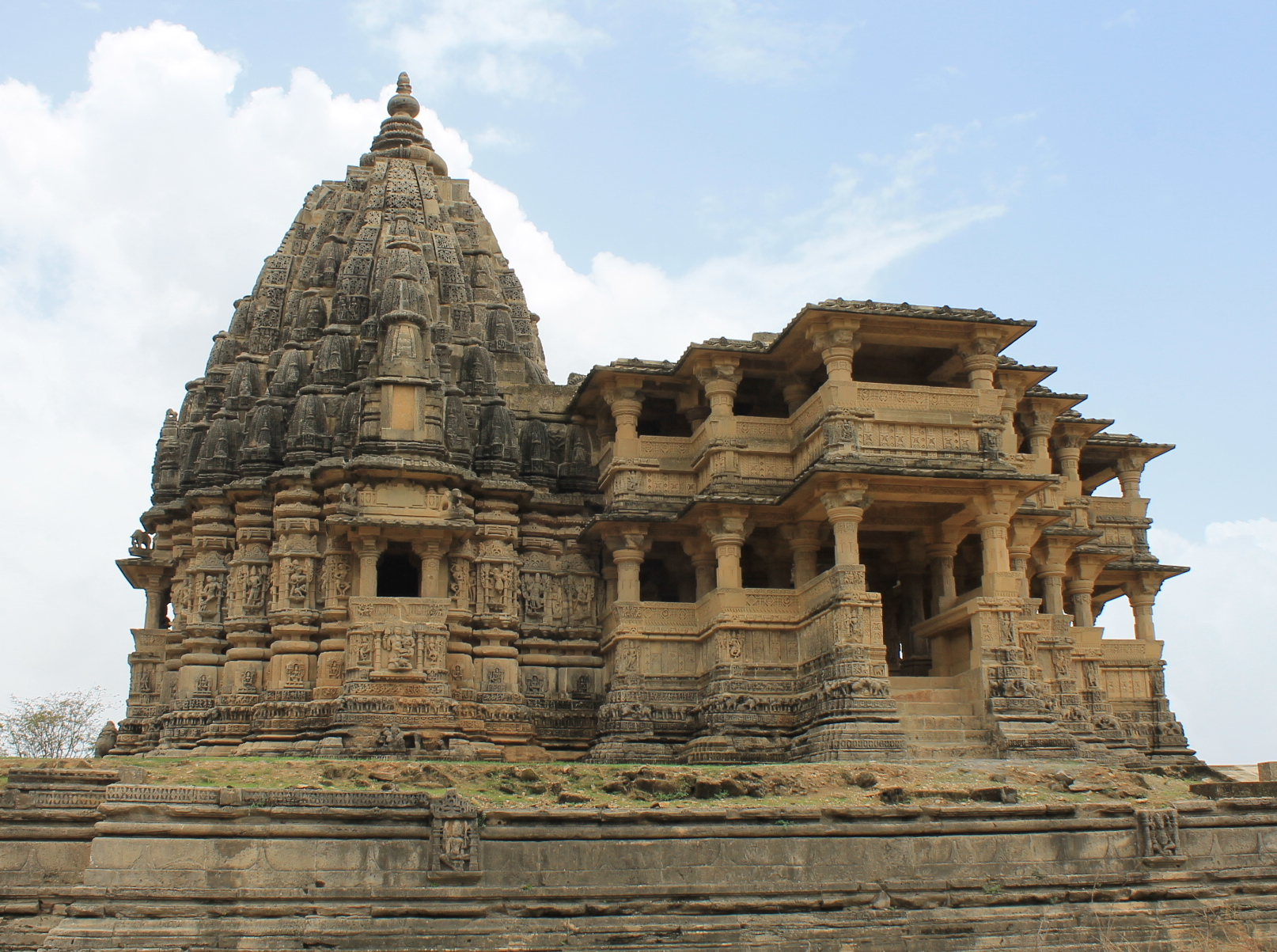
Navlakha Temple, Ghumli, Gujarat, 12th century

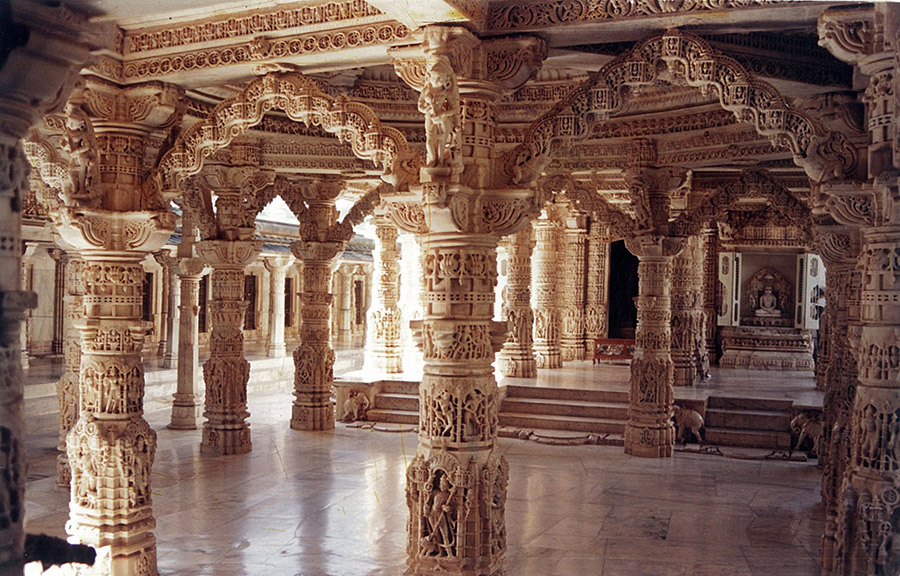
Interior of Jain Luna Vasahi temple at Dilwara, Mount Abu, 1230 and later, with typical "flying arches".

Māru-Gurjara architecture or Solaṅkī style, is the style of West Indian temple architecture that originated in Gujarat and Rajasthan from the 11th to 13th centuries, under the Chaulukya dynasty (also called Solaṅkī dynasty). Although originating as a regional style in Hindu temple architecture, it became especially popular in Jain temples, and mainly under Jain patronage later spread across India, then later to diaspora communities around the world.

On the exteriors, the style of Māru-Gurjara architecture is distinguished from other North Indian temple styles of the period in "that the external walls of the temples have been structured by increasing numbers of projections and recesses, accommodating sharply carved statues in niches. These are normally positioned in superimposed registers, above the lower bands of moldings. The latter display continuous lines of horse riders, elephants, and kīrttimukhas. Hardly any segment of the surface is left unadorned." The main shikhara tower usually has many urushringa subsidiary spirelets on it, and two smaller side-entrances with porches are common in larger temples.

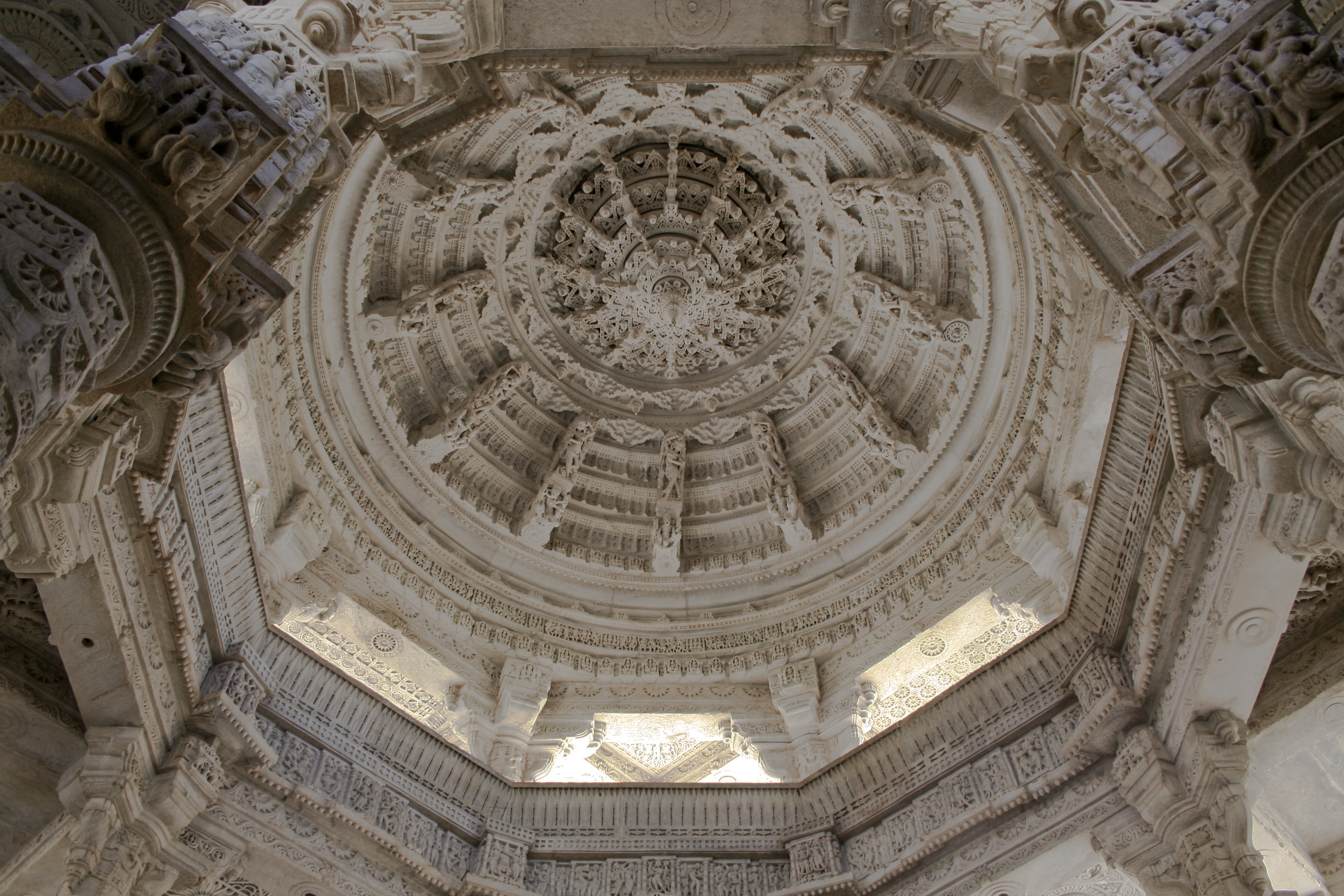
Mandapa ceiling in the Ranakpur Jain Temple

Interiors are if anything even more lavishly decorated, with elaborate carving on most surfaces. In particular, Jain temples often have small low domes carved on the inside with a highly intricate rosette design. Another distinctive feature is "flying" arch-like elements between pillars, touching the horizontal beam above in the centre, and elaborately carved. These have no structural function, and are purely decorative. The style developed large pillared halls, many open at the sides, with Jain temples often having one closed and two pillared halls in sequence on the main axis leading to the shrine.

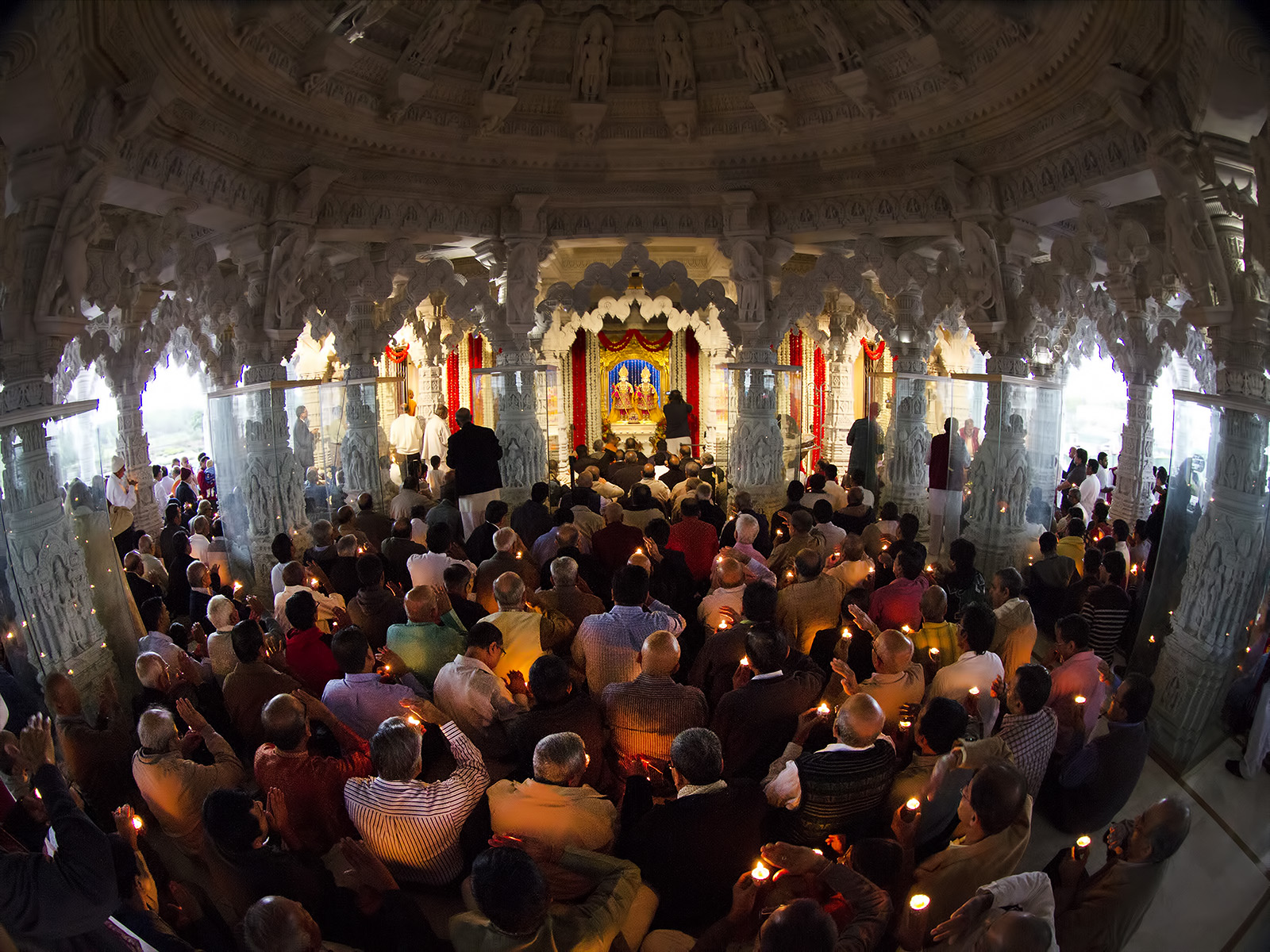
Devotions in the Swaminarayan temple in Houston, Texas (2004)

The style mostly fell from use in Hindu temples in its original regions by the 13th century, especially as the area had fallen to the Muslim Delhi Sultanate by 1298. But, unusually for an Indian temple style, it continued to be used by Jains there and elsewhere, with a notable "revival" in the 15th century. Since then it has continued in use in Jain and some Hindu temples, and from the 20th century has spread to temples built outside India. These include many large temples built by the Hindu Swaminarayan tradition, with the Neasden temple in London (1995) an early example, and smaller ones built by the Jain diaspora, such as the Jain temple, Antwerp, Belgium (completed 2010), and temples in Potters Bar and Leicester in England.

== Origin of the name ==
The name of the Māru-Gurjara style is a 20th-century invention; previously, and still by many, it is called the "Solanki style". The ancient name of Rajasthan was Marudesh while Gujarat was called Gurjaratra. The term "Māru-Gurjara" was coined by art and architectural historian Madhusudan Dhaky, who also coined the terms "Surāṣṭra", "Mahā-Māru", and "Mahā-Gurjara" to describe other historical styles of Western Indian architecture. The Māru-Gurjara style is a synthesis of the Mahā-Māru style of Marwar region in Rajasthan and the Mahā-Gurjara style of Gujarat. However, Hegewald suggests "This change in terminology appears to have been suggested first by A. Ghosh during a symposium in Delhi in 1967". She notes that the change was an "attempt to avoid dynastic terms", and that both "Māru-Gurjara" and "Maru-Gurjara" are used by different writers, and that the Jain community mostly continues to call the style "Solanki".

== Development ==
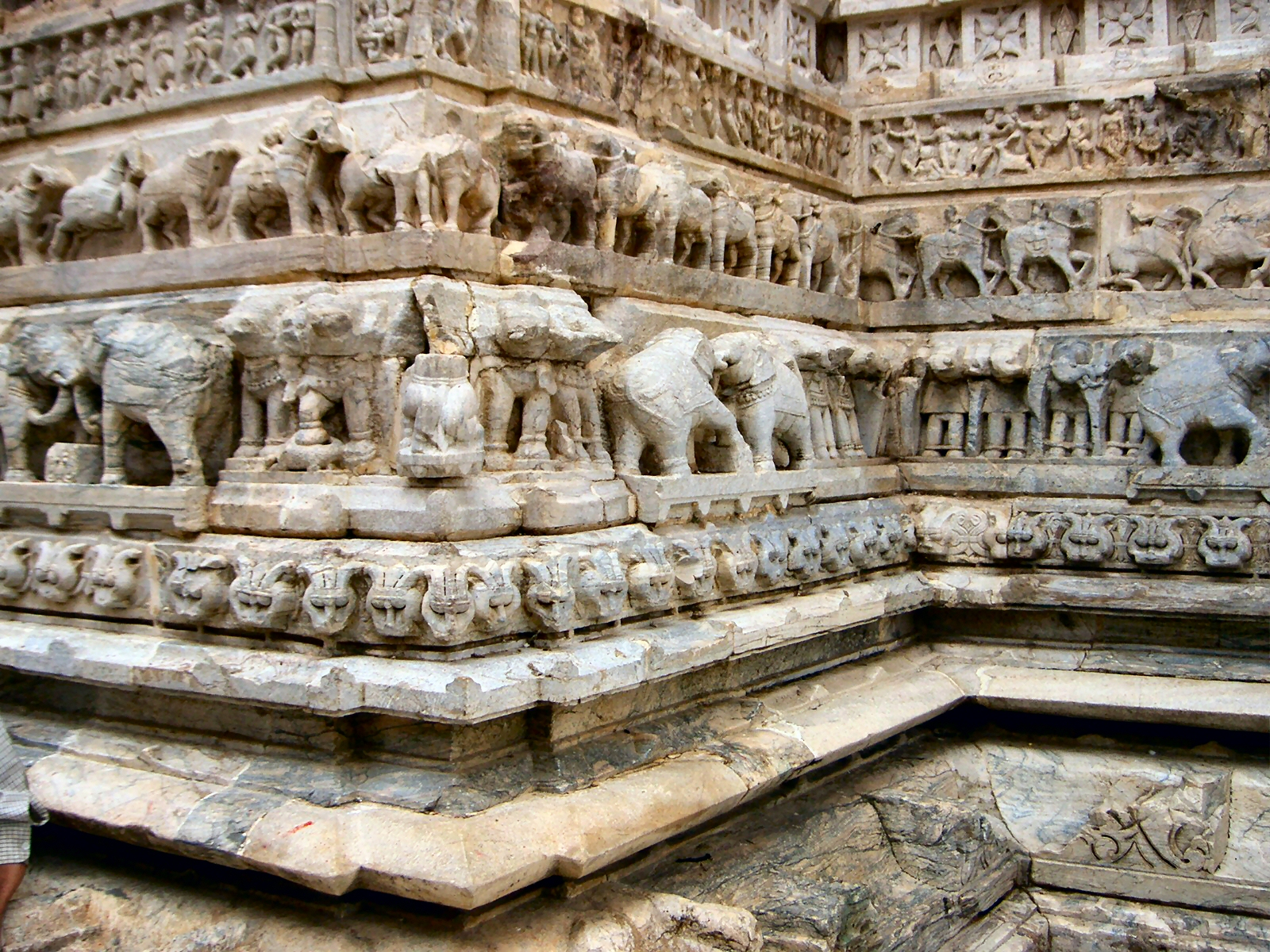
Bands of relief on the base wall of the Jagdish Temple, Udaipur, built by Maharana Jagat Singh I in 1651

The style developed from that of the dynasties preceding the Solankis, mainly the Gurjara-Pratihara dynasty, and the local dynasties under it. The most famous monuments of this period are the Khajuraho Group of Monuments built under the Chandela dynasty between 950 and 1050. These are famous for their erotic reliefs. Many of the broad features of this earlier style are continued in the Māru-Gurjara style. The beginnings of the new style can be seen in the small Ambika Mata temple in Jagat, Rajasthan. The earliest inscription here records a repair in 961 (well before the Solankis came to power). For George Mitchell, in the Jagat temple (and others he names) "the Pratihara style was fully evolved in its Western Indian expression".

=== Early Hindu temples ===
The Somnath temple, dedicated to Shiva, was the most famous in Gujarat, but was largely destroyed by the Ghaznavid ruler Mahmud in a raid in 1024–1025 CE. It was then rebuilt, but sacked again when the Delhi Sultanate conquered the area at the end of the 13th century. The ruins have recently been restored and rebuilt in what is intended as the Solanki style.

The Sun Temple, Modhera, Gujarat, was built in 1026–27 CE, just after Mahmud's raid. The shikhara is now missing, but the lower levels are well-preserved, and there is a large stepwell tank of the same period in front of the temple. There is a large detached mandapa between the main sanctuary building and the tank, which is slightly later. The carving of all parts is "extremely luxuriant and exquisitely refined in the rendering of detail".

The Rudra Mahalaya Temple was a large complex in Siddhpur Gujarat, mostly destroyed under Muslim rule. The main temple was surrounded by a screen of subsidiary shrines (partly surviving as a mosque), and the porches, parts of which remain, and a stand-alone torana were exceptionally grand. The mandapa had three storeys. It was completed in 1140, ending a long period of construction. Two groups of smaller ruined temples of similar date are the two Rama Lakshamana temples, Baradia and the five Kiradu temples; both have their lowest storeys fairly intact, and some of the Kiradu group retain part of their shikharas.

The Rani ki vav ("Queen's Stepwell", probably 1063–83) is a very grand stepwell in Patan, Gujarat, once the Chaulukya capital. With a very different architectural form and function, "throughout, the ornamentation of the architectural elements is sumptuous" in the contemporary temple style, including very many Hindu figures. Another non-temple example is the 80 foot Kirti Stambha tower in Chittor Fort, Rajasthan, built for a Jain merchant, mostly in the early 13th century, with the pavilion at the top a 15th-century restoration.

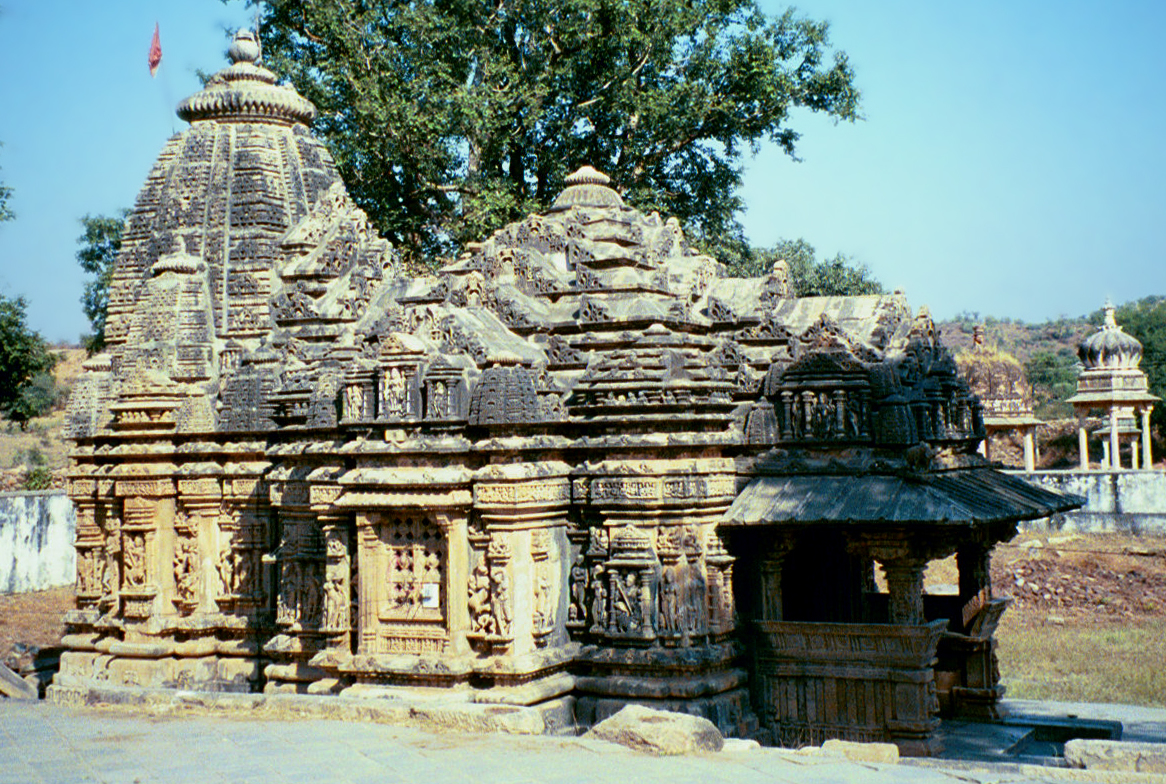
Ambika Mata temple in Jagat, Rajasthan, by 960

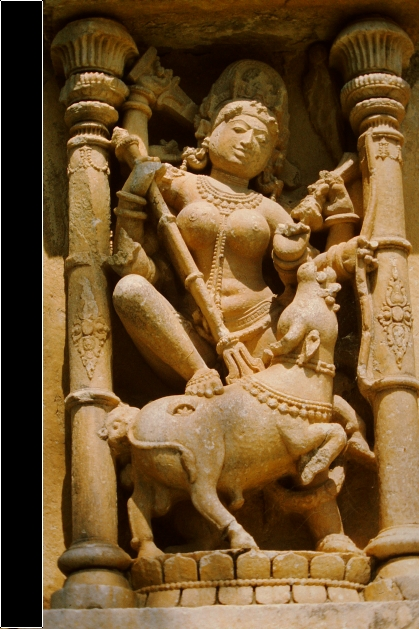
Durga on the Jagat temple

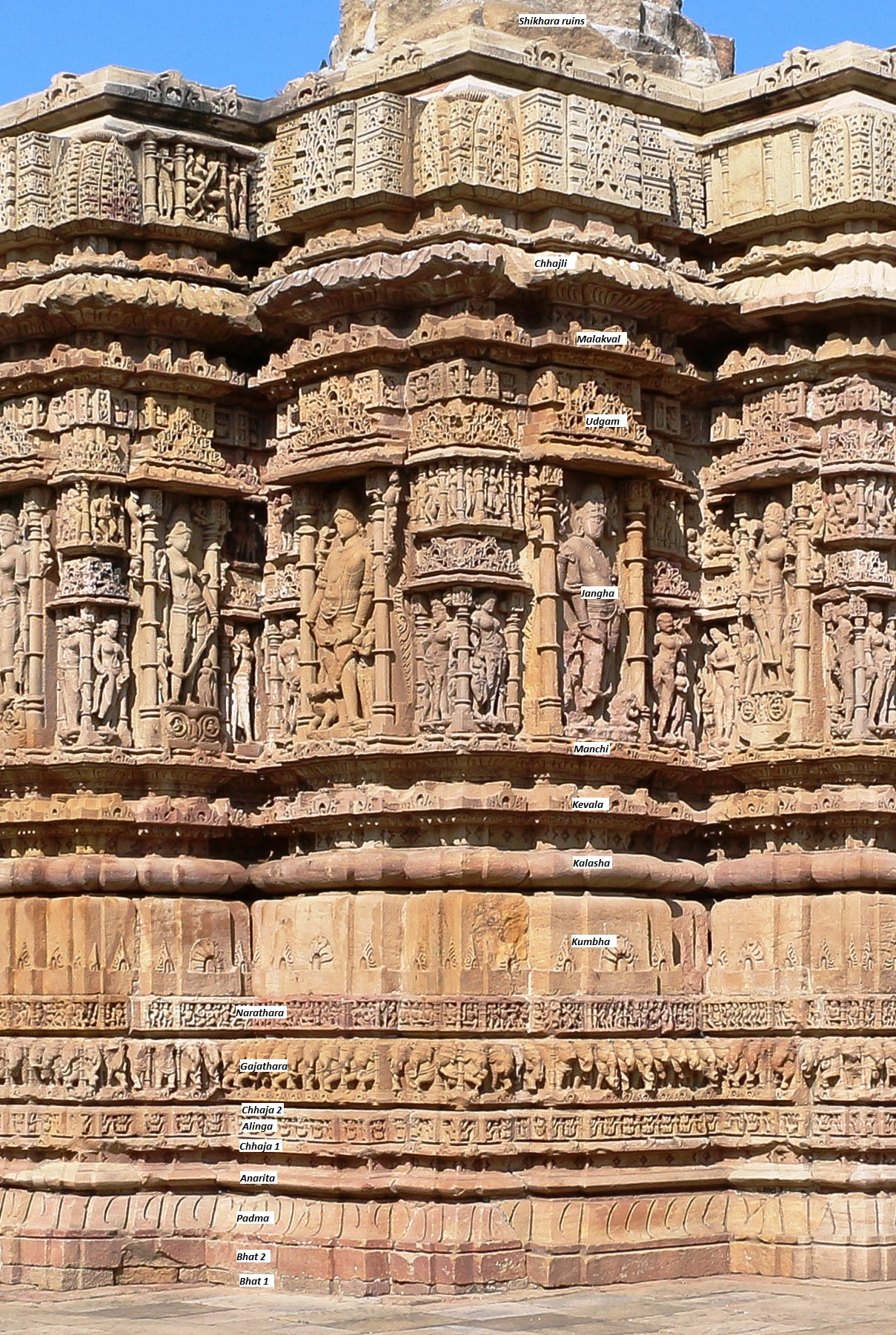
Wall below the shikhara, Sun Temple, Modhera, 1020s

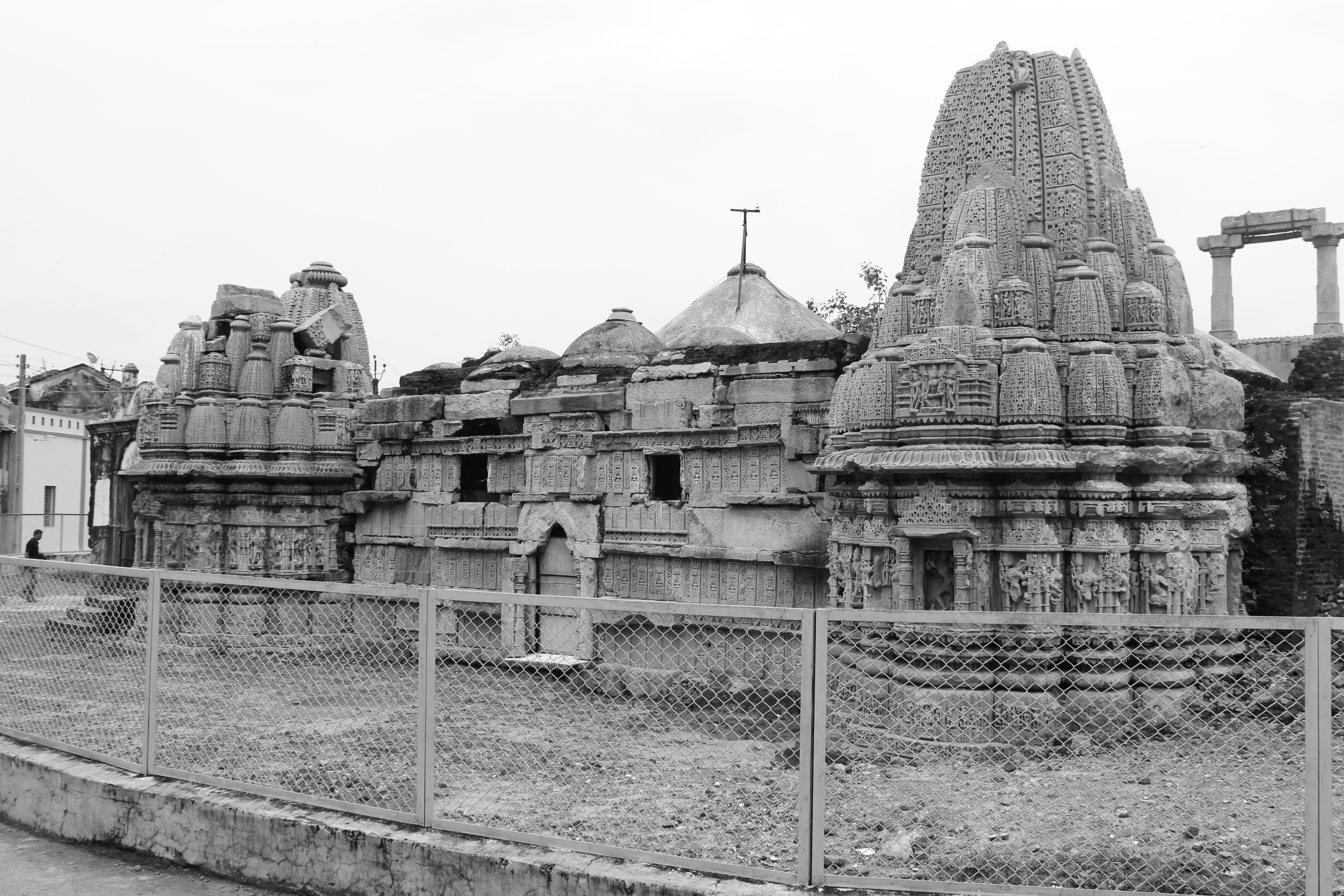
Outside face of screen shrines at Rudra Mahalaya Temple, by 1140

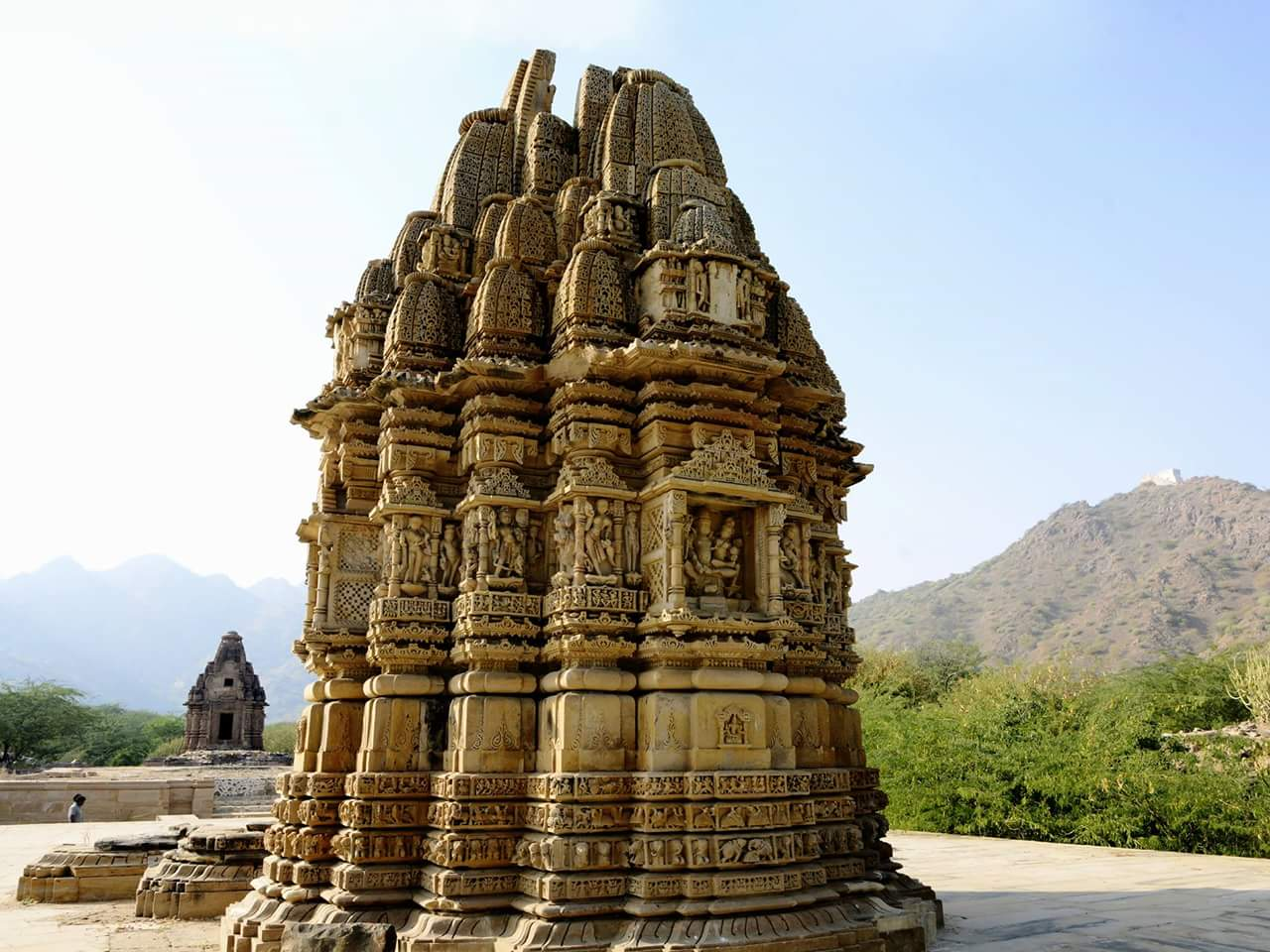
Kiradu temples

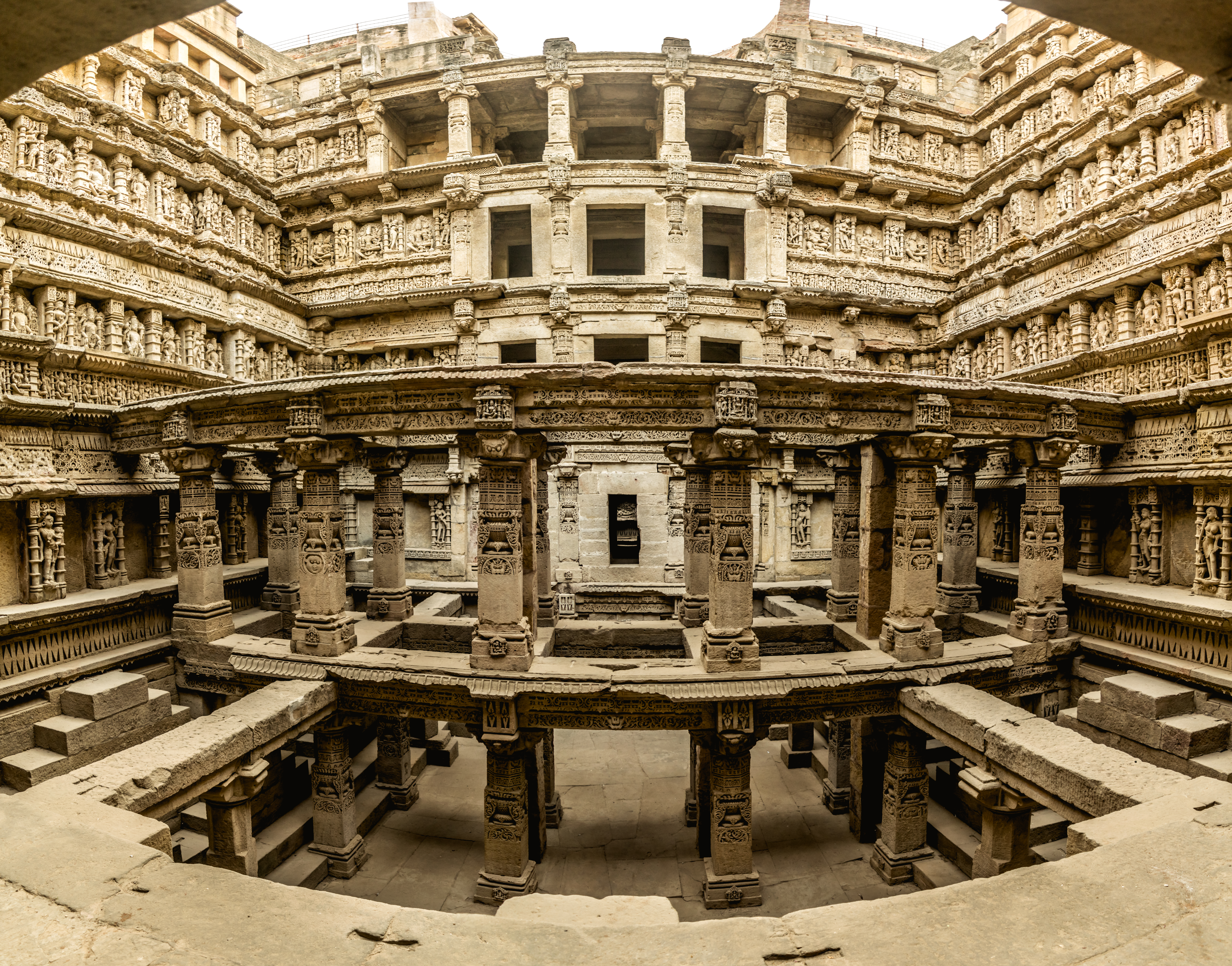
Rani ki vav, Patan, Gujarat, 11th century

=== Early Jain temples ===
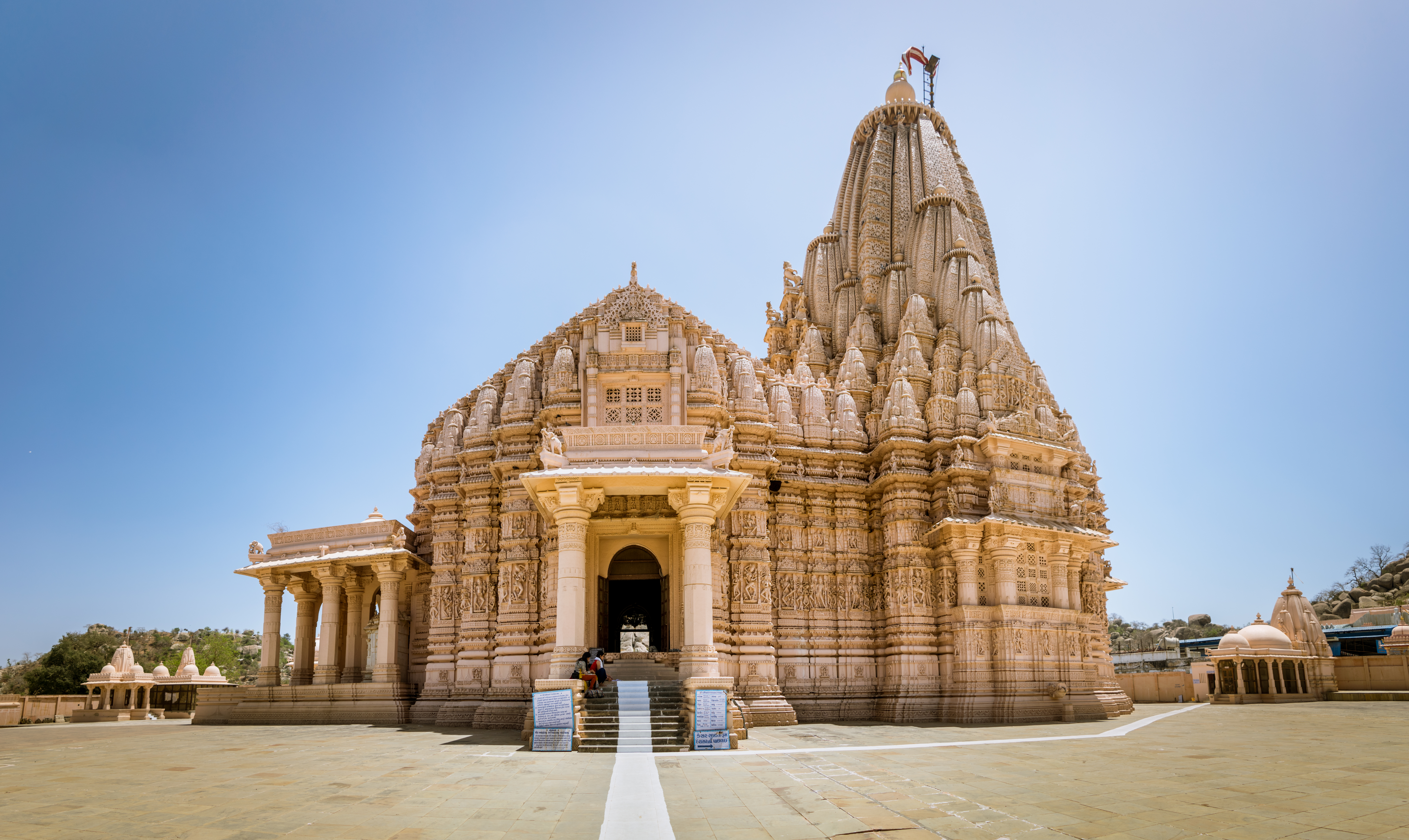
Ajitanatha Temple, Taranga, 1161

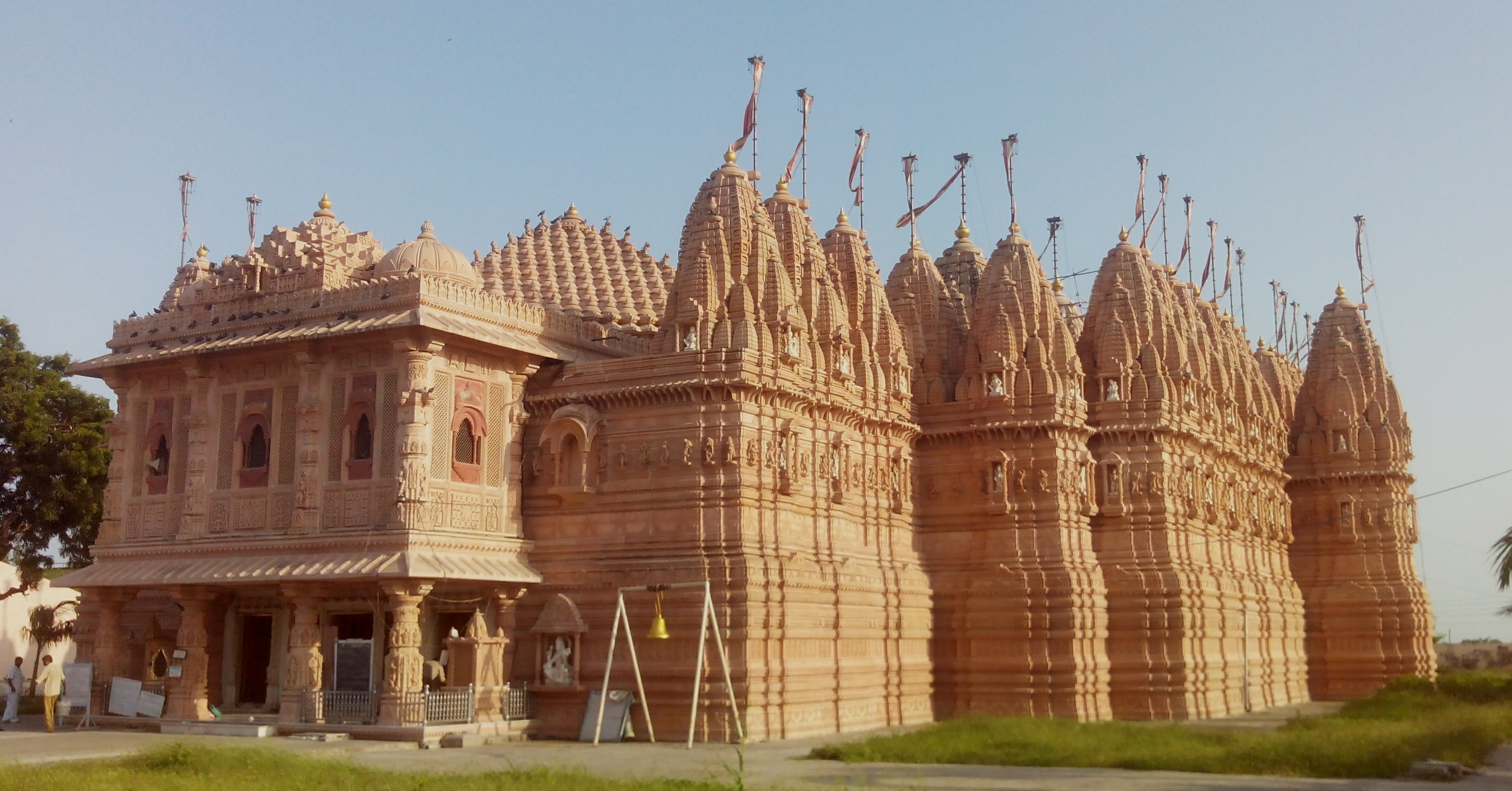
Bhadreshwar Jain Temple, 1248, rebuilt 2010

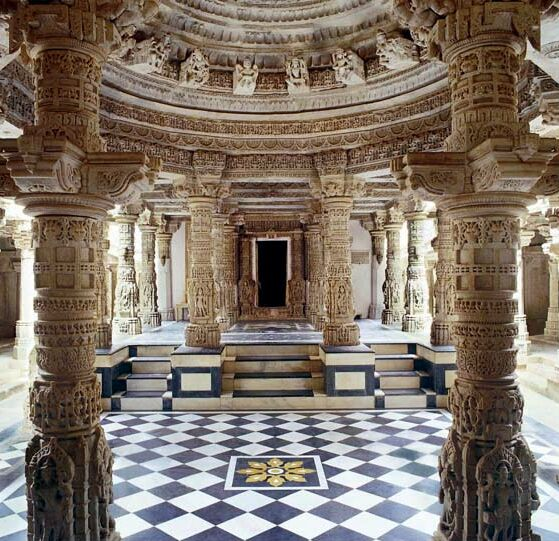
Vimal Vasahi, Dilwara temples, 1031

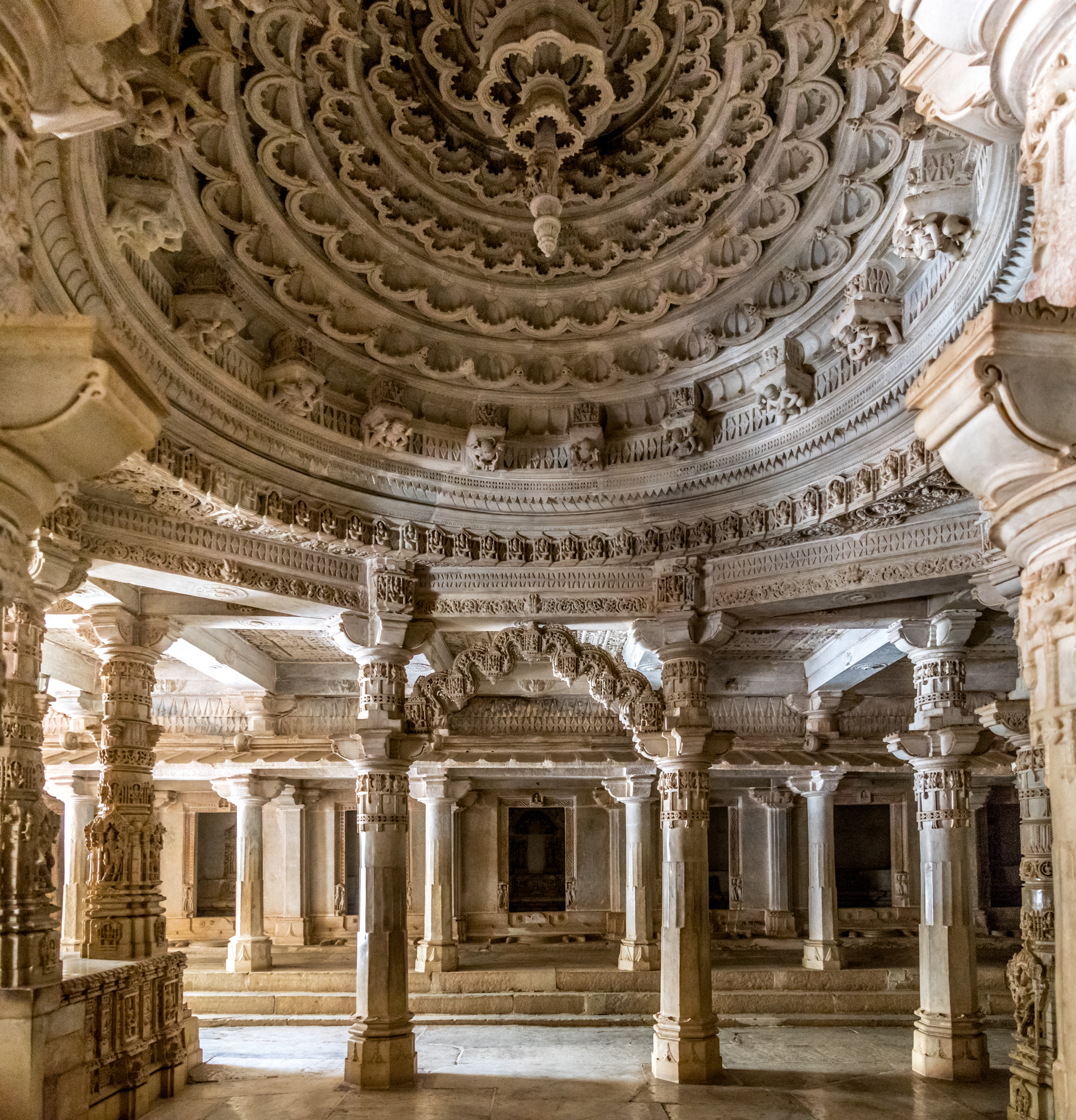
Kumbharia Mahavira temple, 1062

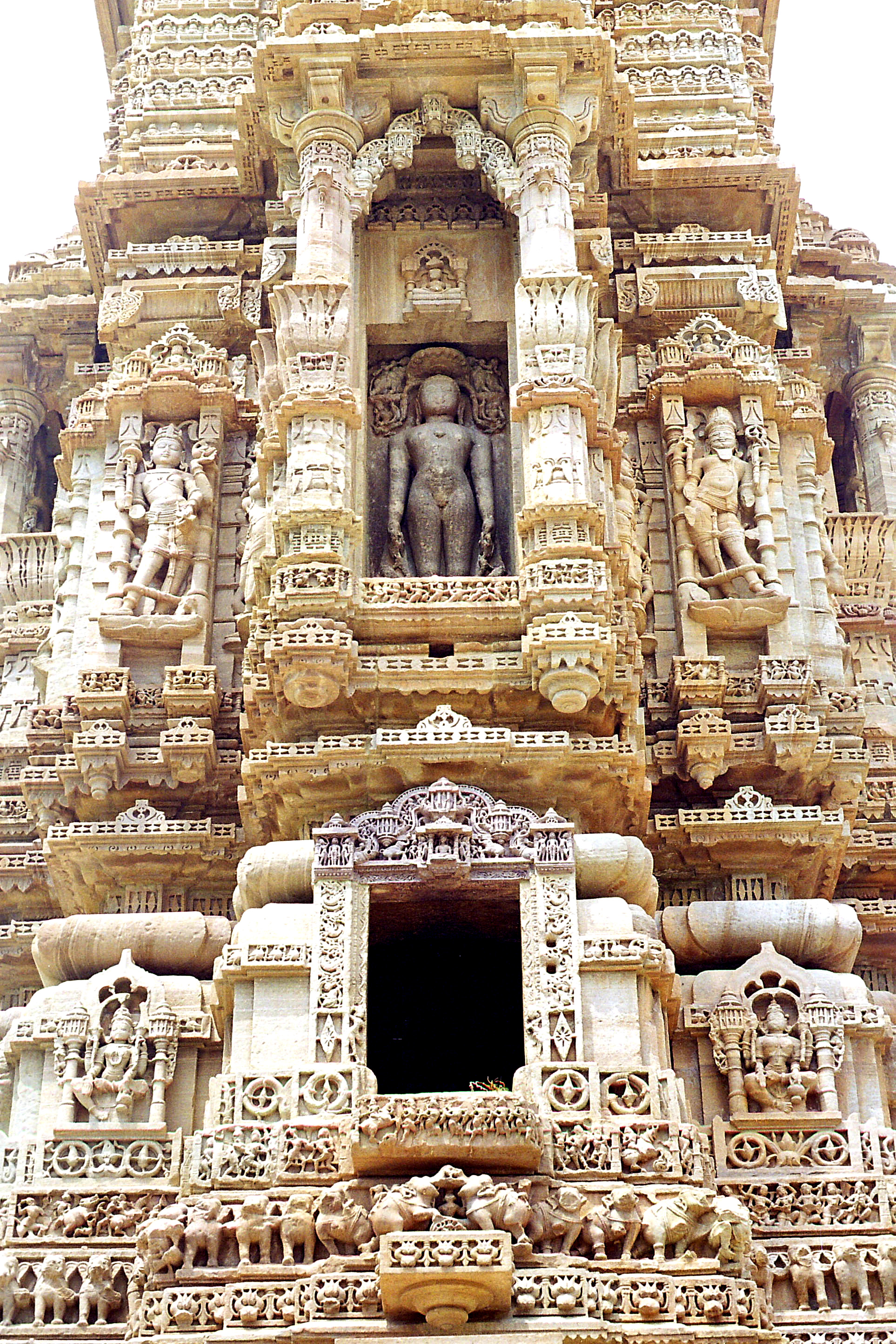
Detail of the Jain Kirti Stambha tower, Chittor Fort

The five Dilwara Temples on Mount Abu are among the most famous Jain temples. The Vimal Vasahi is much the earliest, constructed by 1031, with the Luna Vasahi by 1230, and the others at intervals between 1459 and 1582. All are in a very white marble that adds greatly to their effect, and remain in use. The oldest and largest two have large amounts of intricate carving even by the standards of the style, reaching a peak in the Luna Vasahi temple. The main buildings of the first three named are surrounded by "cloister" screens of devakulikā shrines, and are fairly plain on the outer walls of these; in the case of the Vimal Vasahi this screen was a later addition, around the time of the second temple. These three have an axis from the sanctuary through a closed, then an open mandapa to an open rangamandapa, or larger hall for dance or drama. Surrounding the main temple with a curtain of shrines was to become a distinctive feature of the Jain temples of West India, still employed in some modern temples.

The Ajitanatha Temple, the largest and earliest of the cluster of Taranga Jain temples, was constructed in 1161, and is a fine example of the style, which remains largely intact, and in religious use. The shikhara and the much lower superstructure over the mandapa are both among the "most complicated" in the style. The former begins with three rows of bhumija-style miniature towers in clusters, before turning to the sekhari style higher up, where the miniature towers are of varying lengths, and overlap. Over the mandapa, the lowest level continues the regular miniature tower clusters over the sanctuary, above which shallow pitched planes of roof are studded with miniature towers, with rows of beasts and urns along the edges of the planes. The surfaces are heavily decorated with figures and "honeycomb" gavaksha decoration, the figures "characterized by lively poses and sharply cut faces and costumes".

The Ajitanatha Temple was built under, and very probably by, King Kumarapala (r. 1143 – 1172 CE) of the Solanki/Chaulukya dynasty, who was the most favourable towards Jains of the dynasty. According to Jain sources he converted to Jainism towards the end of his life; at the least he was influenced by the religion. His reign marked the height of Jain power and influence; his son Ajayapala, something of a villain in Jain chronicles, was much less favourable, although there continued to be Jain ministers.

Kumbharia Jain temples is a complex of five Jain temples in Kumbhariya, Banaskantha district built between 1062 - 1231 CE. The five temples are famous for their elaborate architecture. The Jain temples, Kumbhariya along with Dilwara temples, Girnar Jain temples and Taranga Jain temple are considered excellent examples of Chaulukyan architecture. Mahavira, Shantinatha, and Parshvanatha temples are some of the most renowned temples in India. These five marble temples vary in size and architecture details, but every temple is surrounded by a protective walled courtyard with elaborate arched gateways.

The Bhadreshwar Jain Temple, mostly constructed for a merchant in 1248, just at the end of the Solanki dynasty, is surrounded by the high walls of a curtain of subsidiary shrines, each with a shikhara in sekhari style, except for a much later two-storey porch at the entrance, which has elements from Indo-Islamic architecture in the domes and arches. The main temple, in a courtyard considerably above ground level, is comparable to the earlier examples described above.

The clustered group of Girnar Jain temples, with a magnificent mountain-top position, are mostly in the style, with the major temples ranging in date (of basic construction) from 1128, 1231, 1453 and another 15th century example. Other temples, like the large example at the Rajgadhi Timbo ("mound"), have been completely destroyed.

=== Later temples ===
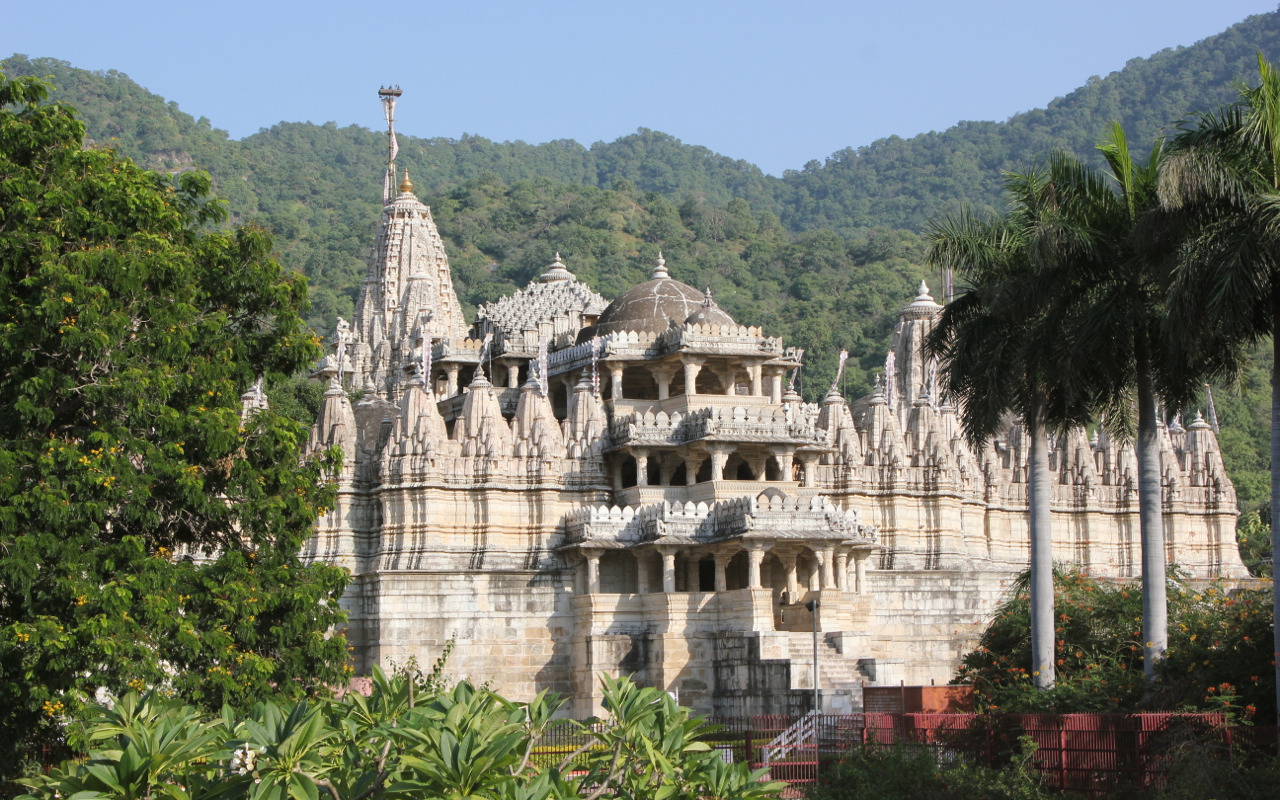
Ranakpur Jain temple, 15th century

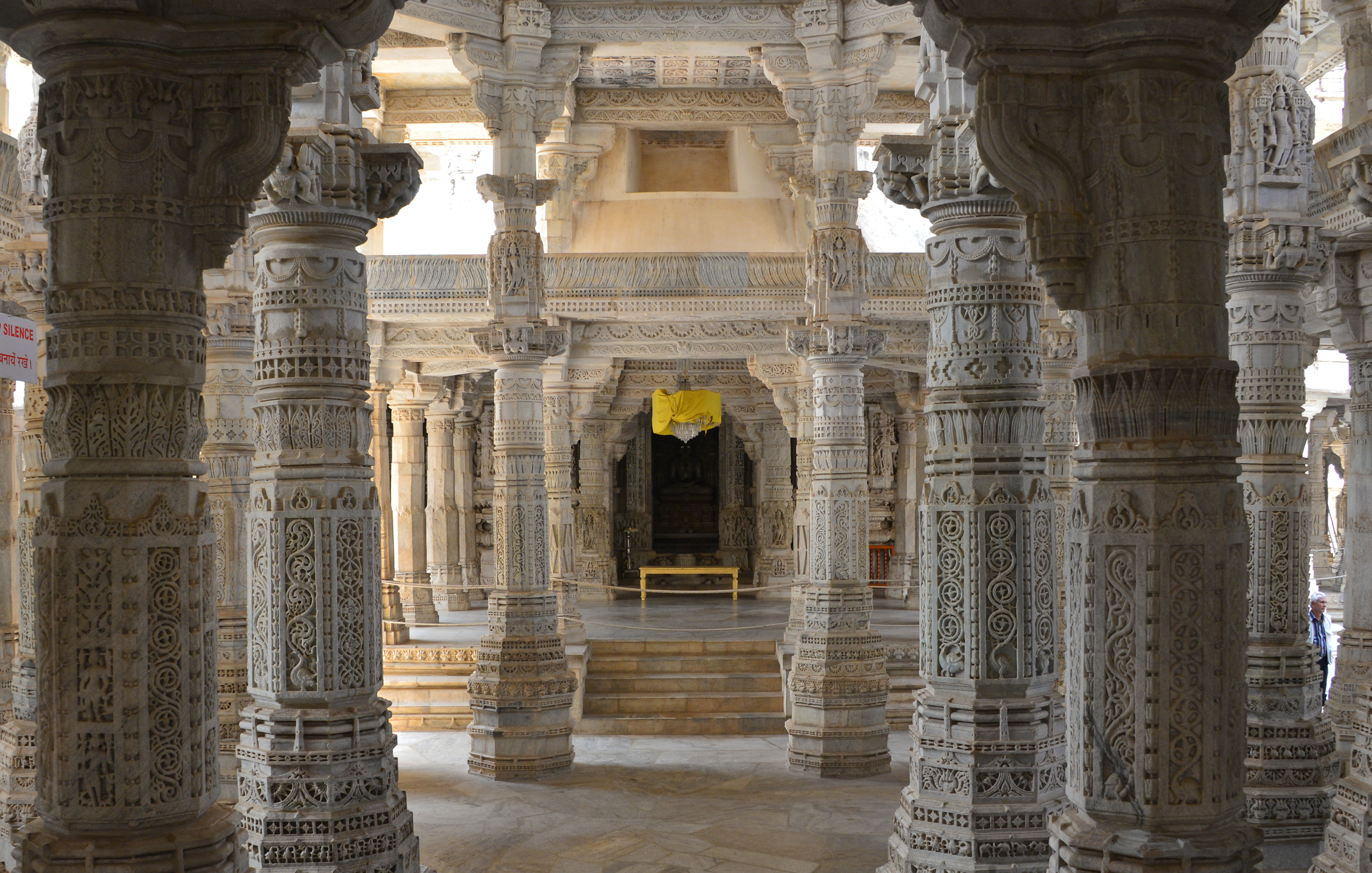
Detailed carvings on the pillar of Ranakpur Jain temple

The Solanki dynasty finally fell around 1244, replaced by the Hindu Vaghela dynasty for some decades before the Muslim Delhi Sultanate conquered the region. Temple building then largely ceased in the original areas of the style for a considerable time, although a trickle of repairs and additions to existing temples are recorded, and some small new buildings. However, Solanki rule came to be seen by Jains as something of a "golden age", and the Māru-Gurjara style evidently became something of a standard for Jains, specifically the Śvetāmbara wing of the religion. The style began to re-appear in Jain temples in the same area in the 15th century, and then spread elsewhere in India, initially moving eastwards.

The Adinatha Ranakpur Jain temple in Rajasthan is a major construction for a merchant, built between 1439 and 1458 or 1496. It is a thorough-going, but not strict, revival of Māru-Gurjara style, on the same broad model as Bhadreshwar, with a high outside wall of the back of shrines, but also a number of Islamic-style corbelled domes. There are four three-storey porches, already up two flights of steps. The interior of the temple is "unsurpassed for its spatial complexity", with the sanctuary at the centre of the compound surrounded by many mandapas of two or three storeys, with all levels very open between the supporting columns allowing views in several directions inside the compound. Even the shikhara has balconies at three levels. The carving on the interior is in most areas as lavish as ever.

The large group of Palitana temples on the Shatrunjaya hills in Gujarat are another very important Jain pilgrimage site, with temples numbering into the hundreds (most very small, and all but one Svetambara). Though many were founded much earlier, the site was so thoroughly destroyed by Muslim armies, starting in 1311, that there is little surviving that dates back before the 16th century. The temples are packed tightly together in a number of high-walled compounds called "tuks" or "tonks". Michell calls them "characteristic of the final phase of Western Indian temple architecture", with traditional shikharas, double storey porches, often on three or four sides, and miniature-urn roofs to the main mandapas. But there are influences from Indo-Islamic architecture in the domes, often fluted, over porches and second mandapas, "arches with petalled fringes, parapets of merlons", and other features. The Polo Forest in Gujarat has groups of Hindu and Jain ruined temples of various dates, but mostly 15th century.

The Jagdish Temple, Udaipur (completed 1651) is an example of a Hindu temple using the style at a late date; in this case a commission of Jagat Singh I, ruler of Mewar.

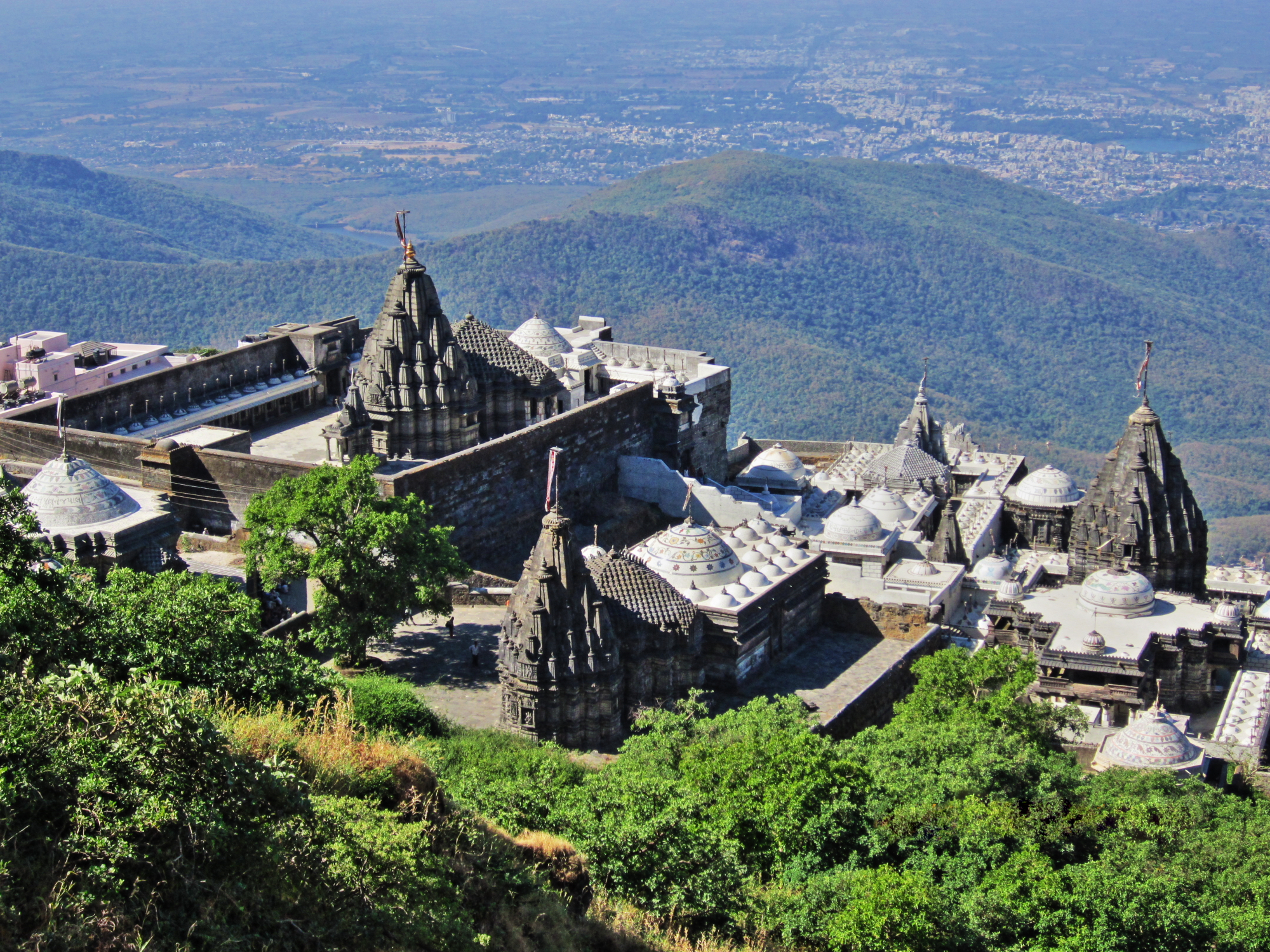
Seven of the Girnar Jain temples, 12th-15th centuries

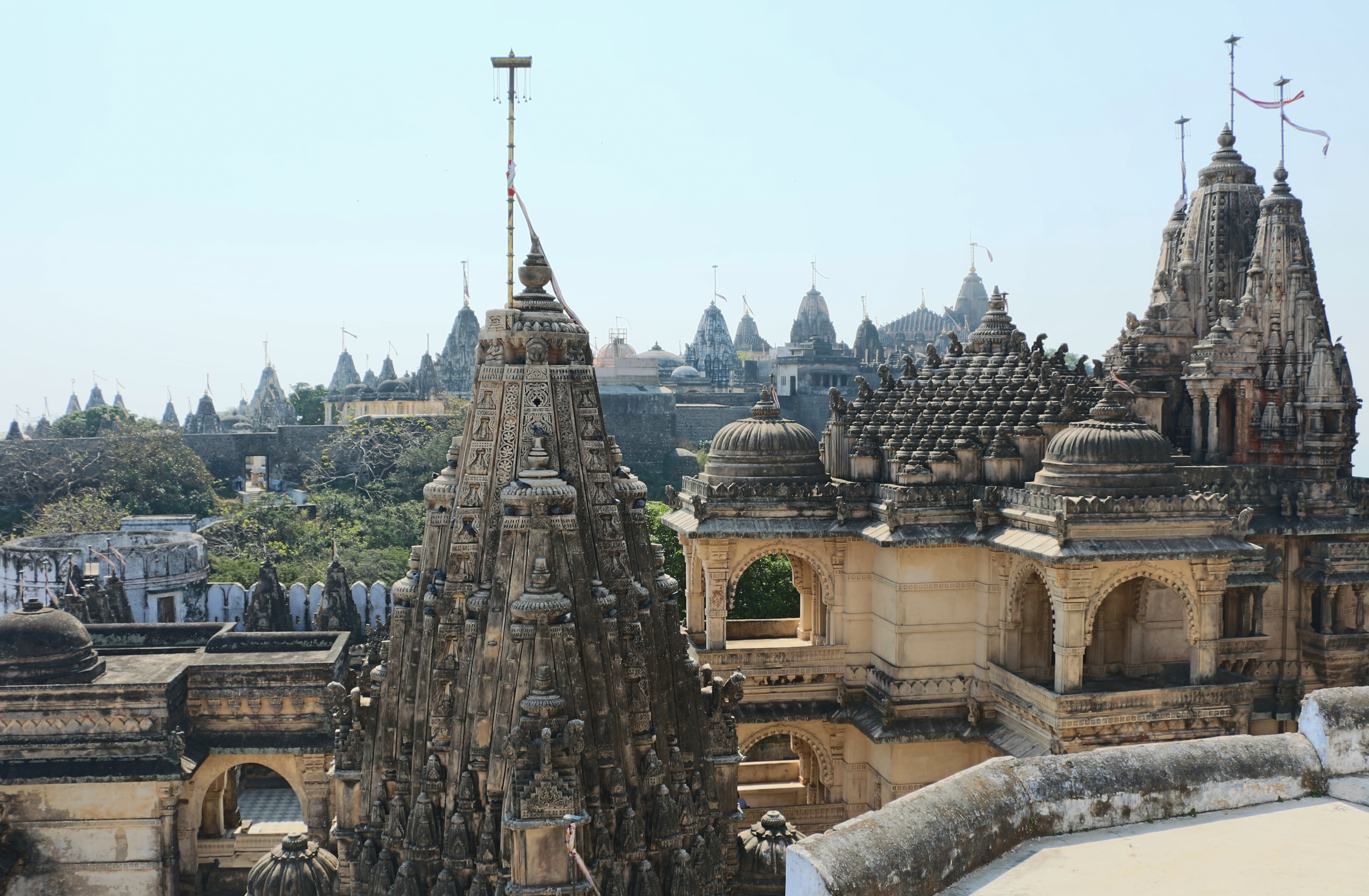
View across the Palitana temples

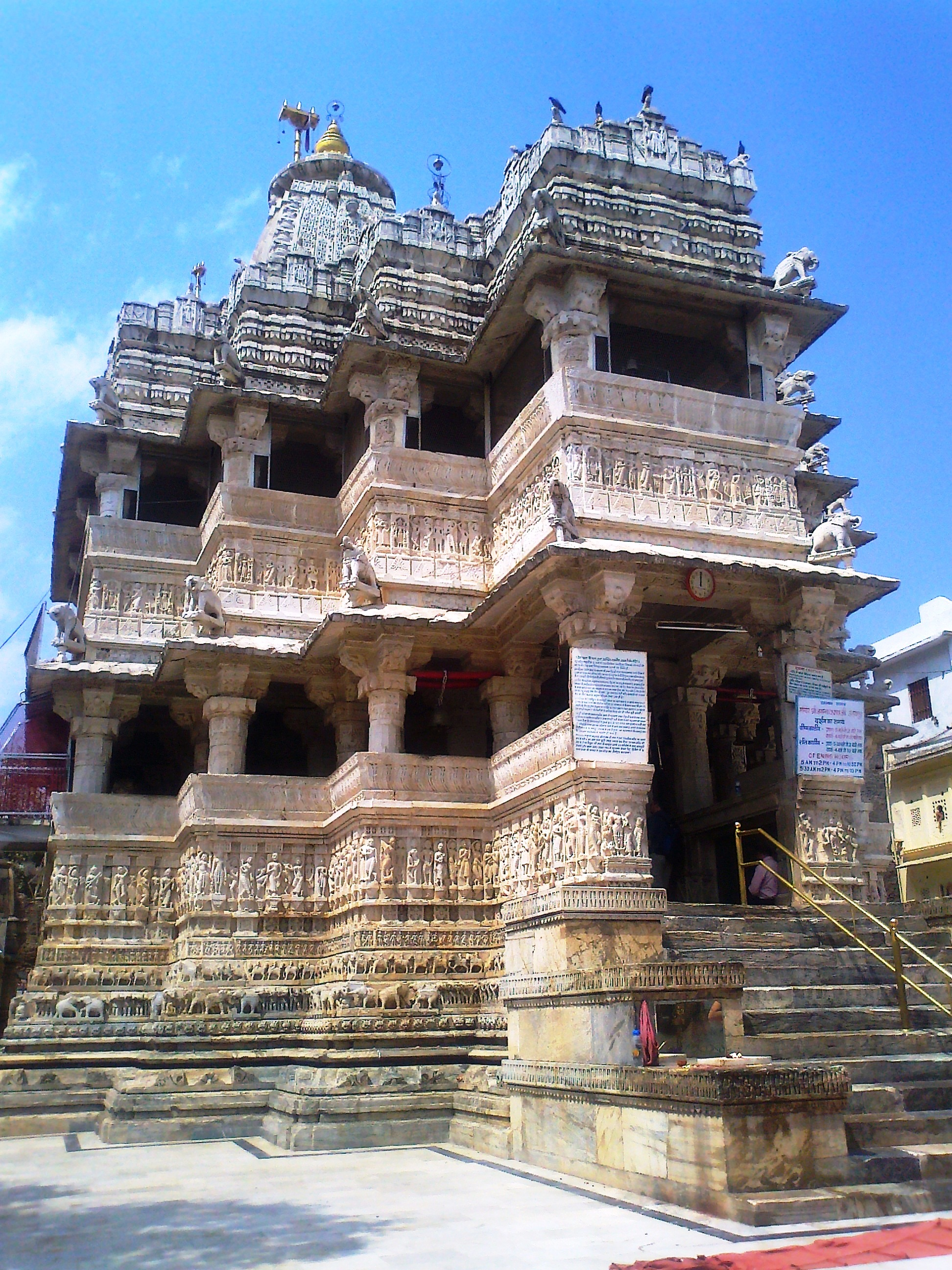
The Hindu Jagdish Temple, Udaipur (completed 1651)

==== 19th century ====
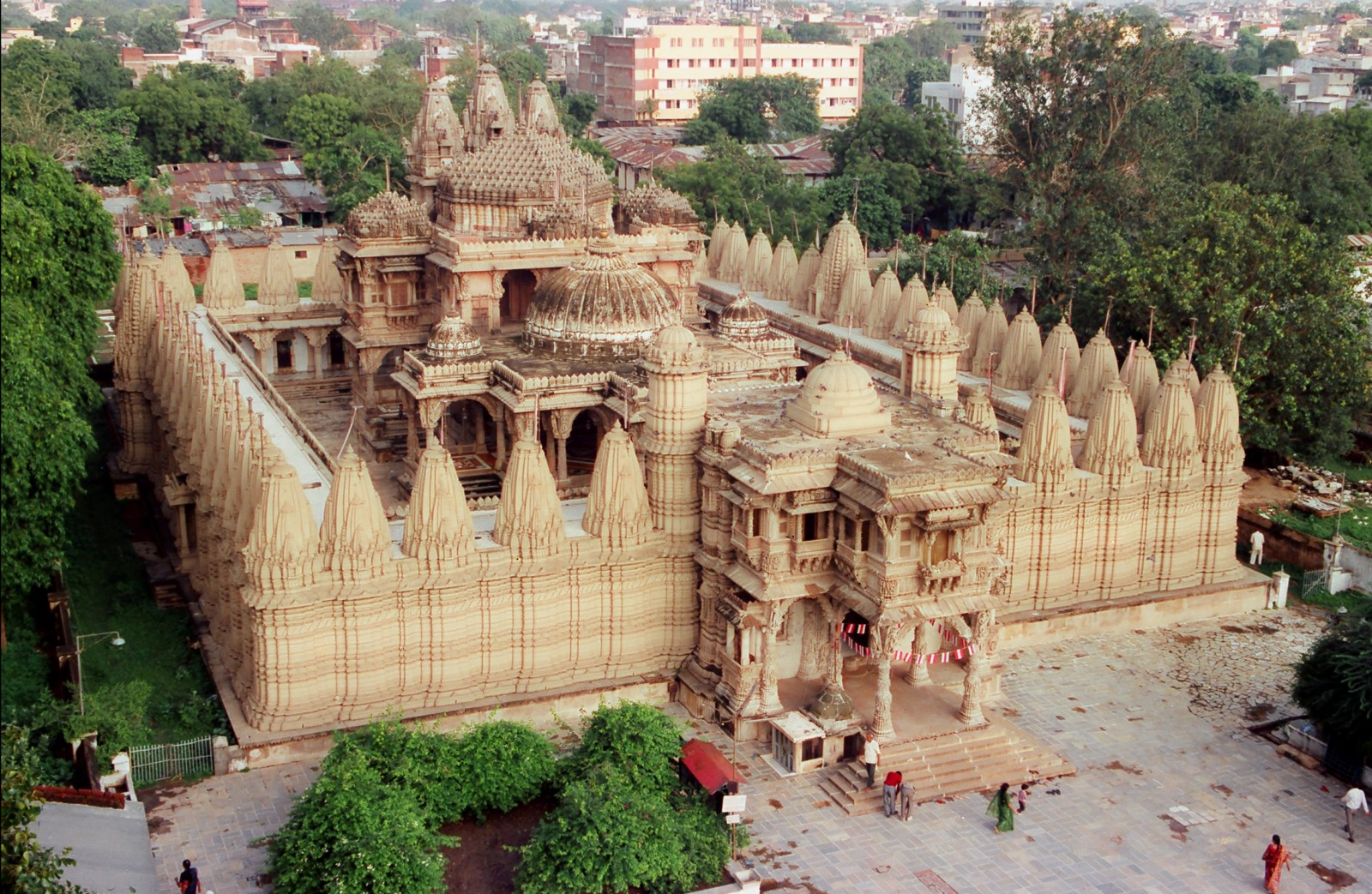
Hutheesing Jain Temple (1848) in Ahmedabad, Gujarat

There was a considerable number of new Jain temples in the 19th century, as the Jain community continued to grow and prosper. Temples were built by wealthy Jains, often individually, or by community trusts. The large Hutheesing Jain Temple (1848) in Ahmedabad, Gujarat, was built by the Hutheesing family. It uses the Māru-Gurjara style, with many similarities to Bhadreshwar and Ranakpur. There is a good deal of "sharply sculpted" decoration, "but figures appear only at the brackets". There are three sanctuaries in a row, and so three shikharas, but the porch and the outer mandapa each have three domes.

But the style is not invariably used: the large Ajmer Jain temple (1864–1895) in Rajasthan uses a kind of Neo-Mughal style. This is a Digambar foundation, and the Digambar wing of Jainism always favoured the Māru-Gurjara style rather less, at least in India itself. The large Anandji Kalyanji Trust, which devotes itself to temple-building and renovation, has played a role in promoting the Māru-Gurjara style, at Palitana in particular.

==== 20th century ====
The 20th and 21st centuries, especially from about 1950, have seen increasing Jain diaspora communities in many parts of the world. In India there has been much construction of large temples and complexes, and the smaller diaspora communities have constructed buildings on a somewhat smaller scale. In both cases use of the Māru-Gurjara style is very common, although the thoroughness with which it is adopted varies greatly. Some buildings mix Māru-Gurjara elements with those of local temple styles and modern international ones. Generally, where there is elaborate carving, often still done by craftsmen from Gujarat or Rajasthan, this has more ornamental and decorative work than small figures. A similar mix is seen in many modern Hindu temples in India and abroad, for example those of the Swaminarayan sect, or the Prem Mandir, Vrindavan near Mathura (built 2001-2011). Sometimes the Māru-Gurjara influence is limited to the "flying arches" and mandapa ceiling rosettes, and a preference for white marble.

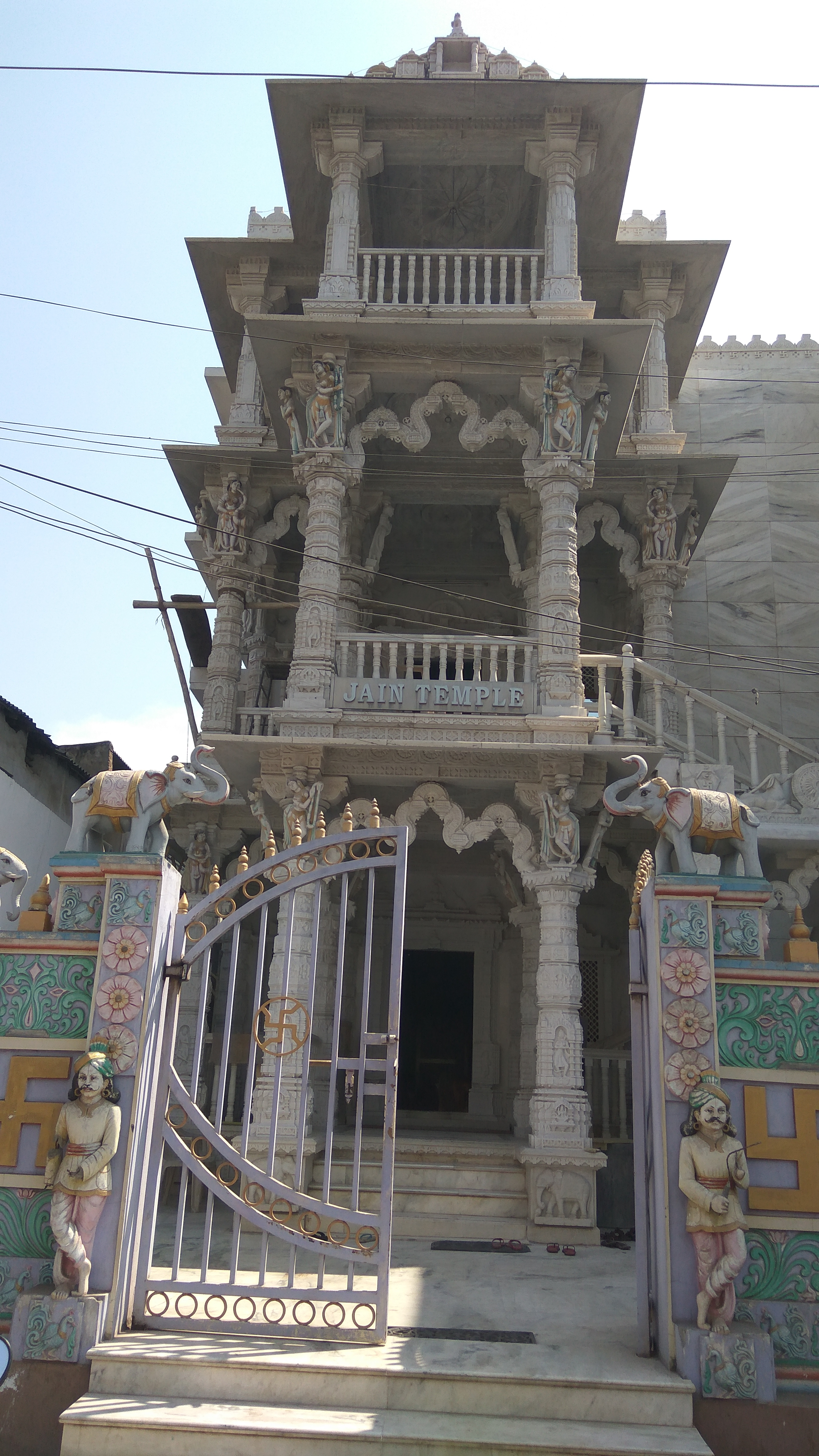
Entrance fronting an essentially modern Jain temple building, Kakinada, Andhra Pradesh

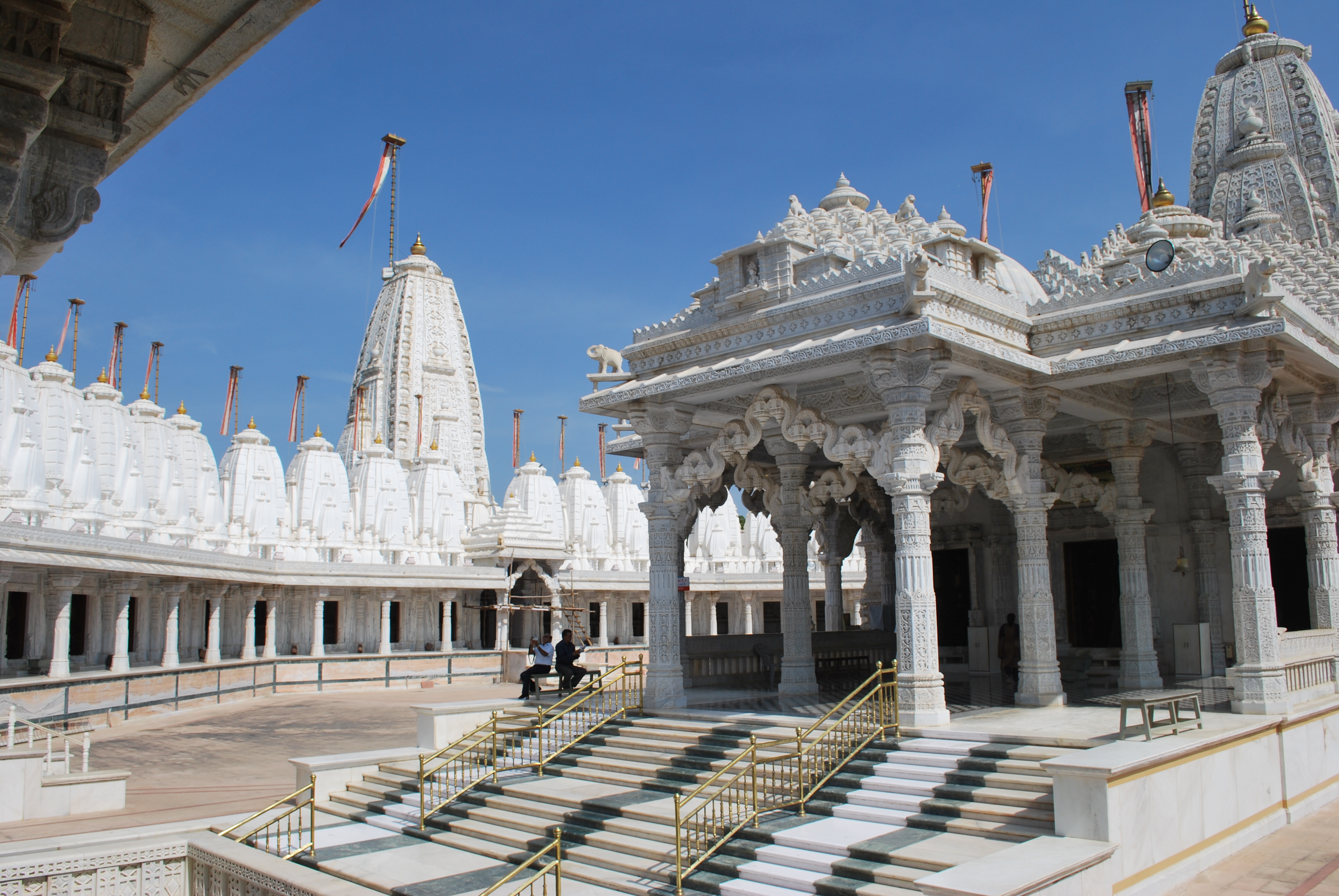
The Bounter Jinalaya (or "72 Jinalaya") Jain temple at Mandvi, Kutch, Gujarat, begun 1982

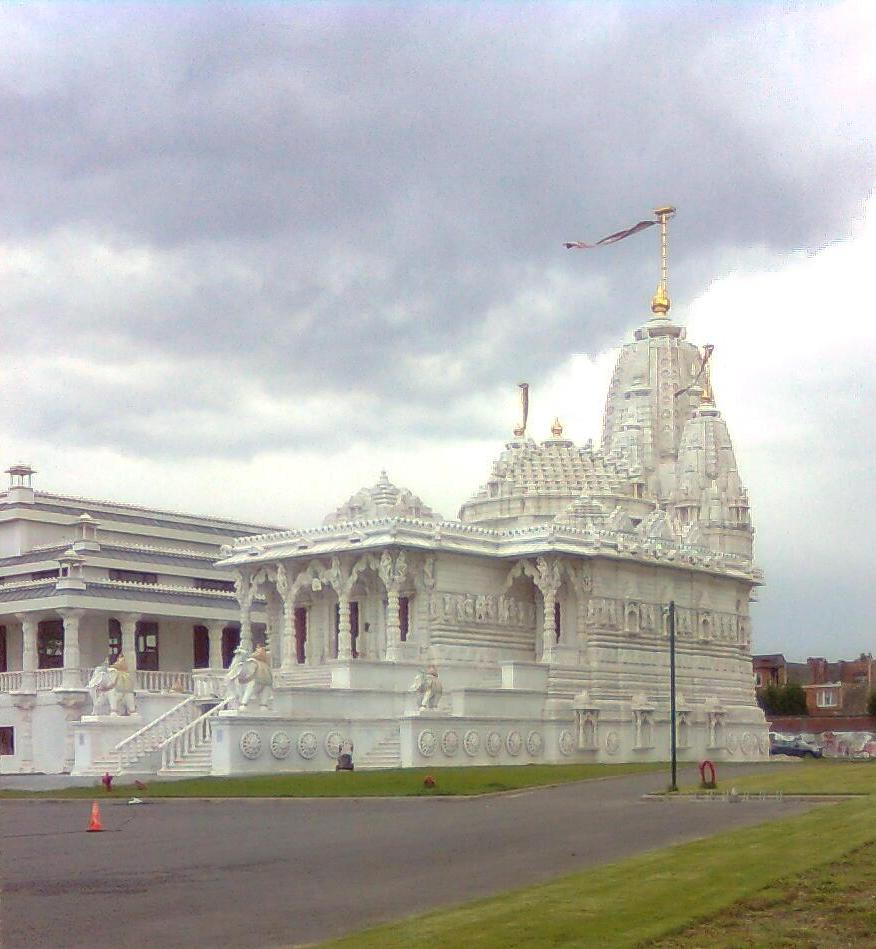
The Jain temple, Antwerp, Belgium, completed 2010

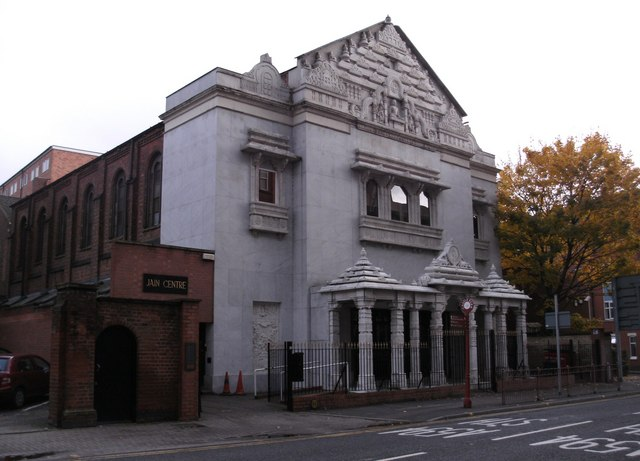
The Jain Centre, Leicester, England. A facade "clad with Māru-Gurjara ornamentation" on a former church.

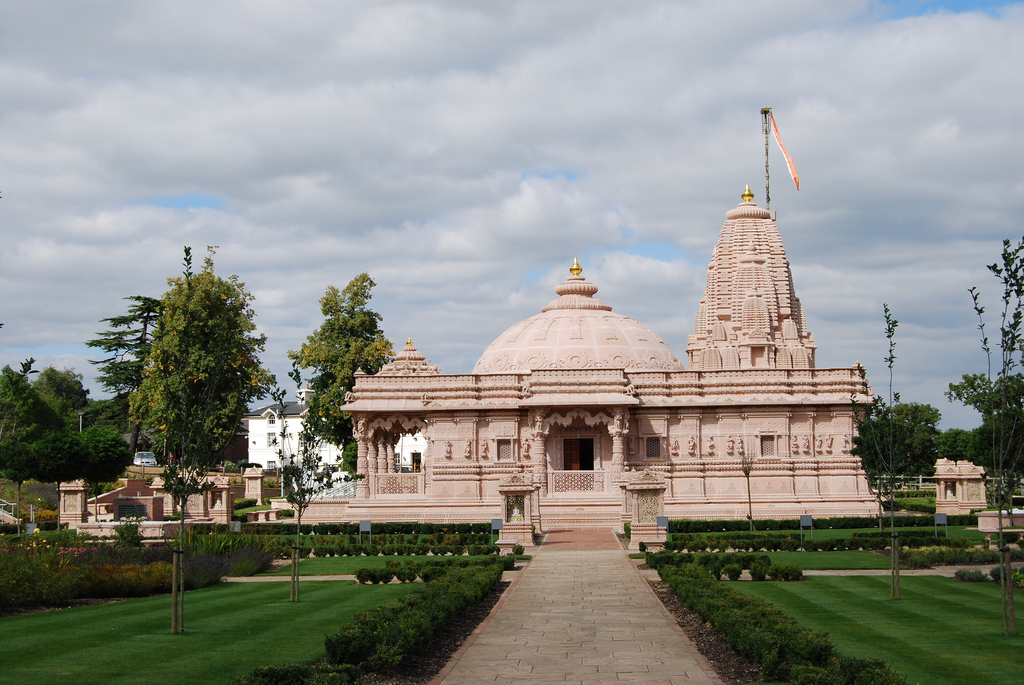
Jain Temple at the Oshwal Centre, Potters Bar, Hertfordshire, which "recreates a general Māru-Gurjara aesthetic". Side view.

== Background ==
The Māru-Gurjara style did not represent a radical break with earlier styles. The previous styles in north-west India are mentioned above, and the group of Jain temples of Khajuraho, forming part of the famous Khajuraho Group of Monuments are very largely in the same style as their Hindu companions, which were mostly built between 950 and 1050. They share many features with the Māru-Gurjara style: high plinths with many decorated bands on the walls, lavish figurative and decorative carving, balconies looking out on multiple sides, ceiling rosettes, and others, but at Khajuraho the great height of the shikharas is given more emphasis. There are similarities with the contemporary Hoysala architecture from much further south. In both of these styles architecture is treated sculpturally.
