= Jagati =

Jagati may refer to:

- A vedic meter
- Jagati (temple), a structural element in Indian architecture
- Jagati railway station, Kushtia, Bangladesh
- Jagathy, a place in Kerala, India
- Jagathy Sreekumar, an Indian actor
- Jagathy N. K. Achary, an Indian writer

== See also ==
- Jagat (disambiguation)
- Jagathy Jagadeesh in Town, a 2002 Indian film
