= Jagath =

Jagath is both a given name and a surname. Notable people with the name include:

- Jagath Jayasuriya, Sri Lankan Army general
- Jagath Balasuriya, Sri Lankan politician
- Jagath Wickramasinghe, Sri Lankan musician
- Bandula Jagath, Sri Lankan cricketer
- A. P. Jagath Pushpakumara, Sri Lankan politician
- Jagath Chamila, Sri Lankan actor
