= Rajgadhi Timbo =

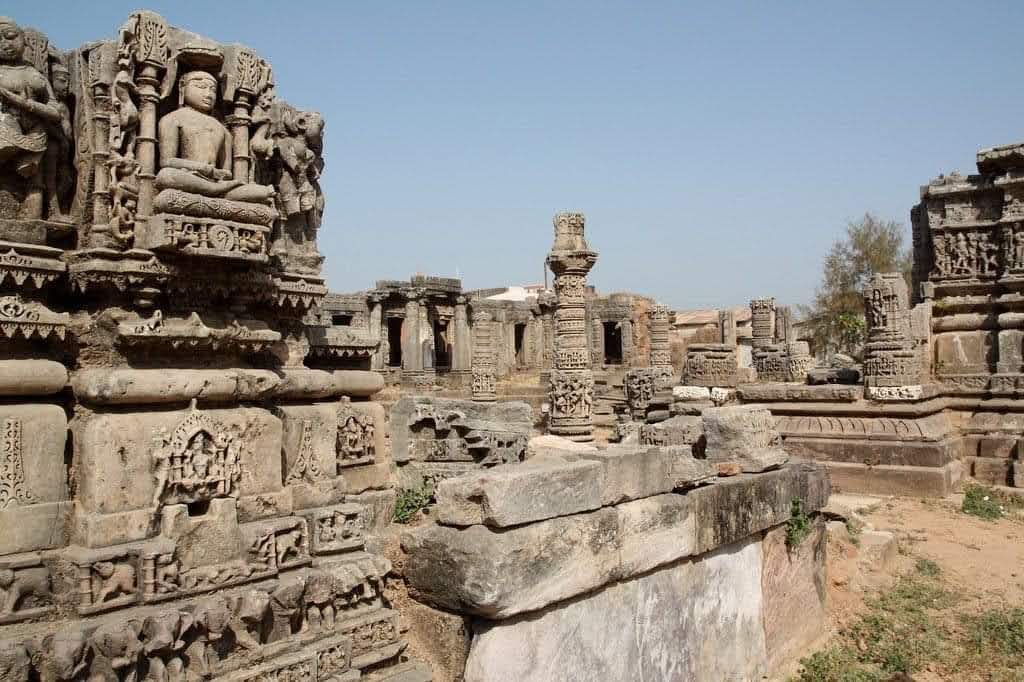
- Ruins of the temple

- Location within Gujarat
- Alternative names: Ruins of Jain Temple at Umta

General information
- Status: ruined
- Type: temple
- Architectural style: Solanki architecture
- Location: Umta village, Visnagar Taluka, Mehsana district, Gujarat, India
- Coordinates: 23°46′51.4178″N 72°33′17.2030″E
- Destroyed: possibly 1299 AD

Technical details
- Material: sandstone
- Grounds: 100 sq metre

Design and construction
- Designations: ASI State Protected Monument (S-GJ-295)

The Rajgadhi Timbo is a mound and historical site of medieval Jain temple located in Umta village in Visnagar Taluka, Mehsana district, Gujarat, India. The site is State Protected Monument under Gujarat State Archeology Department (GSAD).

== History ==
The site of Rajgadhi Timbo was 50 feet high and spread in an area of 3000 square metre surrounded by village.

The place was a site of massive Jain temple. It was possibly attacked by Alauddin Khalji's generals Ulugh Khan and Nusrat Khan during the 1299 invasion of Gujarat. After the first attack in which the upper portion of temple was destroyed, the lower portion was buried in layers of lime under mound to protect it from invaders. After 250 years, Darbar Ummatsinh Rana said to have built the Rajgadhi (royal house) on the mound. In 1726, the Rajgadhi was destroyed in fire when the Marathas led by Kuntaji Bande burned down the village. In 1890, Sayajirao Gaekwad of Baroda State built a school on the mound. In 1985, the back portion of the temple was discovered while demolishing the dilapidated school building for new construction..

Archeology

In 1903, three Jain idols were discovered near Rajgadhi Timba. A farmer again discovered two more idols in 1963 which are now in Kunthunath Jain temple in village. The Gujarat State Archeology Department (GSAD) conducted preliminary excavation in 1984–85. The excavation in 1988-89 revealed structural remains of temple, bastion of bricks and few brick walls. GSAD collected some artifacts but it stopped the excavation few days later due to lack of funds. As GSAD stopped, with permission of district collector, the Śvetāmbara and Digambara sects of Jains joined the hands and started independent excavation in 1993 which was stopped due to disputes between sects regarding who will own idols. The dispute was resolved in 1999 and excavation was restarted in 2001.

After 30 feet height of excavation, the Jain temple was unearthed. The temple complex was spread in area of 100 square metre. The sandstone temple is in Solanki style. The upper part including Shikhar and Mandapa found in rubble the lower part is almost intact. Jain as well as some Hindu idols were found.

The date of construction is not certain but the Prakrit inscriptions found on the pedestal of idols describes the idols were carved on the orders of King Jayasinh Umat and his consorts Shia and Sundari in Vikram Samvat 1240. It is constructed between 11th and 13th century. It seems to be constructed in two stages; the lower part in the 11th century. More than 70 idols were discovered belonging to both sects buried under sand near foundation of the temple which indicates intentional burial. The walls and pillars of temple has intrinsically carved images.
