= Ambika Mata Temple =

Hindu temple in Rajasthan, India

Ambika temple
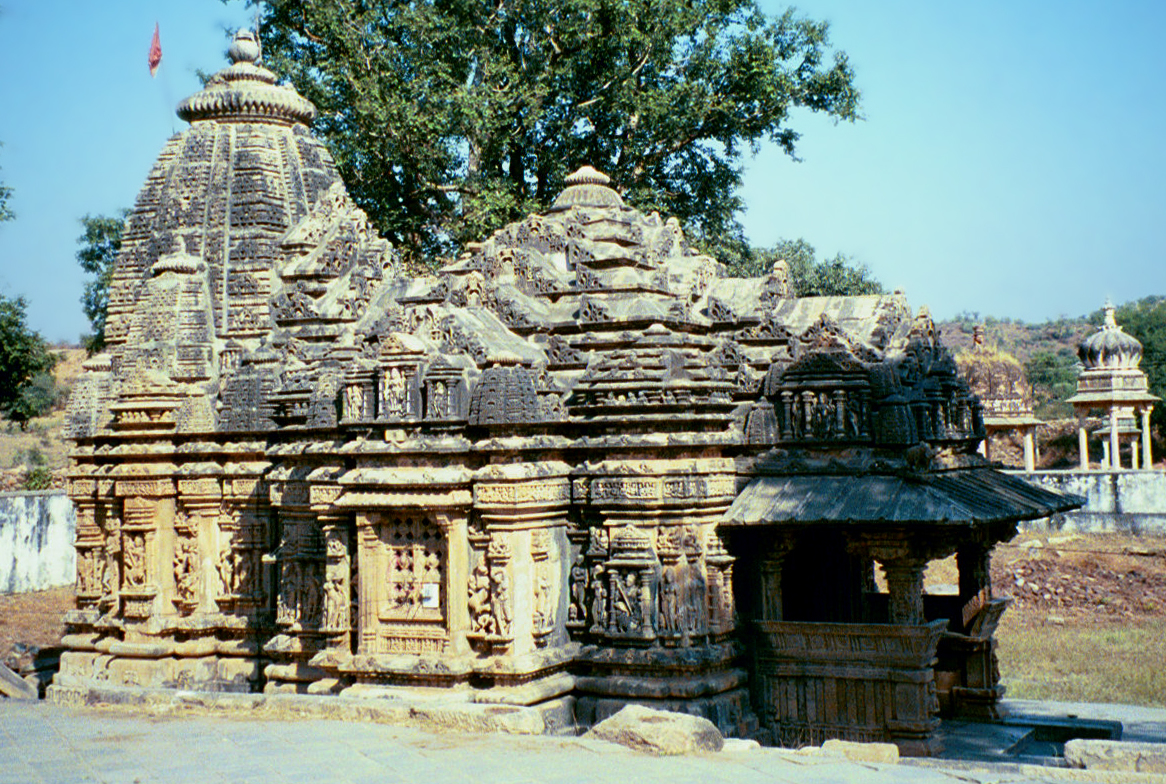

- Location within Rajasthan

Religion
- Affiliation: Hinduism
- Deity: Durga

Location
- Location: Jagat village near Udaipur, Rajasthan
- Coordinates: 24°17′28.2″N 73°50′43.2″E

Architecture
- Style: Māru-Gurjara architecture
- Established: 961 CE

Ambika Mata Mandir is a Hindu temple located in the village of Jagat, about 50 km southeast of Udaipur in the state of Rajasthan, India. Ambika Devi, a form of Goddess Durga is the presiding deity of the temple. It was built under the reign of Rawal Allata of Mewar. The temple, located in a cleft of rock possesses a number of inscriptions. The earliest one, dated 961 AD, refers to a repair made to it. Today, the temple is preserved by the State Department of Archaeology and Museum, Rajasthan.

The temple is an early, transitional, example of the style known as Māru-Gurjara architecture.

This is a little-known temple, dating back to the tenth century with images of Durga and many other female divinities. Ambika, a form of the Hindu Goddess Durga, is the principal image in the shrine and worshipped as Shakti, a primeval source of energy. She is associated with Durga through her lion mount and is connected to the Jains through a vision advising Vimala about building his Adinath temple at Mount Abu.

== Architecture ==
The temple is also known as the Khajuraho of Mewar. There are many fine sculptures in the temple which have been excellently preserved. This pentagonal temple, enclosed by a massive rampart wall, has 17 turrets and a pagoda-like gabled roof. Exquisite details appear high on the exterior walls of the temple, above larger sculptures of gods or goddesses, with musicians, dancers, and singers of the heavenly court, as well as countless beautiful women. The richness and arrangement of the carving often has a curling vegetal motif. The theme is of a mountain palace, a heavenly abode of the gods. The tower is covered with intricate motifs, including clouds, and is surrounded by small shikhara towers which echo the surrounding mountain peaks. The architecture of the mountain palace, as the heavenly abode of the gods, echoes the temple which is their earthly residence.

== Sculptures ==
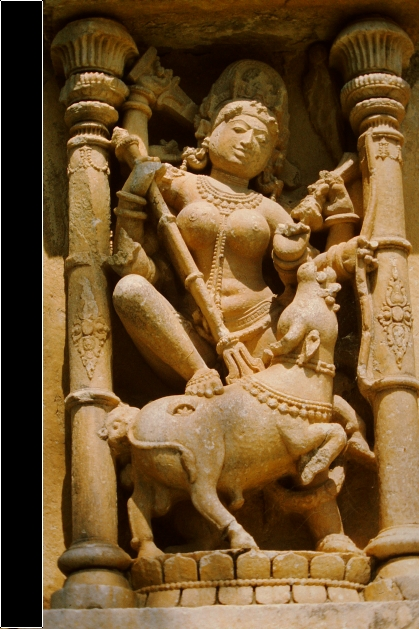
Durga

As a Devi temple, most of the sculptures here represent either (1) Durga, the fierce devi, or (2) Lakshmi and other beneficent devis, or (3) Brahmani and other theoretical counterparts of the traditional (male) Hindu divinities.

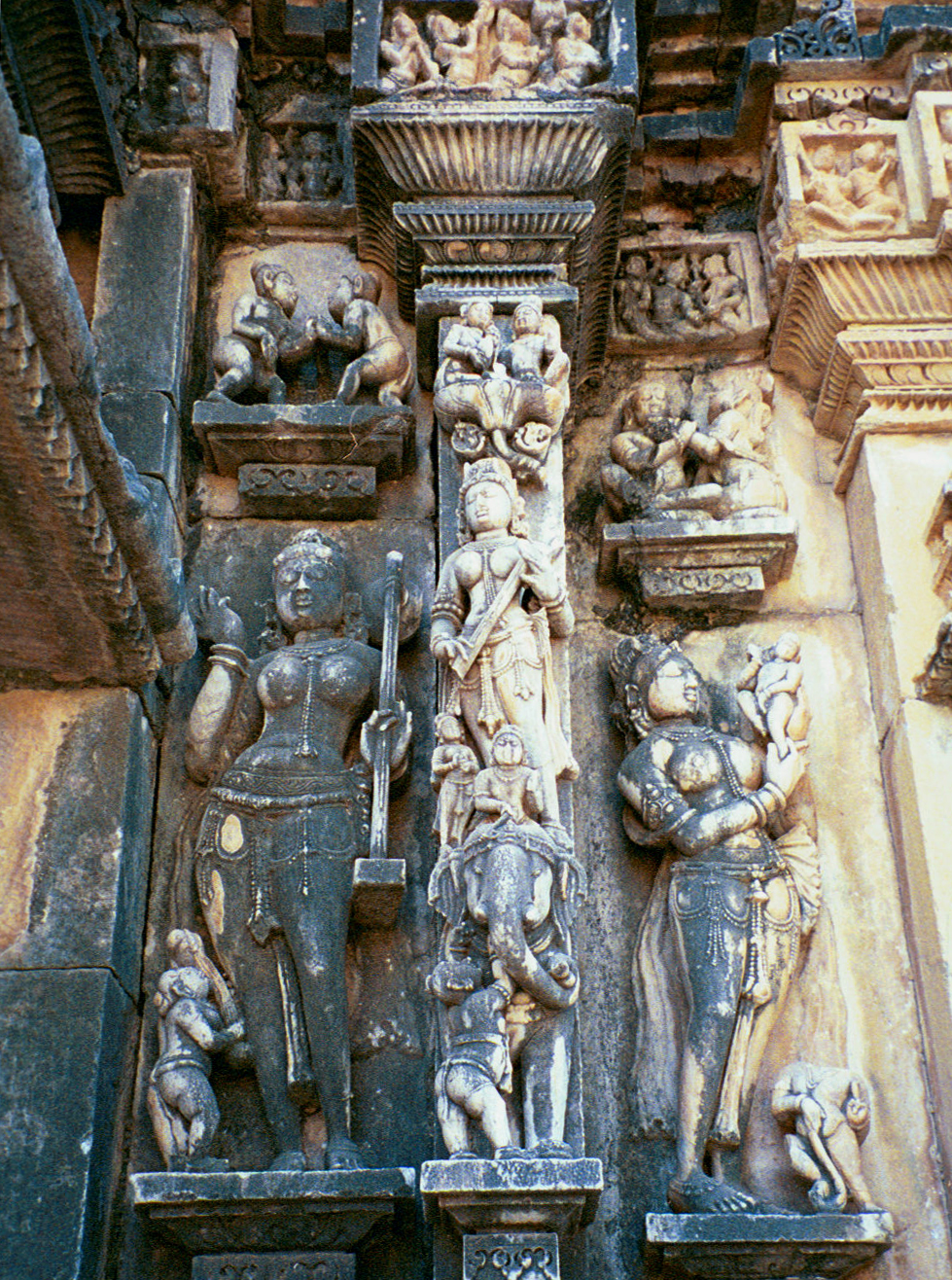
Ladies of the Heavenly Court.Ambika Mata temple, Jagat. This section of the wall is decorated with goddesses in various postures: holding an Eka-tantri vina (photo left), playing a vina (type unknown) while supported by an elephant (photo center), and holding a child (photo right).

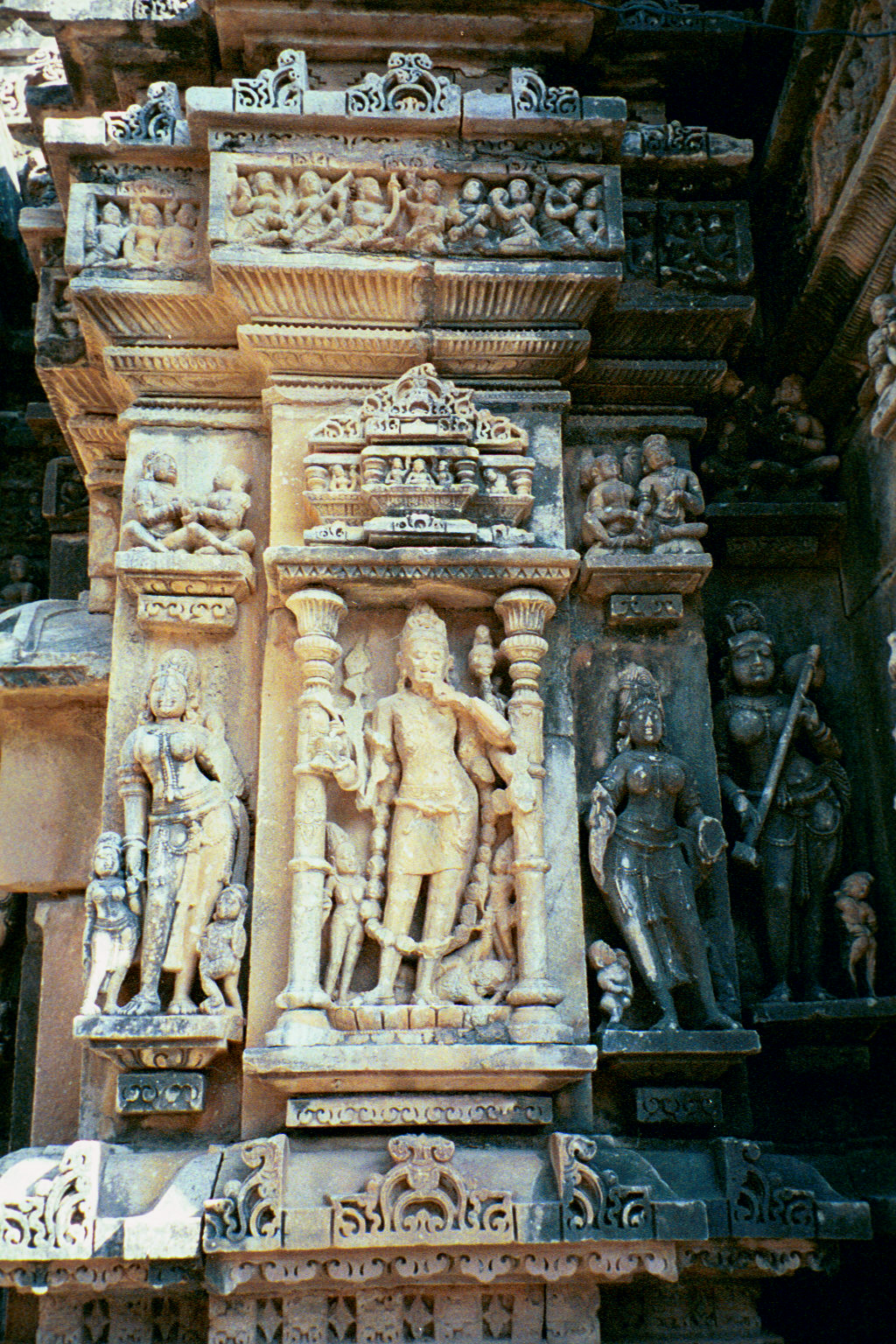
A fierce form of Devi, Chamunda is portrayed as a frightening, emaciated hag. Her attributes include fangs, a sword, Shiva's trident, skull garland, skull staff, skull bowl, and skeletal corpse which she tramples or sits on. Woman playing eka-tantri vina, far right.

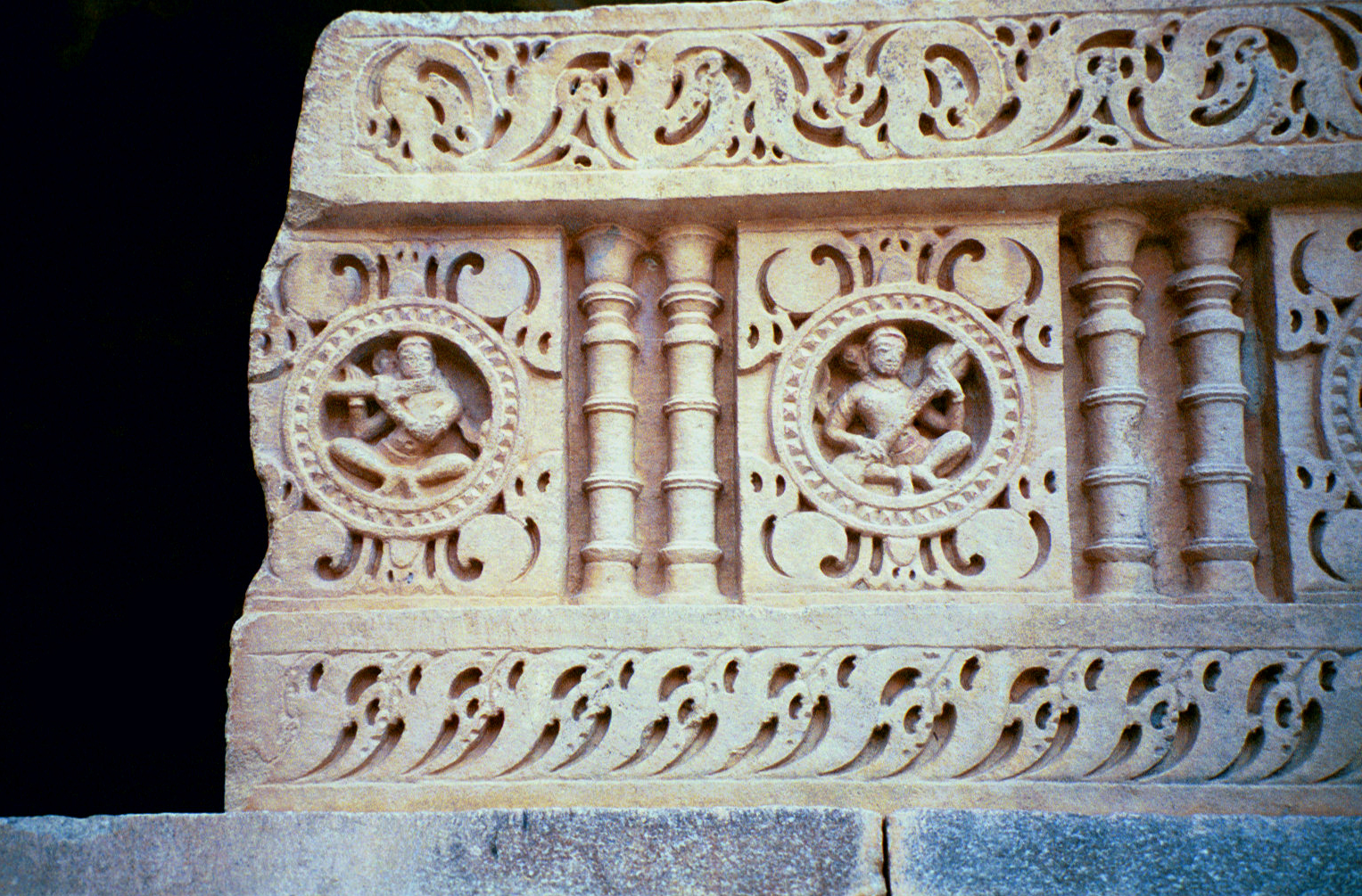
Musician's playing flute and a vina.

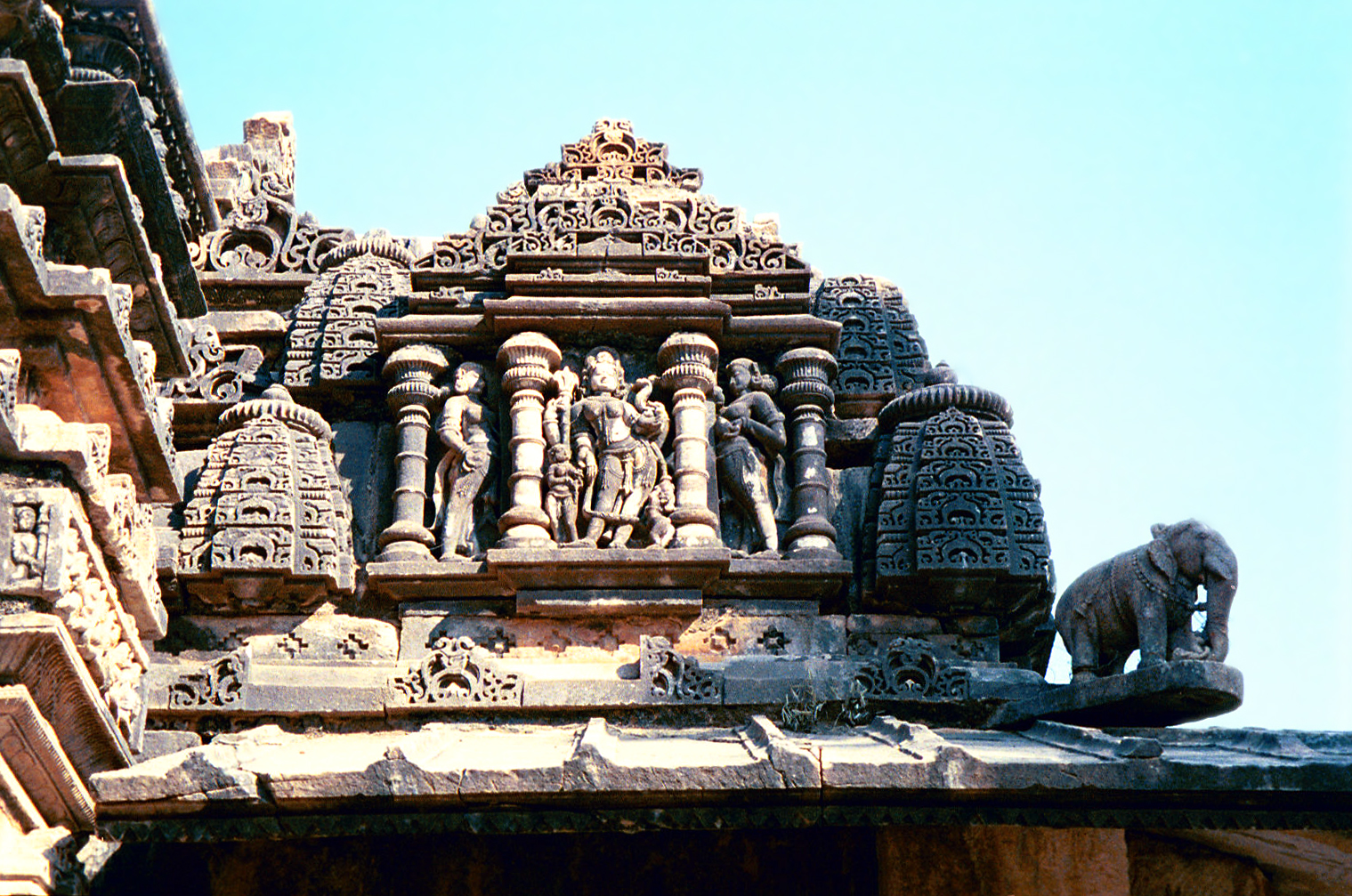
Roof model
