= Bandula Jagath =

Sri Lankan cricketer

Bandula Jagath was a Sri Lankan cricketer. He was a left-handed batsman and a left-arm medium-pace bowler who played for Moors Sports Club.

Jagath made a single first-class appearance for the side, during the 1995–96 season, against Nondescripts. From the tail end, he scored 15 in the first innings in which he batted, and 0 not out in the second, as his team lost the match by an innings margin, thanks to first-class bests from Russel Arnold and Carman Mapatuna.
