= Laxman Singh (Madhya Pradesh politician) =

Indian politician

Laxman Singh was an Indian politician from the state of the Madhya Pradesh. He represented Biaora Vidhan Sabha constituency of undivided Madhya Pradesh Legislative Assembly by winning General election of 1957.
