= Hindu temple architecture =

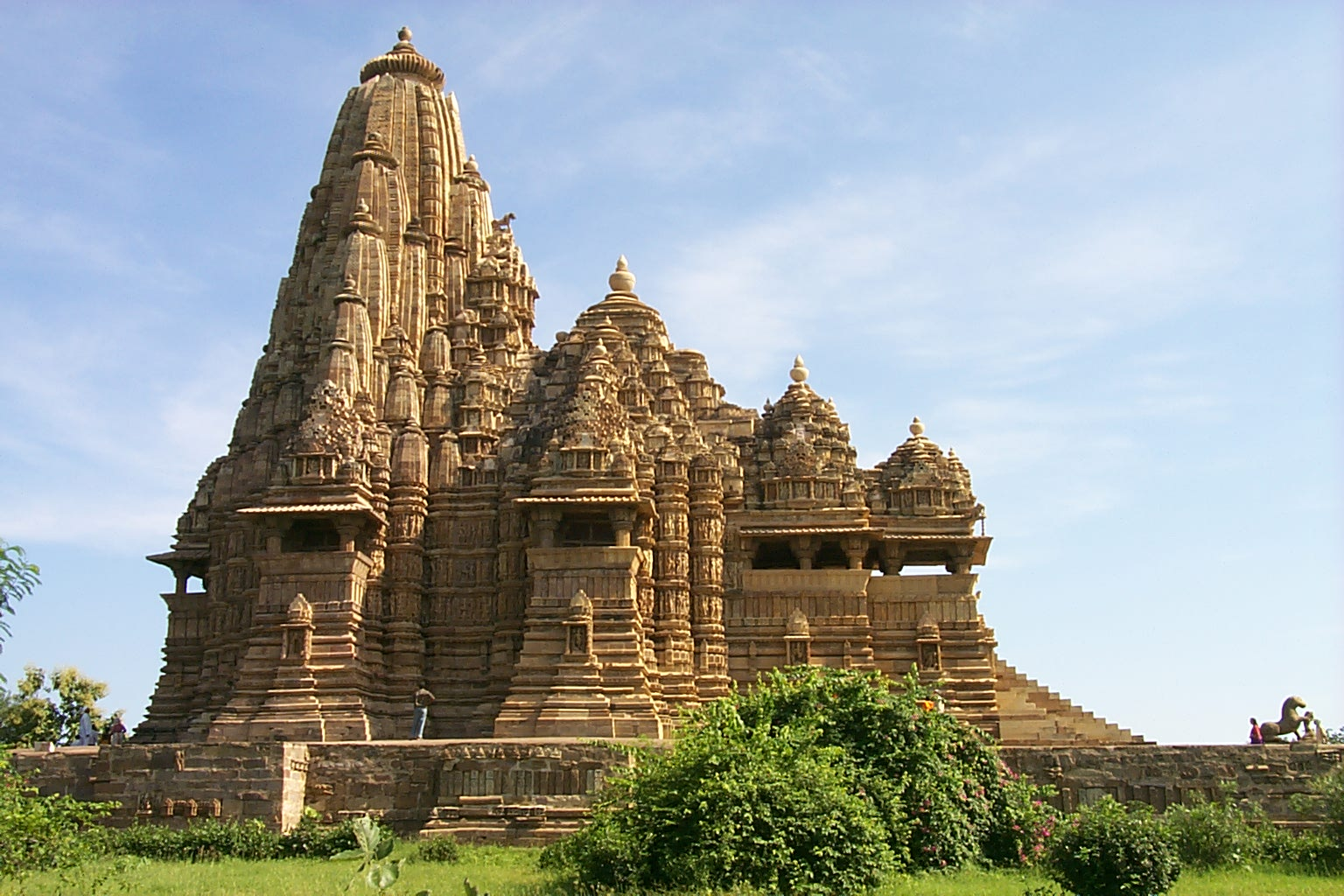
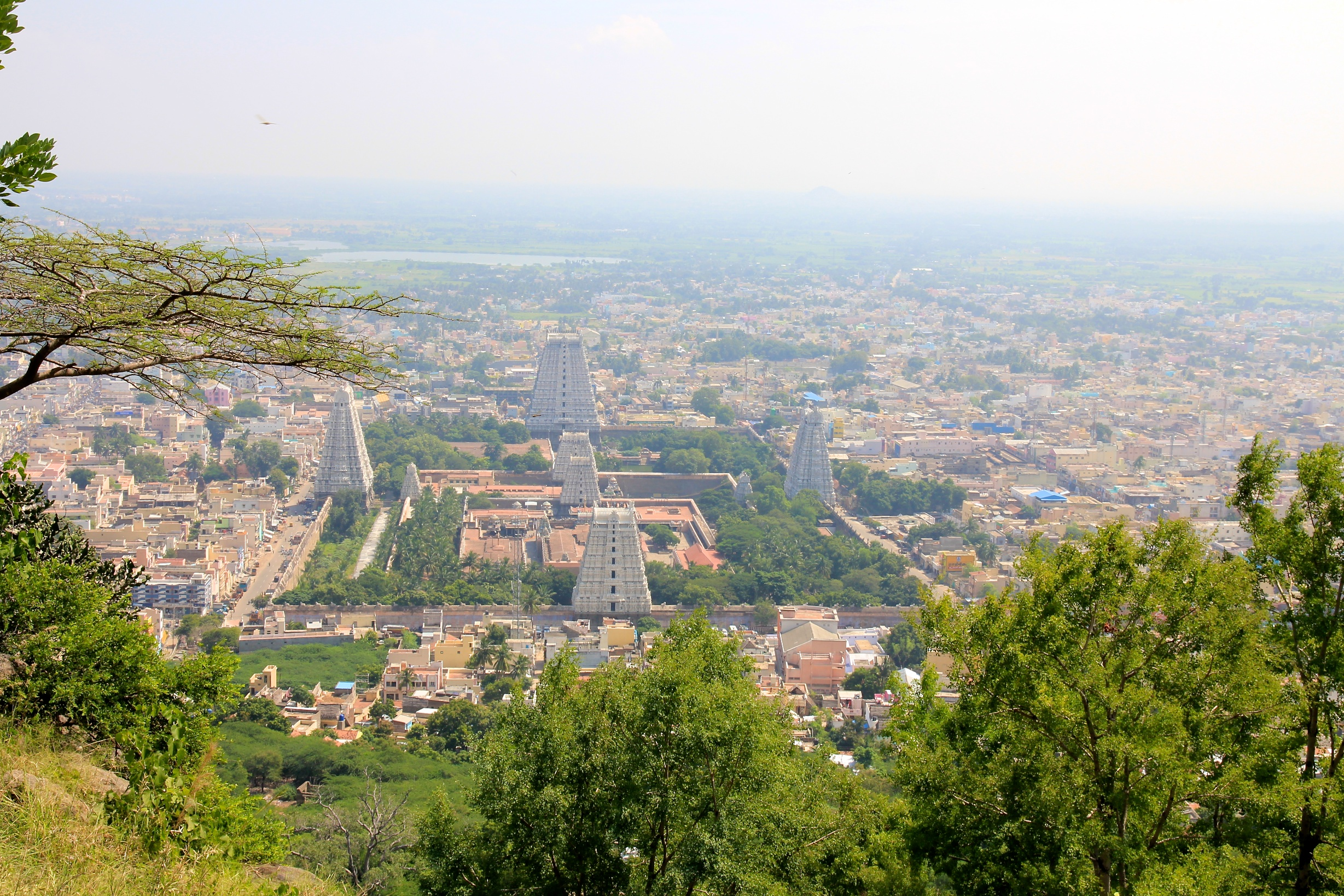
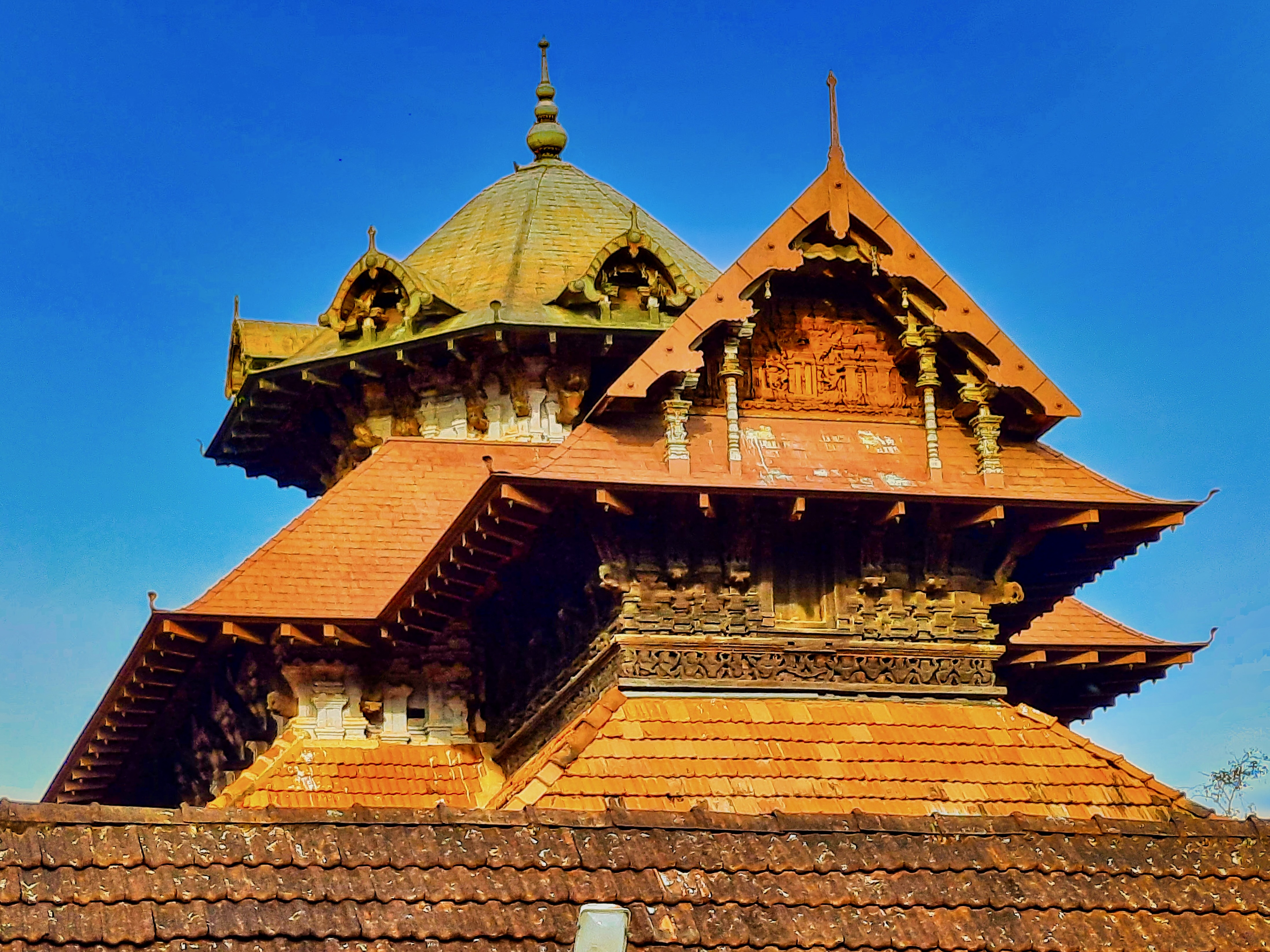
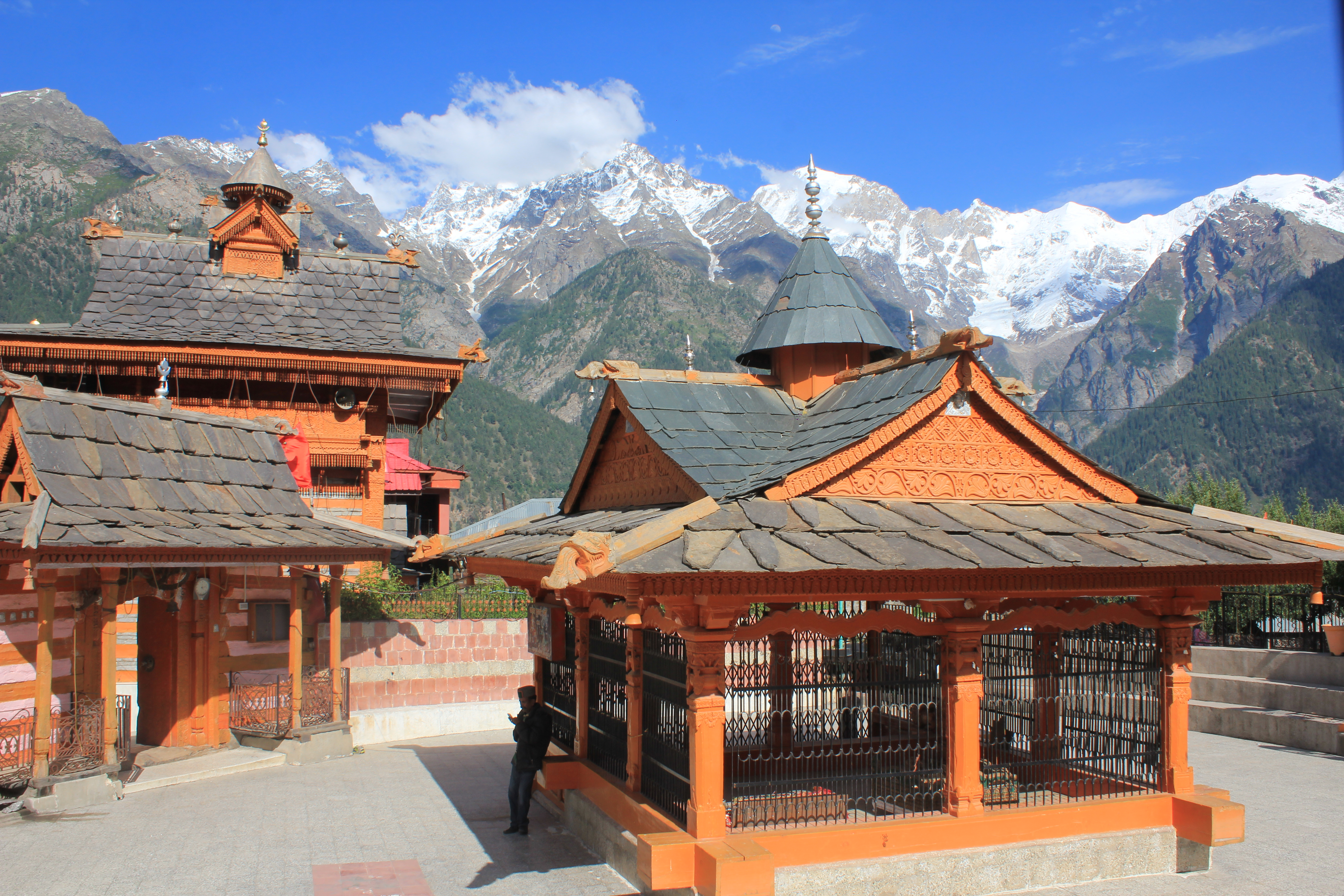
Types of Hindu temple architecture in India from left to right: Nagara style of northern India, Dravida style of southern India, Kerala style with Dravida influences and Kathkuni style in Himachal Pradesh with Nagara influences.

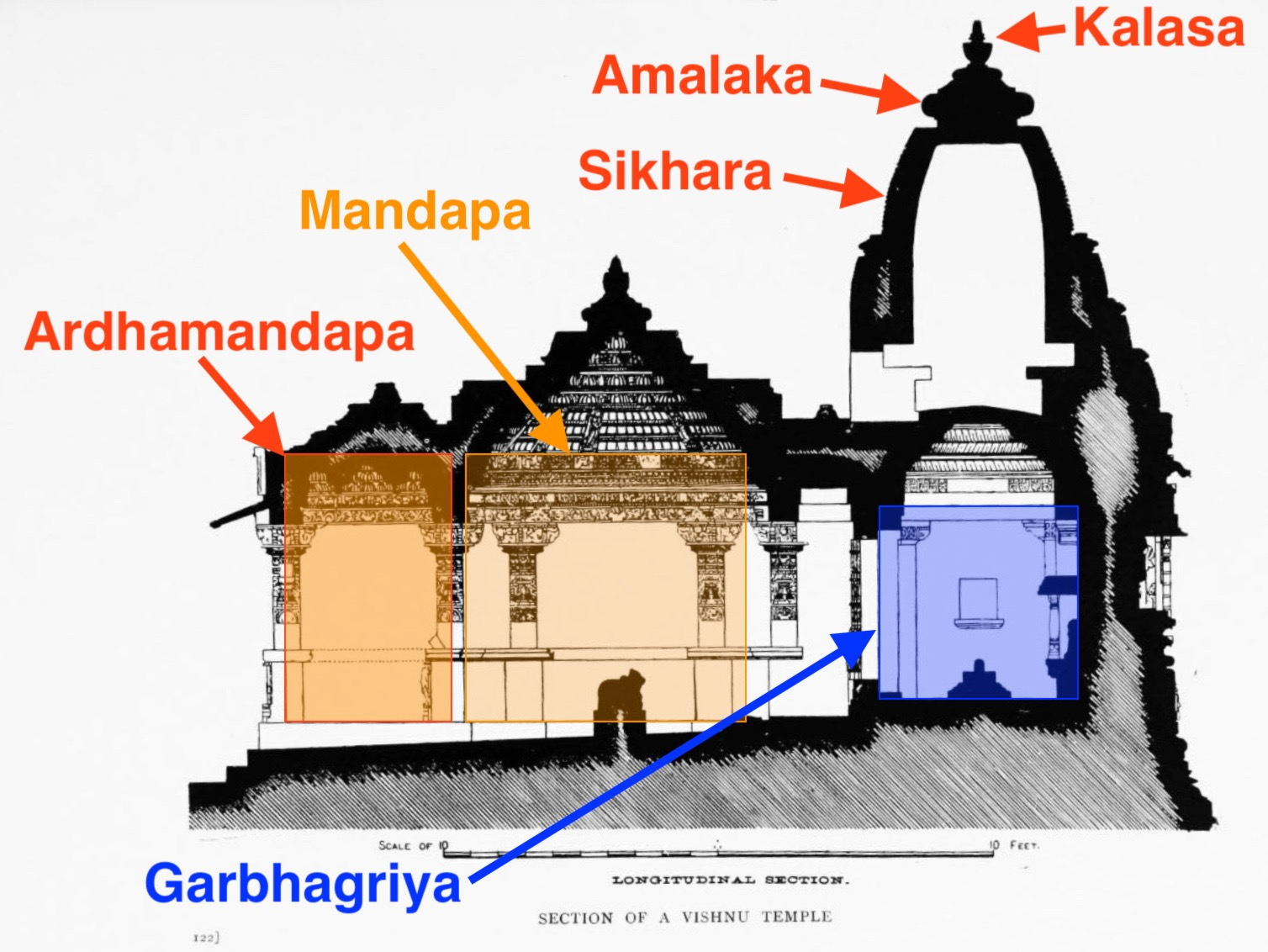
Architecture of a Hindu temple (Nagara style). These core elements are evidenced in the oldest surviving 5th–6th century CE temples.

Hindu temple architecture, the principal form of Hindu architecture, encompasses many different styles, though the basic form of the Hindu temple remains the same. The essential feature is an inner sanctum, the garbha griha or womb-chamber, where the primary Murti or the image of a deity is housed in a simple bare cell. For rituals and prayers, this chamber frequently has an open space that can be moved in a clockwise direction. There are frequently additional buildings and structures in the vicinity of this chamber, with the largest ones covering several acres. On the exterior, the garbhagriha is crowned by a tower-like shikhara, also called the vimana in the south. Gopuram gateways are elaborate in the south. These are topped with a finial called kalasha. The shrine building often includes a circumambulatory passage for parikrama, a mandapa congregation hall, and sometimes an antarala antechamber and porch between garbhagriha and mandapa. In addition to other small temples in the compound, there may be additional mandapas or buildings that are either connected or separate from the larger temples.

Hindu temple architecture reflects a synthesis of arts, the ideals of dharma, values, and the way of life cherished under Hinduism. The temple is a tirtha—pilgrimage site. All the cosmic elements that create and celebrate life in Hindu pantheon, are present in a Hindu temple—from fire to water, from images of nature to deities, from the feminine to the masculine, from kama to artha, from the fleeting sounds and incense smells to Purusha—the eternal nothingness yet universality—is part of a Hindu temple architecture. The form and meanings of architectural elements in a Hindu temple are designed to function as a place in which to create a link between man and the divine, to help his progress to spiritual knowledge and truth, his liberation it calls moksha.

The architectural principles of Hindu temples in India are described in the Shilpa Shastras and Vastu Sastras. The Hindu culture has encouraged aesthetic independence to its temple builders, and its architects have sometimes exercised considerable flexibility in creative expression by adopting other perfect geometries and mathematical principles in Mandir construction to express the Hindu Way of life.

Hindu temple architecture and its various styles has had a profound influence on the stylistic origins of Buddhist architecture. Aspects seen on Buddhist architecture like the stupa may have been influenced by the shikhara, a stylistic element which in some regions evolved to the pagoda which are seen throughout Thailand, Cambodia, Nepal, China, Taiwan, Japan, Korea, Myanmar, and Vietnam.

== History ==
=== Early structures ===
Temple of Vāsudeva in Besnagar (2nd century BCE)

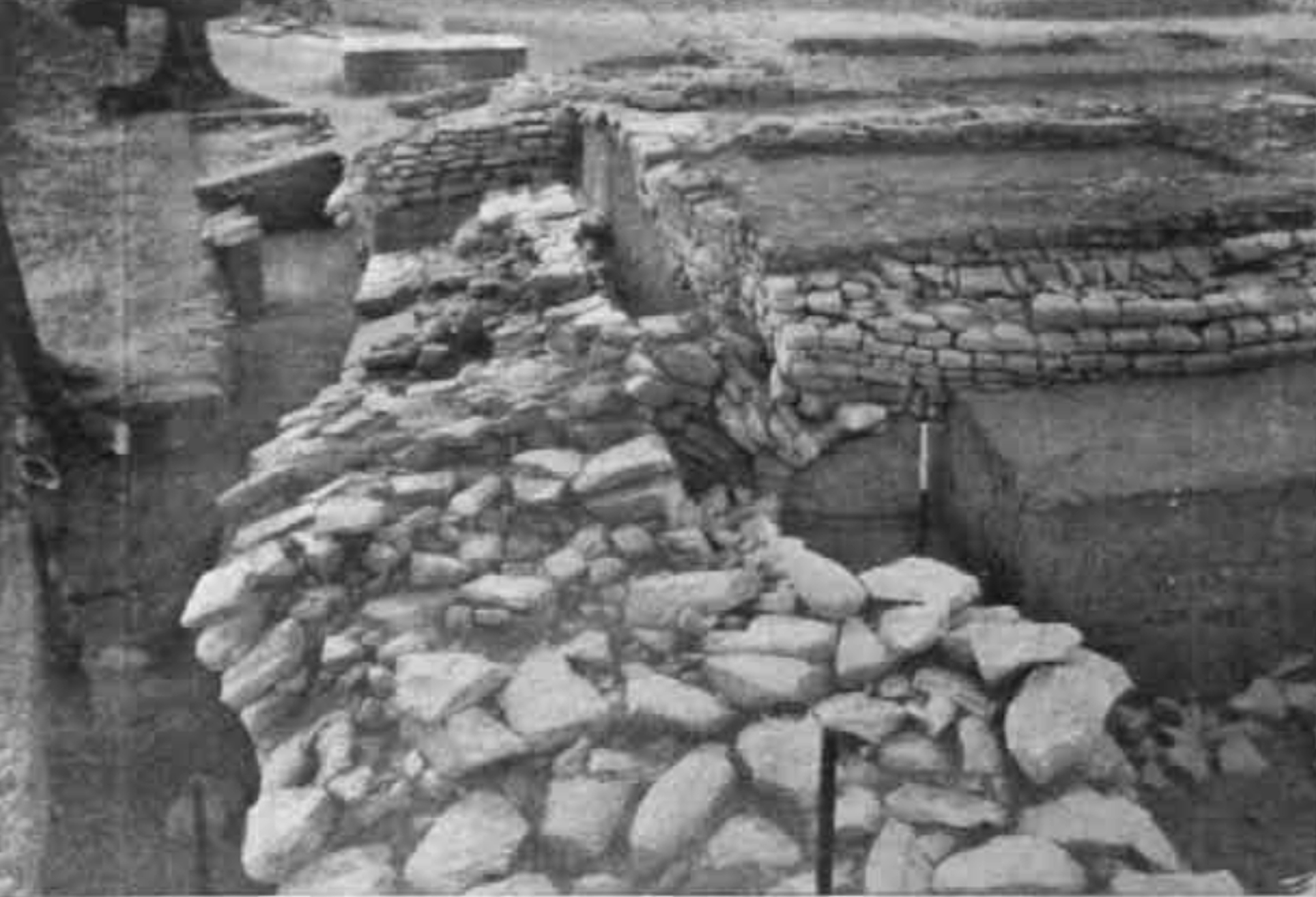
Initial excavations

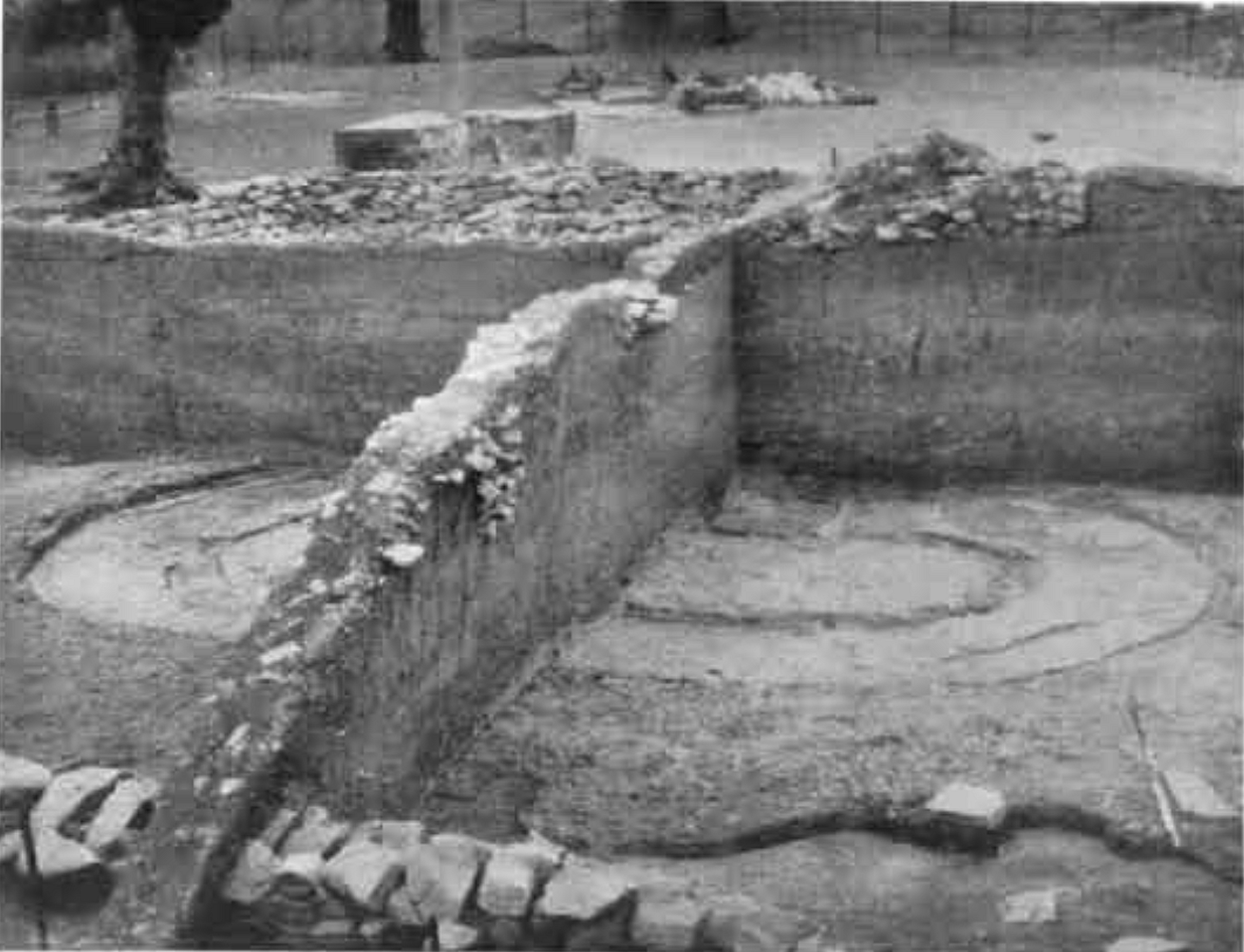
Elliptic plan of the Temple

Excavation of the huge Temple of Vāsudeva next to the Heliodorus pillar in Besnagar. The Temple measured 30x30 meters, and the walls were 2.4 meters thick. Pottery remains assigns the site to the 2nd century BCE. Further excavations also revealed the outline of a smaller elliptic temple structure, which was probably destroyed by the end of the 3rd century BCE. The platform and the base of the Heliodorus pillar are visible in the immediate background.

Remains of early elliptical shrines discovered in Besnagar (3rd-2nd century BCE) and Nagari (1st century BCE), may be the earliest known Hindu temple structures, associated to the early Bhagavata tradition, a precursor of Vaishnavism. In Tamil Nadu, the earliest version of the Murugan Temple, Saluvankuppam, north-facing and in brick, appears to date from between the 3rd century BCE and 3rd century CE.

In Besnagar, the temple structures have been found in conjonction with the Heliodorus pillar dedicated to Vāsudeva. The archaeologists found an ancient elliptical foundation, extensive floor and plinth produced from burnt bricks. Further, the foundations for all the major components of a Hindu temple – garbhagriha (sanctum), pradakshinapatha (circumambulation passage), antarala (antechamber next to sanctum) and mandapa (gathering hall) – were found. These sections had a thick support base for their walls. These core temple remains cover an area of 30 x 30 m. The sections had post-holes, which likely contained the wooden pillars for the temple superstructure above. In the soil were iron nails that likely held together the wooden pillars. The superstructure of the temple was likely made of wood, mud and other perishable materials.

The ancient temple complex discovered in Nagari (Chittorgarh, Rajasthan) – about 500 kilometres to the west of Vidisha, has a sub-surface structure nearly identical to that of the Besnagar temple. The structure is also associated to the cult of Vāsudeva and Saṃkarṣaṇa, and dated to the 1st century BCE.

=== Classical period (4-6th century) ===
Hindu temples of the Gupta period

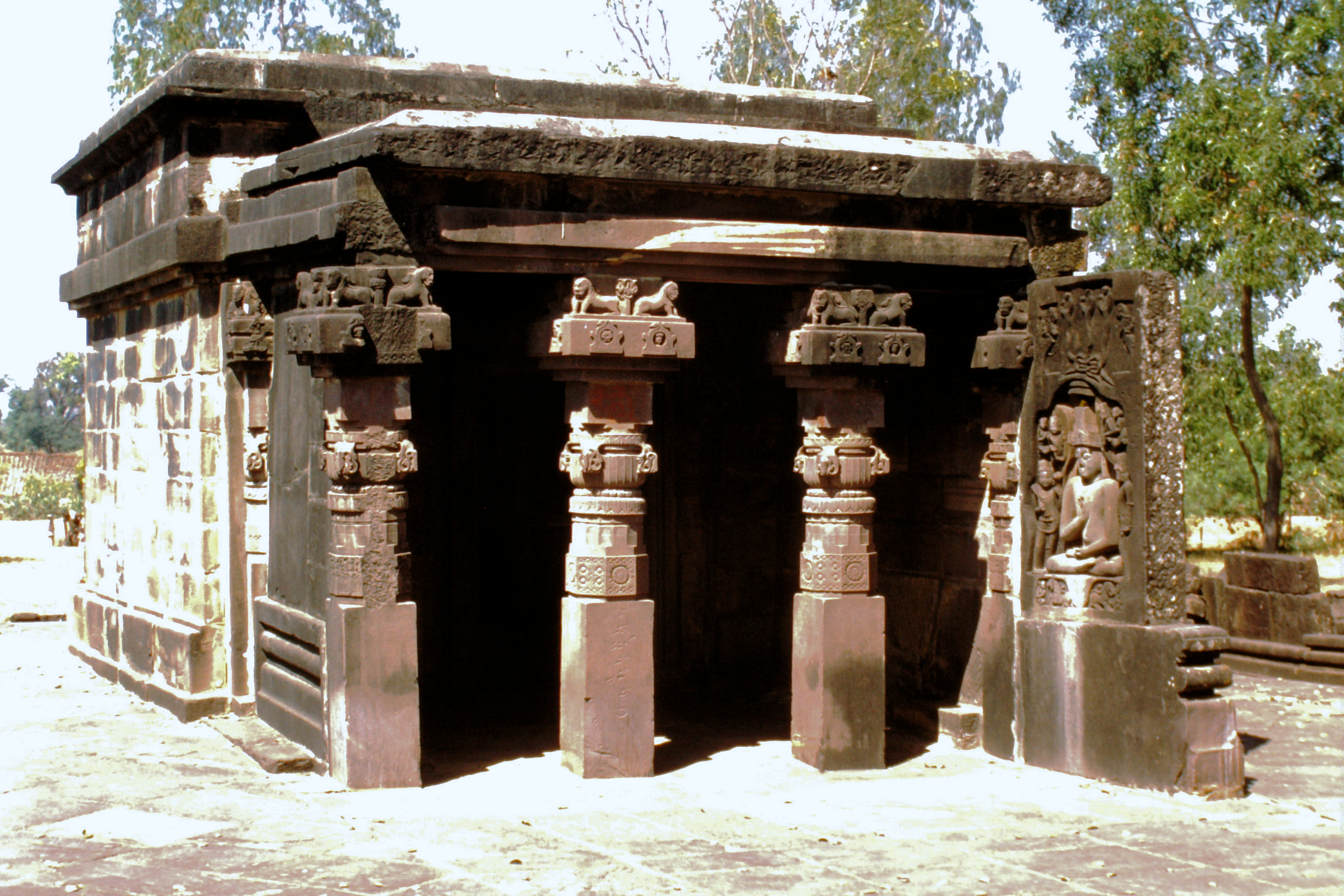
Kankali Devi temple in Tigawa, 5th century

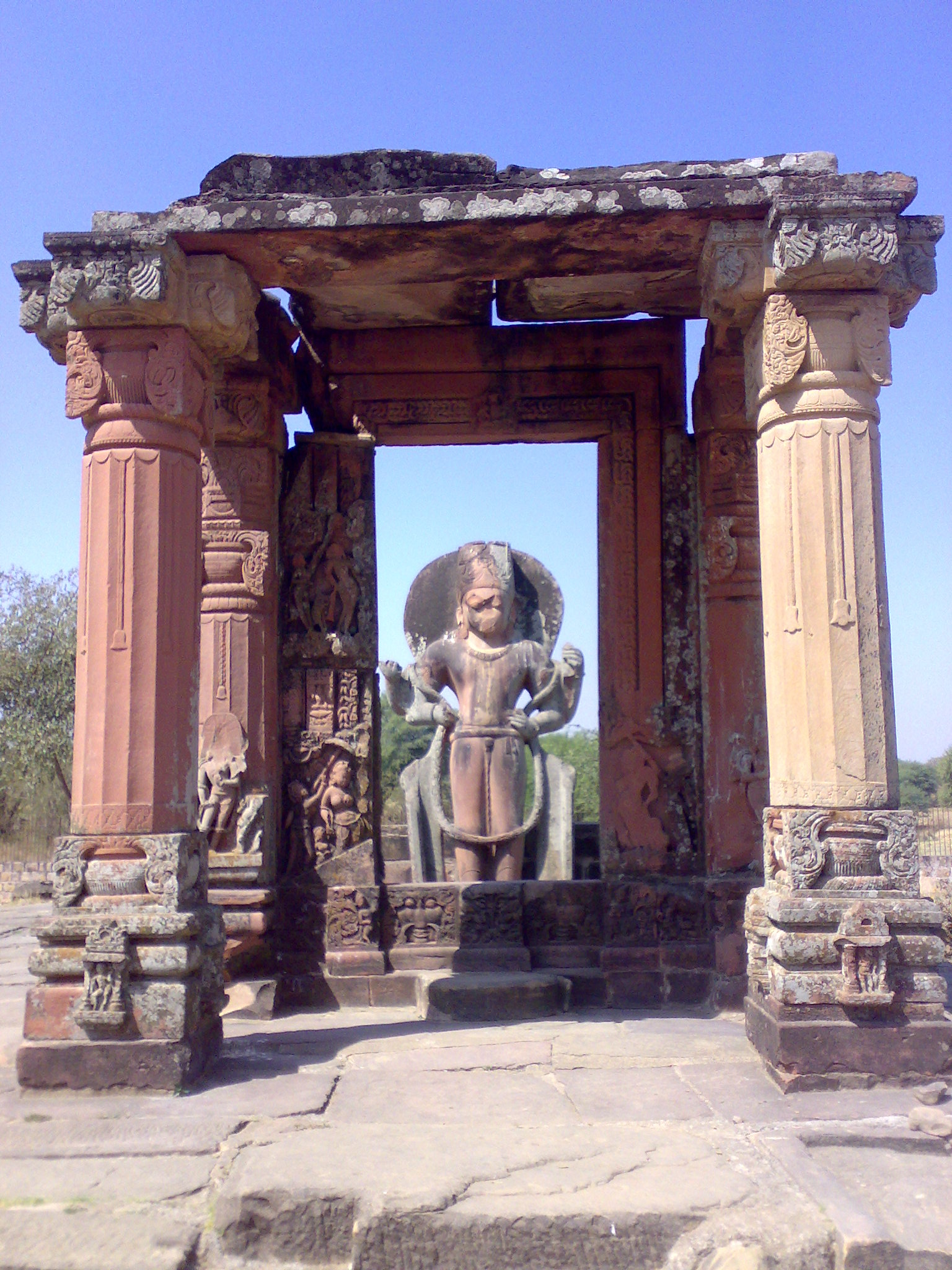
Vishnu temple in Eran, late 5th century.

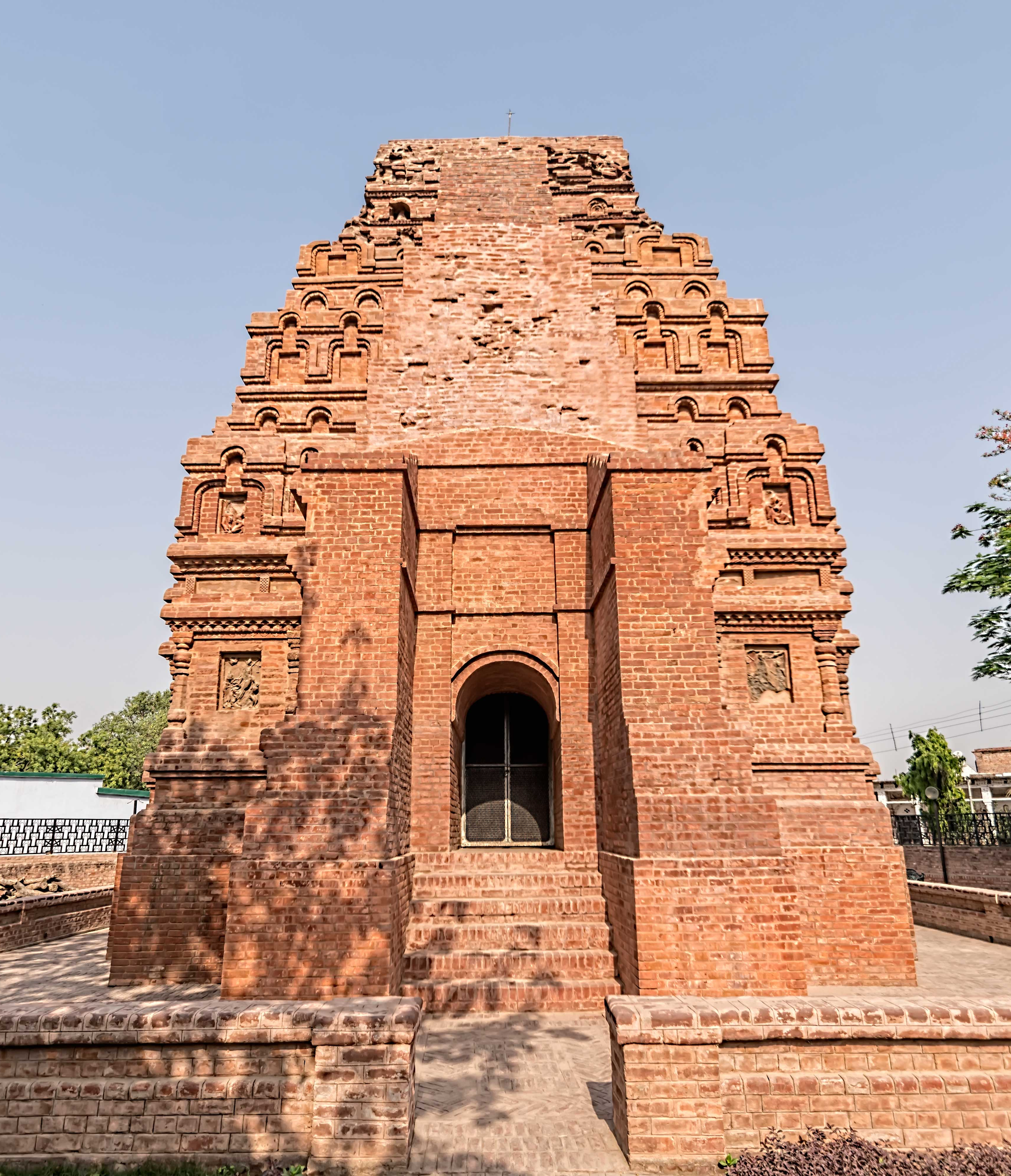
Hindu temple of Bhitargaon, late 5th century.

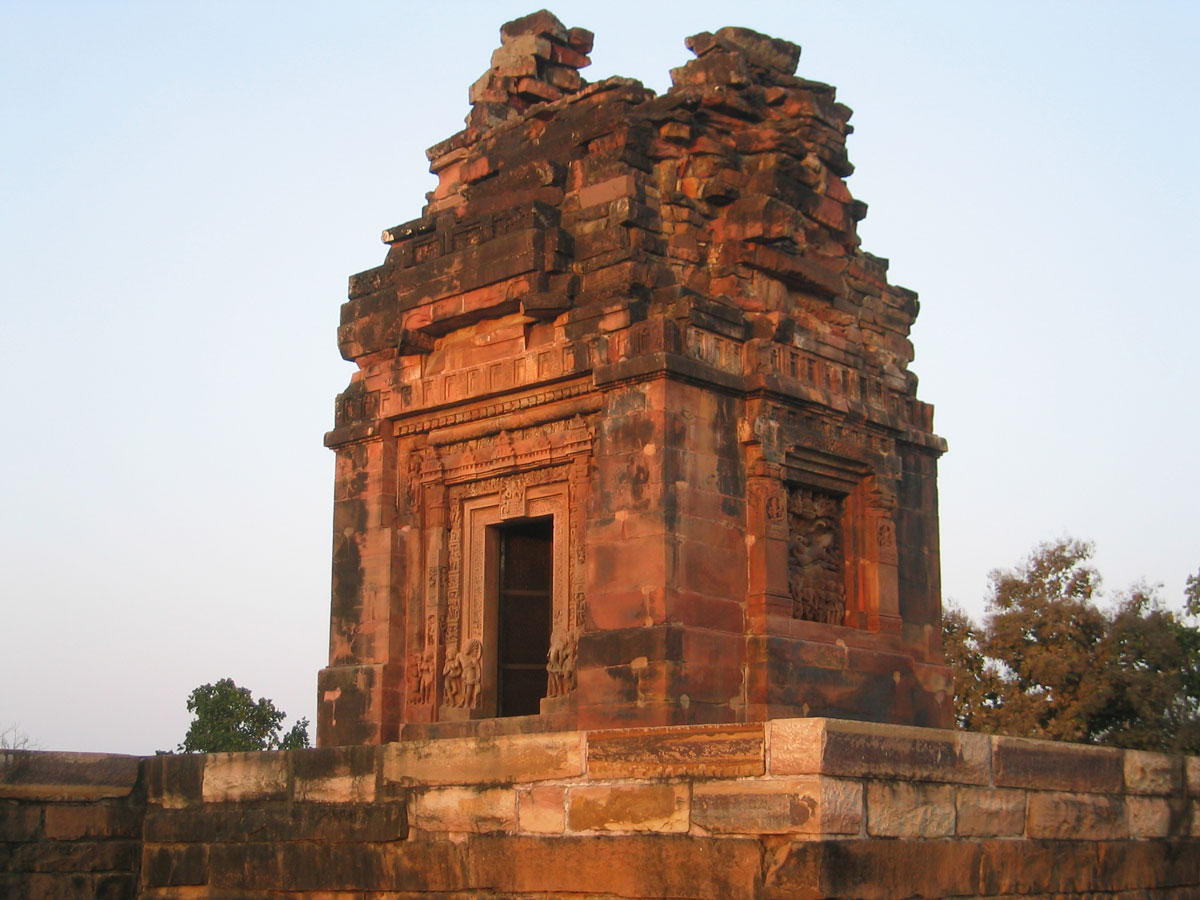
Dashavatara Temple, Deogarh, early 6th century

Though there are very few remains of stone Hindu temples before the Gupta dynasty in the 5th century CE, there may be earlier structures constructed from timber-based architecture. The rock-cut Udayagiri Caves (401 CE) are among the most important early sites, built with royal sponsorship, recorded by inscriptions, and with impressive sculpture. The earliest preserved Hindu temples are simple cell-like stone temples, some rock-cut and others structural, as at Temple 17 at Sanchi. By the 6th or 7th century, these evolved into high shikhara stone superstructures. However, there is inscriptional evidence such as the ancient Gangadhara inscription from about 424 CE, states Meister, that towering temples existed before this time and these were possibly made from more perishable material. These temples have not survived.

Examples of early major North Indian temples that have survived after the Udayagiri Caves in Madhya Pradesh include those at Tigawa, Deogarh, Parvati Temple, Nachna (465), Bhitargaon, the largest Gupta brick temple to survive, Lakshman Brick Temple, Sirpur (600-625 CE); Rajiv Lochan temple, Rajim (7th-century). Gop Temple in Gujarat (c. 550 or later) is an oddity, with no surviving close comparator.

No pre-7th century CE South Indian free-standing stone temples have survived. Examples of early major South Indian temples that have survived, some in ruins, include the diverse styles at Mahabalipuram, from the 7th and 8th centuries. According to Meister, the Mahabalipuram temples are "monolithic models of a variety of formal structures all of which already can be said to typify a developed "Dravida" (South Indian) order". They suggest a tradition and a knowledge base existed in South India by the time of the early Chalukya and Pallava era when these were built. In the Deccan, Cave 3 of the Badami cave temples was cut out in 578 CE, and Cave 1 is probably slightly earlier. Other examples are found in Aihole and Pattadakal.

=== Medieval period (7th to 16th century) ===
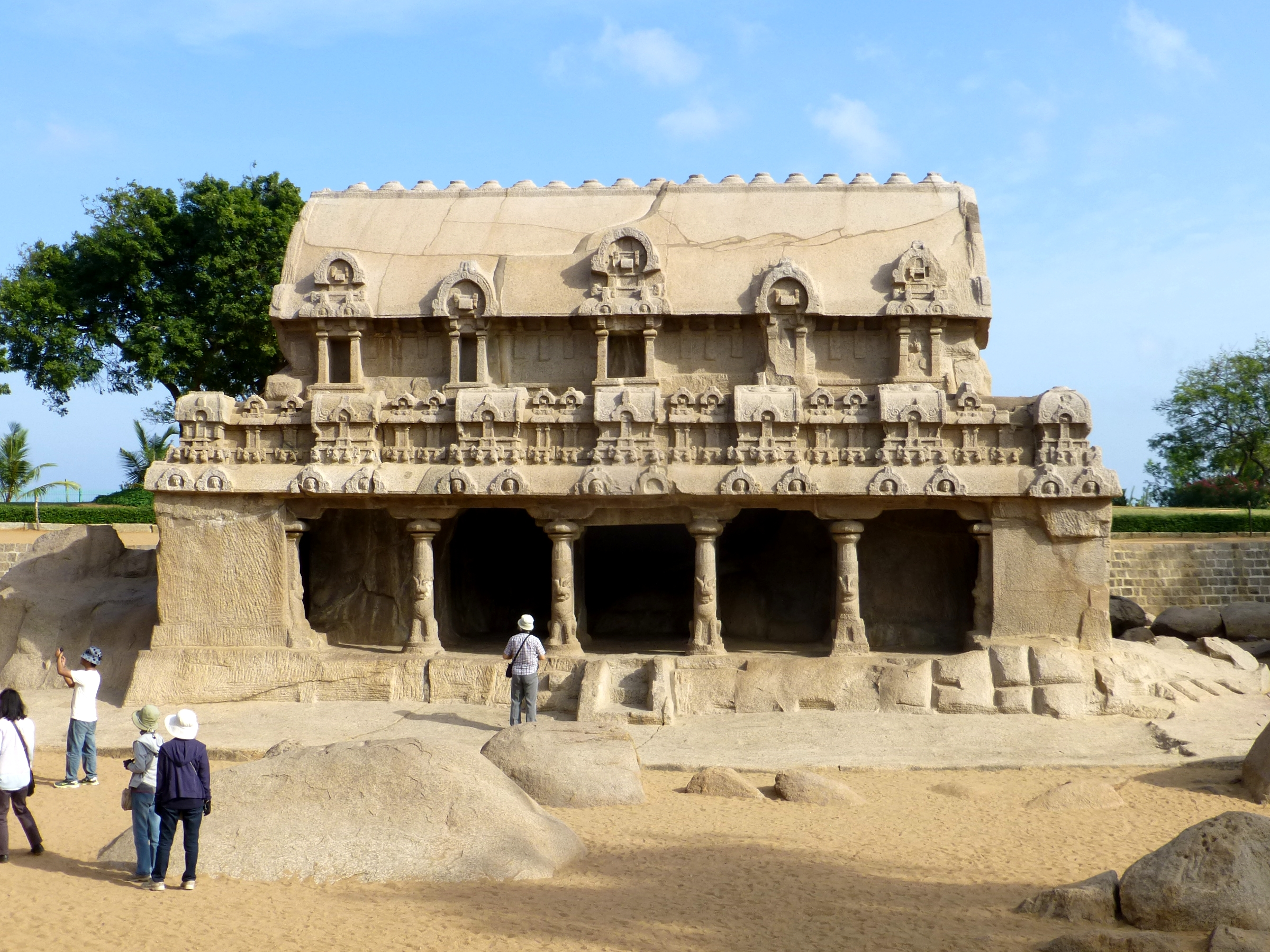
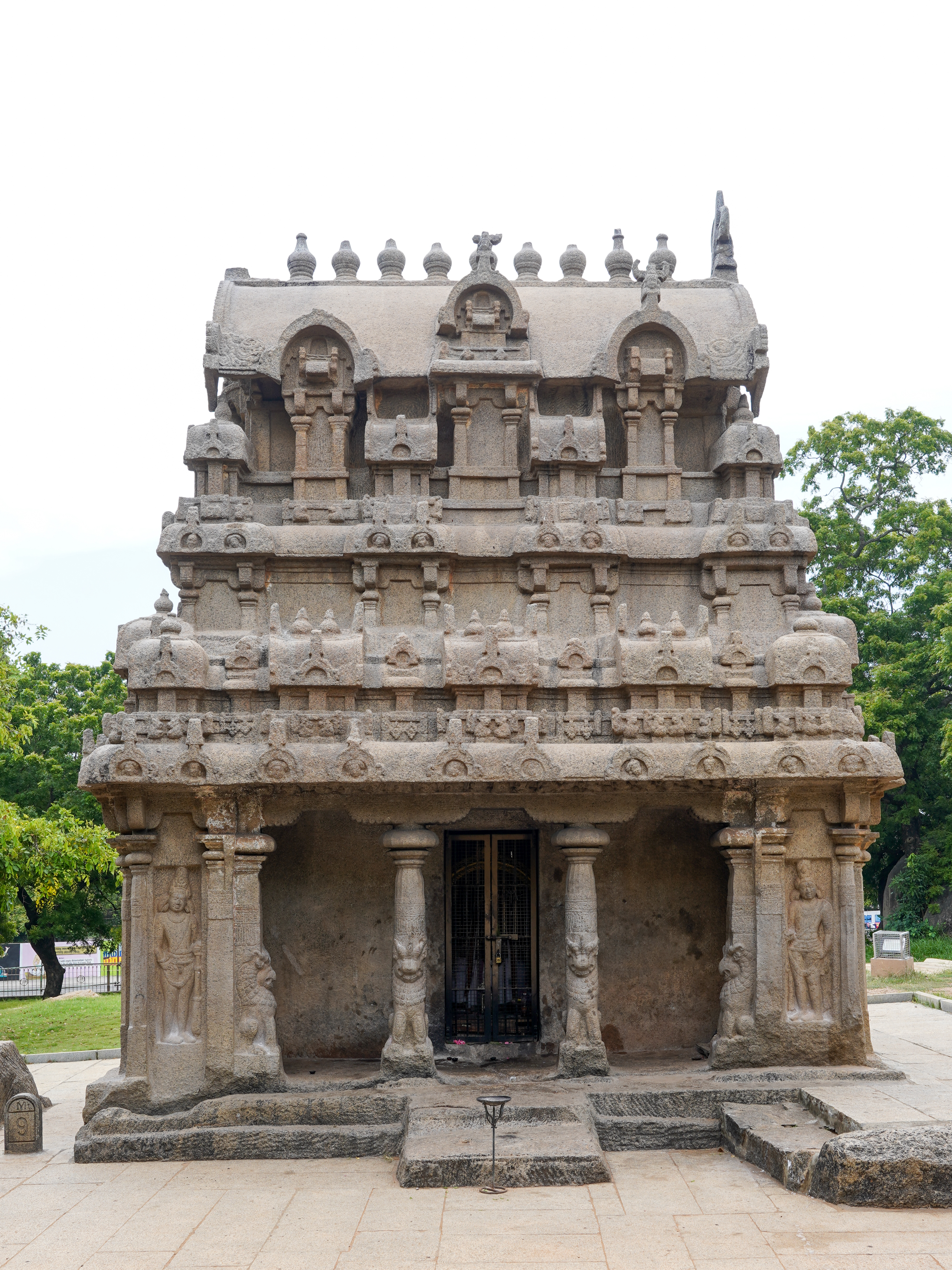
Bhima Ratha and Ganesha Ratha temples at Mahabalipuram, ca, 600s.

By about the 7th century most main features of the Hindu temple were established along with theoretical texts on temple architecture and building methods. From between about the 7th and 13th centuries a large number of temples and their ruins have survived (though far fewer than once existed). Many regional styles developed, very often following political divisions, as large temples were typically built with royal patronage. The Vesara style originated in the region between the Krishna and Tungabhadra rivers that is contemporary north Karnataka. According to some art historians, the roots of Vesara style can be traced to the Chalukyas of Badami (500-753AD) whose Early Chalukya or Badami Chalukya architecture built temples in a style that mixed some features of the nagara and the dravida styles, for example using both the northern shikhara and southern vimana type of superstructure over the sanctum in different temples of similar date, as at Pattadakal. The Badami Chalukya style was further refined by the Rashtrakutas of Manyakheta (750-983AD) in sites such as Ellora. Though there is clearly a good deal of continuity with the Badami or Early Chalukya style, other writers only date the start of Vesara to the later Western Chalukyas of Kalyani (983-1195 AD), in sites such as Lakkundi, Dambal, Itagi, and Gadag, and continued by the Hoysala empire (1000-1330 AD).

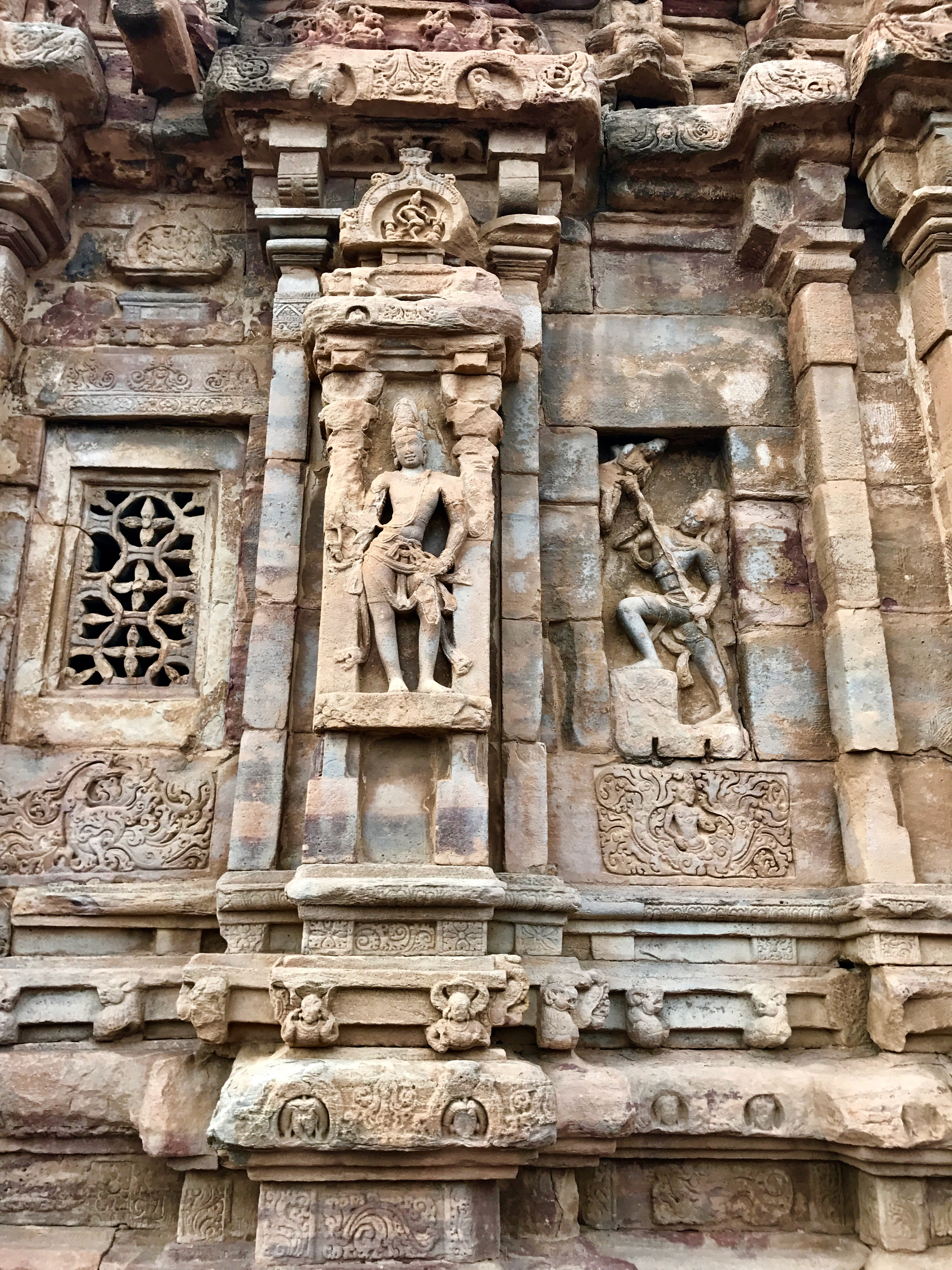
Pattadakal Hindu monuments, 7th-8th century.

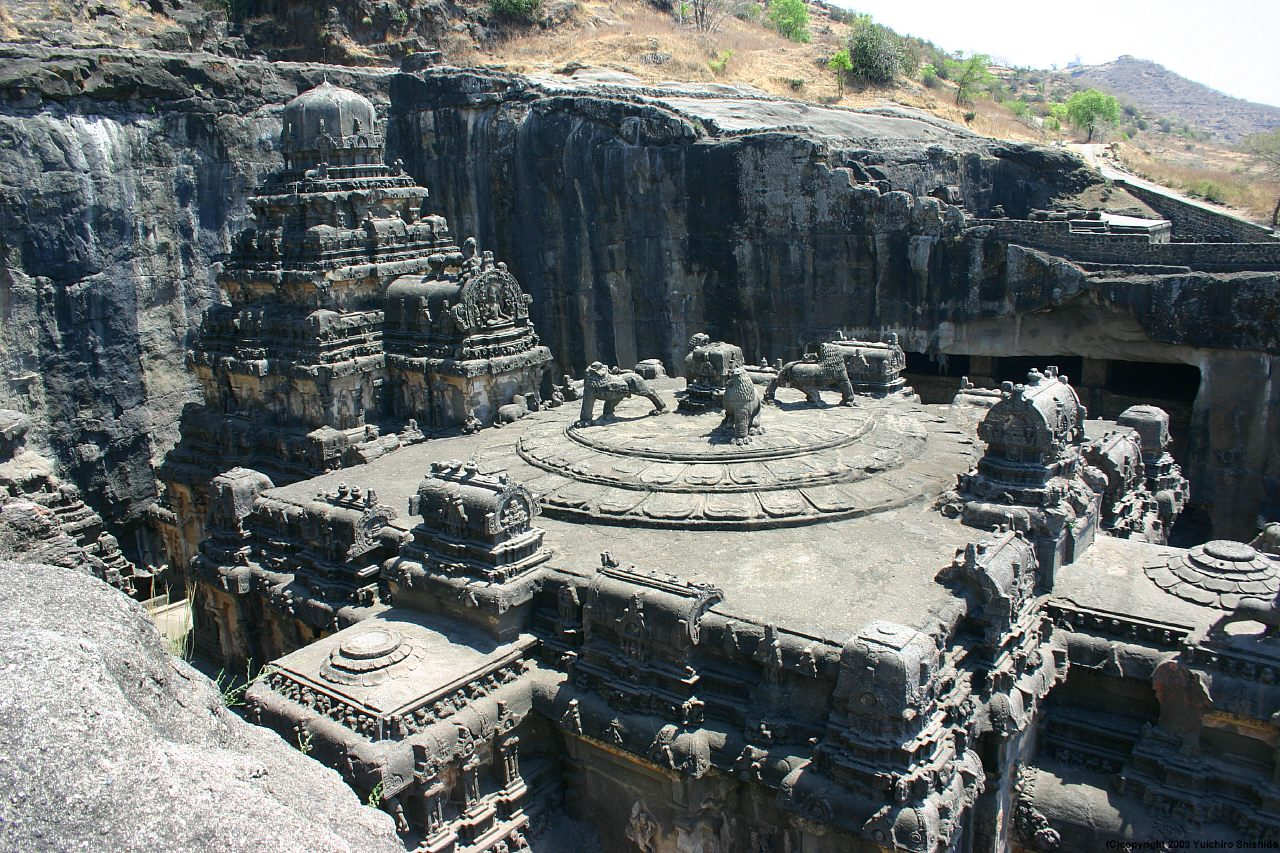
Kailasanatha temple, remarkably carved out of one single rock was built by Rashtrakuta king Krishna I (r. 756–773 CE)

The earliest examples of Pallava architecture are rock-cut temples dating from 610 to 690 CE and structural temples between 690 and 900 CE. The greatest accomplishments of the Pallava architecture are the rock-cut Group of Monuments at Mahabalipuram at Mahabalipuram, a UNESCO World Heritage Site, including the Shore Temple. This group includes both excavated pillared halls, with no external roof except the natural rock, and monolithic shrines where the natural rock is entirely cut away and carved to give an external roof. Early temples were mostly dedicated to Shiva. The Kailasanatha temple also called Rajasimha Pallaveswaram in Kanchipuram built by Narasimhavarman II also known as Rajasimha is a fine example of the Pallava style temple.

Western Chalukya architecture linked between the Badami Chalukya Architecture of the 8th century and the Hoysala architecture popularised in the 13th century. The art of Western Chalukyas is sometimes called the "Gadag style" after the number of ornate temples they built in the Tungabhadra – Krishna River doab region of present-day Gadag district in Karnataka. Their temple building reached its maturity and culmination in the 12th century, with over a hundred temples built across the deccan, more than half of them in present-day Karnataka. Apart from temples they are also well known for ornate stepped wells (Pushkarni) which served as ritual bathing places, many of which are well preserved in Lakkundi. Their stepped well designs were later incorporated by the Hoysalas and the Vijayanagara empire in the coming centuries.

In the north, Muslim invasions from the 11th century onwards reduced the building of temples, and saw the loss of many existing ones. The south also witnessed Hindu-Muslim conflict that affected the temples, but the region was relatively less affected than the north. In late 14th century, the Hindu Vijayanagara Empire came to power and controlled much of South India. During this period, the distinctive very tall gopuram gatehouse, (actually a late development, from the 12th century or later), was typically added to older large temples.

=== Southeast Asian Hindu temples ===
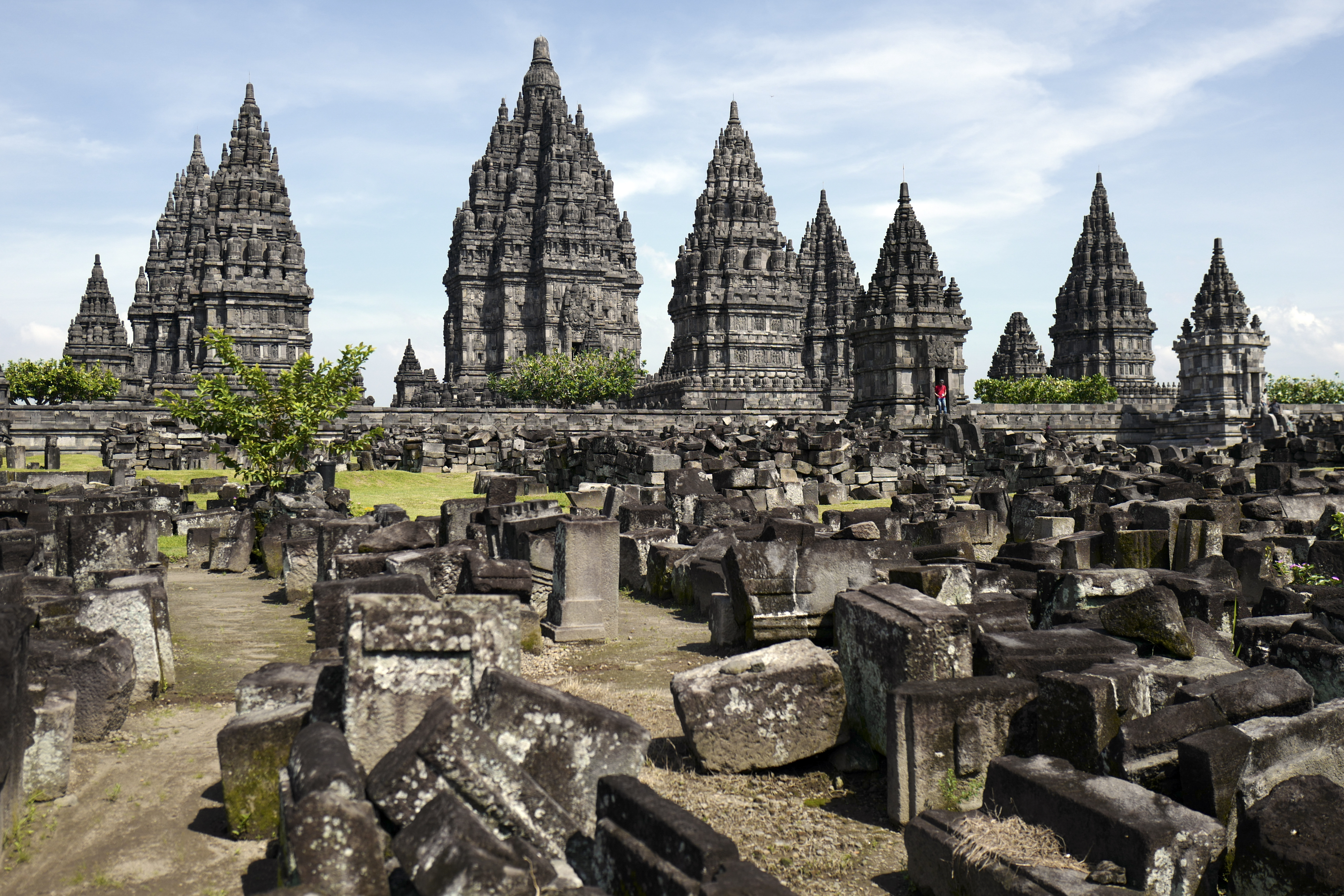
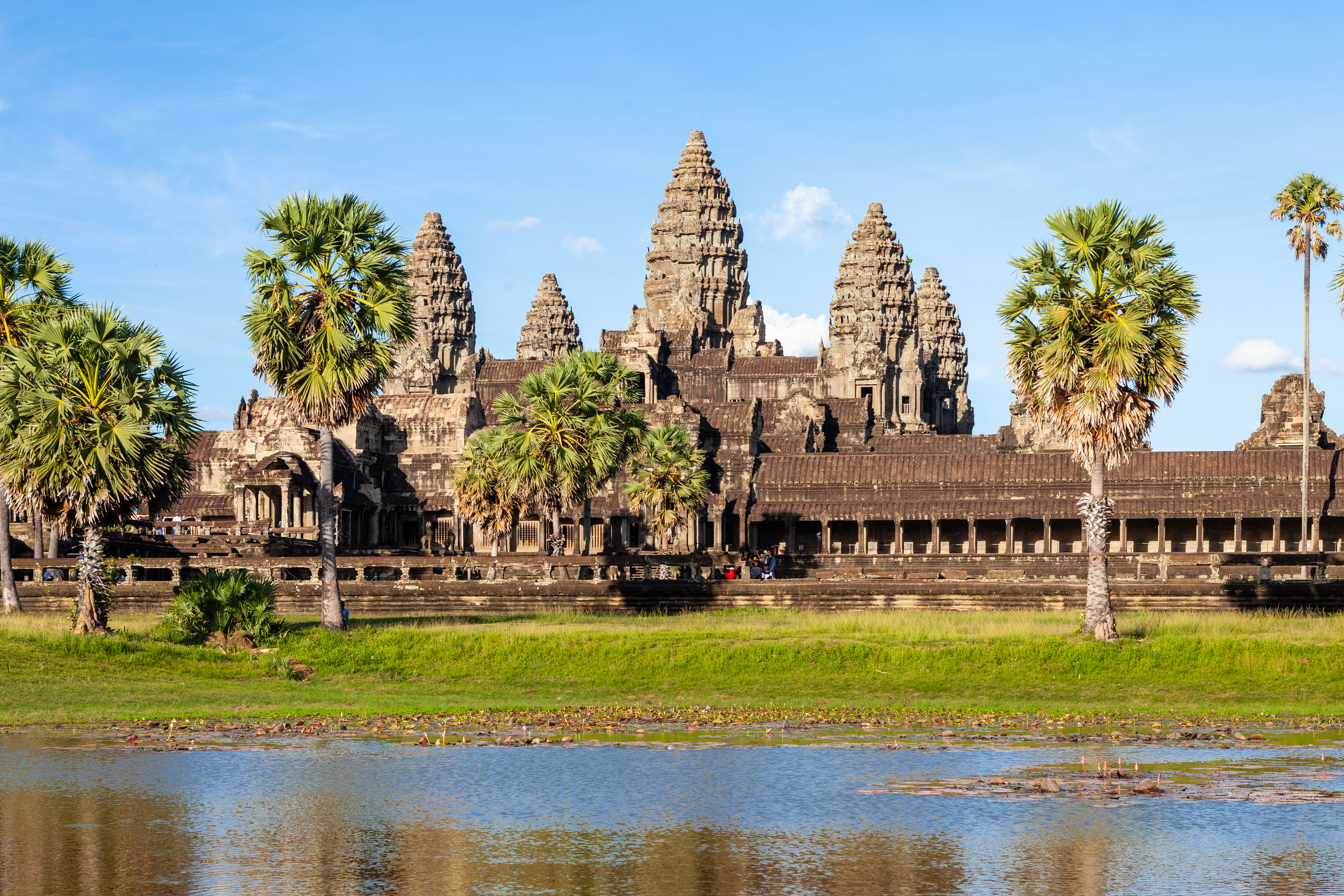
Prambanan in Java, Indonesia (9th century) and Angkor Wat in Cambodia (12th century), examples of Southeast Asian Hindu temple architecture. Both temples were modelled after Mount Meru in Hindu cosmology.

Possibly the oldest Hindu temples in Southeast Asia dates back to 2nd century BCE from the Funan site of Oc Eo in the Mekong Delta. They were probably dedicated to a sun god, Shiva and Vishnu. The temple were constructed using granite blocks and bricks, one with a small stepped pond.

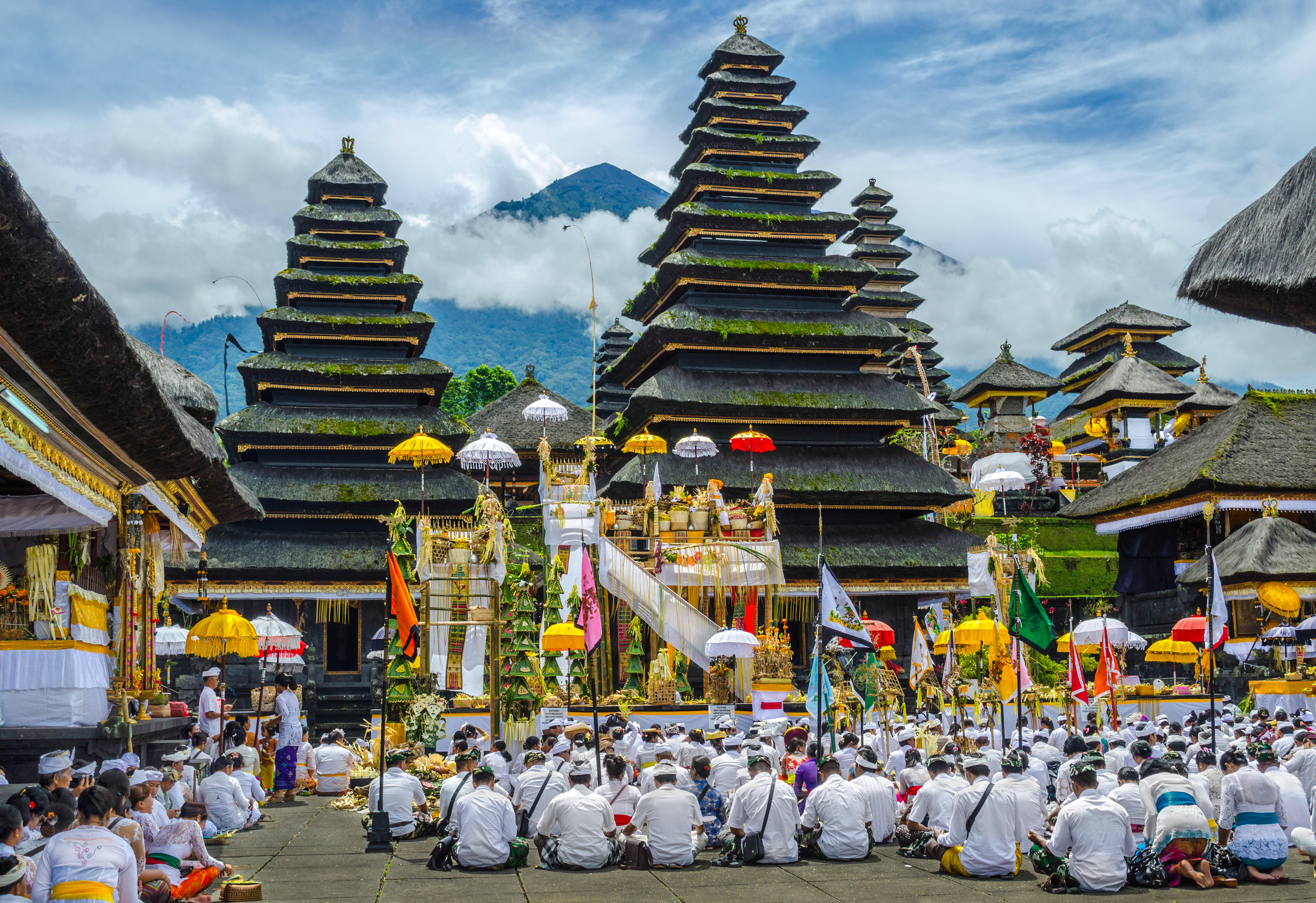
A puja ceremony at Besakih Temple in Bali, Indonesia.

The earliest evidence trace to Sanskrit stone inscriptions found on the islands and the mainland Southeast Asia is the Võ Cạnh inscription of Champa dated to 2nd or 3rd century CE in Vietnam or in Cambodia between the 4th and 5th century CE. (Note: Richard Salomon dates the earliest Cambodian Sanskrit inscriptions to the 5th century.) Prior to the 14th-century local versions of Hindu temples were built in Myanmar, Malaysia, Indonesia, Thailand, Cambodia, Laos and Vietnam. These developed several national traditions, and often mixed Hinduism and Buddhism. Theravada Buddhism prevailed in many parts of the South-East Asia, except Malaysia and Indonesia where Islam displaced them both.

Hindu temples in Southeast Asia developed their own distinct versions, mostly based on Indian architectural models, both North Indian and South Indian styles. However, the Southeast Asian temple architecture styles are different, and there is no known single temple in India that can be the source of the Southeast Asian temples. According to Michell, it is as if the Southeast Asian architects learned from "the theoretical prescriptions about temple building" from Indian texts, but never saw one. They reassembled the elements with their own creative interpretations. The Hindu temples found in Southeast Asia are more conservative and far more strongly link the Mount Meru-related cosmological elements of Indian thought than the Hindu temples found in the subcontinent. Additionally, unlike the Indian temples, the sacred architecture in Southeast Asia associated the ruler (devaraja) with the divine, with the temple serving as a memorial to the king as much as being house of gods. Notable examples of Southeast Asian Hindu temple architecture are the Shivaist Prambanan Trimurti temple compound in Java, Indonesia (9th century), and the Vishnuite Angkor Wat in Cambodia (12th century).

== Design ==
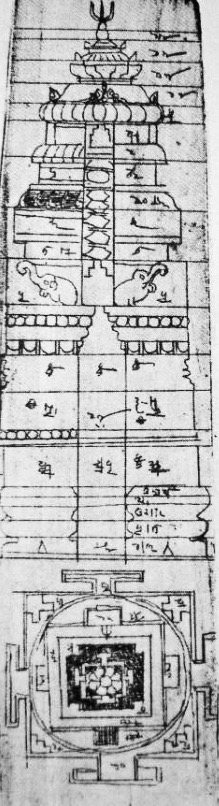
17th-century palm leaf manuscript page on temple building, Odisha.

A Hindu temple is a symmetry-driven structure, with many variations, built on a square grid of padas, depicting perfect geometric shapes such as circles and squares. Susan Lewandowski states that the underlying principle in a Hindu temple is built around the belief that all things are one and that everything is connected. A temple, according to Lewandowski, "replicates again and again the Hindu beliefs in the parts mirroring, and at the same time being, the universal whole" like an "organism of repeating cells". The pilgrim is welcomed through mathematically structured spaces, a network of art, pillars with carvings and statues that display and celebrate the four important and necessary principles of human life—the pursuit of artha (prosperity, wealth), the pursuit of kama (desire), the pursuit of dharma (virtues, ethical life) and the pursuit of moksha (release, self-knowledge).

At the centre of the temple, typically below and sometimes above or next to the deity, is mere hollow space with no decoration, symbolically representing Purusa, the Supreme Principle: the sacred Universal, one without form, which is present everywhere, connects everything, and is the essence of everyone. A Hindu temple is meant to encourage reflection, facilitate the purification of one's mind, and initiate the process of inner realisation within the devotee. The specific process is left to the devotee's particular tradition or school of thought. The primary deity enshrined varies across Hindu temples, reflecting this spiritual spectrum.

=== The site ===
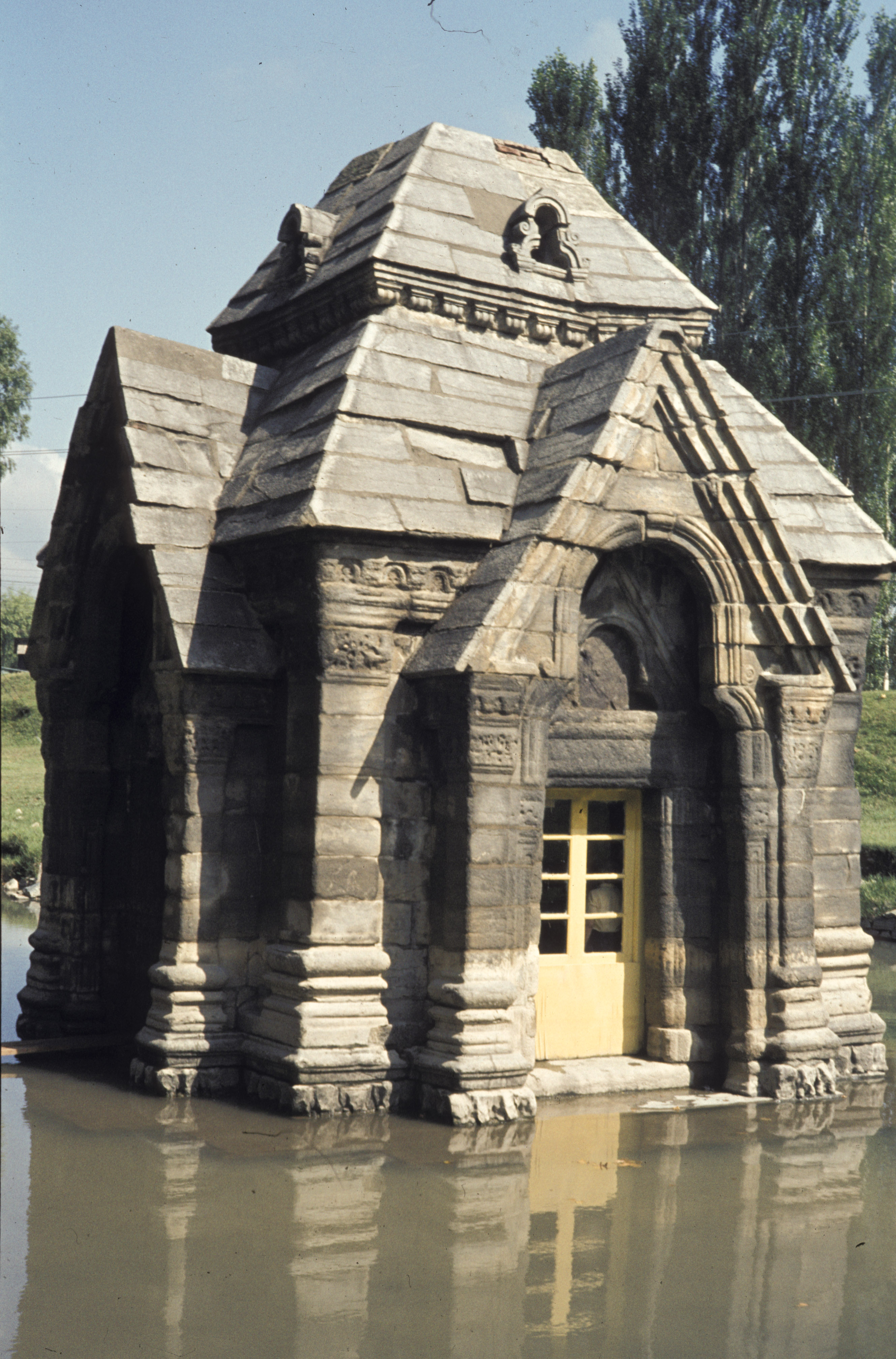
A Shiva Temple at Pandrethan, Kashmir, located in the middle of a spring-fed temple tank.

The appropriate site for a Mandir, suggest ancient Sanskrit texts, is near water and gardens, where lotus and flowers bloom, where swans, ducks and other birds are heard, where animals rest without fear of injury or harm. These harmonious places were recommended in these texts with the explanation that such are the places where gods play, and thus the best site for Hindu temples.

While major Hindu mandirs are recommended at sangams (confluence of rivers), river banks, lakes and seashore, the Brhat Samhita and Puranas suggest temples may also be built where a natural source of water is not present. Here too, they recommend that a pond be built preferably in front or to the left of the temple with water gardens. If water is neither present naturally nor by design, water is symbolically present at the consecration of temple or the deity. Temples may also be built, suggests Visnudharmottara in Part III of Chapter 93, inside caves and carved stones, on hill tops affording peaceful views, mountain slopes overlooking beautiful valleys, inside forests and hermitages, next to gardens, or at the head of a town street.

In practice most temples are built as part of a village or town. Some sites such as the capitals of kingdoms and those considered particularly favourable in terms of sacred geography had numerous temples. Many ancient capitals vanished and the surviving temples are now found in a rural landscape; often these are the best-preserved examples of older styles. Aihole, Badami, Pattadakal and Gangaikonda Cholapuram are examples.

=== The plan ===
The 8×8 (64) grid Manduka Hindu Temple Floor Plan, according to Vastupurusamandala. The 64 grid is the most sacred and common Hindu temple template. The bright saffron centre, where diagonals intersect above, represents the Purusha of Hindu philosophy.

The design, especially the floor plan, of the part of a Hindu temple around the sanctum or shrine follows a geometrical design called vastu-purusha-mandala. The name is a composite Sanskrit word with three of the most important components of the plan. Mandala means circle, Purusha is universal essence at the core of Hindu tradition, while Vastu means the dwelling structure. Vastupurushamandala is a yantra. The design lays out a Hindu temple in a symmetrical, self-repeating structure derived from central beliefs, myths, cardinality and mathematical principles.

The four cardinal directions help create the axis of a Hindu temple, around which is formed a perfect square in the space available. The circle of mandala circumscribes the square. The square is considered divine for its perfection and as a symbolic product of knowledge and human thought, while circle is considered earthly, human and observed in everyday life (moon, sun, horizon, water drop, rainbow). Each supports the other. The square is divided into perfect square grids. In large temples, this is often a 8×8 or 64-grid structure. In ceremonial temple superstructures, this is an 81 sub-square grid. The squares are called padas. The square is symbolic and has Vedic origins from fire altar, Agni. The alignment along cardinal direction, similarly is an extension of Vedic rituals of three fires. This symbolism is also found among Greek and other ancient civilisations, through the gnomon. In Hindu temple manuals, design plans are described with 1, 4, 9, 16, 25, 36, 49, 64, 81 up to 1024 squares; 1 pada is considered the simplest plan, as a seat for a hermit or devotee to sit and meditate on, do yoga, or make offerings with Vedic fire in front. The second design of 4 padas has a symbolic central core at the diagonal intersection, and is also a meditative layout. The 9 pada design has a sacred surrounded centre, and is the template for the smallest temple. Older Hindu temple vastumandalas may use the 9 through 49 pada series, but 64 is considered the most sacred geometric grid in Hindu temples. It is also called Manduka, Bhekapada or Ajira in various ancient Sanskrit texts. Each pada is conceptually assigned to a symbolic element, sometimes in the form of a deity or to a spirit or apasara. The central square(s) of the 64 is dedicated to the Brahman (not to be confused with Brahmin), and are called Brahma padas.

In a Hindu temple's structure of symmetry and concentric squares, each concentric layer has significance. The outermost layer, Paisachika padas, signify aspects of Asuras and evil; the next inner concentric layer is Manusha padas signifying human life; while Devika padas signify aspects of Devas and good. The Manusha padas typically houses the ambulatory. The devotees, as they walk around in clockwise fashion through this ambulatory to complete Parikrama (or Pradakshina), walk between good on inner side and evil on the outer side. In smaller temples, the Paisachika pada is not part of the temple superstructure, but may be on the boundary of the temple or just symbolically represented.

The Paisachika padas, Manusha padas and Devika padas surround Brahma padas, which signifies creative energy and serves as the location for temple's primary idol for darsana. Finally at the very centre of Brahma padas is Garbhagruha(Garbha- Centre, gruha- house; literally the centre of the house) (Purusa Space), signifying Universal Principle present in everything and everyone. The spire of a Hindu temple, called Shikhara in north India and Vimana in south India, is perfectly aligned above the Brahma pada(s).

A Hindu temple has a Shikhara (Vimana or Spire) that rises symmetrically above the central core of the temple. These spires come in many designs and shapes, but they all have mathematical precision and geometric symbolism. One of the common principles found in Hindu temple spires is circles and turning-squares theme (left), and a concentric layering design (right) that flows from one to the other as it rises towards the sky.

Beneath the mandala's central square(s) is the space for the formless shapeless all pervasive all connecting Universal Spirit, the Purusha. This space is sometimes referred to as garbha-griya (literally womb house) – a small, perfect square, windowless, enclosed space without ornamentation that represents universal essence. In or near this space is typically a murti. This is the main deity image, and this varies with each temple. Often it is this idol that gives it a local name, such as Vishnu temple, Krishna temple, Rama temple, Narayana temple, Siva temple, Lakshmi temple, Ganesha temple, Durga temple, Hanuman temple, Surya temple, and others. It is this garbha-griya which devotees seek for darsana (literally, a sight of knowledge, or vision).

Above the vastu-purusha-mandala is a high superstructure called the shikhara in north India, and vimana in south India, that stretches towards the sky. Sometimes, in makeshift temples, the superstructure may be replaced with symbolic bamboo with few leaves at the top. The vertical dimension's cupola or dome is designed as a pyramid, conical or other mountain-like shape, once again using principle of concentric circles and squares (see below). Scholars such as Lewandowski state that this shape is inspired by cosmic mountain of Mount Meru or Himalayan Kailasa, the abode of gods according to its ancient mythology.

In larger temples, the outer three padas are visually decorated with carvings, paintings or images meant to inspire the devotee. In some temples, these images or wall reliefs may be stories from Hindu Epics, in others they may be Vedic tales about right and wrong or virtues and vice, in some they may be idols of minor or regional deities. The pillars, walls and ceilings typically also have highly ornate carvings or images of the four just and necessary pursuits of life—kama, artha, dharma, and moksa. This walk around is called pradakshina.

Large temples also have pillared halls called mandapa. One on the east side, serves as the waiting room for pilgrims and devotees. The mandapa may be a separate structure in older temples, but in newer temples this space is integrated into the temple superstructure. Mega temple sites have a main temple surrounded by smaller temples and shrines, but these are still arranged by principles of symmetry, grids and mathematical precision. An important principle found in the layout of Hindu temples is mirroring and repeating fractal-like design structure, each unique yet also repeating the central common principle, one which Susan Lewandowski refers to as "an organism of repeating cells".

Exceptions to the square grid principle

Predominant number of Hindu temples exhibit the perfect square grid principle. However, there are some exceptions. For example, the Teli ka Mandir in Gwalior, built in the 8th century CE is not a square but is a rectangle consisting of stacked squares. Further, the temple explores a number of structures and shrines in 1:1, 1:2, 1:3, 2:5, 3:5 and 4:5 ratios. These ratios are exact, suggesting the architect intended to use these harmonic ratios, and the rectangle pattern was not a mistake, nor an arbitrary approximation. Other examples of non-square harmonic ratios are found at Naresar temple site of Madhya Pradesh and Nakti-Mata temple near Jaipur, Rajasthan. Michael Meister states that these exceptions mean the ancient Sanskrit manuals for temple building were guidelines, and Hinduism permitted its artisans flexibility in expression and aesthetic independence.

The Hindu text Sthapatya Veda describes many plans and styles of temples of which the following are found in other derivative literature: Chaturasra (square), Ashtasra (octagonal), Vritta (circular), Ayatasra (rectangular), Ayata Ashtasra (rectangular-octagonal fusion), Ayata Vritta (elliptical), Hasti Prishta (apsidal), Dvayasra Vrita (rectangular-circular fusion); in Tamil literature, the Prana Vikara (shaped like a Tamil Om sign,) is also found. Methods of combining squares and circles to produce all of these plans are described in the Hindu texts.

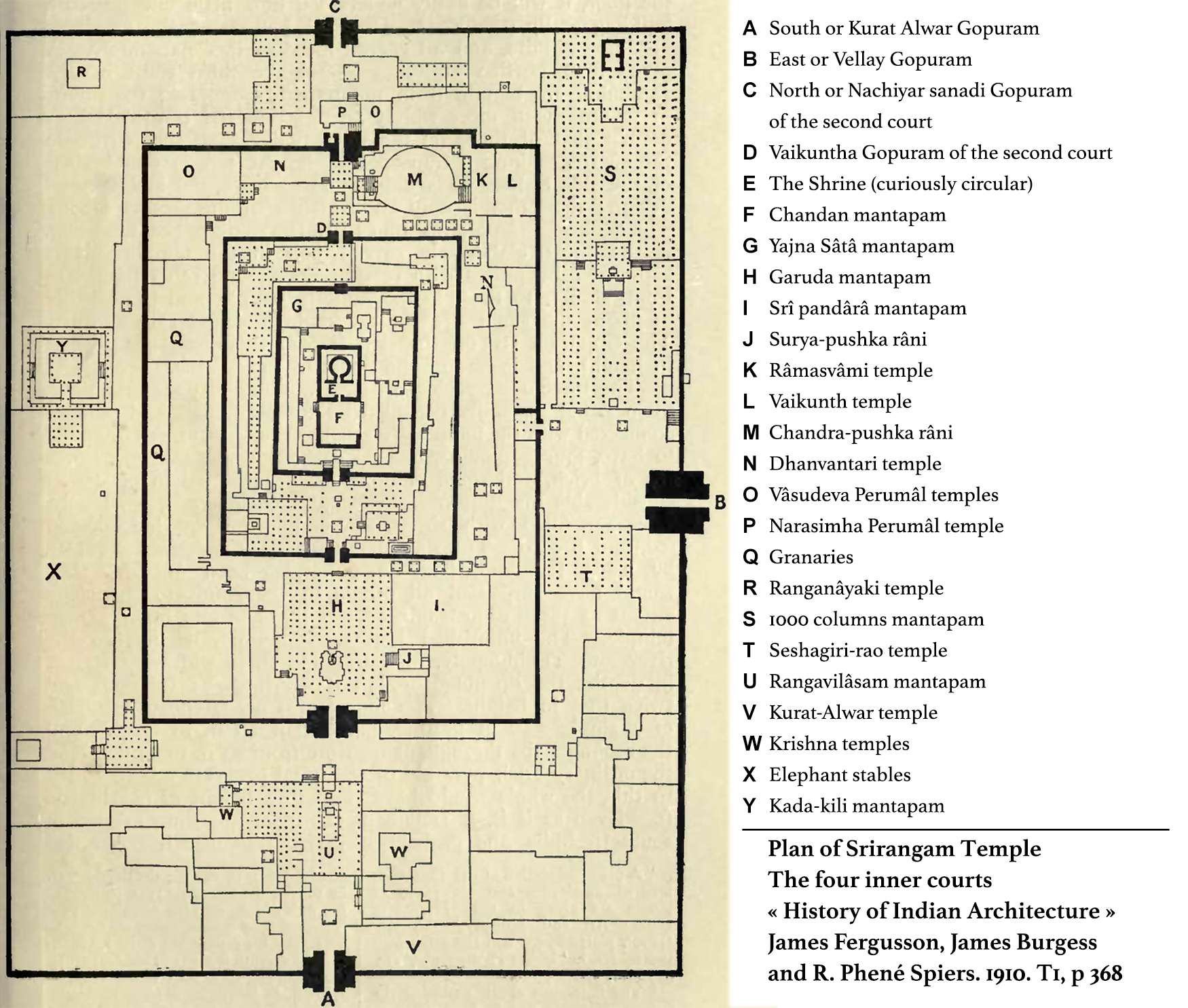
Srirangam Ranganathaswamy temple, cross section and plan (1910 sketch).

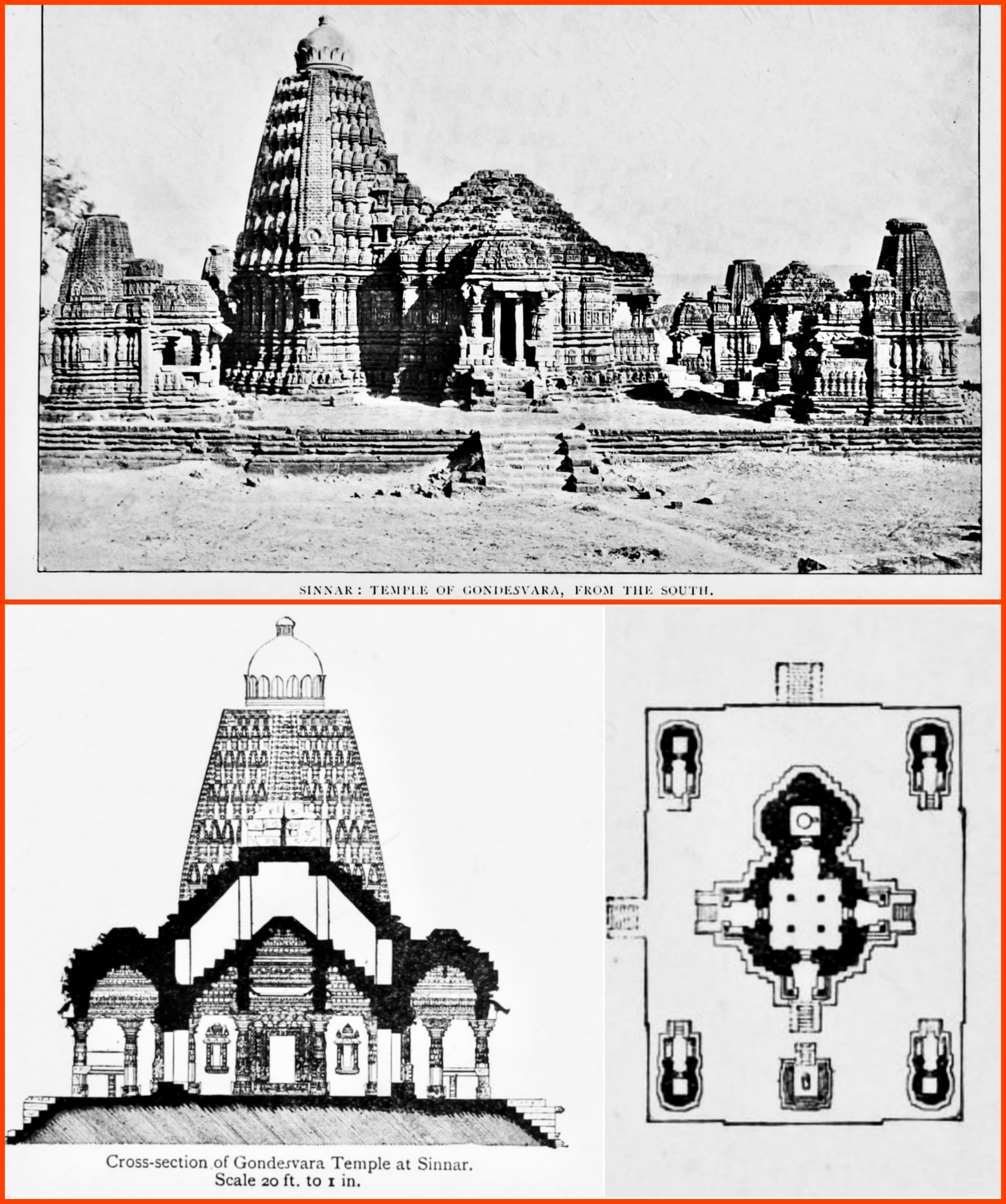
Nashik Maharashtra temple, cross section and plan (1910 sketch)

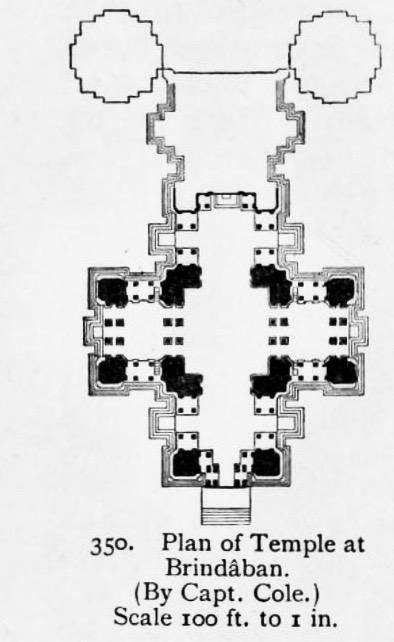
Vrindavan Uttar Pradesh temple plan

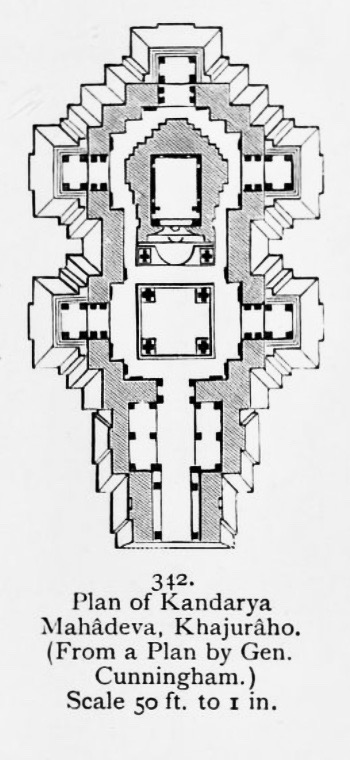
Khajuraho Madhya Pradesh temple plan

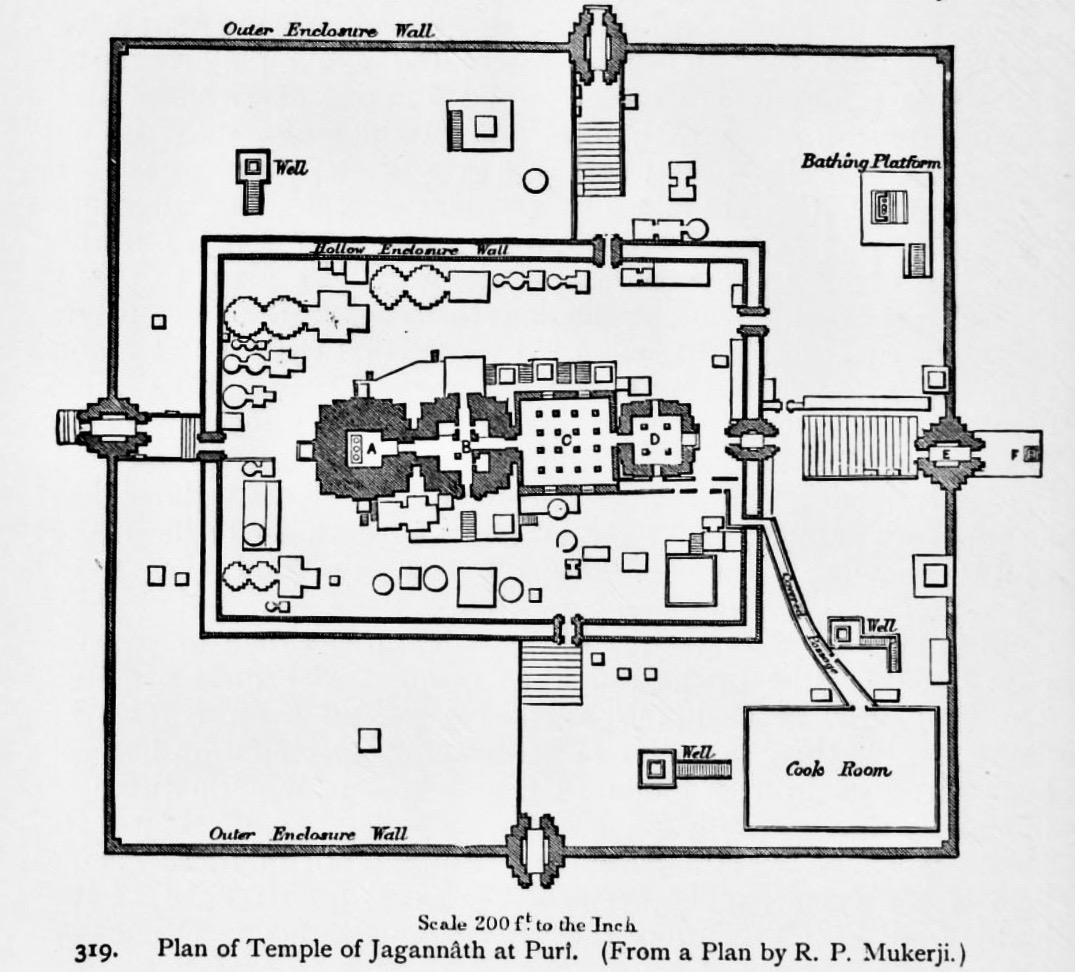
Puri Odisha temple complex plan

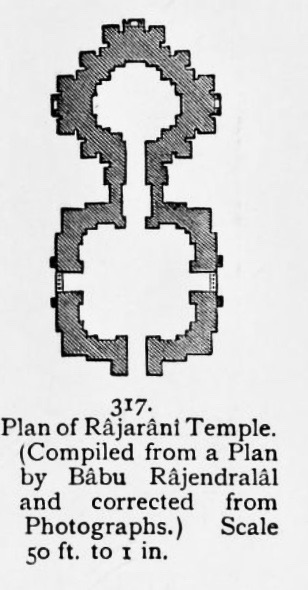
Bhubneshwar Odisha, a smaller temple plan

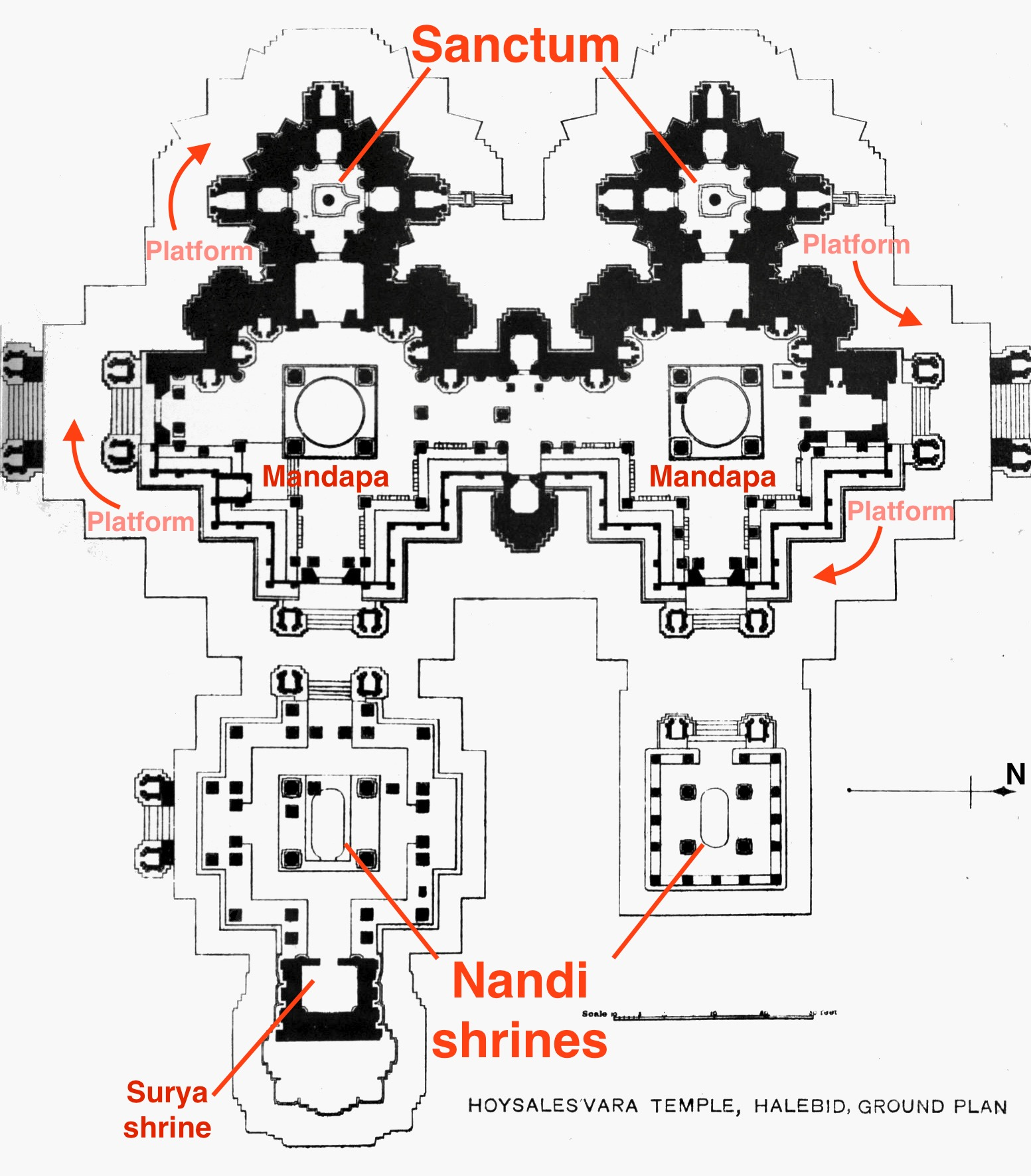
Halebidu Karnataka temple plan

Chidambaram Tamil Nadu temple plan

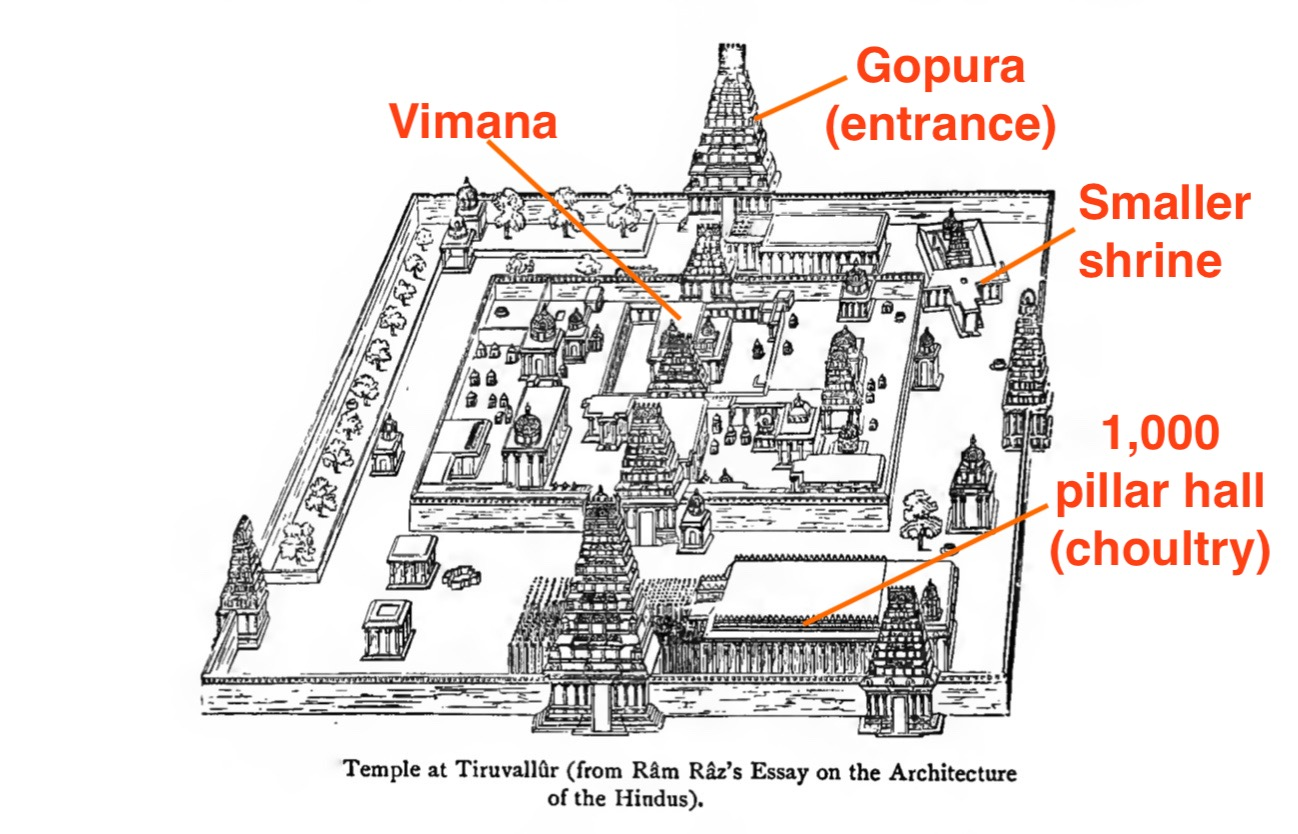
Thiruvallur Sri Veera Raghavaswamy temple, Tamil Hindu temple complex.

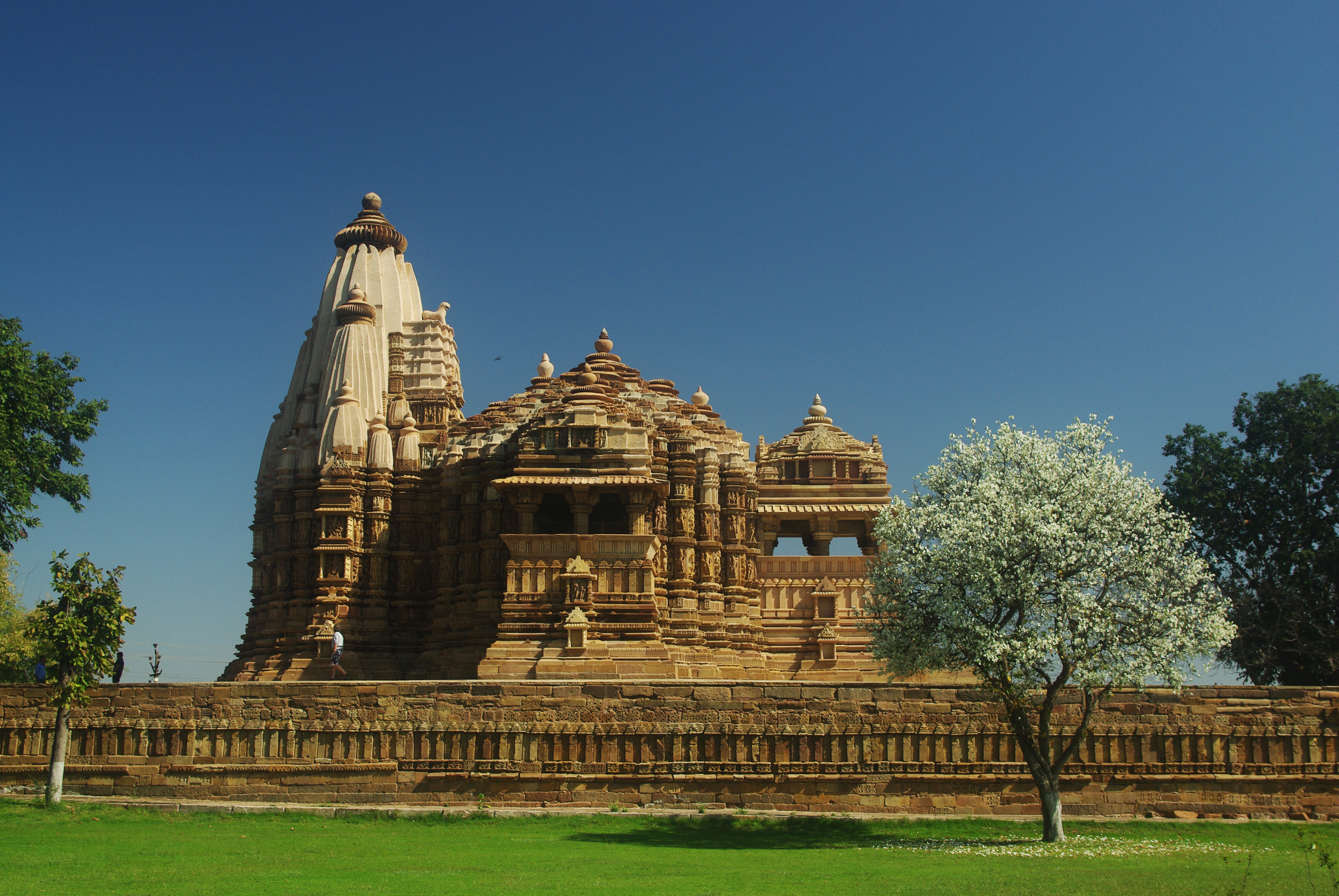
Mandapa and Shikara of Khajuraho Group of Monuments, ca. 885 CE and 1000 CE.

== The builders ==
The temples were built by guilds of architects, artisans and workmen. Their knowledge and craft traditions, states Michell, were originally preserved by the oral tradition, later with palm-leaf manuscripts. The building tradition was typically transmitted within families from one generation to the next, and this knowledge was jealously guarded. The guilds were like a corporate body that set rules of work and standard wages. These guilds over time became wealthy, and themselves made charitable donations as evidenced by inscriptions. The guilds covered almost every aspect of life in the camps around the site where the workmen lived during the period of construction, which in the case of large projects might be several years.

The work was led by a chief architect (sutradhara). The construction superintendent was equal in his authority. Other important members were stonemason chief and the chief image-maker who collaborated to complete a temple. The sculptors were called shilpins. Women participated in temple building, but in lighter work such as polishing stones and clearing. Hindu texts are inconsistent about which caste did the construction work, with some texts accepting all castes to work as a shilpin. The Brahmins were the experts in art theory and guided the workmen when needed. They also performed consecration rituals of the superstructure and in the sanctum.

In the earliest periods of Hindu art, from about the 4th century to about the 10th century, the artists had considerable freedom and this is evidenced in the considerable variations and innovations in images crafted and temple designs. Later, much of this freedom was lost as iconography became more standardised and the demand for iconometry consistency increased. This "presumably reflected the influence of Brahman theologians" states Michell, and the "increasing dependence of the artist upon the brahmins" on suitable forms of sacred images. The "individual pursuit of self-expression" in a temple project was not allowed and instead, the artist expressed the sacred values in the visual form through a temple, for the most part anonymously.

The sponsors used contracts for the building tasks. Though great masters probably had assistants to help complete principal images in a temple, the reliefs panels in a Hindu temple were "almost certainly the inspiration of a single artist".

=== Schools of temple building tradition ===
Along with guilds, surviving texts suggest that several schools of Hindu temple architecture had developed in ancient India. Each school developed its own gurukuls (study centres) and texts. Of these, state Bharne and Krusche, two became most prominent: the Vishwakarma school and the Maya (Devanagari: मय not to be pronounced as Maayaa) school. The Vishwakarma school is credited with treatises, terminology and innovations related to the Nagara style of architecture, while the Maya school with those related to the Dravida style. The style now called Vesara bridges and combines elements of the Nagara and the Dravida styles, it probably reflects one of the other extinct schools.

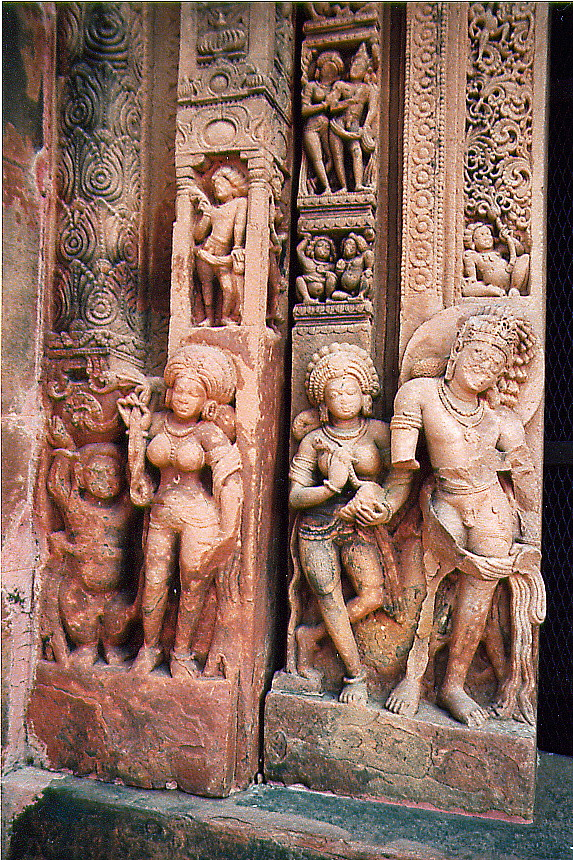
Dashavatara temple sculpture at Deogarh, completed about 500 CE.

Some scholars have questioned the relevance of these texts, whether the artists relied on śilpa śāstras theory and Sanskrit construction manuals probably written by Brahmins, and did these treatises precede or follow the big temples and ancient sculptures therein. Other scholars question whether big temples and complex symmetric architecture or sculpture with consistent themes and common iconography across distant sites, over many centuries, could have been built by artists and architects without adequate theory, shared terminology and tools, and if so how. According to Adam Hardy – an architecture historian and professor of Asian Architecture, the truth "must lie somewhere in between". According to George Michell – an art historian and professor specialising in Hindu Architecture, the theory and the creative field practice likely co-evolved, and the construction workers and artists building complex temples likely consulted the theoreticians when they needed to.

== Styles ==
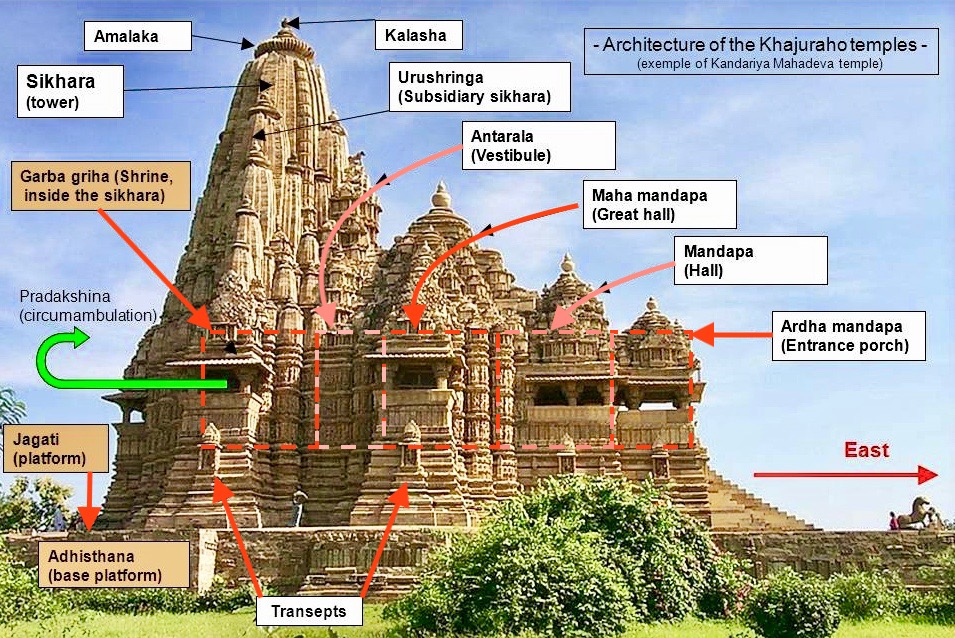
Architecture of the Khajuraho temples

The ancient Hindu texts on architecture such as Brihatsamhita and others, states Michell, classify temples into five orders based on their typological features: Nagara, Dravida, Vesara, ellipse and rectangle. The plan described for each include square, octagonal and apsidal. Their horizontal plan regulates the vertical form. Each temple architecture in turn has developed its own vocabulary, with terms that overlap but do not necessarily mean exactly the same thing in another style and may apply to a different part of the temple. Following a general historical division, the early Hindu temples, up to the 7th or 8th century, are often called classical or ancient temples, while those after the classical period to the 12th or 13th century are sometimes referred to as medieval. However, this division does not reflect a major break in Hindu architecture, which continued to evolve gradually across these periods. In the Mithila region of the Indian subcontinent, a unique architectural style of Hindu temples, was identified by the American archeologist D B Spooner. In the 19th century, during his survey and studies regarding the architectural aspect of the temples in the region, he noticed the unique architectural style prevalent in the Mithila region and recognised its identification as Tirhut style temples. These temples were commissioned by the kings in the region.

The style of Hindu temple architecture is not only the result of the theology, spiritual ideas, and the early Hindu texts but also a result of innovation driven by regional availability of raw materials and the local climate. Some materials of construction were imported from distant regions, but much of the temples were built from readily available materials. In some regions, such as in South Karnataka, the local availability of soft stone led to Hoysala architects to innovate architectural styles that are difficult with hard crystalline rocks. In other places, artists used to cut granite or other stones to build temples and create sculptures. Rock faces allowed artists to carve cave temples or a region's rocky terrain encouraged monolithic rock-cut temple architecture. In regions where stones were unavailable, brick temples flourished. Hindu temple architecture has historically been affected by the building material available in each region, its "tonal value, texture and structural possibilities" states Michell.

=== India ===
==== Dravidian architecture ====
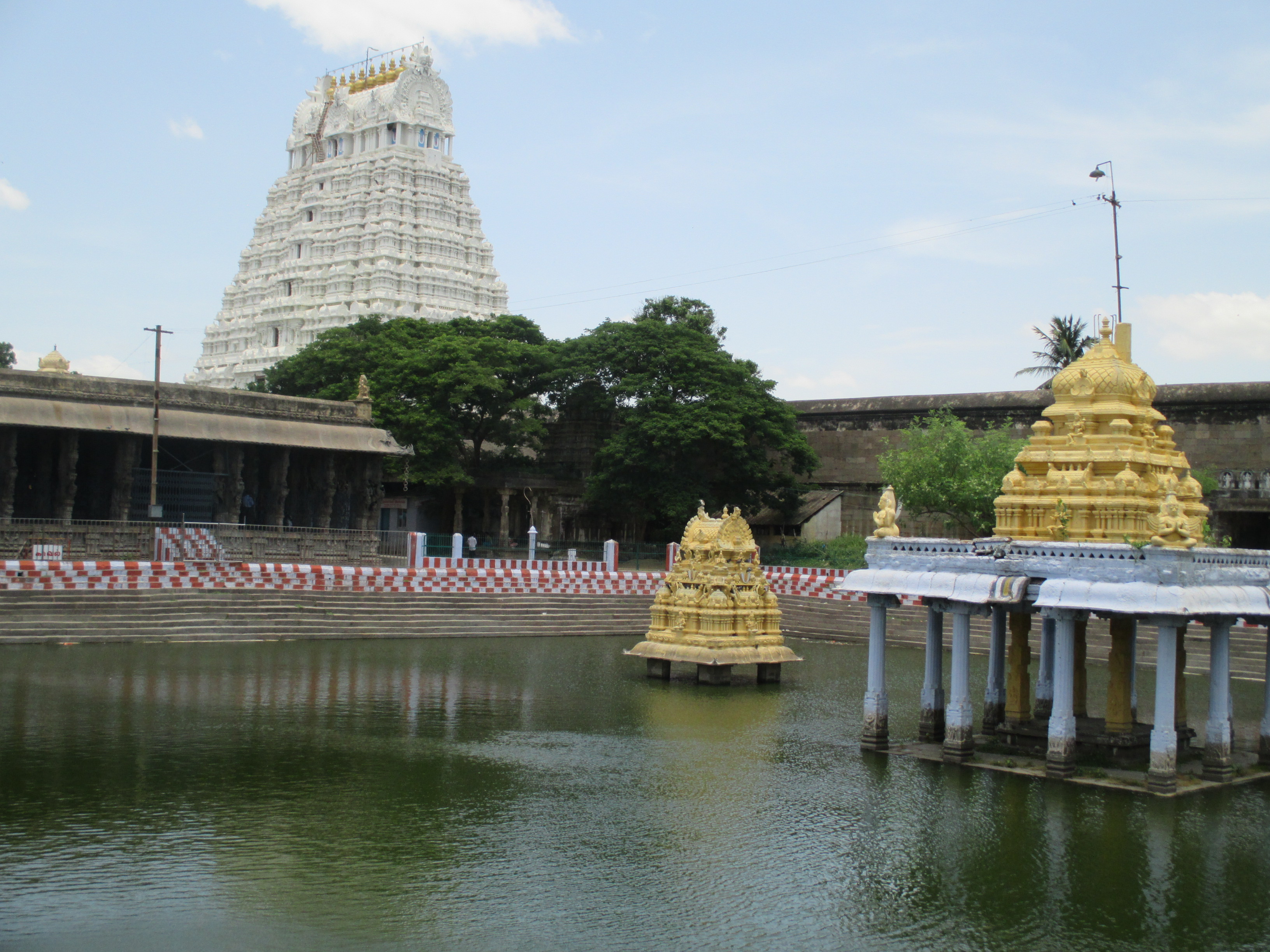
Kanchipuram Varadaraja Peruma temple's Gopuram and the temple tank Anandasaras Pushkarini

Dravidian architecture is an architectural idiom in Hindu temple architecture that emerged from South India, reaching its final form by the 1500 CE. It is seen in Hindu temples, and the most distinctive difference from north Indian styles is the use of a shorter and more pyramidal tower over the garbhagriha or sanctuary called a vimana, where the north has taller towers, usually bending inwards as they rise, called shikhara. However, for modern visitors to larger temples the dominating feature is the high Gopura or gatehouse at the edge of the compound; large temples have several, dwarfing the vimana; these are a much more recent development. There are numerous other distinct features such as the dvarapalakas – twin guardians at the main entrance and the inner sanctum of the temple and goshtams – deities carved in niches on the outer side walls of the garbhagriha.

Mentioned as one of three styles of temple building in the ancient book Vastu shastra, the majority of the existing structures are located in the Southern Indian states of Karnataka, Tamil Nadu, Kerala, Andhra Pradesh, Telangana, some parts of Maharashtra, Odisha and Sri Lanka. Various kingdoms and empires such as the Satavahanas, the Vakatakas of Vidarbha, the Cholas, the Chera, the Kakatiyas, the Reddis, the Pandyas, the Pallavas, the Gangas, the Kadambas, the Rashtrakutas, the Chalukyas, the Hoysalas and Vijayanagara Empire among others have made substantial contribution to the evolution of the Dravida architecture.

==== Dravida and Nagara architecture ====
Of the different styles of temple architecture in India, the Nagara architecture of northern India and the Dravidian architecture of southern India are most common. Other styles are also found. For example, the rainy climate and the materials of construction available in Bengal, Kerala, Java and Bali Indonesia have influenced the evolutions of styles and structures in these regions. At other sites such as Ellora and Pattadakal, adjacent temples may have features drawing from different traditions, as well as features in a common style local to that region and period. In modern era literature, many styles have been named after the royal dynasties in whose territories they were built.

Feature	Nagara architecture	Vesara architecture	Dravida architecture	Reference
Main temple spire (tower)	Shikhara above sanctum		Vimana that may be multistorey (talas), the top of which is called the shikhara	
Mandapa spire (tower)	Yes		No	
Curvature of the spire	Curvilinear centred over the sanctum, also straight-edged pyramidal		Straight-edged pyramidal, sometimes curvilinear centred over the sanctum (Note: In rare cases, such as the Brihadishvara temple at Gangaikondacholapuram, the centre is outside the temple.)	
Sanctum	Single or multi-storey		Typically single (Vimana may be multi-storey)	
Plan	Mandapa, sanctum and tower plans are predominantly Chaturasra (square); uncommon: Ashtasra, Vritta, Ayatasra, Ayata Ashtasra, Ayata Vritta, Hasti Prishta, Dvayasra Vrita		Same, plus Prana Vikara	
Gopuram	Not a prominent feature		Characteristic, but not essential; after 10th century often higher than the vimana. May be several, on all sides of the compound, serving as landmarks for pilgrims	
Other features	Sacred pools, fewer pillared mandapas in temple grounds (separate dharmashala), prakara walls rare (e.g. Odisha after 14th century), single or multiple entrances into temple		Sacred pools, many pillared mandapas in temple grounds (used for rites of passage ceremonies, choultry, temple rituals), prakara walls became common after 14th century, single or multiple entrances into temple	
Major sub-styles	Latina, Phamsana, Sekhari, Valabhi		Tamil (upper and lower Dravidadesa), Karnata, Andhra, Kerala	
Geography	Northern, western and central of the Indian subcontinent		Southern parts of the Indian subcontinent, southeast Asia	
Chronology of surviving stone-masonry monuments	Late Kushana era, early Gupta: rudimentary archaic; 6th-10th century: zenith		Late Gupta era: rudimentary; 6th-10th century: zenith	

==== Regional styles ====
The architecture of the rock-cut temples, particularly the rathas, became a model for south Indian temples. Architectural features, particularly the sculptures, were widely adopted in South Indian, Cambodian, Annamese and Javanese temples. Descendants of the sculptors of the shrines are artisans in contemporary Mahabalipuram.

===== Badami Chalukya architecture =====
The Badami Chalukya Architecture style originated by 5th century in Aihole and was perfected in Pattadakal and Badami.

Chalukya Architecture of temples at Aihole and Pattadakal

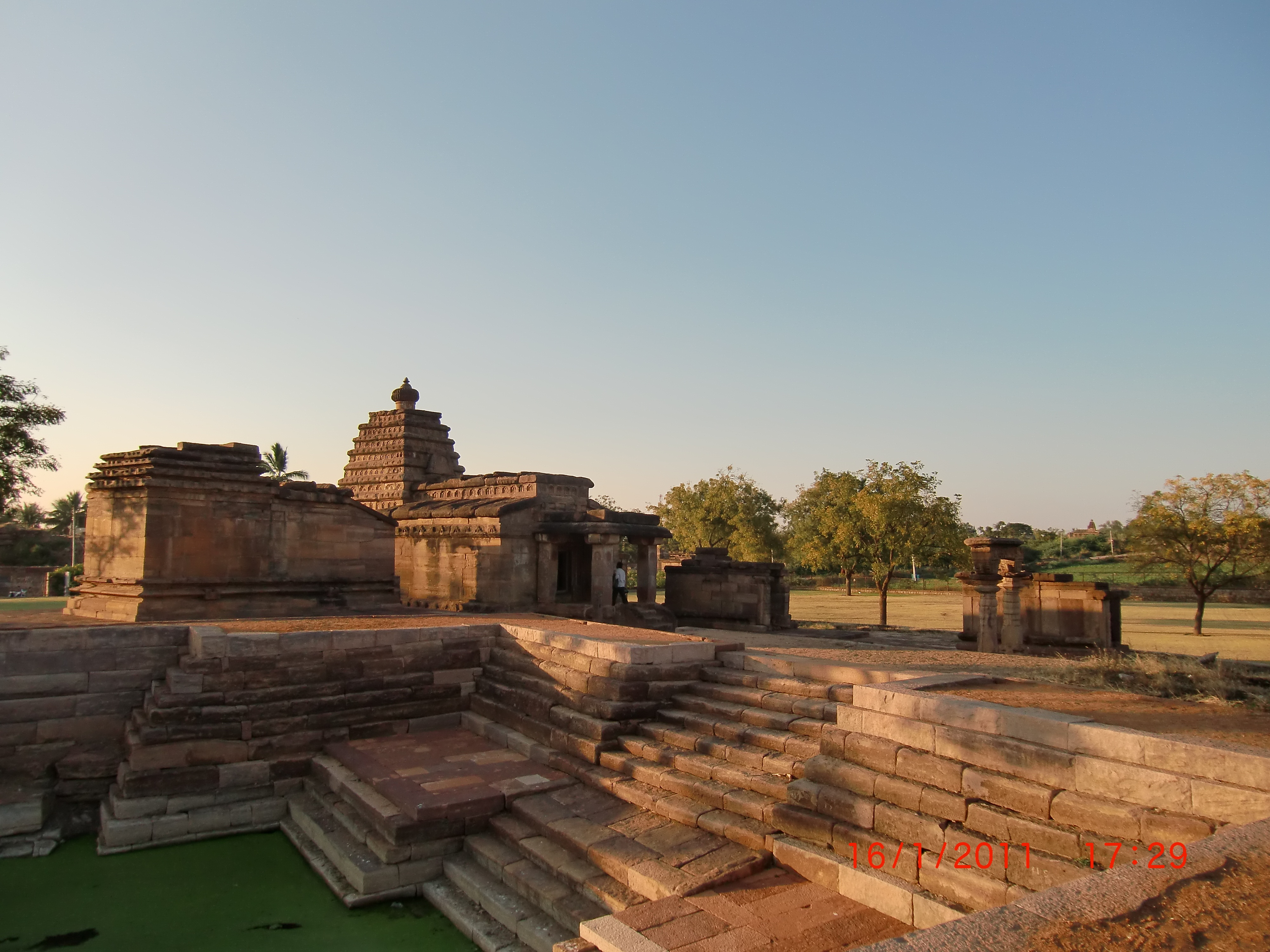
Mallikarjuna temple complex at Aihole, is a historic site of ancient and medieval era Buddhist, Hindu and Jain monuments in north Karnataka, India dated from the sixth century through the twelfth century CE.

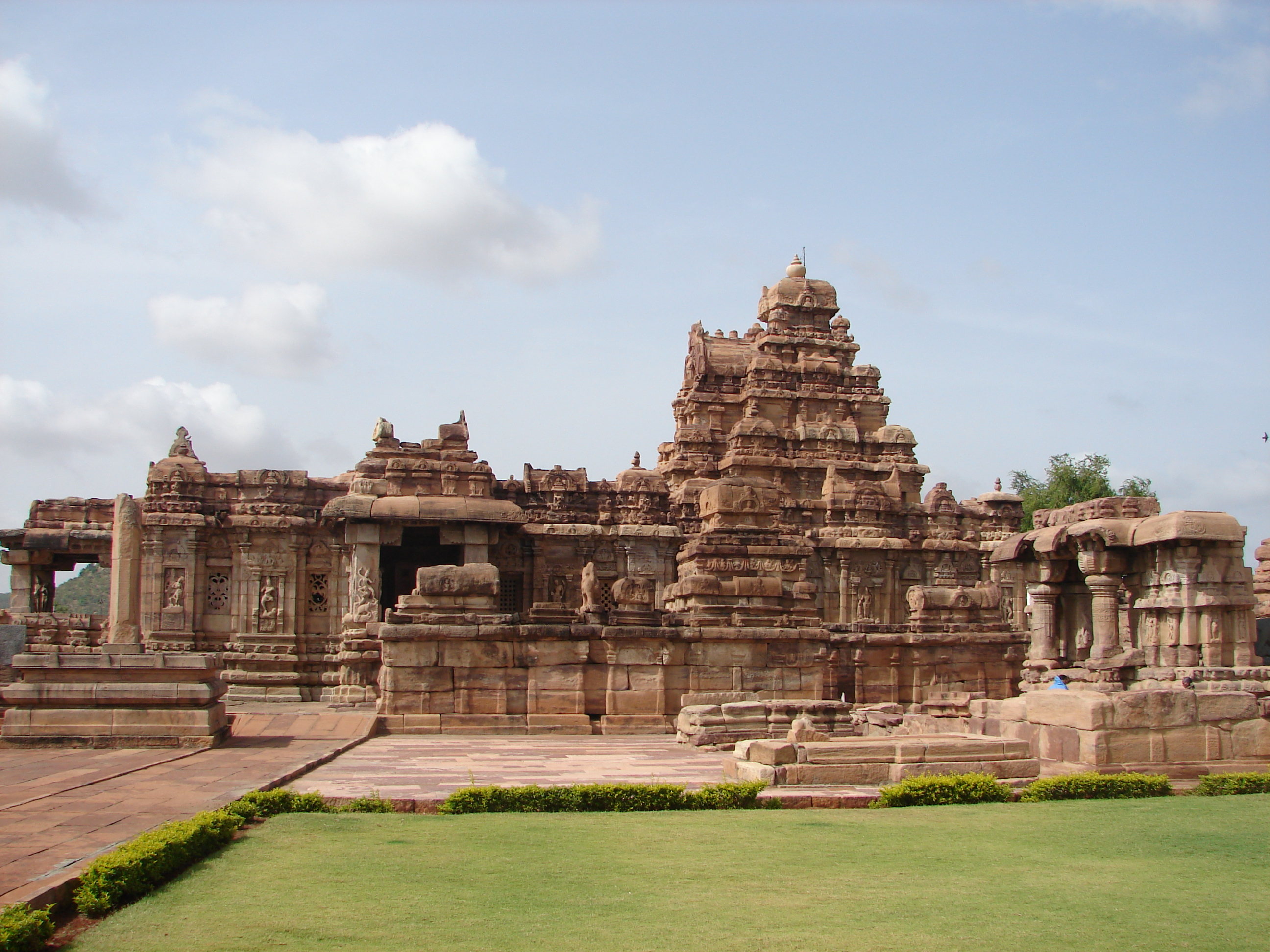
The Virupaksha temple (or Lokesvara temple) at Pattadakal, built by queen Lokamahadevi (queen of Badami Chalukya King Vikramaditya II) around 740 CE, now a World Heritage Site.

Between 500 and 757 CE, Badami Chalukyas built Hindu temples out of sandstone cut into enormous blocks from the outcrops in the chains of the Kaladgi hills.

In Aihole, known as the "Cradle of Indian architecture," there are over 150 temples scattered around the village. The Lad Khan Temple is the oldest. The Durga Temple is notable for its semi-circular apse, elevated plinth and the gallery that encircles the sanctum sanctorum. A sculpture of Vishnu sitting atop a large cobra is at Hutchimali Temple. The Ravalphadi cave temple celebrates the many forms of Shiva. Other temples include the Konthi temple complex and the Meguti Jain temple.

Pattadakal is a World Heritage Site, where one finds the Virupaksha temple; it is the biggest temple, having carved scenes from the great epics of the Ramayana and the Mahabharata. Other temples at Pattadakal are Mallikarjuna, Kashivishwanatha, Galaganatha and Papanath.

===== Bengal temple architecture =====
Several styles of temple architecture developed in Bengal. Notable temple architectural styles of Bengal are the Chala, Ratna and Dalan temples. Chala-style is a hut with a sloping roof, which follows the pattern of huts in most villages of Bengal. Ratna-style originated in Bengal from the 15th to 16th centuries, under the Mallabhum kingdom (also called Malla dynasty). One of the most prominent features of the Chala and Ratna style is the terracotta artwork on the temple walls. The Dalan-style is flat-roofed temples with their heavy cornices on S-curved brackets, and this style was later influenced by European ideas in the 19th century.

The prominent examples of Chala-style are Siddheshwari Kali Temple of Kalna City and Palpara Terracotta Temple of Palpara. One of the prominent example of Ratna-style is Ramchandraji temple at Guptipara. The Sharabhuja Gauranga temple at Panchrol is an example of Dalan-style.

Chala, Ratna and Dalan style Architecture of temples

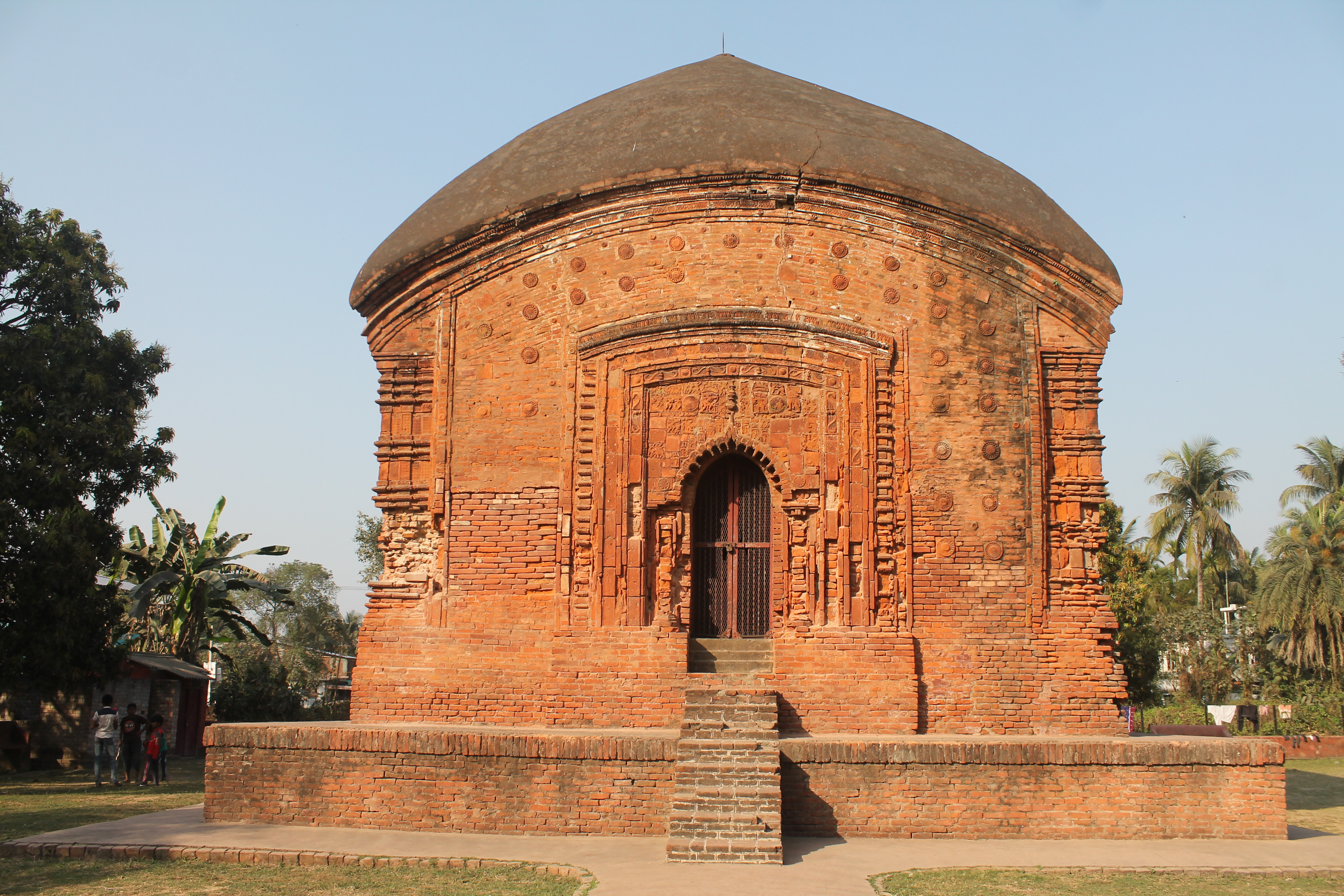
Chala-style (Charchala) temple at Palpara in Nadia district.

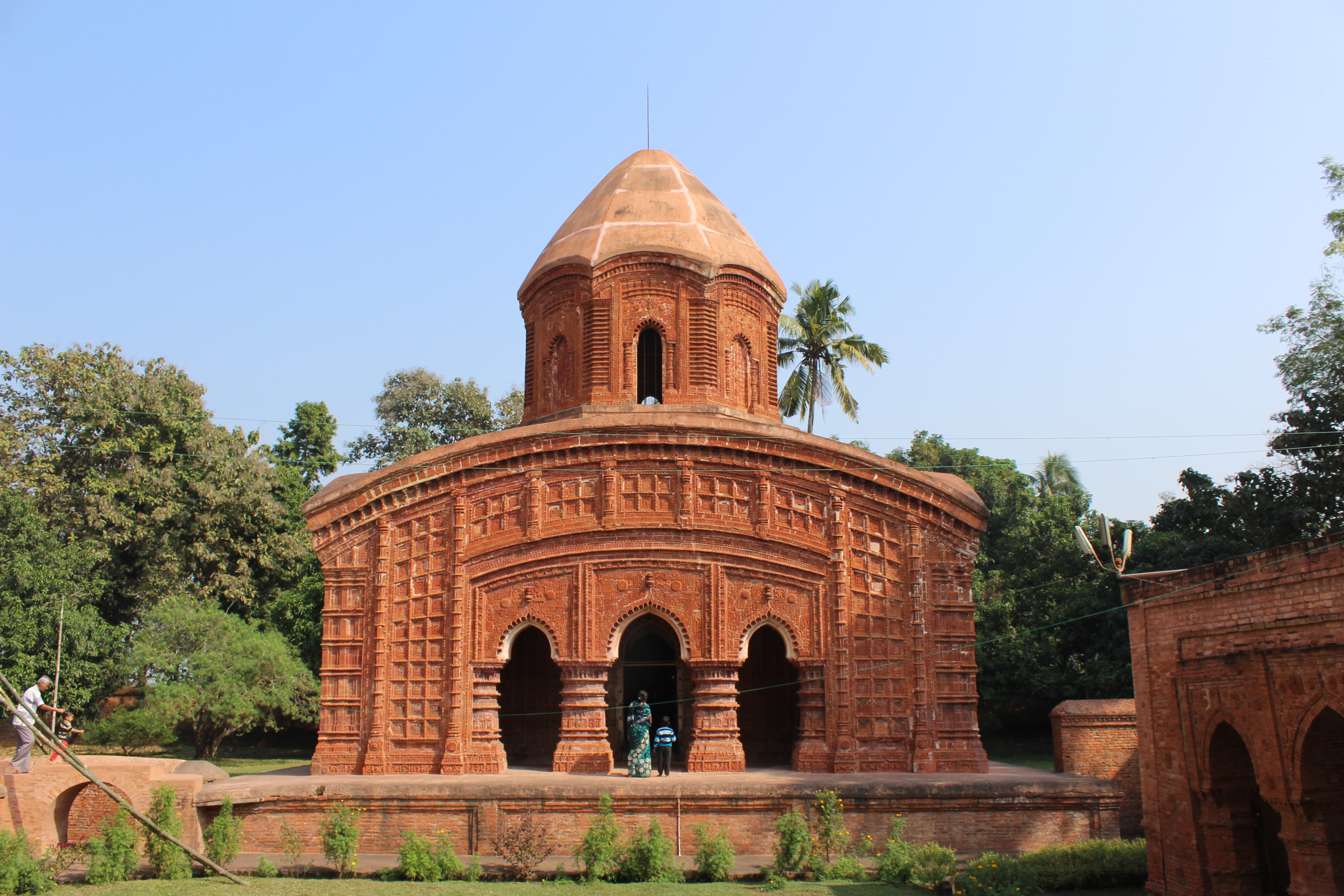
Ek-ratna Ramchandraji temple at Guptipara, Hooghly district

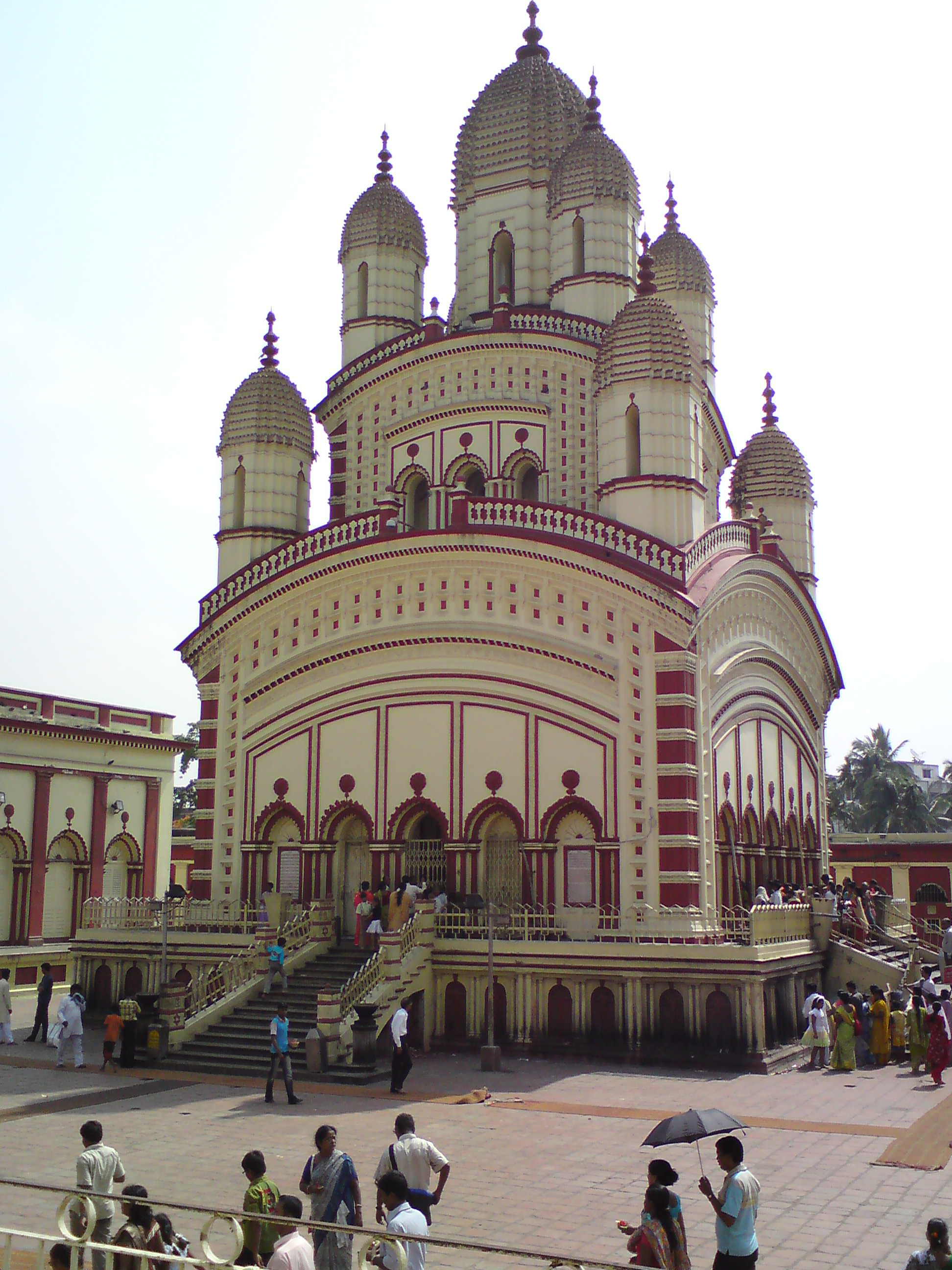
Naba-ratna Dakshineswar Kali Temple near Kolkata, North 24 Parganas district.

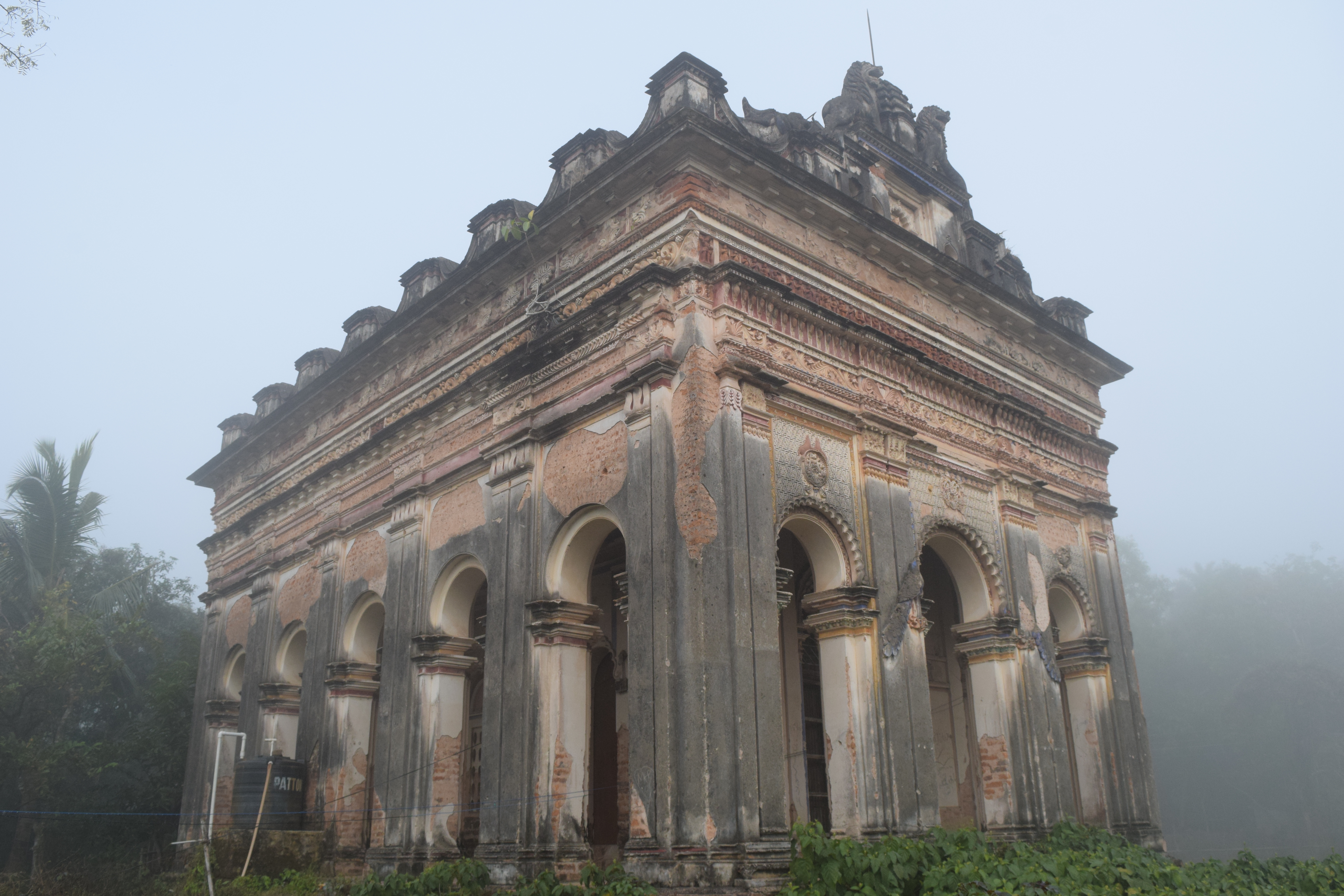
Dalan-style Sharabhuja Gauranga temple at Panchrol, Purba Medinipur district.

===== Gadag architecture =====
The Gadag style of architecture is also called Western Chalukya architecture. The style flourished for 150 years (1050 to 1200 CE); in this period, about 50 temples were built. Some examples are the Saraswati temple in the Trikuteshwara temple complex at Gadag, the Doddabasappa Temple at Dambal, the Kasivisvesvara Temple at Lakkundi, and the Amriteshwara temple at Annigeri. which is marked by ornate pillars with intricate sculpture. This style originated during the period of the Kalyani Chalukyas (also known as Western Chalukya) Someswara I.

Gadag/Western Chalukya style Architecture of temples

Stepped floorplan of Dattatreya Temple (one side of the shrine) with five projections at Chattarki in Gulbarga district, 12th century CE

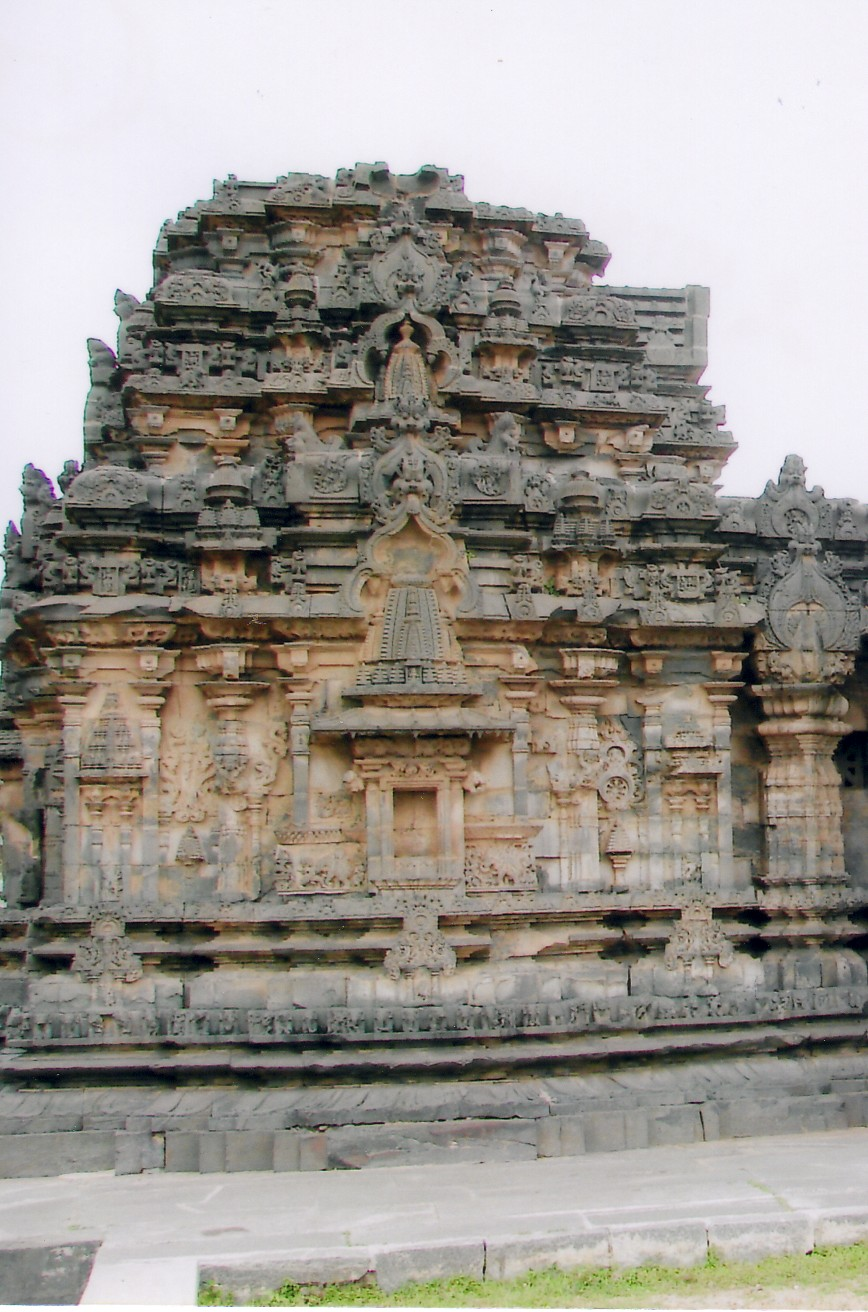
Shrine wall and superstructure in Kasivisvesvara temple at Lakkundi

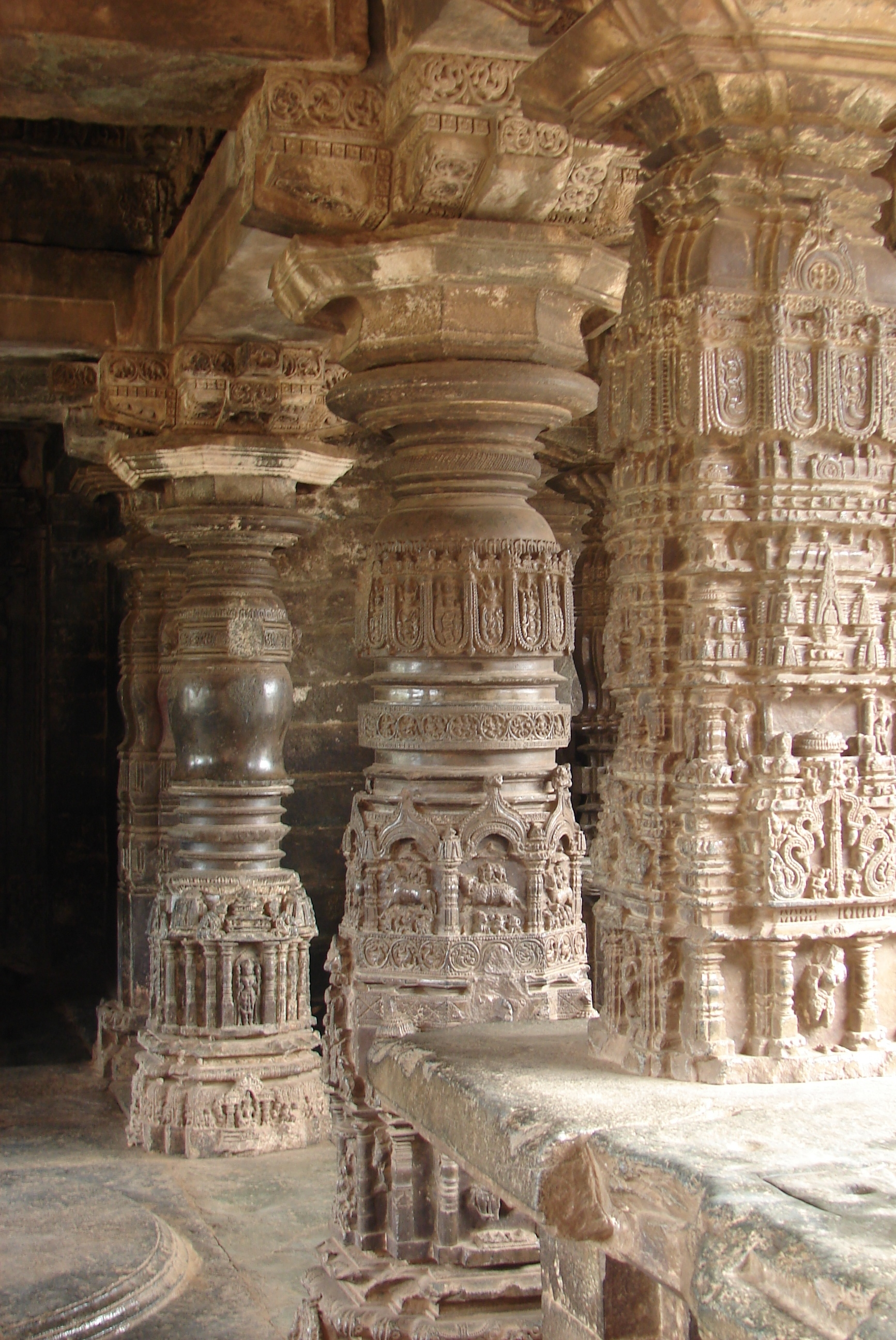
Ornate Gadag style pillars at Sarasvati Temple, Trikuteshwara temple complex at Gadag

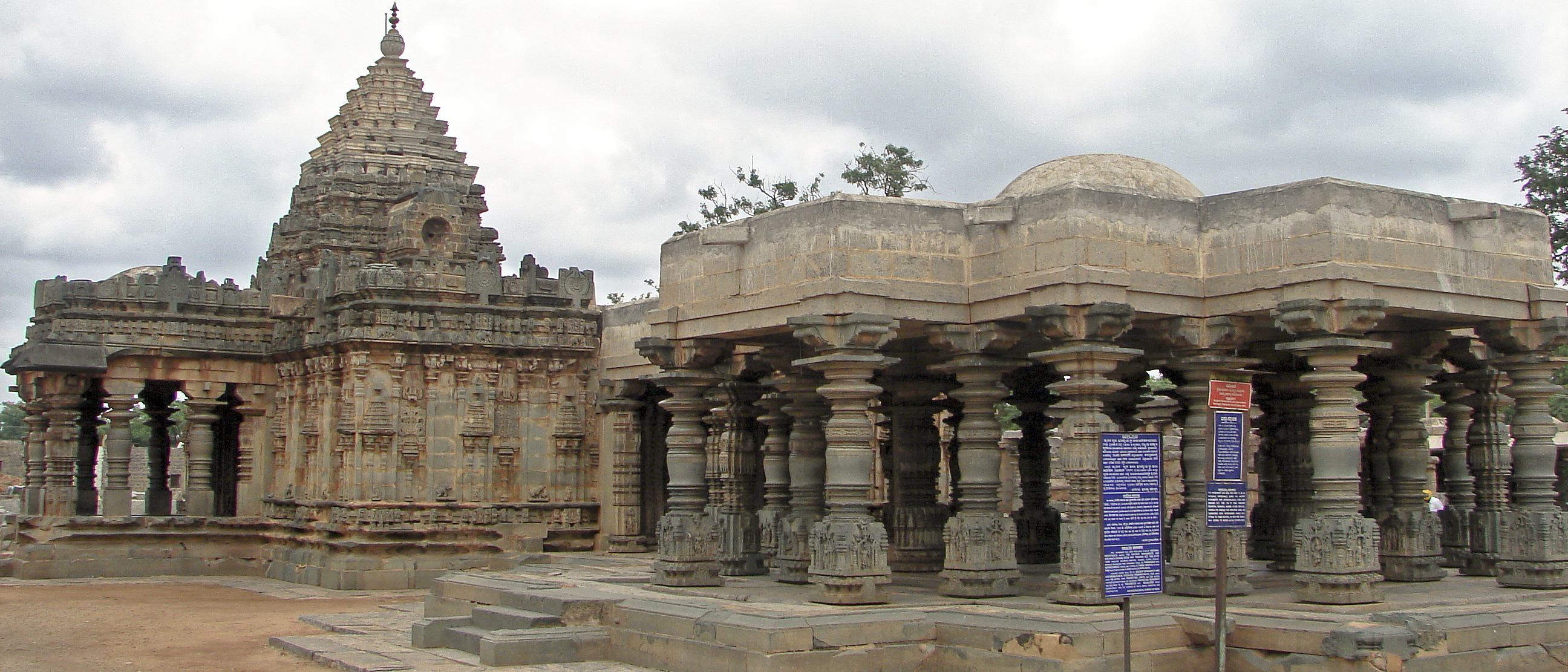
Mahadeva Temple at Itagi, Koppal district in Karnataka, also called Devalaya Chakravarti, 1112 CE, an example of dravida articulation with a nagara superstructure.

===== Kalinga architecture =====
The three types of Deulas

Rekha and Pidha Deula of the Konark Sun Temple

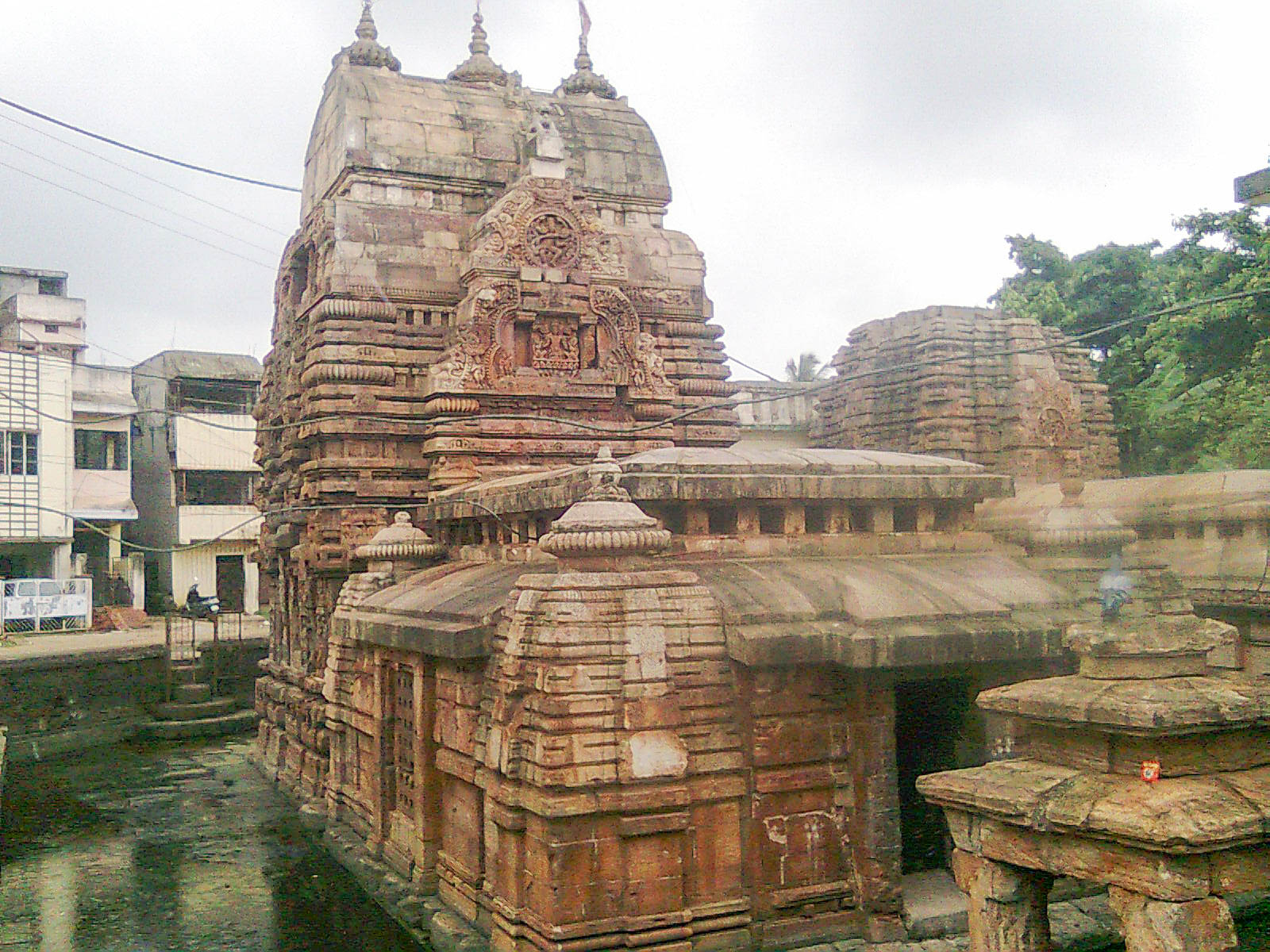
Khakhara Deula of the Vaital Deula

The design which flourished in eastern Indian state of Odisha and Northern Andhra Pradesh are called Kalinga style of architecture. The style consists of three distinct type of temples namely Rekha Deula, Pidha Deula and Khakhara Deula. Deula means "temple" in the Odia language. The former two are associated with Vishnu, Surya and Shiva temple while the third is mainly with Chamunda and Durga temples. The Rekha deula and Khakhara deula houses the sanctum sanctorum while the Pidha Deula constitutes outer dancing and offering halls.

The prominent examples of Rekha Deula are Lingaraja Temple of Bhubaneswar and Jagannath Temple of Puri. One of the prominent example of Khakhara Deula is Vaital Deula. The Mukhasala structure that remains of the Konark Sun Temple is an example of Pidha Deula.

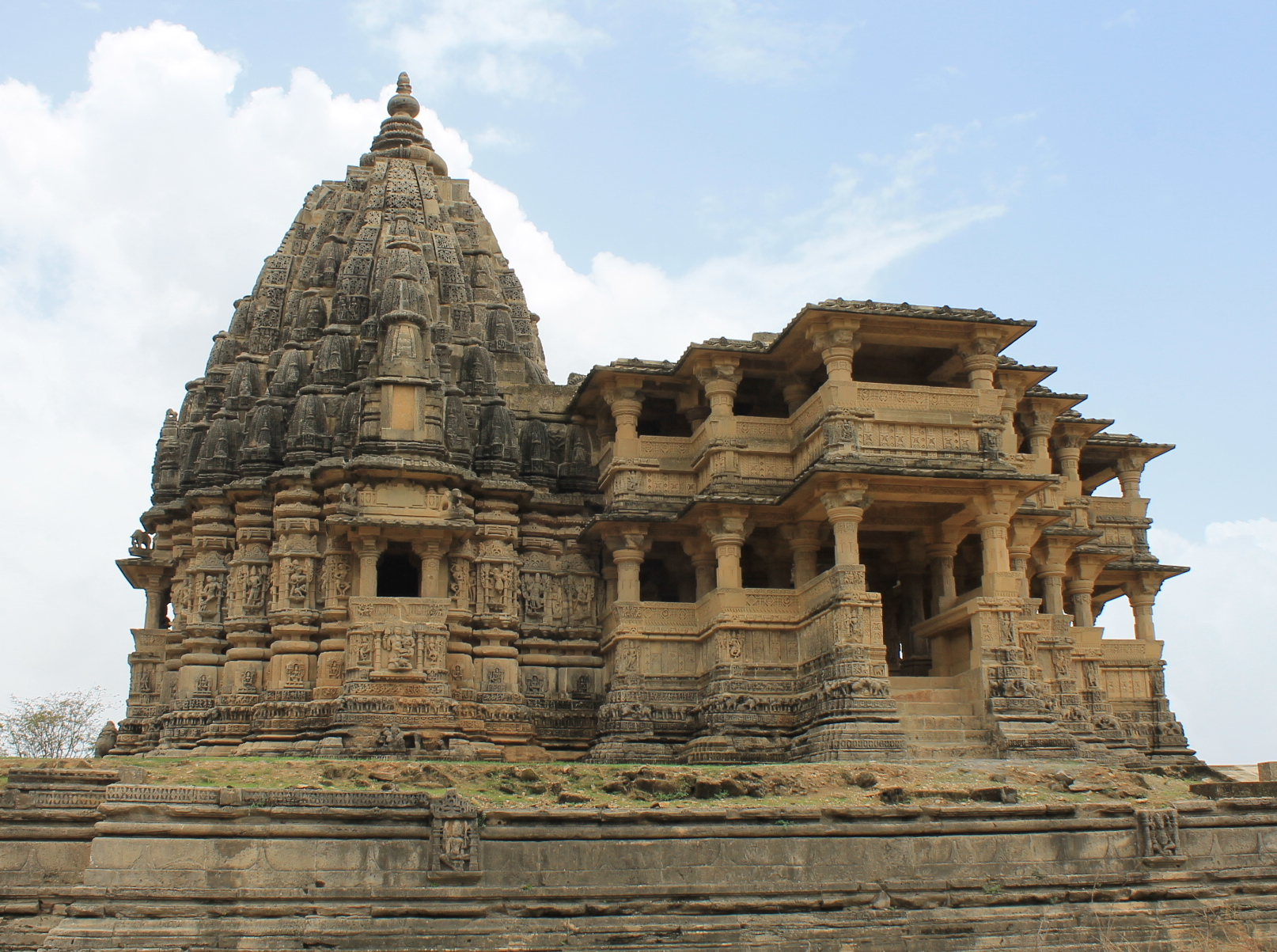
Navlakha Temple, Ghumli, Gujarat, 12th century

===== Māru-Gurjara architecture =====
Māru-Gurjara architecture, or Solaṅkī style, is a style of north Indian temple architecture that originated in Gujarat and Rajasthan from the 11th to 13th centuries, under the Chaulukya dynasty (or Solaṅkī dynasty). Although originating as a regional style in Hindu temple architecture, it became especially popular in Jain temples and, mainly under Jain patronage, later spread across India and to diaspora communities around the world.

On the exteriors, the style is distinguished from other north Indian temple styles of the period in "that the external walls of the temples have been structured by increasing numbers of projections and recesses, accommodating sharply carved statues in niches. These are normally positioned in superimposed registers, above the lower bands of moldings. The latter display continuous lines of horse riders, elephants, and kīrttimukhas. Hardly any segment of the surface is left unadorned." The main shikhara tower usually has many urushringa subsidiary spirelets on it, and two smaller side-entrances with porches are common in larger temples.

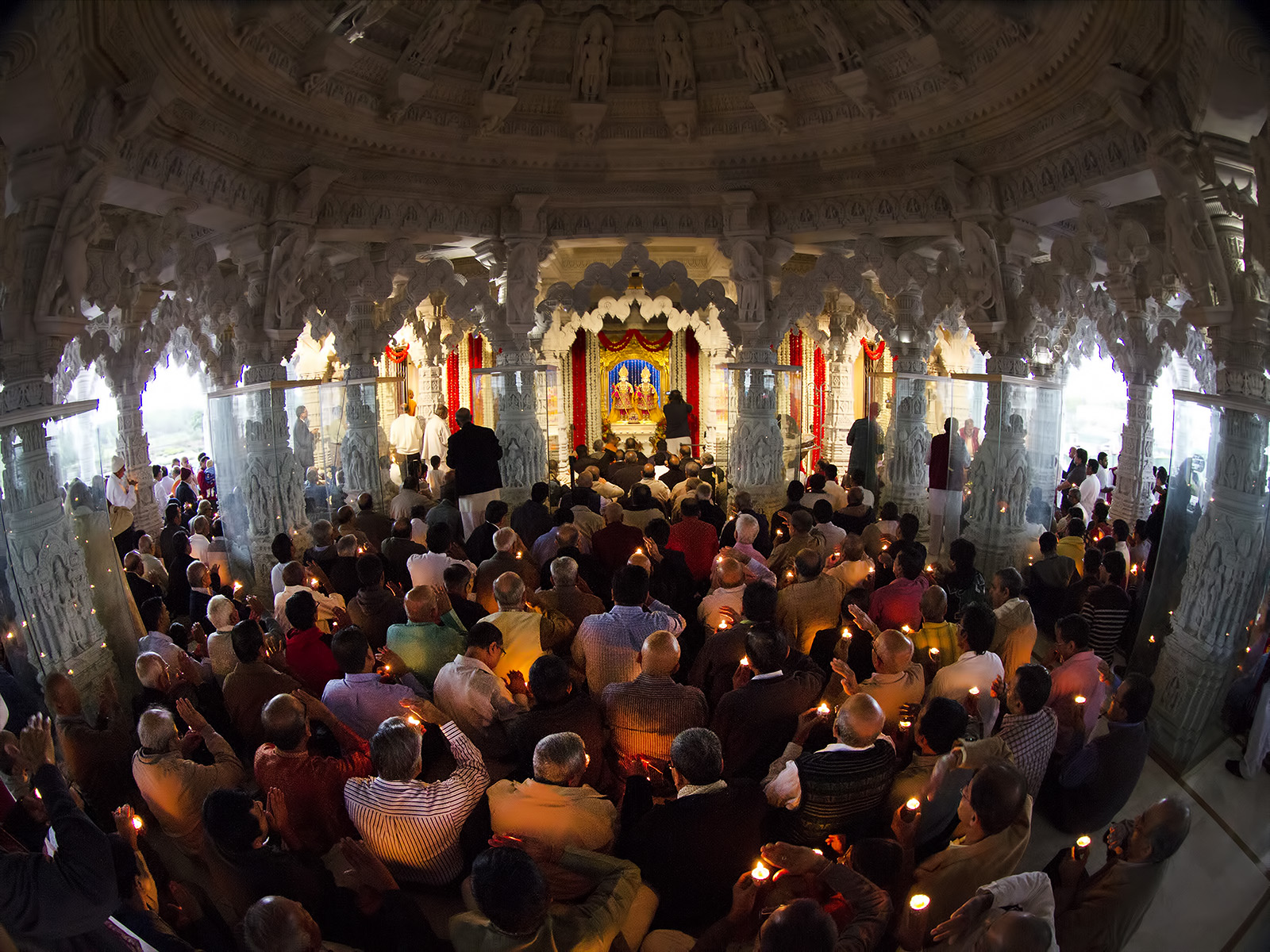
Devotions in the Swaminarayan temple in Houston, Texas (2004)

Interiors are if anything even more lavishly decorated, with elaborate carving on most surfaces. In particular, Jain temples often have small low domes carved on the inside with a highly intricate rosette design. Another distinctive feature is "flying" arch-like elements between pillars, touching the horizontal beam above in the centre, and elaborately carved. These have no structural function, and are purely decorative. The style developed large pillared halls, many open at the sides, with Jain temples often having one closed and two pillared halls in sequence on the main axis leading to the shrine.

The style mostly fell from use in Hindu temples in its original regions by the 13th century, especially as the area had fallen to the Muslim Delhi Sultanate by 1298. But, unusually for an Indian temple style, it continued to be used by Jains there and elsewhere, with a notable "revival" in the 15th century. Since then it has continued in use in Jain and some Hindu temples, and from the late 20th century has spread to temples built outside India by both the Jain diaspora and Hindus. Some buildings mix Māru-Gurjara elements with those of local temple styles and modern international ones. Generally, where there is elaborate carving, often still done by craftsmen from Gujarat or Rajasthan, this has more ornamental and decorative work than small figures. In particular the style is used in India and abroad by the Swaminarayan sect. Sometimes the Māru-Gurjara influence is limited to the "flying arches" and mandapa ceiling rosettes, and a preference for white marble.

=== Nepal ===
==== Newar architecture ====
This style is one of the oldest styles of temples on the Asian continent and derives its shape from Himalayan fir trees. The ground floor is typically the residence of the deity, either Hindu or Buddhist, while the upper floors are used as storage for religious items. There is gajura at the top which is the combination of a lotus base, an upside-down vase, a triangle and a kalasha. The pagoda style flourished in Nepal from the beginning of the 13th century. The temples of Pashupatinath, Changunarayan, Chandeshwori and Banepa are excellent examples of ancient architecture in the pagoda style. The Malla period produced various pagoda-style temples and palaces such as Nayatapola, Dattatraya of Bhaktapur, Kasthamandap of Kathmandu, Taleju Temple, Vajrabarahi, Vajrayogini.

=== Southeast Asia as part of Greater India ===
Architecture of the southeast nations was inspired by the Indian temple architecture, as those were Indianised as part of the Greater India.

==== Champa architecture ====
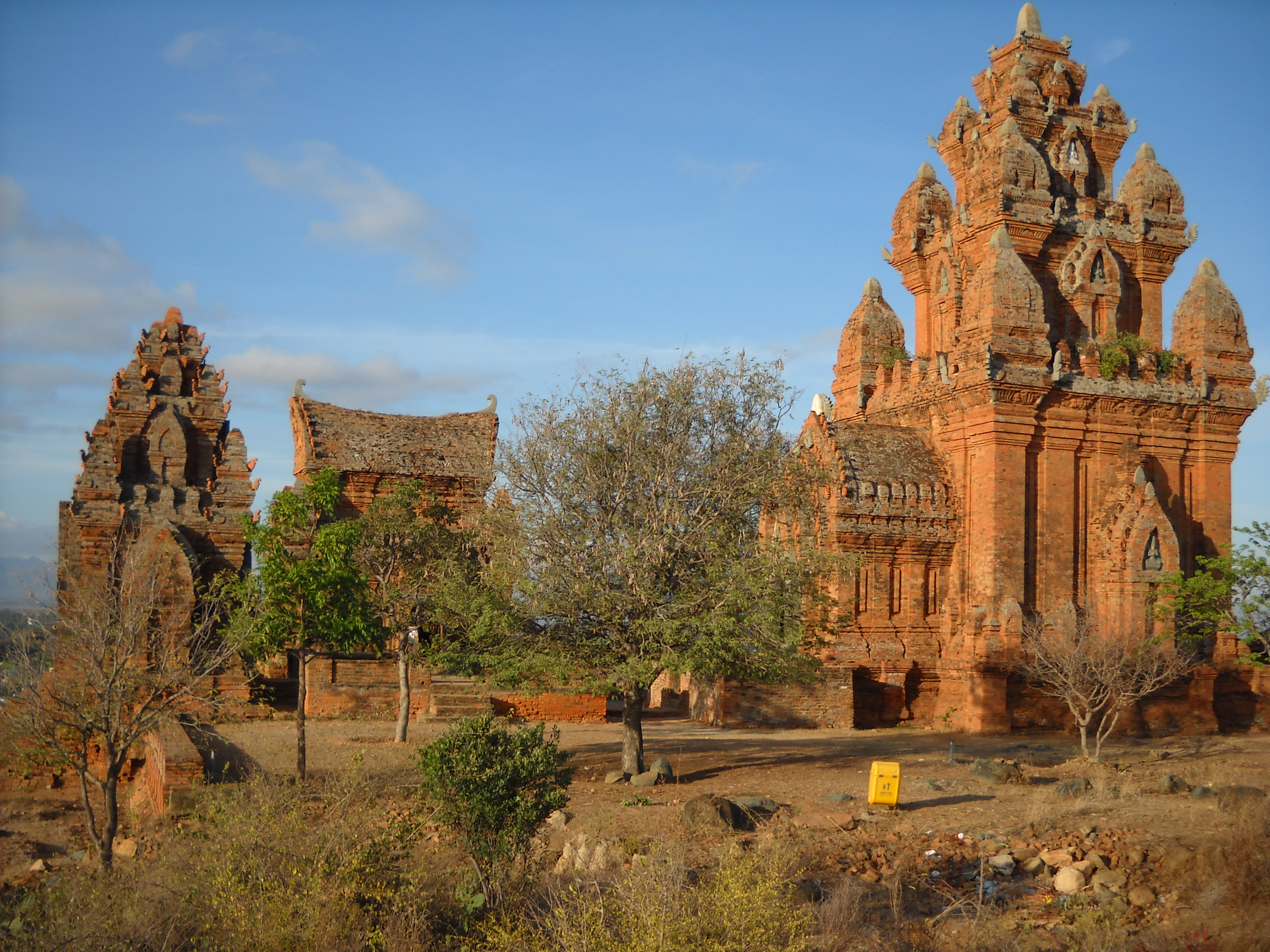
The profile of the 13th-century Po Klong Garai Temple near Phan Rang includes all the buildings typical of a Cham temple. From left to right one can see the gopura, the saddle-shaped kosagrha, and mandapa attached to the kalan tower.

Between the 6th and the 16th century, the Kingdom of Champa flourished in present-day central and southern Vietnam. Unlike the Javanese that mostly used volcanic andesite stone for their temples, and Khmer of Angkor which mostly employed grey sandstones to construct their religious buildings, the Cham built their temples from reddish bricks. The most important remaining sites of Cham bricks temple architecture include Mỹ Sơn near Da Nang, Po Nagar near Nha Trang, and Po Klong Garai near Phan Rang.

Typically, a Cham temple complex consisted of several different kinds of buildings. They are kalan, a brick sanctuary, typically in the form of a tower with garbahgriha used to host the murti of deity. A mandapa is an entry hallway connected with a sanctuary. A kosagrha or "fire-house" is a temple construction typically with a saddle-shaped roof, used to house the valuables belonging to the deity or to cook for the deity. The gopura was a gate-tower leading into a walled temple complex. These building types are typical for Hindu temples in general; the classification is valid not only for the architecture of Champa, but also for other architectural traditions of Greater India.

==== Indonesian architecture ====
Prambanan, an example of Indonesian temple architecture
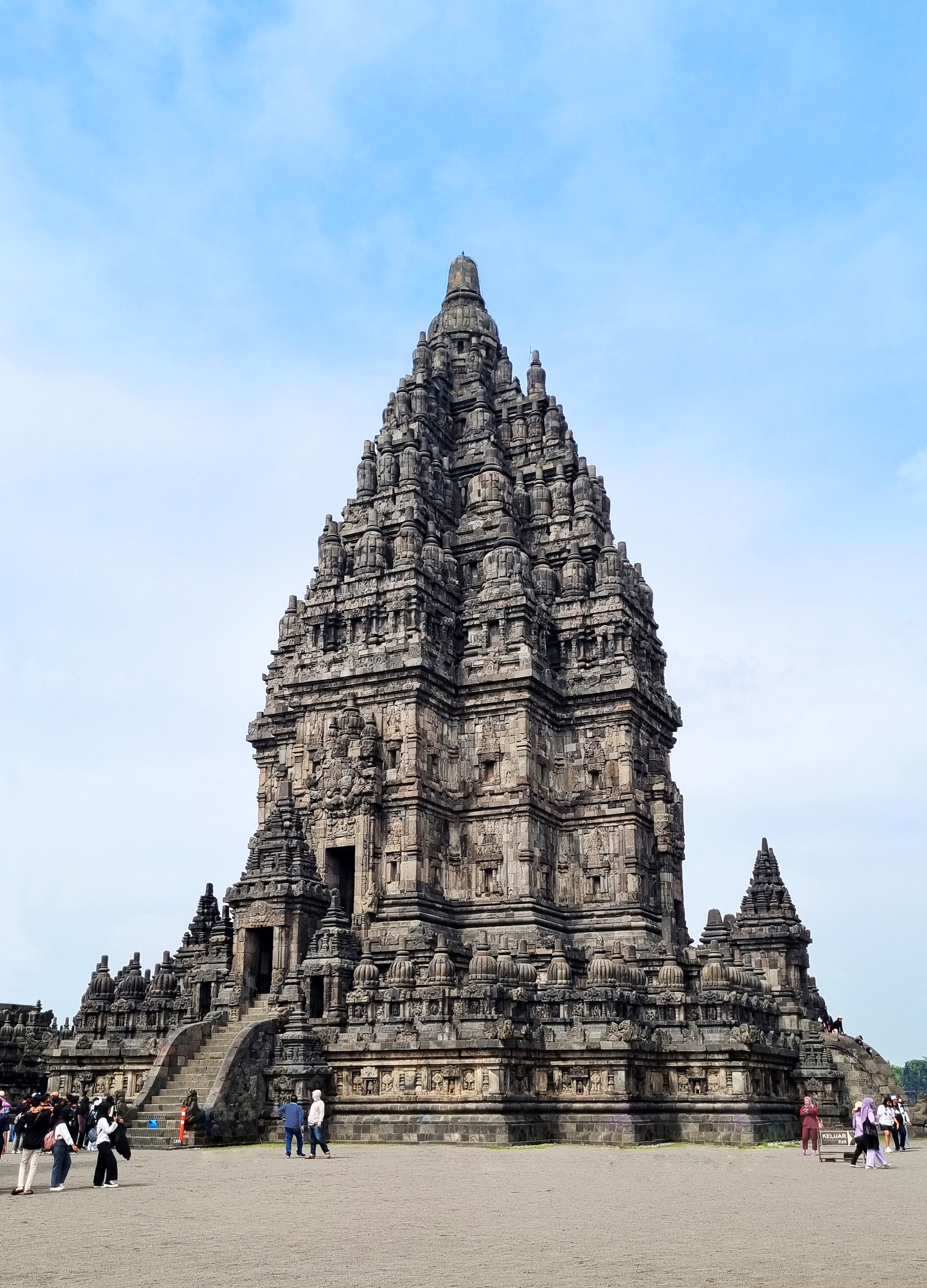
Prambanan temple (Shivagrha) of Central Java, an example of the 9th century Indonesian Javanese Hindu temple architecture with mandala layout and prasad tower crowned with stylised ratna-vajra.

Temples are called candi (pronounced [ˈtʃandi]) in Indonesia, whether it is Buddhist or Hindu. A candi refers to a structure based on the Indian type of single-celled shrine, with a pyramidal tower above it (Meru tower in Bali), and a portico for entrance, mostly built between the 7th to 15th centuries. In Hindu Balinese architecture, a candi shrine can be found within a pura compound. The best example of Indonesian Javanese Hindu temple architecture is the 9th century Prambanan (Shivagrha) temple compound, located in Central Java, near Yogyakarta. This largest Hindu temple in Indonesia has three main prasad towers, dedicated to Trimurti gods. Shiva temple, the largest main temple is towering to 47 metre-high (154 ft).

The term "candi" itself is believed was derived from Candika, one of the manifestations of the goddess Durga as the goddess of death.

The candi architecture follows the typical Hindu architecture traditions based on Vastu Shastra. The temple layout, especially in central Java period, incorporated mandala temple plan arrangements and also the typical high towering spires of Hindu temples. The candi was designed to mimic Meru, the holy mountain the abode of gods. The whole temple is a model of Hindu universe according to Hindu cosmology and the layers of Loka.

The candi structure and layout recognise the hierarchy of the zones, spanned from the less holy to the holiest realms. The Indic tradition of Hindu-Buddhist architecture recognise the concept of arranging elements in three parts or three elements. Subsequently, the design, plan and layout of the temple follows the rule of space allocation within three elements; commonly identified as foot (base), body (centre), and head (roof). They are Bhurloka represented by the outer courtyard and the foot (base) part of each temples, Bhuvarloka represented by the middle courtyard and the body of each temples, and Svarloka which symbolised by the roof of Hindu structure usually crowned with ratna (sanskrit: jewel) or vajra.

==== Khmer architecture ====
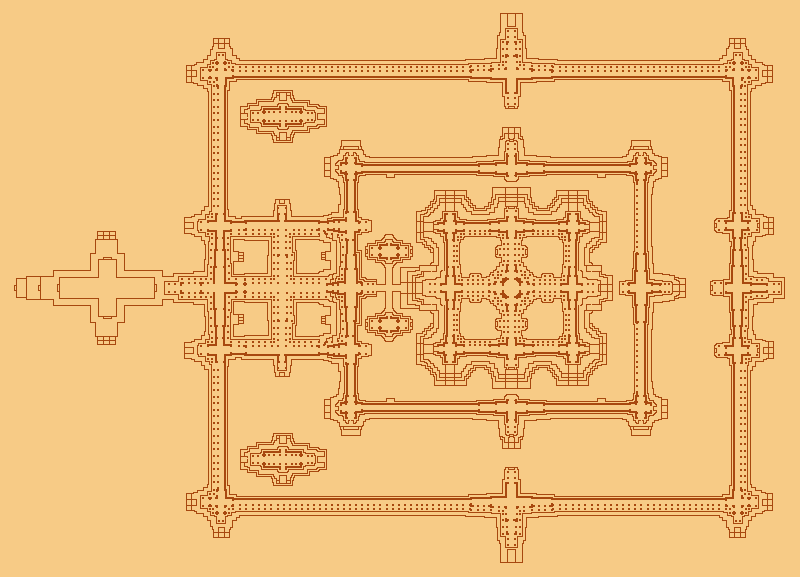
A diagram map of Angkor Wat reveal the concentric square galleries. On the right is an aerial view of the central structure of Angkor Wat, in front of it lies the cruciform terrace.

Before the 14th century, the Khmer Empire flourished in present-day Cambodia with its influence extended to most of mainland Southeast Asia. Its great capital, Angkor (Khmer: អង្គរ, "Capital City", derived from Sanskrit "nagara"), contains some of the most important and the most magnificent example of Khmer temple architecture. The classic style of Angkorian temple is demonstrated by the 12th century Angkor Wat. Angkorian builders mainly used sandstone and laterite as temple building materials.

The main superstructure of typical Khmer temple is a towering prasat called prang which houses the garbhagriha inner chamber, where the murti of Vishnu or Shiva, or a lingam resides. Khmer temples were typically enclosed by a concentric series of walls, with the central sanctuary in the middle; this arrangement represented the mountain ranges surrounding Mount Meru, the mythical home of the gods. Enclosures are the spaces between these walls, and between the innermost wall and the temple itself. The walls defining the enclosures of Khmer temples are frequently lined by galleries, while passage through the walls is by way of gopuras located at the cardinal points. The main entrance usually adorned with elevated causeway with cruciform terrace.

== Glossary ==
The Hindu texts on temple architecture have an extensive terminology. Most terms have several different names in the various Indian languages used in different regions of India, as well as the Sanscrit names used in ancient texts. A few of the more common terms are tabulated below, mostly in their Sanscrit/Hindi forms:

Term	Explanation	Synonyms or Similar	Illustrative Hindu text mention / design rules	Reference	Image
Adhisthana	stylobate, plinth, base typically with mouldings on the side, on which a temple building or pillar stands	Athavaksham, Pista, Pitha	Manasara XIV, Kamikagama 35, Suprabhedagama 31		
Amalaka	a crowning ornament on the top of shikara, shape of an Indian amalok fruit that looks like a cogged wheel. The amalaka supports the kalasha.		Mayamata śilpaśāstra		
Antarala	lit. interior space of any building; in temples, it is the intermediate space (vestibule, antechamber) between the sanctum and space where pilgrims gather	Sukhanasi	Manasara XV, XXIII; Kamikagama XXXV		
Ardhamandapa	half hall at each entrance, usually the reception area that connects to the mandapa		Manasara XIV, Kamikagama 35, Suprabhedagama 31		
Ayatana	assembly hall, grounds inside a temple or monastery compound		Agni Purana XLIII, Matsya Purana CCLXX, Chandogya Upanishad 6.8.2		
Bhadra	a projection often aligned to one of the cardinal directions; typically of central part of walls; decoration or a projected porch for pilgrims; also may be a tower storey projection		Manasara XXX-XXXIV		
Dvarapala	a gate guardian often portrayed as a warrior or fearsome giant				
Gana	a mythical dwarf or goblin usually with a protruded belly and with humorous expression				
Garbhagriha	The womb-house, adytum, sanctum sanctorum; it is the loci of the temple and the darshana, the spiritual space that Hindus circumambulate clockwise about. This is where the main murti image is placed. Usually the space is very plain, with no distractions from the murti, which is rich in symbolism. A large temple may have many shrines, each with a garbhagriya.	Garbha-griya, Garbha-geha, Sibika, Garbha, Mula-sthana	Brihat Samhita LXI		
Gavaksha	one of the arch motifs; it is horseshoe-shaped, found with windows or for decorating spires, pillars and other elements	Gavaksa, kudu			
Gopuram	a gateway at entrance or one that connects two sacred spaces of the temple; becomes very large in South Indian temples, which may have several; it has roots in ancient Indian monasteries and the Vedic word gomatipur;	Gopura, Dvara attalaka	Agni Purana XLII, Manasara XI, XXXIII verses 1–601, LVIII		
Hara	neck ornament such as necklace				
Jala	a trellis, stone grille, net, first seen in 6th-century temples	Jali, Indra koshtha			
Jagati	any moulded base or pedestal for the temple or a statue that extends out, part of platform that forms a terrace to stand on or circumambulate around on, while reading the reliefs and friezes	Jagata, Pithika, Jagati-pitha, Kati, Vasudha	Samarangana-sutradhara LXVIII, Agni Purana XLII, Suprabhedagama 31.19		
Kalasha	the pinnacle element of a temple, a vase finial, cupola or pitcher	Kalasam, Stupi, Kumuda	Agni Purana CIV, Kamikagama 55		
Kunda	temple tank, stepwell, pool, usually with steps, public utility for taking a dip; often connected to a nearby river or mountain stream	Pushkarani, Sara, Sagar, Tadaga, Udapana, Var, Vapi	Garuda Purana XLVI, Mahanirvana tantra XIII		
Lata	liana, creeper-style plant, vine, one type of scroll work; also found on shikhara				
Makara	a mythical fusion sea creature with fish-crocodile like face, trunk or snout, legs sometimes with lion claws and a tail; vahana of Varuna		Suprabhedagama 31.68-72		
Mandapa	pillared hall or pavilion, with pillars usually carved; a mandapa is typically square, rectangle, octagonal or circular; it may have walls with perforated stone windows, it may just be open on some or all sides. Large temples may have many interconnected mandapas. It is a gathering place, a place for pilgrims to rest (choultry), a part of the circumambulation space, or to wait during prayers or Sanskara (rite of passage) rituals. A mandapa may have a tower (shikhara) of its own, but it is lower than that above the sanctum.	Mandapam, Mantapa, Jagamohan	Manasara XXXII-XXXIV, Kamikagama 50, Brihat samhita, Vishnu Purana 6.124-136		
Mulaprasada	main shrine in a temple complex				
Nisha	niche on temple walls or in pillars for sculptures or stele				
Nyasa	the art of arranging images and friezes to create a narrative or composition, in some texts it refers to relative placement of images within a panel to summarise a Hindu legend or fable; also a form a ritual.		Vastusutra Upanishad VI		
Prakara	wall that separates an inner zone of temple ground from an outer zone; typically concentric, defensive and fortified, a feature added after the wars and plunders starting in the 14th-century				
Prastara	entablature, horizontal superstructure of bands and mouldings above column capitals, sometimes functions as a parapet of a storey	Chaiva, gopanam, kapotam, mancham	Manasara XVI; Kamikagama LIV		
Ratha	a facet or vertical offset projection on the plan of the sanctum and shikhara above, or other structure. It is generally carried up from the bottom of the temple to the superstructure. A ratha, meaning cart, is also the temple chariot used for processing the murti at festivals, and a "ratha temple" is one designed to resemble a cart, with wheels on the sides, and often horses. The most famous example is the Sun Temple, Konarak.				
Sala	Round barrel-roofed, wagon-roofed pavilion; rooted in the thatched roofed stall for people or cattle tradition, then other materials of construction; any mansion or griha; a pilgrim services building with mandapas or pillared veranda or both inside the temple complex, Hindu texts describe multi-storey Sala; in south, sala are structures used as a decorative motif, or an actual roof, as at the top of gopurams; rooted in ancient thatched roof styles.	Chala	Manasara XXXV verses 1–404		
Shikhara/Vimana	In North India, the tower above the sanctum (entire spire above mulaprasada); in South India, that top part of tower that is above the vimana	Shikha, Shikhanta, Shikhamani, Deul in East India, Garbhaka, Garbhamandira	Brihat Samhita LVI		
Stambha	A pillar; it can be a load bearing element or an independent standing element with diya (lamps) and Hindu icons below, around and / or on top; the designs vary significantly by region, in Kerala Hindu temples they are at the entrance; on festive occasions the wick lamps are loaded with oil and lit up.	Kambha, Dhvajastambha, Kodimaram	Manasara XV, Kaśyapa śilpa śāstra IX		
Sukanasa	an external ornamented feature over the entrance to the garbhagriha or inner shrine. It sits on the face of the shikhara tower (in South India, the vimana) as a sort of antefix. Can refer to the antarala below as well.	sukanasa-sika	Agni Purana XLII		
Tala	tier or storey of a shikhara, vimana or gopuram				
Torana	any arch or canopy motif, ornament or architectural member in temples and buildings; it also refers to an arched gateway	Numerous terms, e.g. Gavaksha (from 'cow eye'-shaped)	Garuda Purana XLVII, Manasara XLVI verses 1-77		
Urushringa	subsidiary turret-like shikharas on the side of the main shikhara; the primary turret is called shringa		Brihat Samhita LVI, Agni Purana CIV		

== Gallery ==
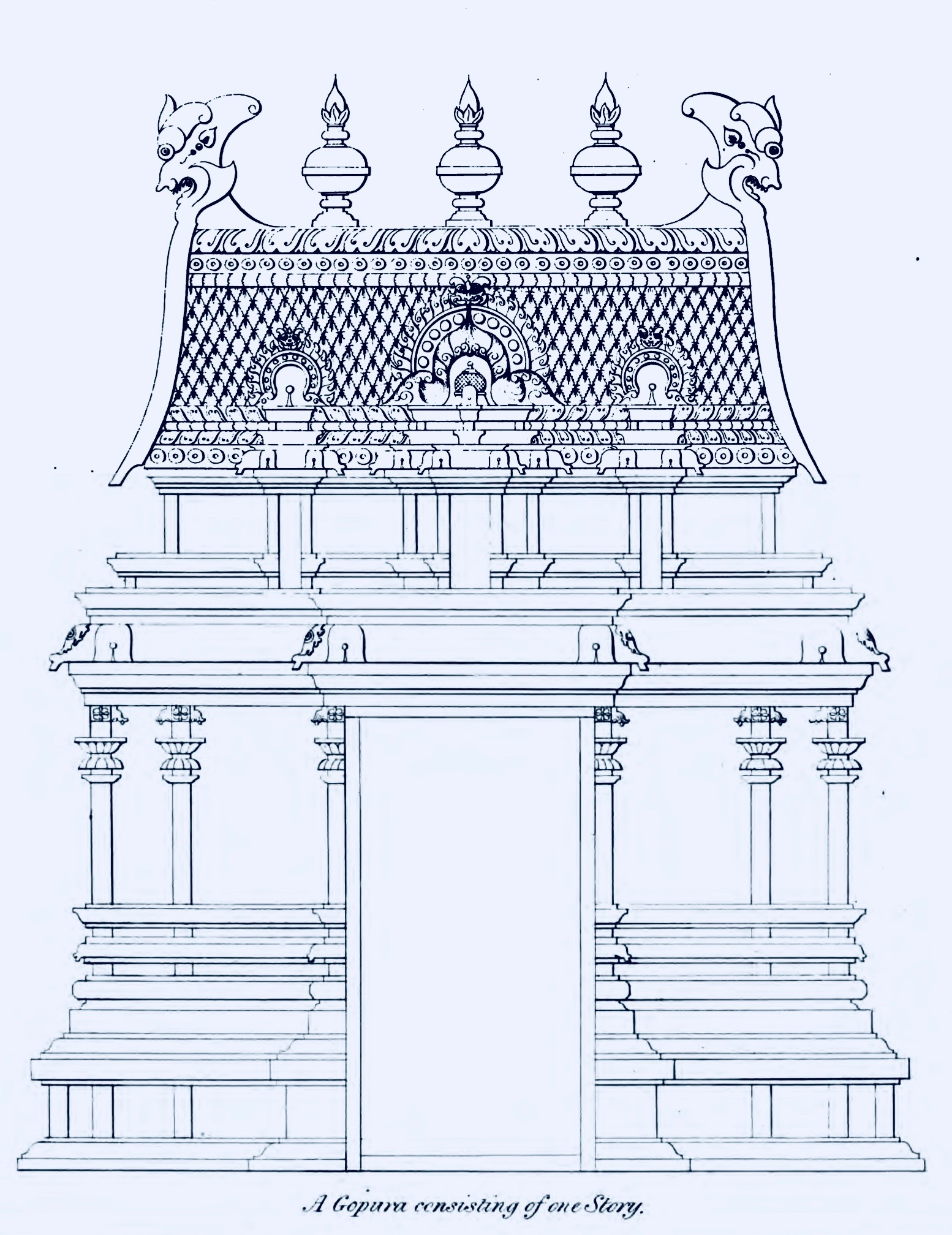
Single storey gopura (Dravidian architecture)

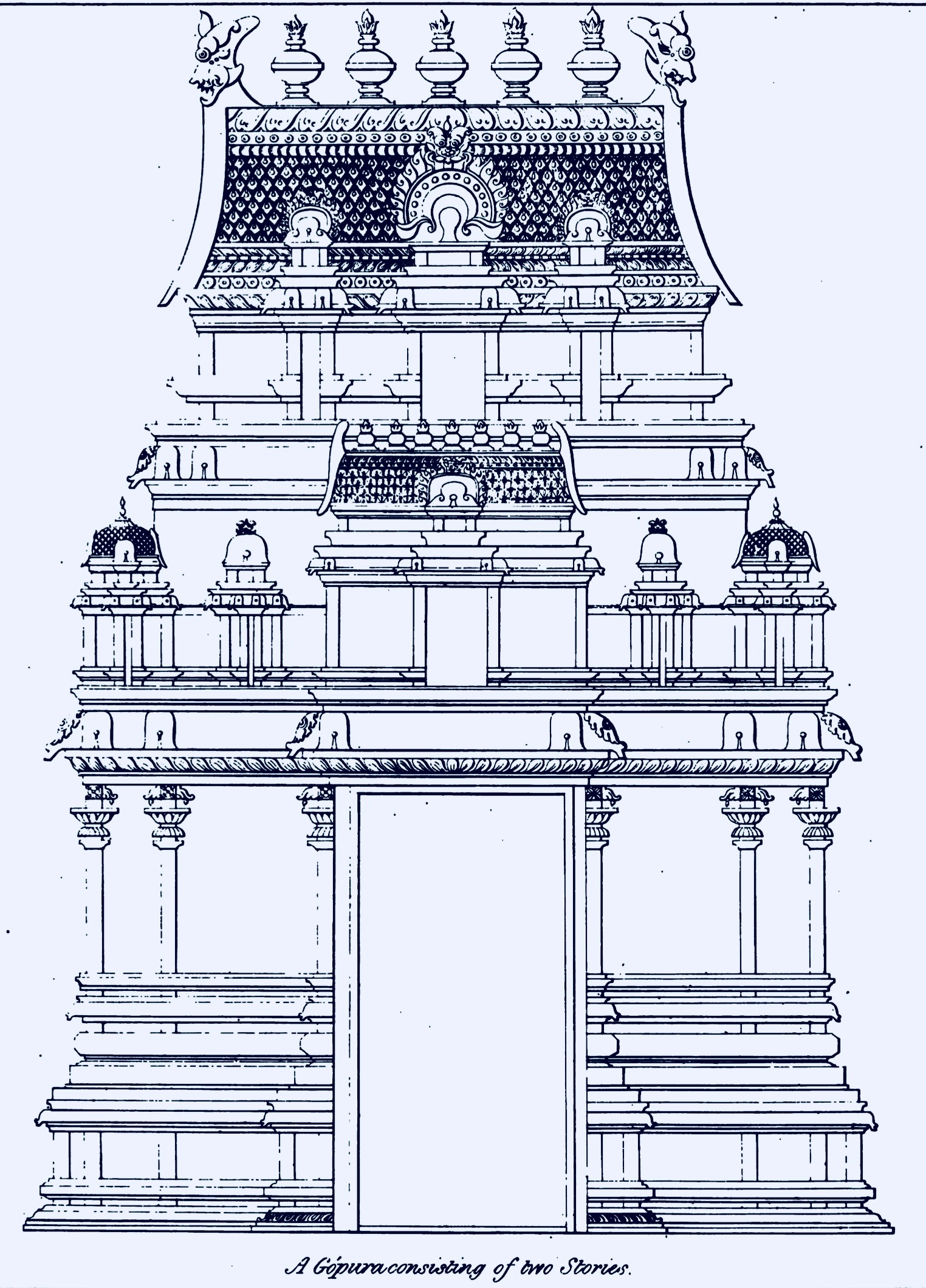
Two storey gopura (Dravidian architecture)

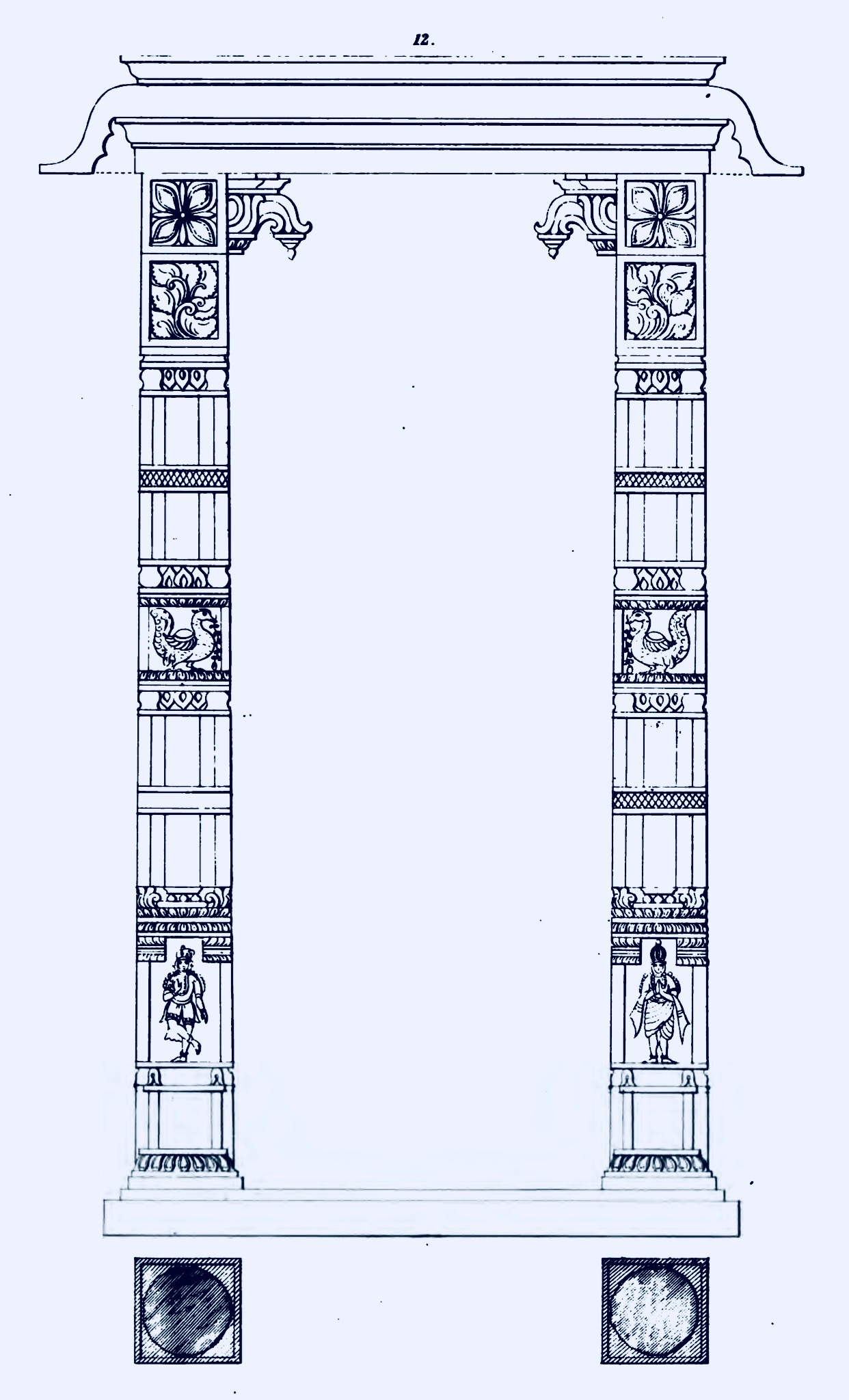
Pillar elements (shared by Nagara and Dravidian)

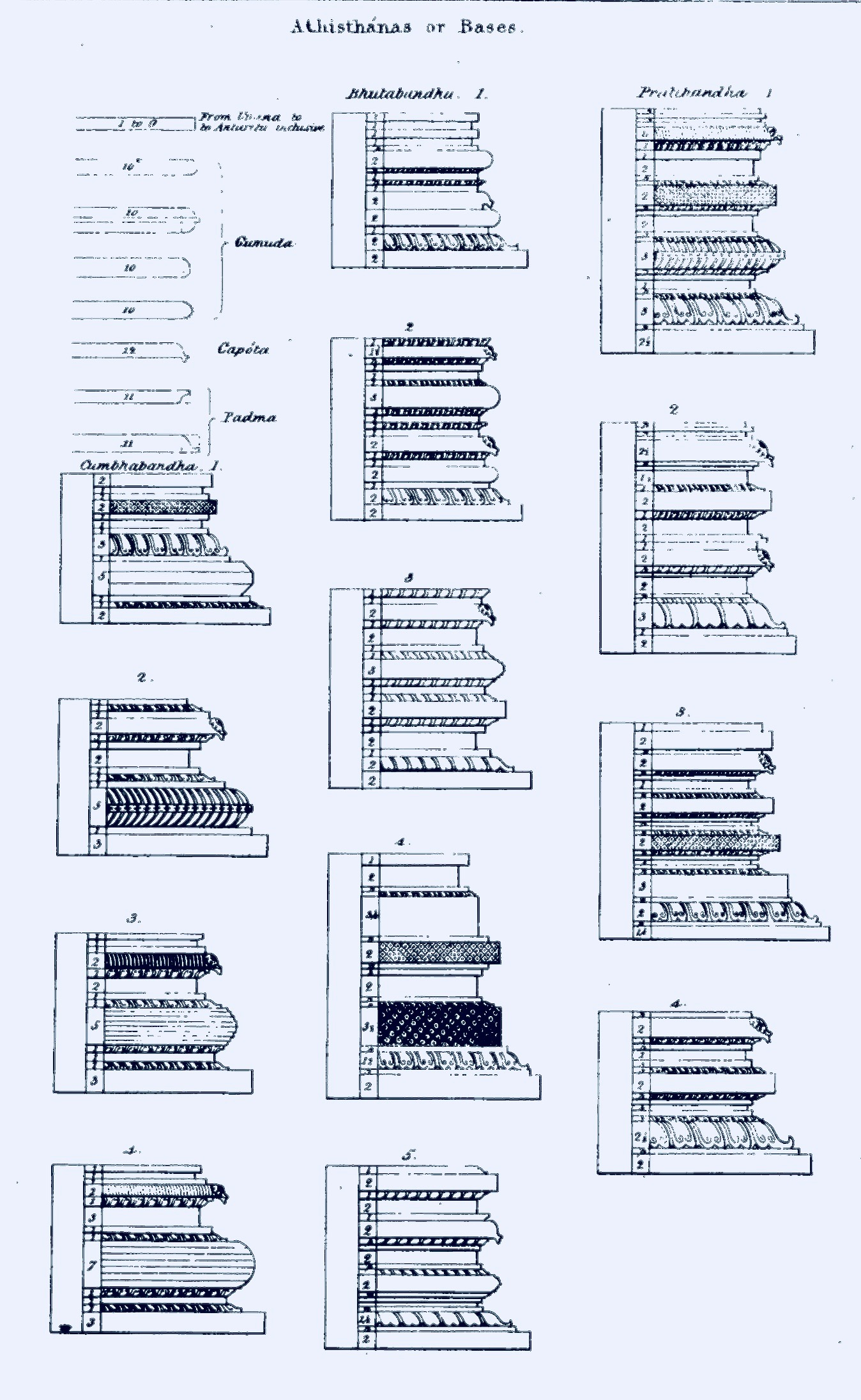
Athisthana architectural elements of a Hindu temple

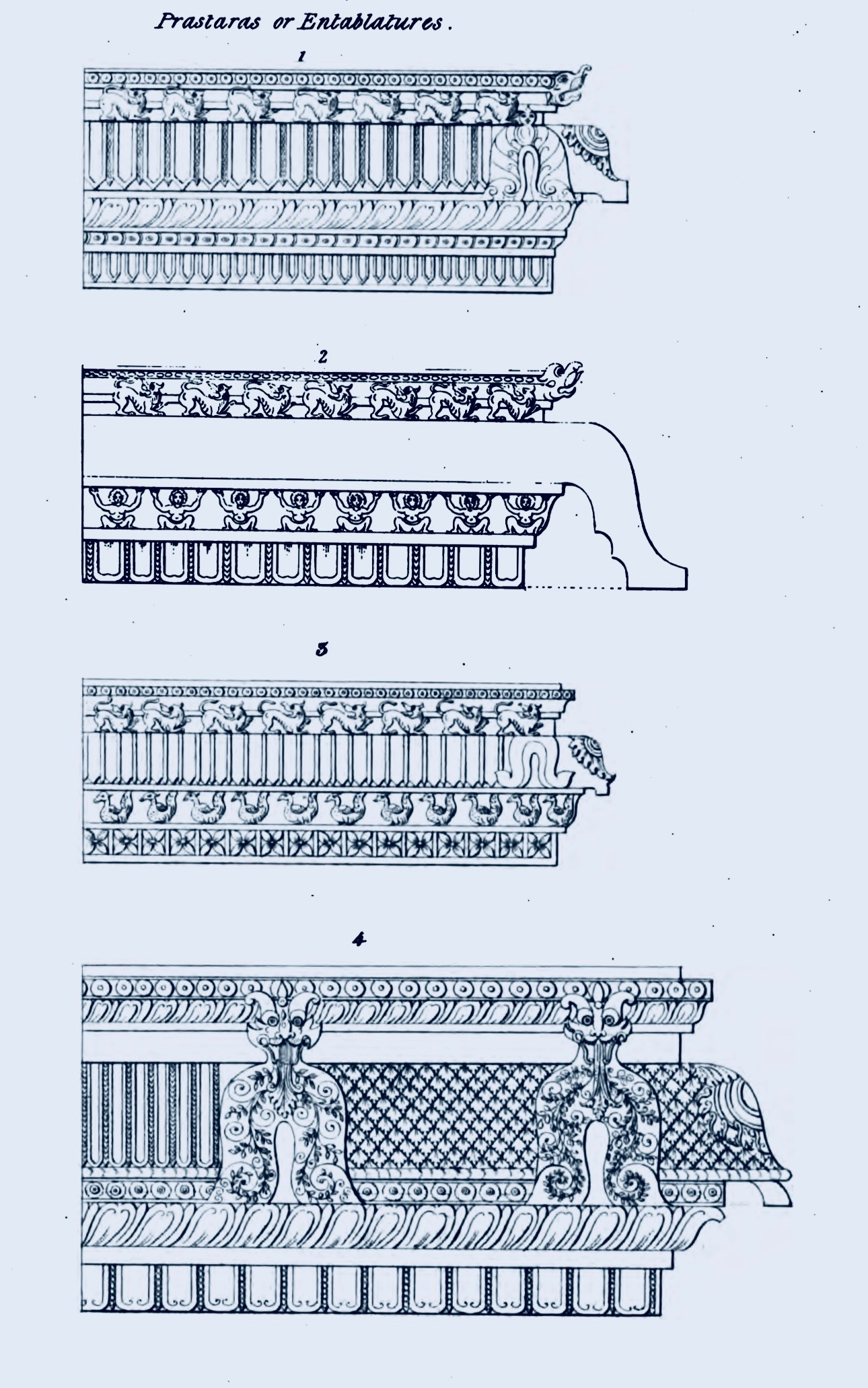
Entablature elements

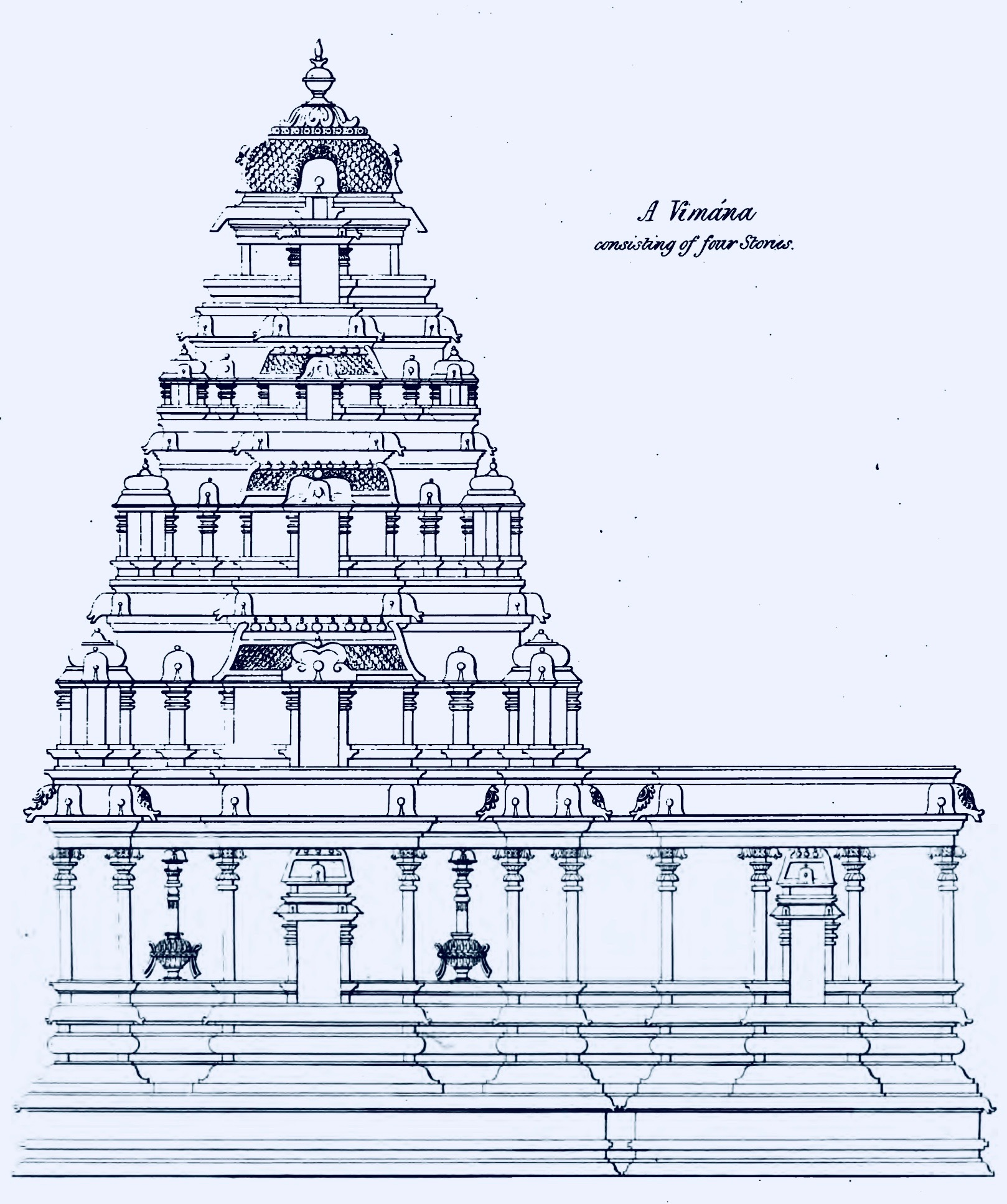
A vimana with mandapam elements (Dravidian architecture)

== See also ==
- Temple tank
- Vedic altars
- Indonesian architecture, Candi of Indonesia
- Rock-cut architecture
- Indian rock-cut architecture
- Architecture of Angkor
- Hemadpanthi architecture Style
- Dhvajastambha (flagstaff)
