= Doddabasappa Temple =

12th-century temple in Dambal, Karnataka state, India

Coordinates: 15°19′41″N 75°48′37″E

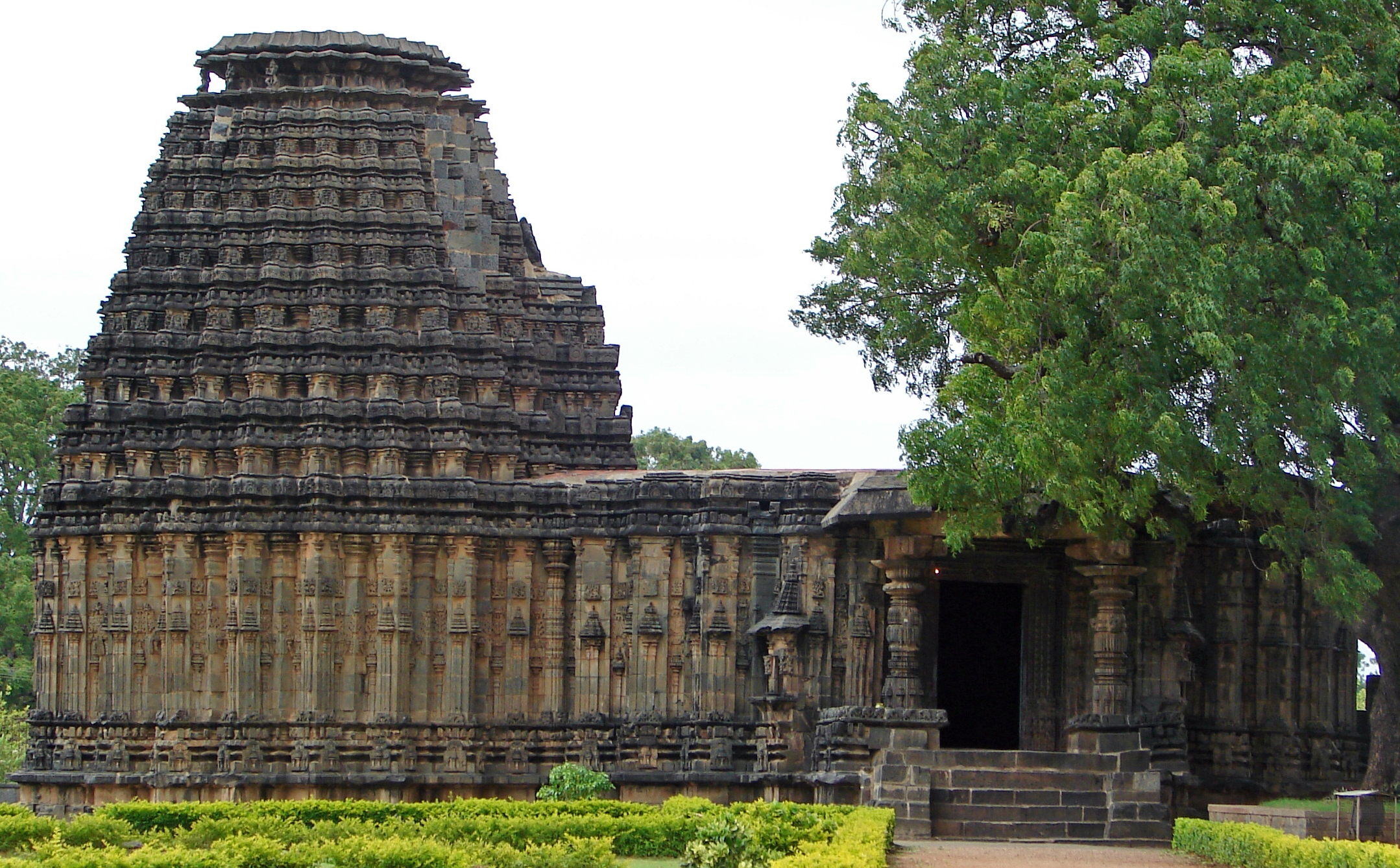
Dodda Basappa Temple at Dambal, a unique 24-pointed, uninterrupted stellate (star-shaped), seven-tiered dravida plan, 12th century CE

Doddabasappa Temple (Kannada: ದೊಡ್ಡಬಸಪ್ಪ ದೇವಸ್ಥಾನ) is a 12th-century Western Chalukyan architectural innovation in Dambal, Karnataka state, India. Dambal is about 20 km (12 mi) southeast of Gadag city and 24 km (15 mi) southwest of Ittagi in Koppal district. The sanctum contains a Shiva linga, the symbol of the presiding deity, God Shiva. The temple interior is a standard construction and consists of a sanctum (cella), a vestibule (antarala) and a main mantapa (also called navaranga or hall). The vestibule connects the sanctum to the mantapa. The Western Chalukya monuments, regional variants of existing dravida (South Indian) temples, defined the Karnata dravida architectural tradition.

== Temple plan ==
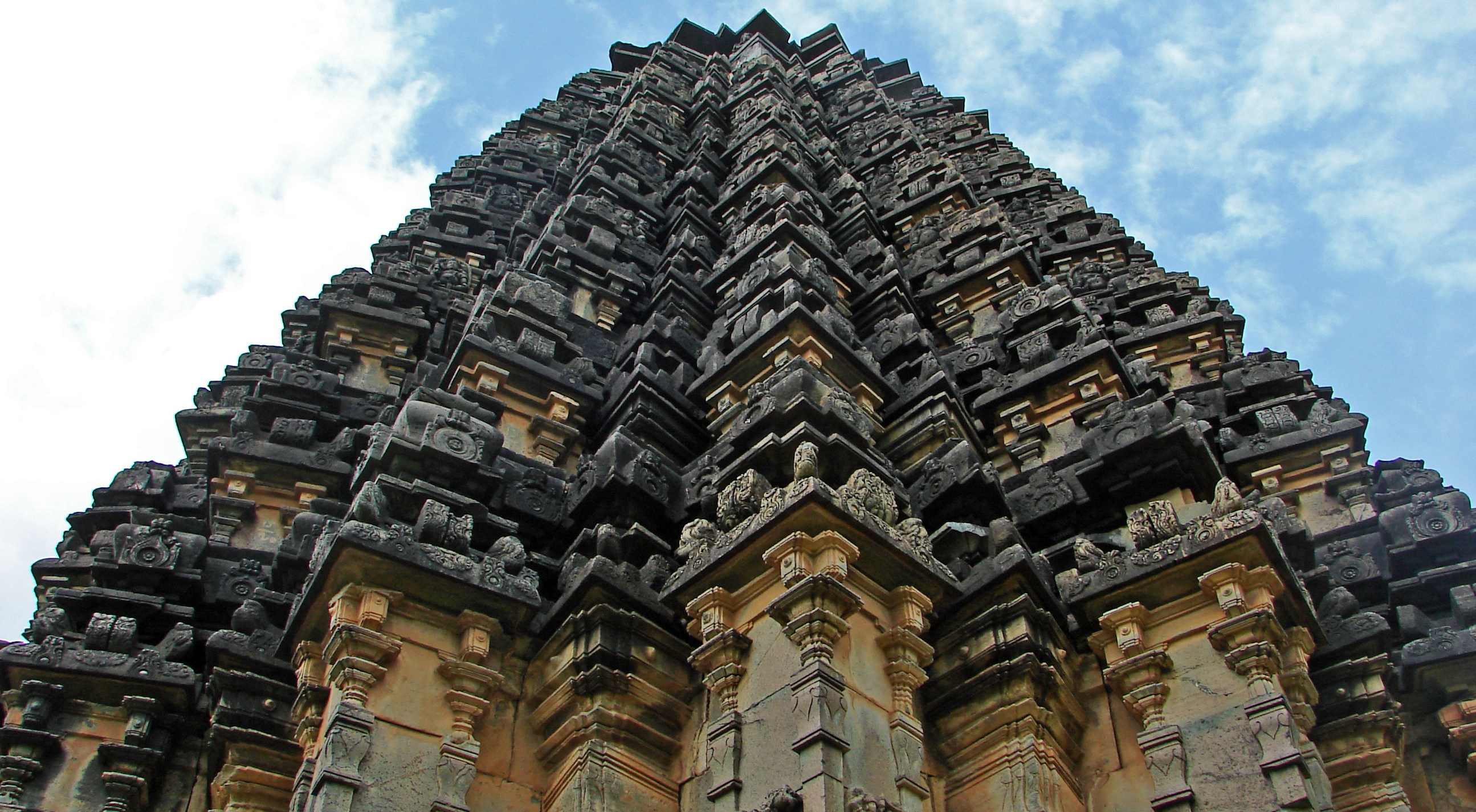
Twenty-four pointed stellate plan of vimana of Dodda Basappa Temple in Dambal, 12th century CE

Reliefs on the walls of the temple at Dodda Basappa Dambal, 1897

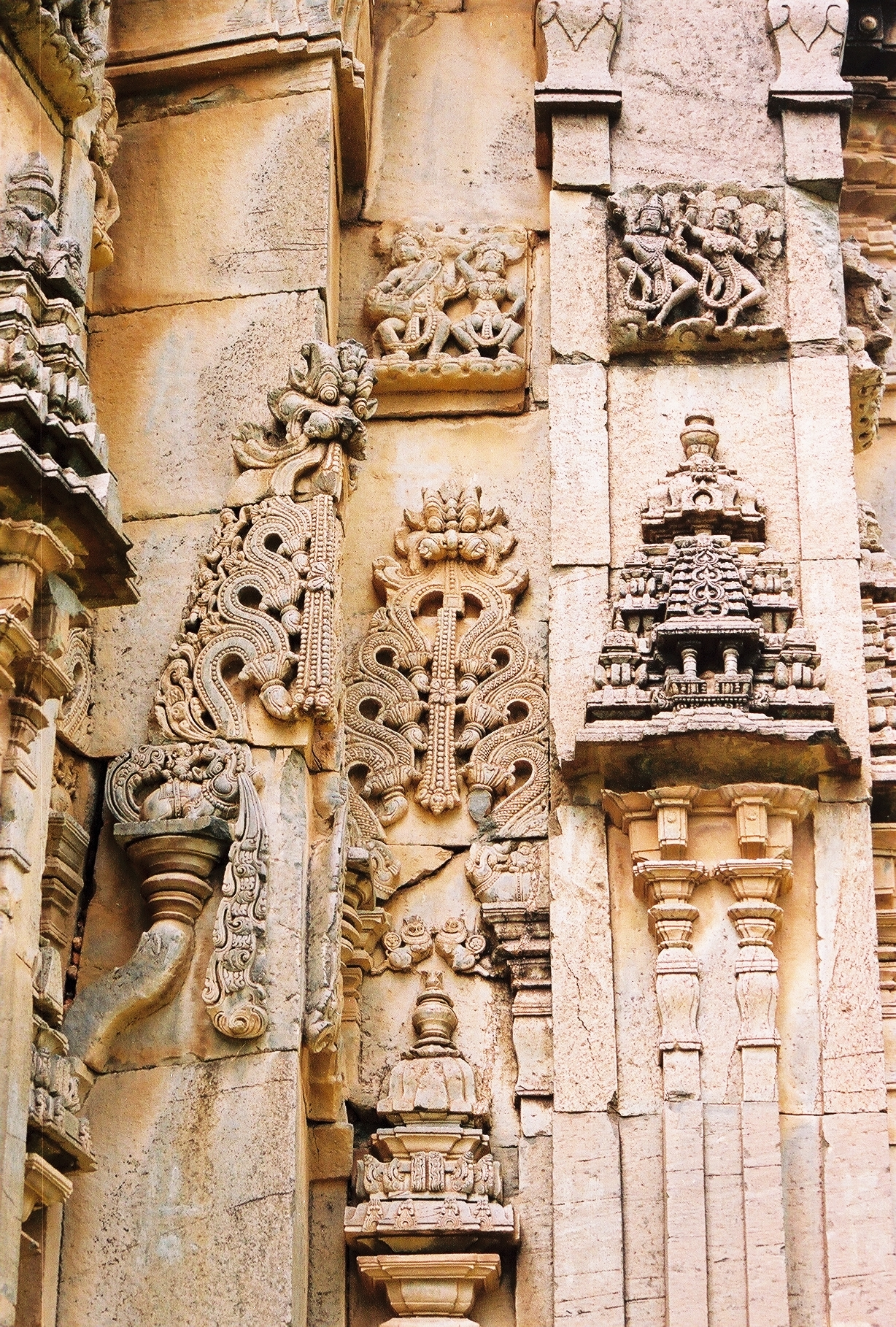
Wall relief in projections and recesses: Kirtimukha, Pilasters and dravida style miniature towers (aedicule)

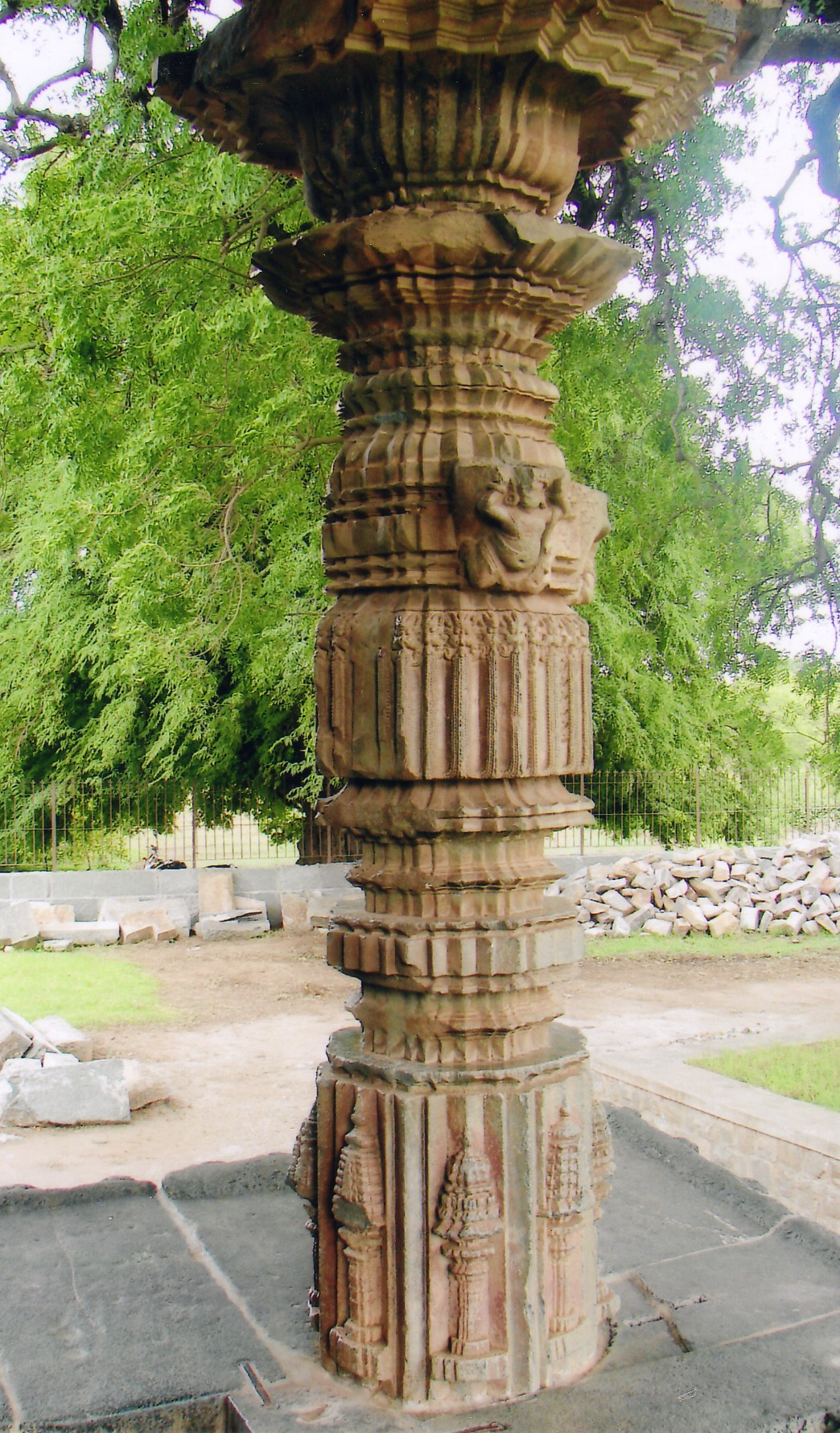
Half pillar supports the roof of the porch

=== Stellate plan ===
The temple is based on a very original 24-pointed uninterrupted stellate (star-shaped) plan and uses soapstone as its basic building material. Contemporary stellate plans of the Bhumija shrines in central India where the inspiration for this temple came from, were all 32-pointed interrupted types. No temples of the 6-, 12-, or 24-pointed stellate plans are known to exist in Karnataka or Maharashtra, with the exception of the Doddabasappa temple, which can be described as a 24-pointed uninterrupted plan. In an 'interrupted' stellate plan, the stellate outline is interrupted by orthogonal (right-angle) projections in the cardinal directions, resulting in star points that have been skipped.

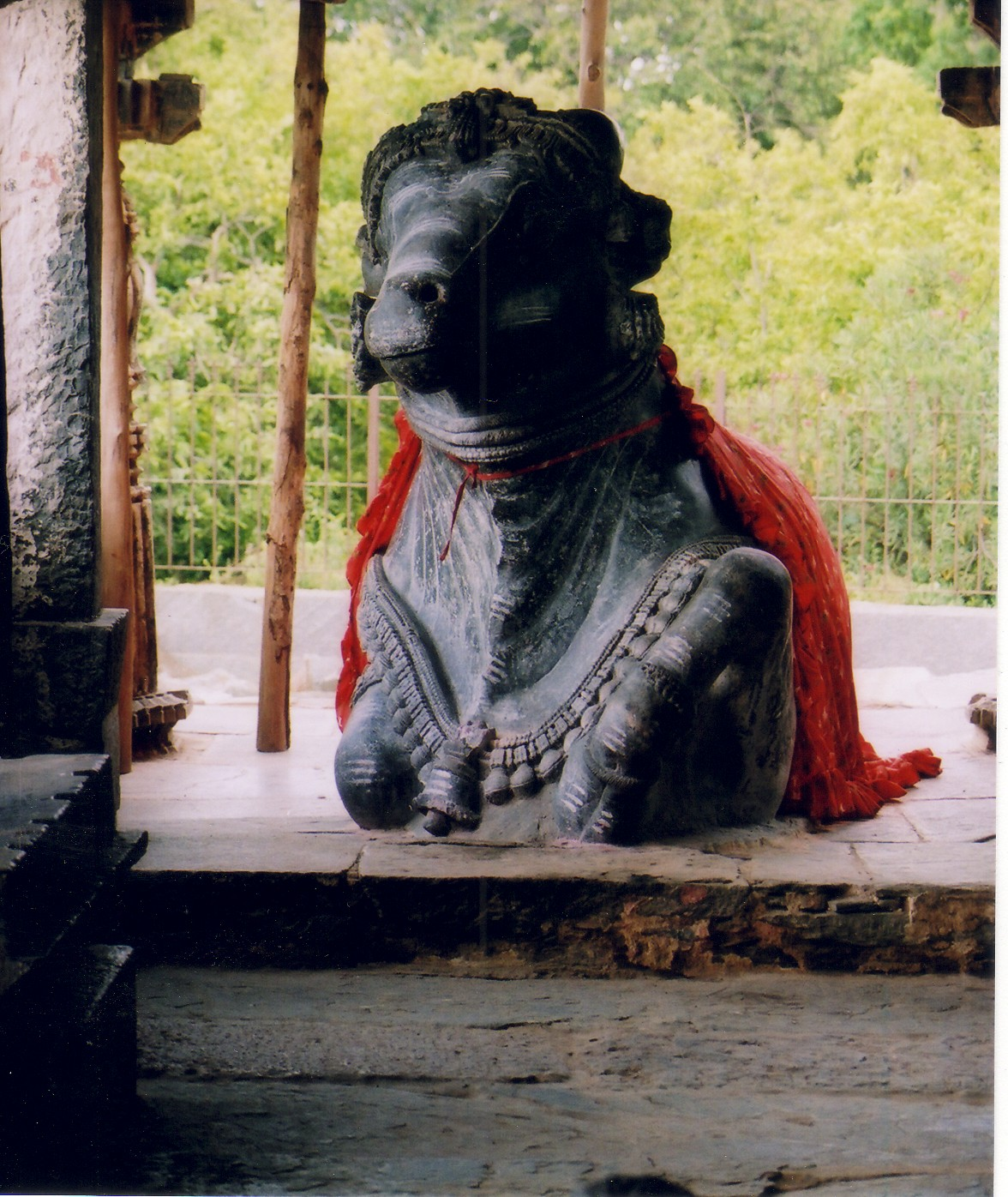
Nandi (vehicle of Shiva-bull) facing shrine through the eastern doorway

The Doddabasappa temple marks the mature development of the Chalukyan art which originated from basic dravida architecture of South India. Its departure from conventional dravida plan used in the Virupaksha temple in Pattadakal is so extreme that it would be very difficult to find similarities without detailed examination. A star shape is obtained by rotating a square about its centre. The star points form equidistant projections. The angles and re-entrant angles thus formed make the perimeter of the outerwall of the shrine.

The star projections are carried right up the superstructure (tower over the shrine — Shikhara), giving it an exotic look, though it loses strength in comparison to the square superstructures found in conventional dravida plans. The storied arrangement of the superstructure found in dravida plans is not easily distinguishable here. The upper tiers of the seven-tiered (tala) superstructure look like cogged wheels with 48 dents.

=== Other details ===
The pillars in this temple are finely chiseled and "complicated" but lack the elegance of those at the Kasivisvesvara Temple in Lakkundi. The entrance to the shrine has above it a decorative architrave with space for images (now missing) of the Hindu Gods Brahma, Vishnu and Shiva. Depending on the dedication of the temple, either Vishnu or Shiva would take the central position in this arrangement. The entrance to the sanctum is elaborately decorated on either side with designs that are floral containing tiny images of dancers, musicians and even a mithuna couple (Gemini). In the main mantapa (hall) there are three images, one of the "five headed" Brahma and his vehicle (vahana), the goose, and two images are of Surya, the Sun God.

The temple has two doorways each with a porch, one facing south and the other facing east. The east facing door has on either side the remains of what must have been elegant lintel decoration, and an open hall type of pillared extension containing a large recumbent image of Nandi (bull) which faces the shrine.
