= Dambal =

Dambal Dambal
- Village
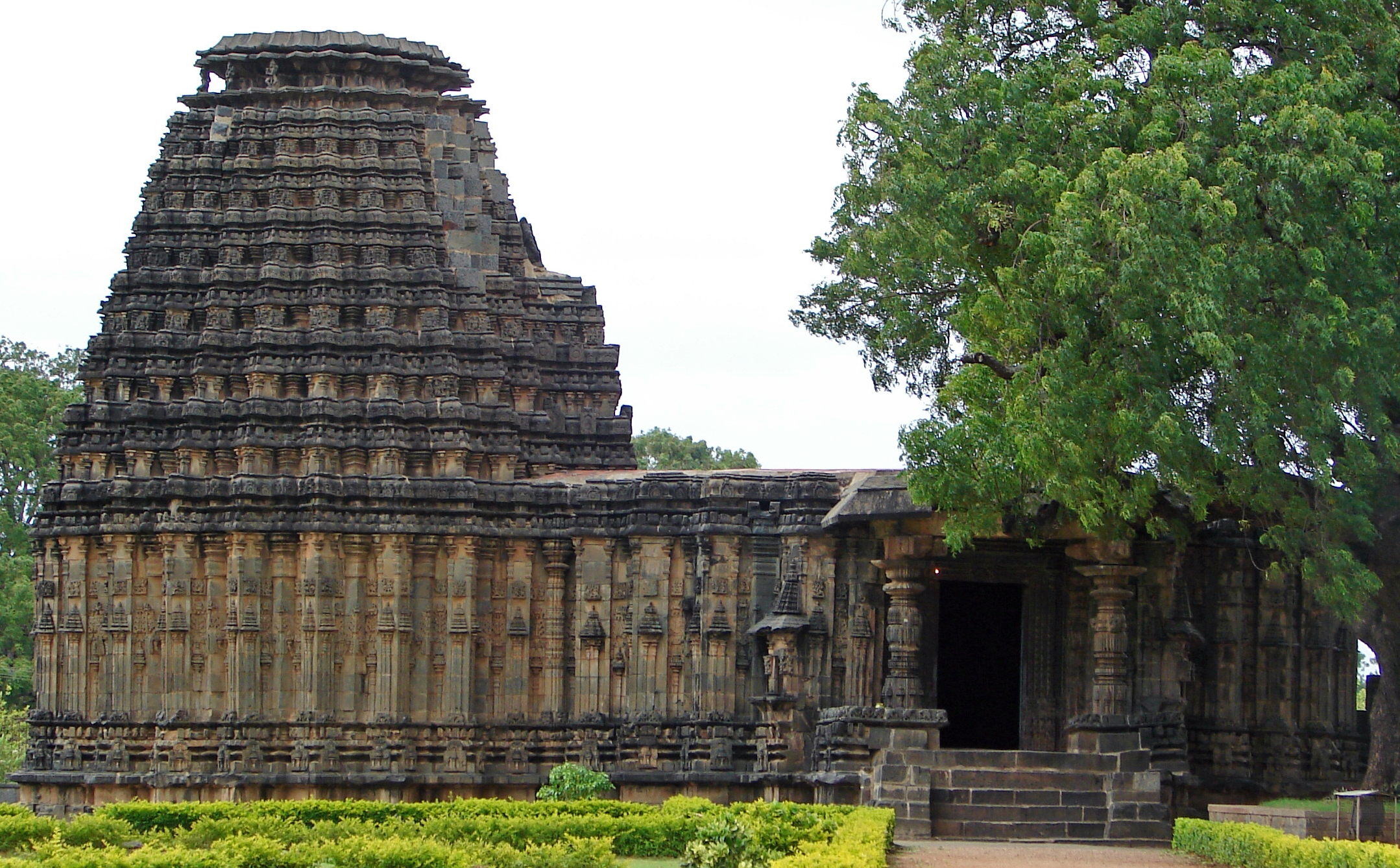
- Doddabasappa Temple at Dambal, 12th century CE

- Location in Karnataka, India Dambal (India)
- Coordinates: 15°19′41″N 75°48′37″E
- Country: India
- State: Karnataka
- District: Gadag District
- Taluk: Mundargi
- Lok Sabha Constituency: Haveri

Government
  - Body: Gram panchayat
- Elevation: 590 m (1,940 ft)

Population (2001)
  - Total: 10,095

Languages
  - Official: Kannada
- Time zone: UTC+5:30 (IST)
- Postal code: 582 113
- ISO 3166 code: IN-KA
- Vehicle registration: KA 26
- Website: karnataka.gov.in

Dambala is a village in the gadag district of the state of Karnataka, India. It was an ancient center of Buddhism and remained so as late as the 12th century. Dambal is at an elevation of 590 m (1,940 ft).

== Demographics ==
As of 2001 India census, Dambala had a population of 10,095 with 5,166 males and 4,929 females and 1,815 Households.

== History ==
Under the rule of the Mauryas and Satavahana, the teachings of Buddha flourished in Karnataka. Buddhist relics are found scattered around the town.

In a temple of the Buddhist deity Tara in Dambal, there is an inscription dated 1095 AD, a temple built by 16 merchants for the deity Tara and a vihara for Buddhist monks. Although Buddhism was assimilated by the growing popularity of Hinduism, there was a Buddhist centre in Dambal as late as the 12th century.

== Doddabasappa Temple ==
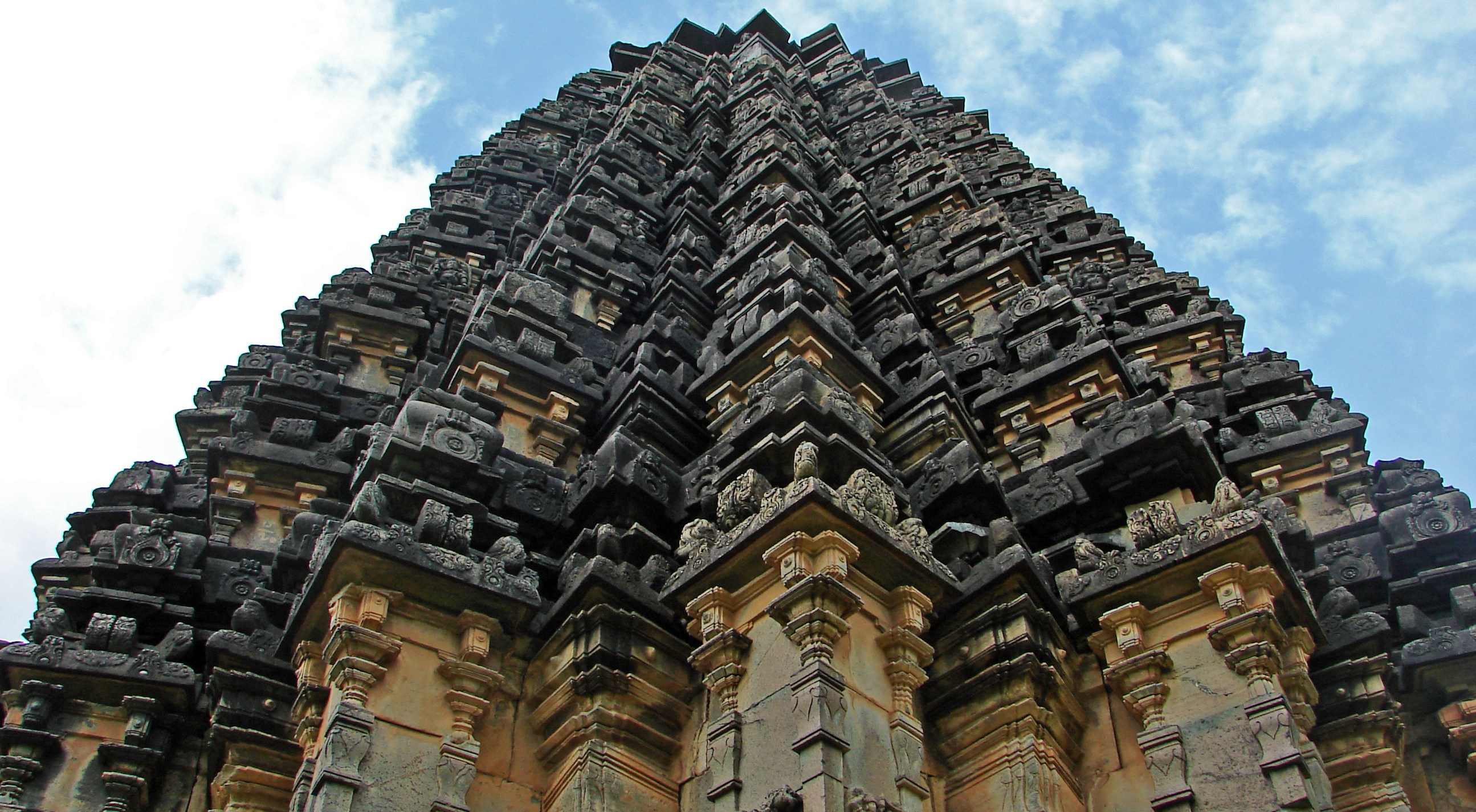
Doddabasappa Temple at Dambal, 12th century CE

There are three Hindu temples here. The Doddabasappa Temple is of the Western Chalukya architectural style and has a twenty-four pointed stellate plan for the vimana with so many star points that it almost becomes circular in appearance. Each right angle is divided into four 22.5 degrees angles. Then each angle is again divided and covered with intricate carvings.

== Jappadbavi ==
Recently discovered the temple well locals call it as Jappadbavi.

== Kappata gudda ==
Kappata gudda hill is very near to Dambal, the famous Kappata Malleshwara Temple is about 5 miles from Dambal.

== See also ==
- North Karnataka
- Tourism in North Karnataka
- Gadag
- Lakkundi
- Mahadeva Temple (Itagi)
- Vesara
