= Kasivisvesvara Temple, Lakkundi =

Temple in the Gadag district of Karnataka state, India

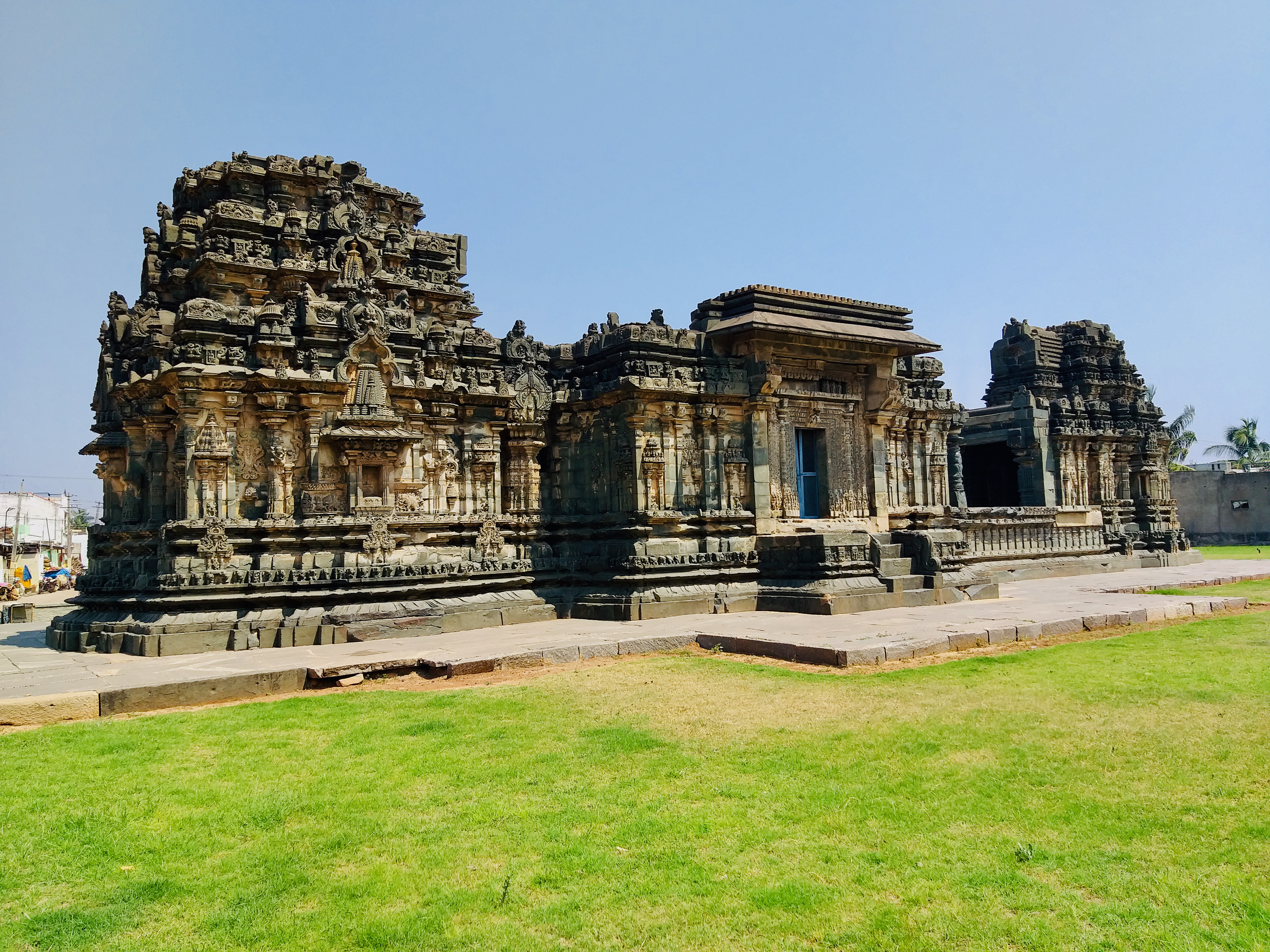
- Kasivisvesvara temple

- Location within Karnataka Kasivisvesvara Temple, Lakkundi (India)

Religion
- Affiliation: Hinduism
- Deity: Shiva, Surya
- Governing body: Archaeological Survey of India

Location
- Location: Lakkundi, Karnataka
- Coordinates: 15°23′14.6″N 75°43′01.4″E

Architecture
- Style: Western Chalukya architecture
- Established: 1025 CE
- Temple: 1

The Kasivisvesvara temple (Kannada: ಕಾಶಿವಿಶ್ವೇಶ್ವರ ದೇವಸ್ಥಾನ), also referred to as the Kavatalesvara, Kashivishveshvara or Kashi Vishvanatha temple of Lakkundi is located in the Gadag district of Karnataka state, India. It is about 12 kilometres (7.5 mi) from Gadag city, between Hampi and Goa. (Note: This temple should not be confused with similarly named temples in India; there are numerous temples all over the Indian subcontinent that are called Kasivisvesvara or Kashi Vishwanatha.) The Kasivisvesvara temple is one of the best illustrations of fully developed Kalyana Chalukya style of Hindu architecture.

The Kasivisvesvara temple has two sanctums facing each other and sharing a mandapa. The larger sanctum is dedicated to Shiva, the other to Surya. It is notable not only for the three dimensional miniature reliefs and fine details of its artwork, the temple is also notable, states James Harle, for integrating all three major styles of Hindu temple architecture – the Nagara, the Vesara and the Dravida.

== Location ==
Lakkundi is about 12 kilometers from the twin city of Gadag-Betageri, between Hampi and Goa, connected by India's National Highway 67. A home to numerous ruins of historic Hindu and Jain temples, Lakkundi is geographically located in a region with many major temple groups from the Kalachuris, Chalukyas, Yadavas-Seunas, Hoysalas and Vijayanagara era. For example, it is close to historic temples found in Dambal, Kukkanur, Gadag, Annigeri, Mulgund, Harti, Laksmesvara, Kalkeri, Savadi, Hooli, Rona, Sudi, Koppal, and Itagi. The nearest Railway station is in Gadag city. The Kasivisvesvara temple is located towards the south of the village.

== History ==
Lakkundi is phonetically shortened name of the historic city of Lokkigundi, a name found in inscriptions in the village and those quite far in southern Karnataka and Maharashtra. The earliest surviving inscription was discovered by British archaeologists on a stone slab near Kanner Bhanvi – a step well in Lakkundi. The inscribed stone slab was being used by local dhobis (laundry washerman) to wash clothes at the step well. The inscription on it dates to 790 CE. This inscription confirms that Lakkundi was already in existence and significant enough for an inscription by the 8th-century. James Fergusson – the 19th-century Scottish historian known for his archaeological and architectural studies in India, reported over 30 more inscriptions from Lakkundi, in Kannada and Sanskrit, most of which range between the 11th and 12th century. Some of these were foundation stone inscriptions of Jain and Hindu temples, others gifts to different temples, to Maha-agrahara, to monasteries such as Hiree Matha (now lost), to donate step wells for the public and pilgrims, and other purposes. Though damaged, many of them include the Saka year of the inscription. The profusion of these inscriptions attests to the importance of Lakkundi as a historic city to both Hindu and Jain traditions.

Many more inscriptions on stone and copper plates mentioning Lokkugundi have been discovered far from Lakkundi. However, in this part of ancient and medieval Karnataka, Lokkugundi is among the most mentioned cities. By 1884, some thirty five Hindu and Jain inscriptions dated to between the 9th and 13th-century CE had been found that mention Lokkugundi. Though Lakkundi was an established town in the second half of the 1st millennium, its growth and wealth came after 973 CE when Taila II, a Chalukya of Vatapi descendant and chieftain appointed in 965 CE, organized a successful revolt against Karkka II of the Rashtrakuta dynasty. In regional texts, the reign that followed is called Cālukya (Later Chalukyas, Kalyani Chalukyas, or Chalukyas of Kalyana) to distinguish them from the Calukya (Early Chalukyas). Lakkundi flowered and grew with the Shiva-tradition Hindu monarch Satyasraya Irivabedanga – the successor and son of Taila II who came to power in 997 or 998 CE. This is attested by both Jain and Hindu inscriptions of early 11th-century.

Lakkundi grew to be a major city, prosperous and one with a mint. Lakkundi and several historic towns to its north – such as Rona, Sudi, Kradugu now known as Gadag, Hooli and others – attracted a burst of religious, cultural and literary flowering from the 11th to 13th century, with ever more sophisticated temple architectures, Vidyadana (charity supported schools) and public works such as step wells. These are largely in the context of Shaivism and Jainism, though a few major temples of Vaishnavism here are also from this period. In 1192 CE, after many of the remarkable temples of Lakkundi were already standing, a Sanskrit inscription of Hoysala king Ballala II re-affirms the continued importance of Lakkundi and it becoming his capital. After the 13th-century, there is an abrupt end to all evidence of new public works, temples, inscriptions and other indirect signs of economic prosperity in Lakkundi.

=== Date ===
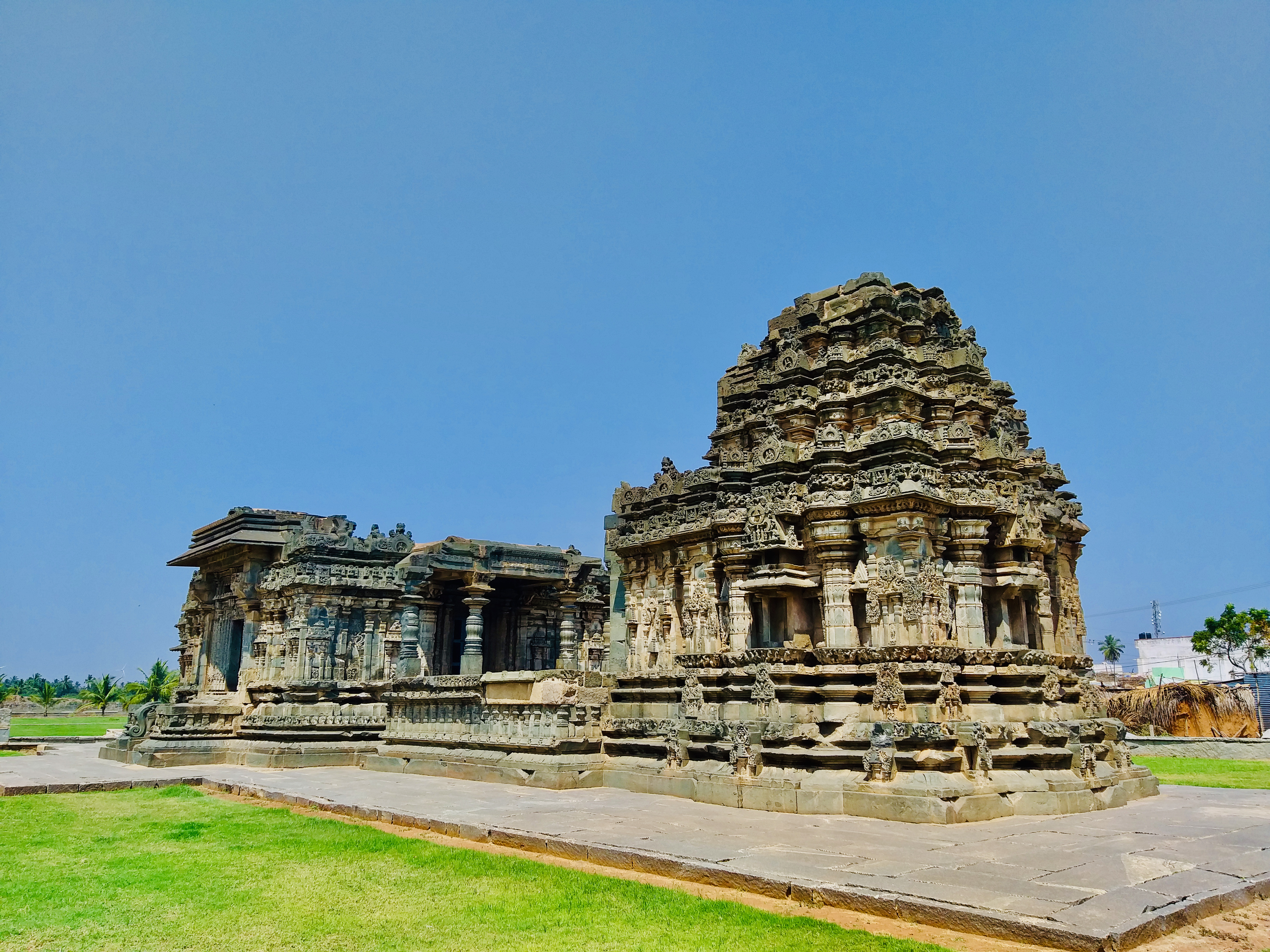
11th century Kasivisvesvara temple

The Kasivisvesvara temple is generally dated between early 11th-century to about mid 12th-century. The colonial era historians and archaeologists such as James Campbell and Henry Cousens, led by the hypothesis of Colonel Meadows Taylor – an influential and prolific writer on the history of South India, suggested two periods of construction. First completion by 11th-century, then a partial destruction by the Cholas, followed by reconstruction sometime in the 12th-century. Dhaky and Meister – scholars of Indian temple architecture who have authored numerous treatises and books about the historic monuments on the Indian subcontinent, date the extant temple to between 1020 and 1030 CE, though in earlier remarks Dhaky had speculated "could be around 1010". Adam Hardy, another specialist on temple architecture in India, states that the Kasivisvesvara temple must have been completed before 1087 CE. Henry Cousens published an early opinion of a two stage construction in 1926 based on Colonel Meadows' reliance on an exaggerated tale of destruction and victories by the Chola court. This view is flawed, states Hardy, and has "given rise to the misconception" that the Kasivisvesvara temple may have been damaged by the Cholas and then rebuilt in the 12th-century. The iconographic and architectural details of the Kasivisvesvara temple when considered in the context other temples built by the Lakkundi and the Sudi schools in this region in the 11th and 12th century, states Ajay Sinha – an Art and Architecture historian, suggest that Kasivisvesvara as it has survived is from c. 1075 CE.

== Temple plan ==
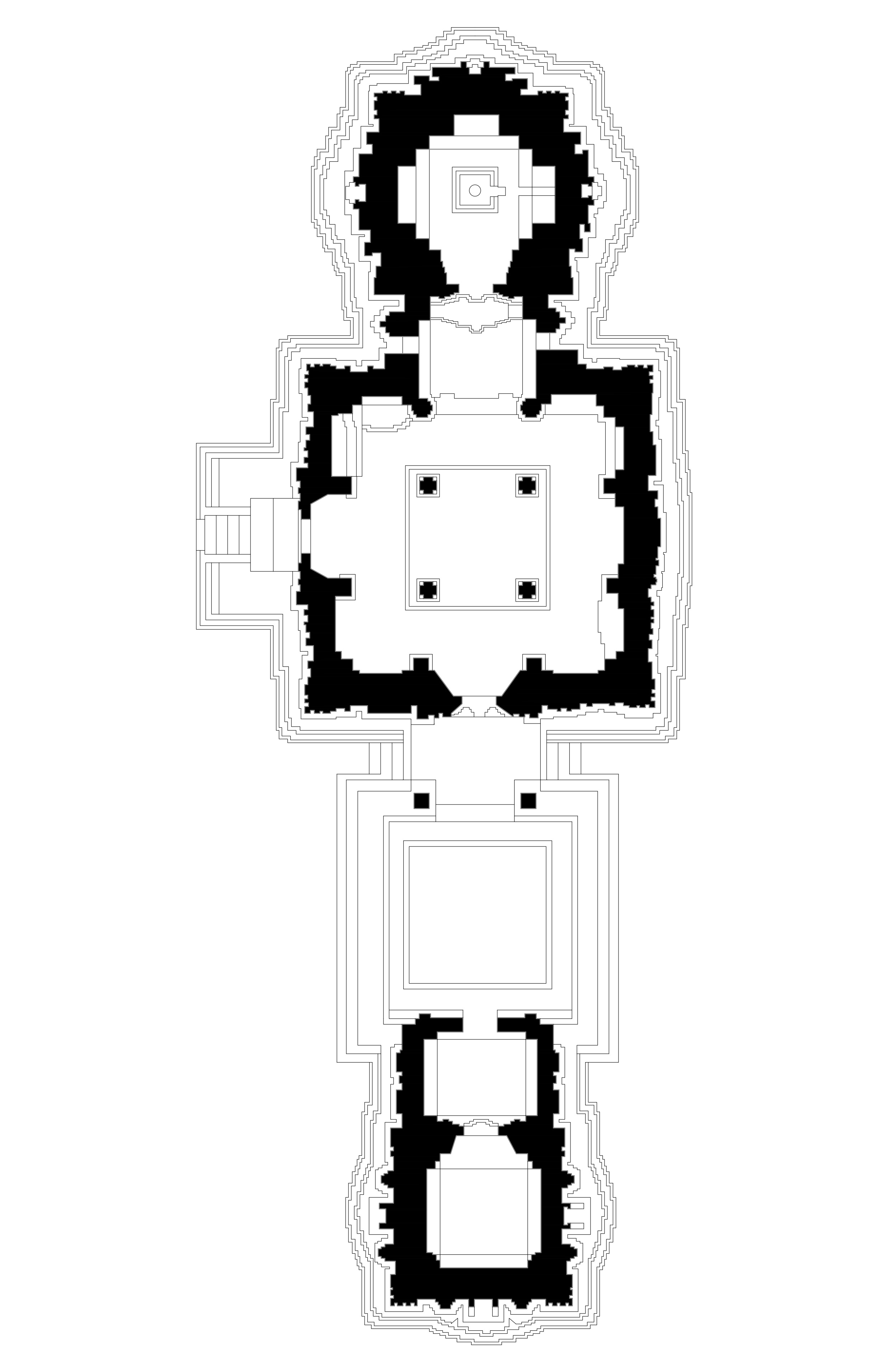
11th century Kasivisvesvara temple plan Lakkundi Karnataka

This is a double shrined temple (dvikuta), one co-axially aligned. The larger shrine faces east and is dedicated to Shiva (Kasivisvesvara, Kashivishwanatha). The somewhat smaller shrine is dedicated to the Hindu sun god Surya (Suryanarayana). They are connected by a ranga-mandapa and a gudha-mandapa. The temple sits on a molded platform, one provided by steps to the rangamandapa as well as the gudhamandapa, in a manner similar to the Rashtrakuta style of Hindu architecture. The superstructure above the sanctums are damaged, but the portions that survive when studied with the pitha and outer structure, indicate an exceptional approach to integrating the architecture from the northern parts of subcontinent (Nagara), west (Maru-Gurjara), south (Dravida) and central–east (Vesara). (Note: Vesara was the fusion and synthesis where architectural ideas from the north and south were combined and innovated upon in Deccan–Odisha region; some sophisticated Vesara examples are found in the Hoysala temples.) While aspects of this synthetic innovation are also found in few other Lakkundi temples such as the Nanneswara temple and those at Aihole, this temple's plan and execution is the best successful example that has survived from the Kalyana Chalukyan era. According to Adam Hardy, this and other Lakkundi temples reflect the evolution of one of the historic trends that we now call as the Lakkundi school, their achievements seen in the Hindu temples at Kukkanur, Mudhol and Rona. The Lakkundi school competed in northern Karnataka with the historic Sudi school of architecture illustrated by the Hindu temples in Aihole, Mahakut, Banashankari and Sudi.

The temple includes architectural developments in northern India. This is evidenced by the fact that the pilasters are decorated with miniature aedicules from North Indian Hindu temples, namely the Sekhari-Nagara and Bhumija-Nagara. The miniature towers reflect the repetitive emanating shrines idea, a spiritual principle traceable in the Rig Veda. Other northern ideas they incorporated were the pillar bodies that appeared as wall projections. Well-known constructions incorporating these features are found at the Kasivisvesvara Temple and the nearby Nannesvara Temple.

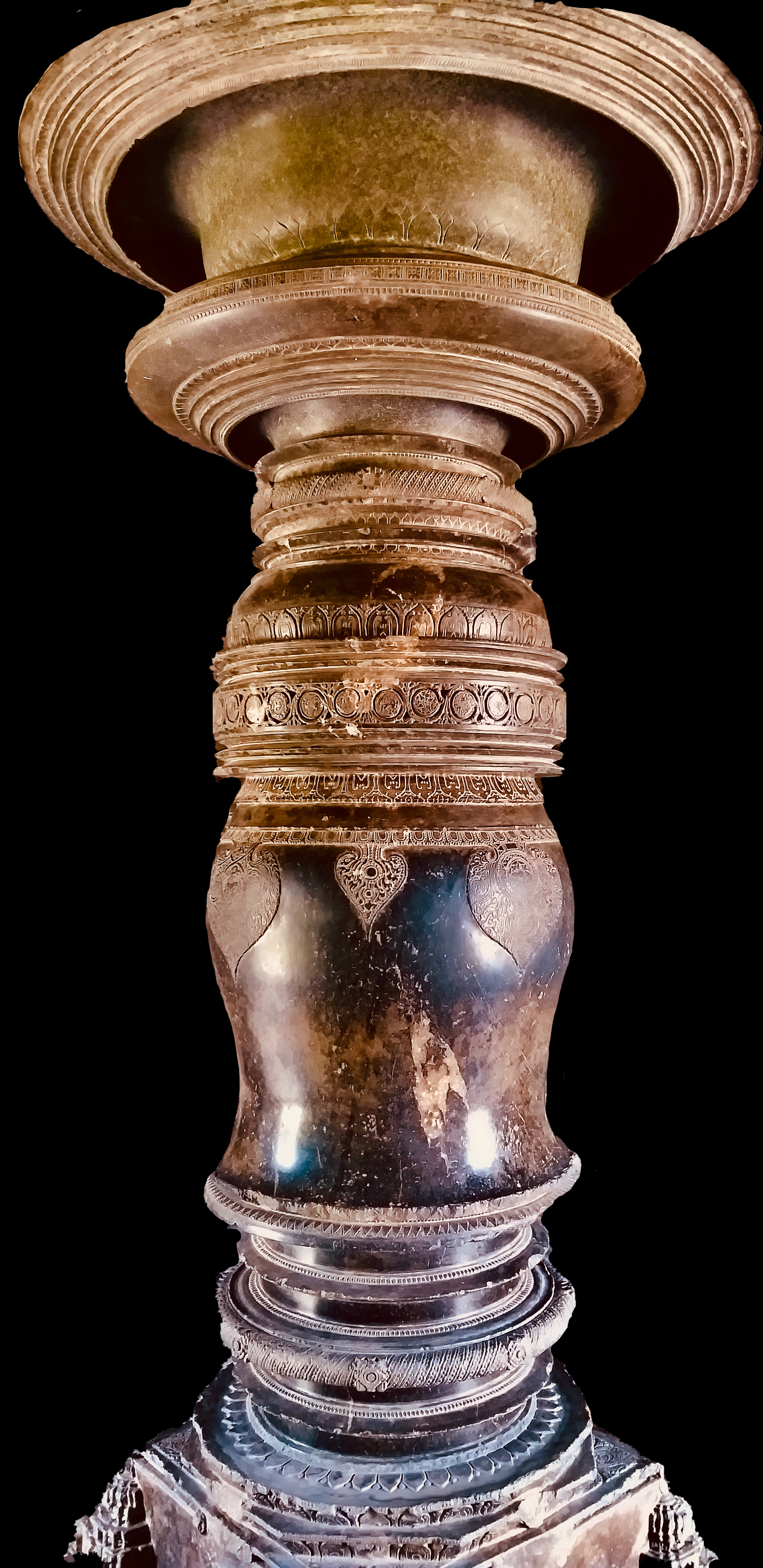
A pillar inside the Kasivisvesvara mandapa.

== Architecture ==
The Lakkundi temples follow the traditions and experimentation in architecture and arts (vastu sastra, silpa sastra) that began in the region between northern and southern tributaries of Krishna River, particularly the Malaprabha and Tungabhadra rivers. The surviving examples of these stretch from Aihole, Pattadakal to Alampur, Srisailam and Biccavolu regions (north Karnata, Andhradesa and Telingana). (Note: This tradition can be traced from a region south of Goa and stretching to the Kalinga region of southwest Odisha. See Harle's Chapter 18, and Dhaky.) These show artisans and architects from the different regions and traditions of the Indian subcontinent sharing ideas, creating and innovating new temple designs where sections of the temple, including the towering superstructure over the sanctums combine and improve upon the north and south Indian designs (spire, sikhara, vimana). The earliest Lakkundi temple, the Brahma Jinalaya Jain temple, shows a continuity with the architecture found in the Kukkanur Hindu temple. The Kasivisvesvara temple attests to a stage of rapid, bold and elaborate synthesis of different styles on an imperial scale. It exemplifies the Vesara-style Hindu temple architecture, a major innovation of the 11th-century.

=== Superstructure ===
The larger shrine has a three storey (tritala) vimana with beautifully rendered wall-pilasters, one with a bifacial pallavi and bharaputraka-figures in the upper section. Small kutastambhas are carved between the karna and pratikarna, capped with elaborate and rich toranas. The artwork in these kutastambhas and toranas are unique in their details around the superstructure, thus enlivening the space framed between each salilantara-depression as one circumambulates the shrines. The karna niches present Bhimija, Vesara and Dravida designs found in early Sanskrit texts.

=== Outer walls ===
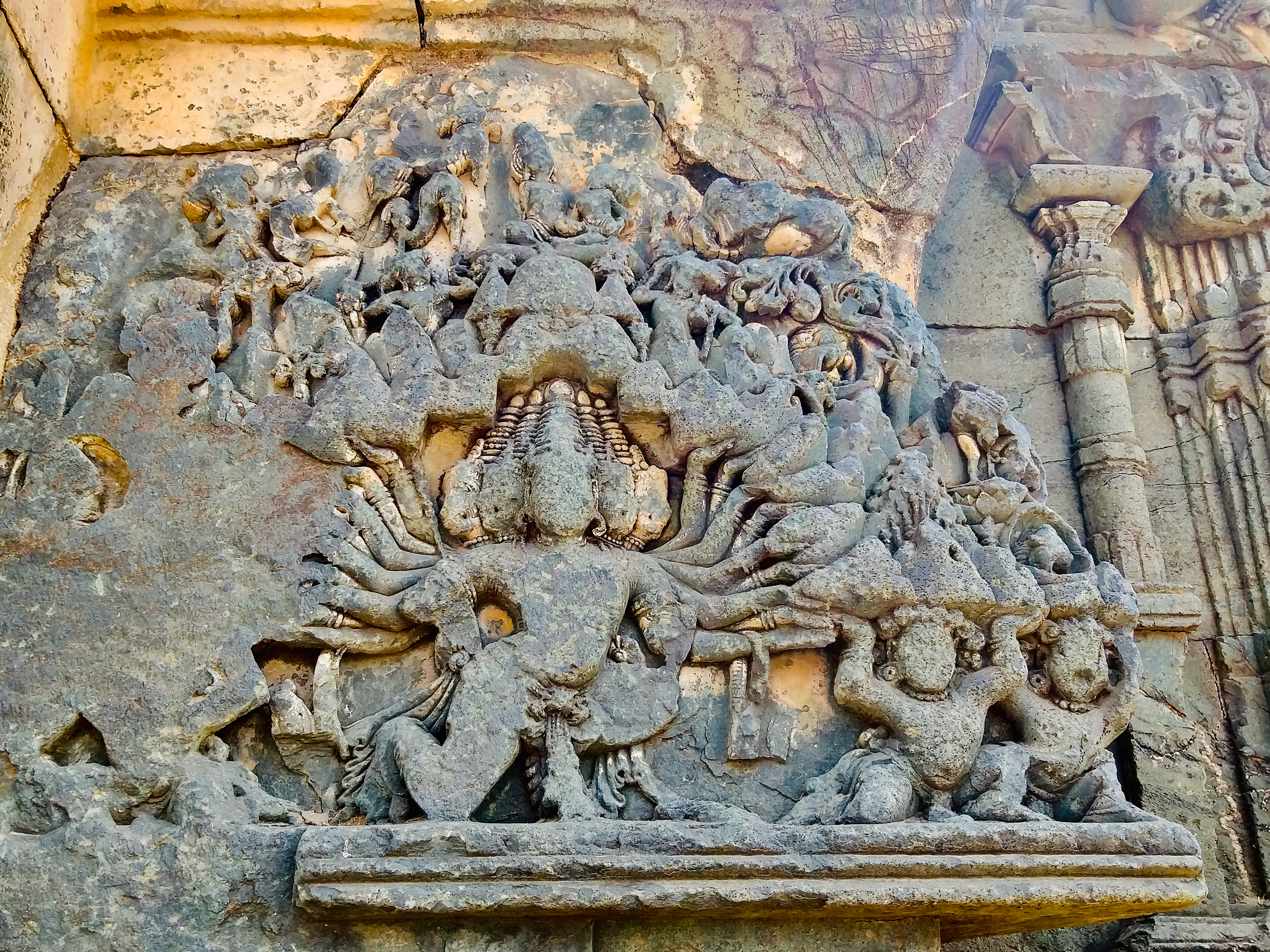
Defaced Ramayana scene on the outer walls, Ravana challenging Kailasha.

The upabhadra parts of the outer walls are equally innovative. Along with decorative elements drawn from themes of nature, they are filled with narrative scenes from Hindu legends. In particular, elephant-themed legends from the Mahabharata, the Ramayana and the Shiva Purana are depicted, for instance the Gajantaka, the Kailasaharana and the Tarakasura-vadha legends.

In the khattaka-niche of the bhadra, there are traces of Hindu gods and goddesses. These are too mutilated to identify the deities. The damage seems deliberate, and not from erosion, because the decoration around the niche is in near original form and the shapes can be recognized. These niches show the north Indian Nagara-shikaras at the top with deep trifoil arch, and andakas at their base. The details are well preserved. This motif repeats vertically like fractals, diminishing in proportions. These repeating motifs are aligned. At the very top of these patterns is depicted the Nagara-ghantas and makara-malas, such as those found in the surviving north Indian temples. Since the top of the superstructure is missing, it is unclear how the shilpins had completed this synthesis at the very top.

The temple has two kapili-walls at each side. These have foliated wall pilasters that is boldly projecting. A prominent nasi combined with a smaller surnasi are shown being lifted by lions.

=== Gudha-mandapa ===
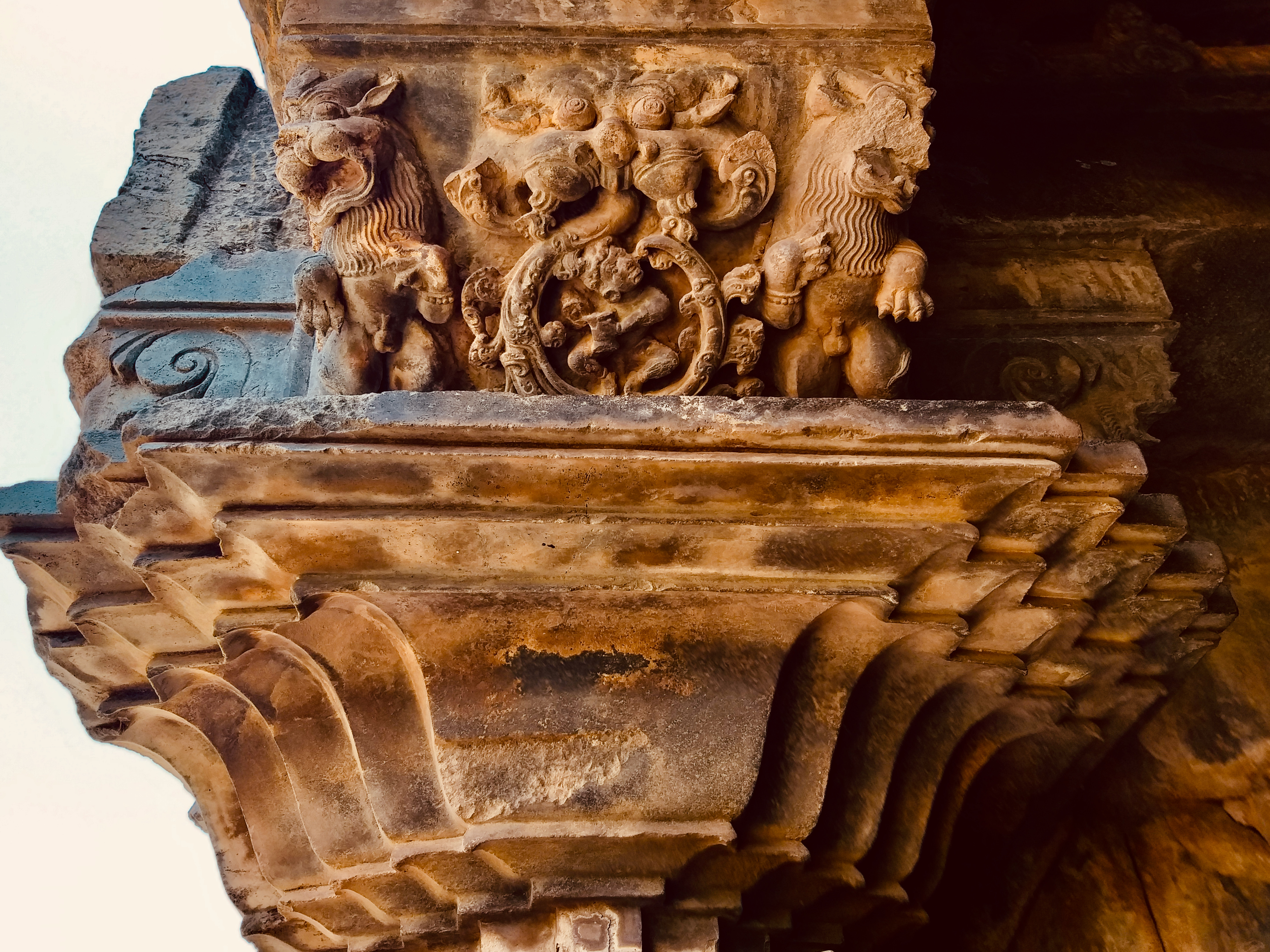
Artwork on a gudhamandapa pilaster. The two paired lions are the emblems of the Lakkundi school of shilpins.

The walls and pillars in the gudha-mandapa connecting the Shiva and Surya shrines suggest that the mandapa clearly had a roof. This roof was damaged and lost in later centuries. The mandapa and its walls that have survived show that this space and the architecture was relatively simple, with a uniform scheme of decoration and lacked the decoration, as if to prevent the pilgrims and devotees from standing and crowding the entrances to the Shiva and Surya temples. Instead, the sophisticated artwork is along the circumabulation paths on the platform around the temples, as well the entrances and inside the mandapa.

The doors at the entrances at the gudha-mandapa, states Dhaky, are "graced by a very highly ornate" artwork. They correspond to the teachings in to the Vastu Sastras, illustrating doorways reserved for temples built by a sovereign king. The doorways are a compound composition, an inner satsakha for Surya and saptasakha for Shiva, wrapped with an outer trisakha. These are parallel concentric bands of elaborate carvings. They show ratna (jewelled layer), artha (theme of people), two bands of kama (mithuna, amorous couples, eros), stambha, vyala, valli, and padma bands. Scholars such as Cousens, Campbell, Dhaky in different words call these as, " exquisitely carved and carefully finished" and one where the 11th-century artists achieved on the stone the craftsmanship one expects on "bronze and silver". It is, states Cousens, "delicate work of perforated filigree with fine tracery", completed such that the innumerable interstices cast a natural shadow. The blackness of this shadow accentuates the artwork on the stone; just how the artists used their tools and worked these small holes and forms, states Cousens, is "marvellous".

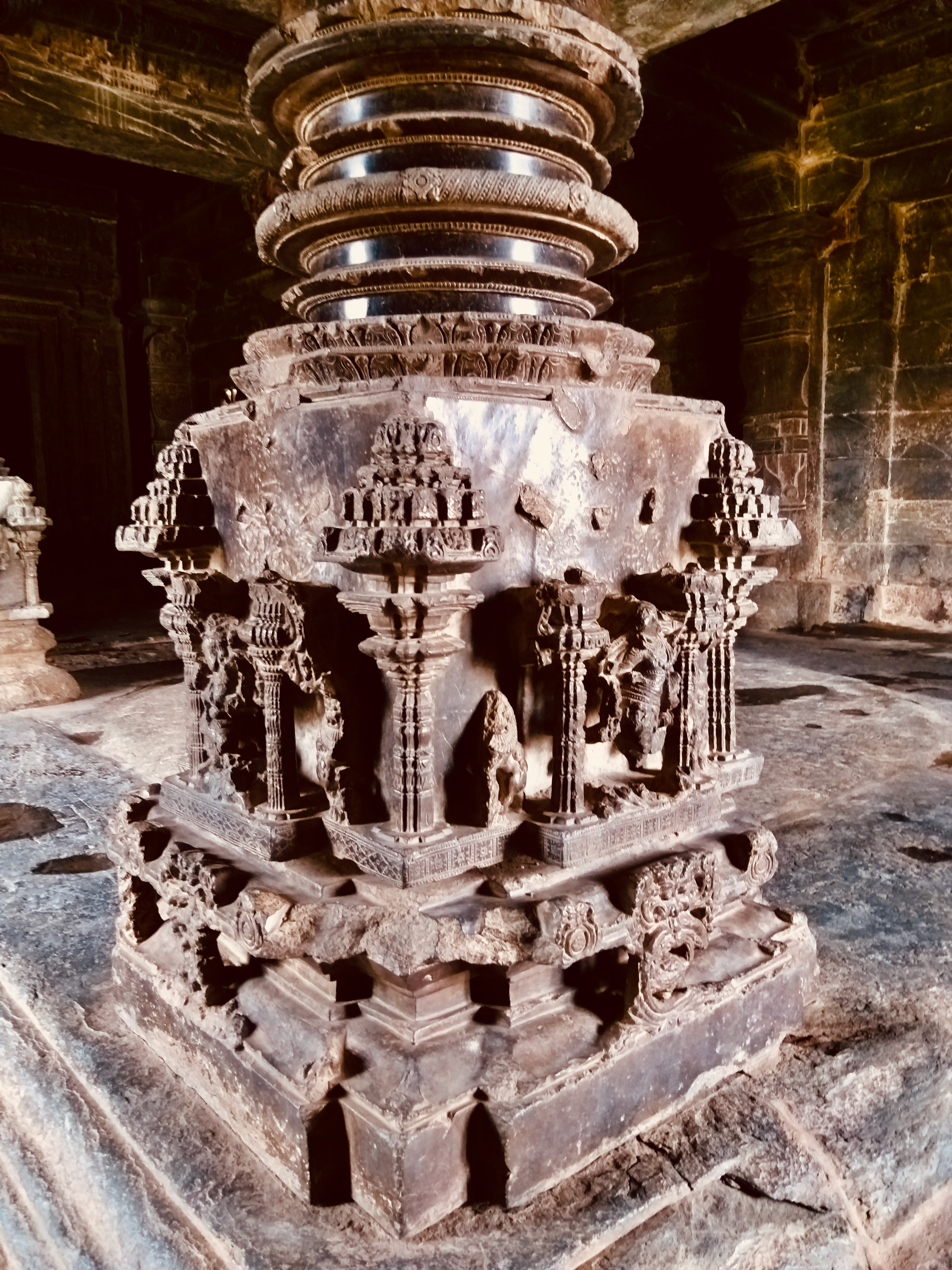
Lower section of the rangamandapa pillars.

These lalita-bimba of the door frames are graced by Abhiseka-Lakshmi like other Hindu temples. Above her are eleven Hindu deities, but too mutilated to identify just like the pedya human figures. The Srikara style pillars of the Gudhamandapa are similar to the Nannesvara temple nearby in Lakkundi. The notable artwork is found on the bhadraka wall-pilasters at the antarala, that is closer to the sanctum. It is bold and rich in decoration with details as though done on gold, with "festoons of pearl-strings", states Dhaky. As one enters the mandapa inside each shrine, above is an open lotus.

=== Ranga-mandapa ===
The ranga-mandapa in the Shiva temple is square and supported by beautiful lathe-carved pillars, that appear to have been polished and assembled. The smoothness and symmetry achieved in the massive stone pillar, states Cousens, is one expected with a pillar made of ivory or silver. The bottom of the pillars are carved in three dimensions (damaged), with framed sections highlighting Hindu motifs and depicting the epic legends. The brackets, above the capitals, have little lions, set within kirtimukhas. Pepal leaf scrolls highlight the otherwise smooth surface. To the south of the ranga-mandapa are stairs to enter the temple.

=== Garbha-gudi ===
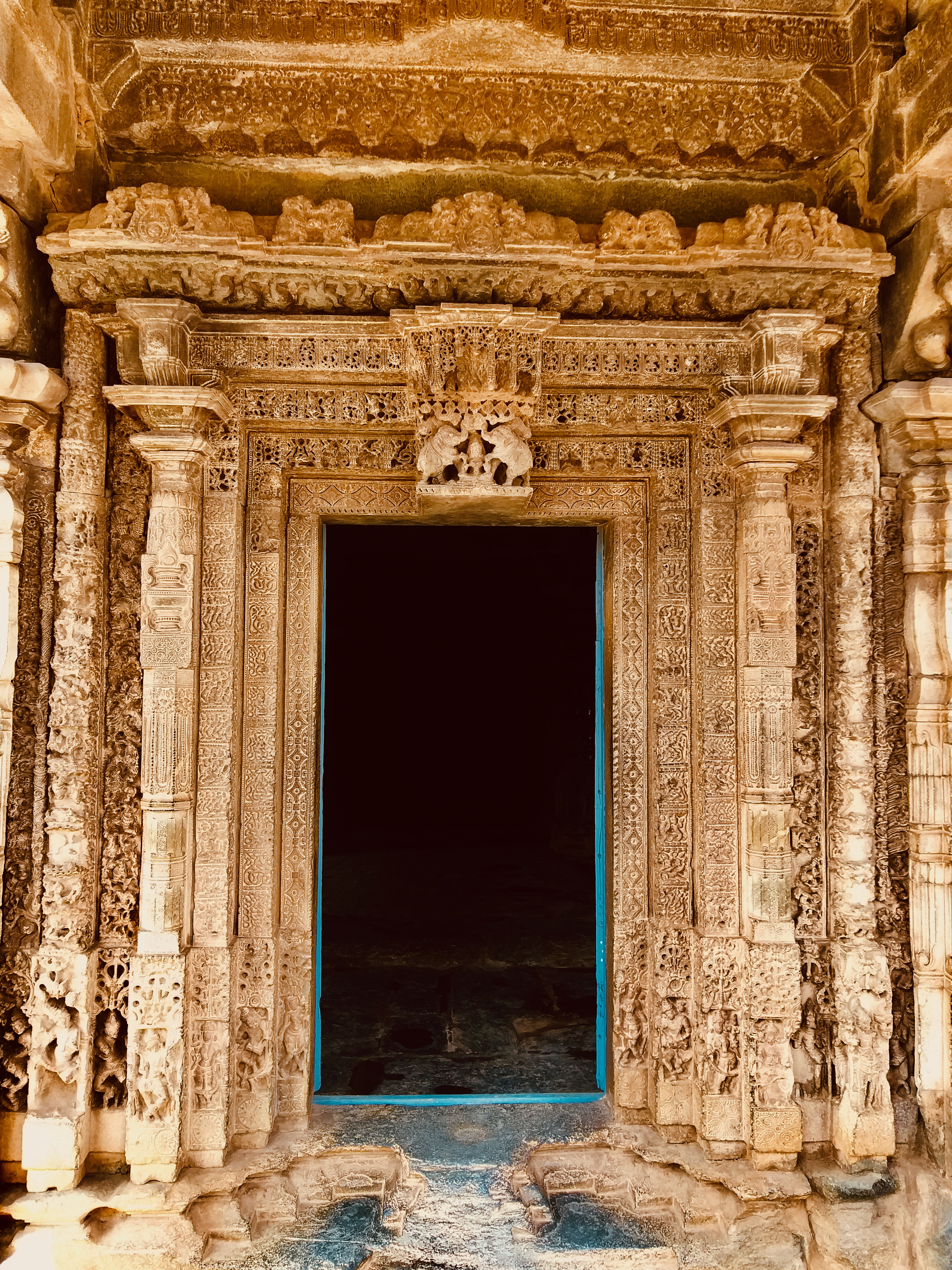
The main Shiva shrine's garbhagudi (sanctum) door decoration

The sanctum doorway of the Shiva shrine is flanked by two Brahmakanta pilasters, both richly carved. In addition are elaborately carved parallel sakhas, but instead of artha scenes of people, they show dancing and cheerful apsaras and godlings. Other layers show nature (flowering creepers, birds, peacocks, elephants), mithuna (amorous couples cuddling up, love scenes), and padma mala. There is the Gaja-lakshmi block, along with panels of Shaiva sages. The largest three panels show Brahma, Vishnu and Shiva, with Shiva taking the center stage. The sanctum doorway of the Surya shrine is similar, richly carved but a bit smaller, with different details and abbreviated. The panel above the sanctum door shows Surya riding a chariot of seven horses with miniature Aruna managing them. Flanking them are miniature Usha and Chayya goddesses. The symmetry and proportions make the Surya temple appear "handsomer" than the main shrine, states Dhaky.

Inside the Shiva shrine is a three foot linga, while the idol inside the Surya shrine has long been lost and is empty.

=== Decorative features ===
According to Cousens, the doorpost mouldings on the southern and eastern doorway are worthy of mention. On both sides of the southern doorway are four inner bands of scrolls which run up the sides and around the lower part of the entablature above. Next to these bands, on either side, in the centre, are tall columns or pilasters supporting the lower cornice above. Beyond these columns, on either side, are four more bands of decorative mouldings. Above the lower cornice, the entablature consists of small figures, now numbering only three (must have been eleven originally) standing under cusped arches. Above these figures is a valance of beads hanging in festoons. Above the cornice is a procession of men and animals. These images include horsemen and musicians.

The ornamentation on the outer wall of the shrine consists of prominent central niches above which is a miniature tower (shikhara or aedicule) which is purely nagara (north Indian) in style and cuts through the principal cornice. The decorative arch above the miniature tower is a conspicuous ornamental feature of the superstructure. The miniature tower arch combination is repeated up the superstructure of the shrine. The finial (kalasha) and the capping structure of the tower is missing. In the temple hall, decorations are found on the pillars, their capital, and brackets figures above the capital.

== Reception ==
The Kasivisvesvara temple highlights the innovative hallmarks and achievements of the Lakkundi school shilpins and sthapatis (artisans and architects) who explored the possibilities with soapstone, in contrast to the Sudi school which stayed with sandstone and focussed on its possibilities. This Lakkundi innovation was adopted by the Hoysala artisans, who built numerous temple groups on southern Karnataka. These schools were in the centre of cultural and temple-building activity of the Western Chalukya Empire near the Tungabhadra River region, where they built numerous monuments. Lakkundi in particular was the location of the mature phase of the Western Chalukya architecture, and the Kasivisvesvara temple marks a high point of these achievements. According to Henry Cousens, it is one of the most ornate temples in the Kannada spoken region of India.

According to Cousens, the Kasivisvesvara temple epitomises the shift in Chalukyan artistic achievements, towards sharper and crisper stone work not seen in earlier constructions, taking full advantage of the effect of light and shade. Special attention was paid to mouldings, arches and other details on the tower, and decorations on doorjambs and lintels.

The Kasivisvesvara temple is a "landmark in the history of medieval architecture of Karnatadesa", states Dhaky. According to Adam Hardy, "of the many temples at Lakkundi, the richest and most extraordinary is the Kasivisvesvara".

== Gallery ==
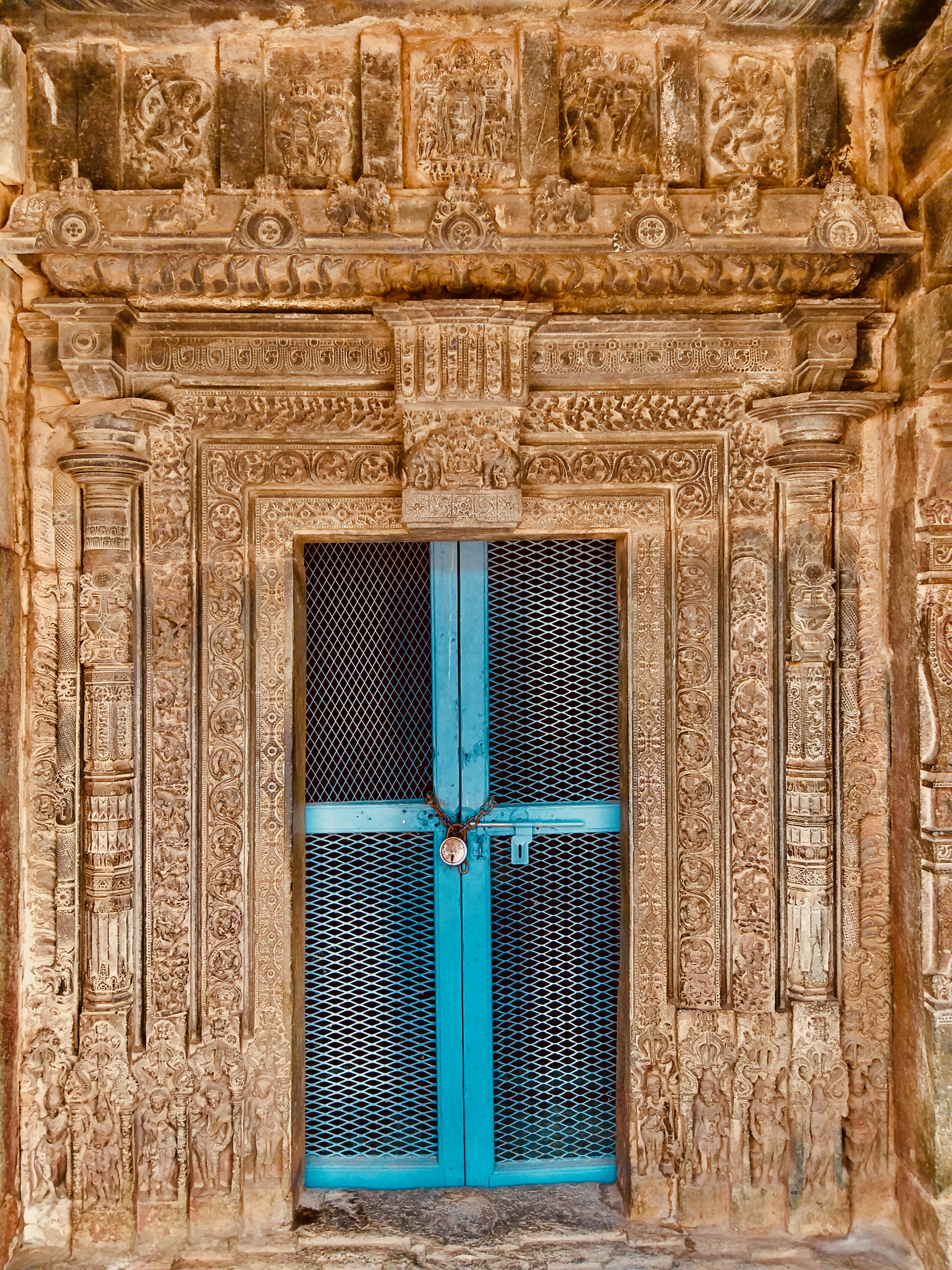
The intricately carved, panchasakha sanctum door of the Surya shrine; the lalita-bimba shows Surya

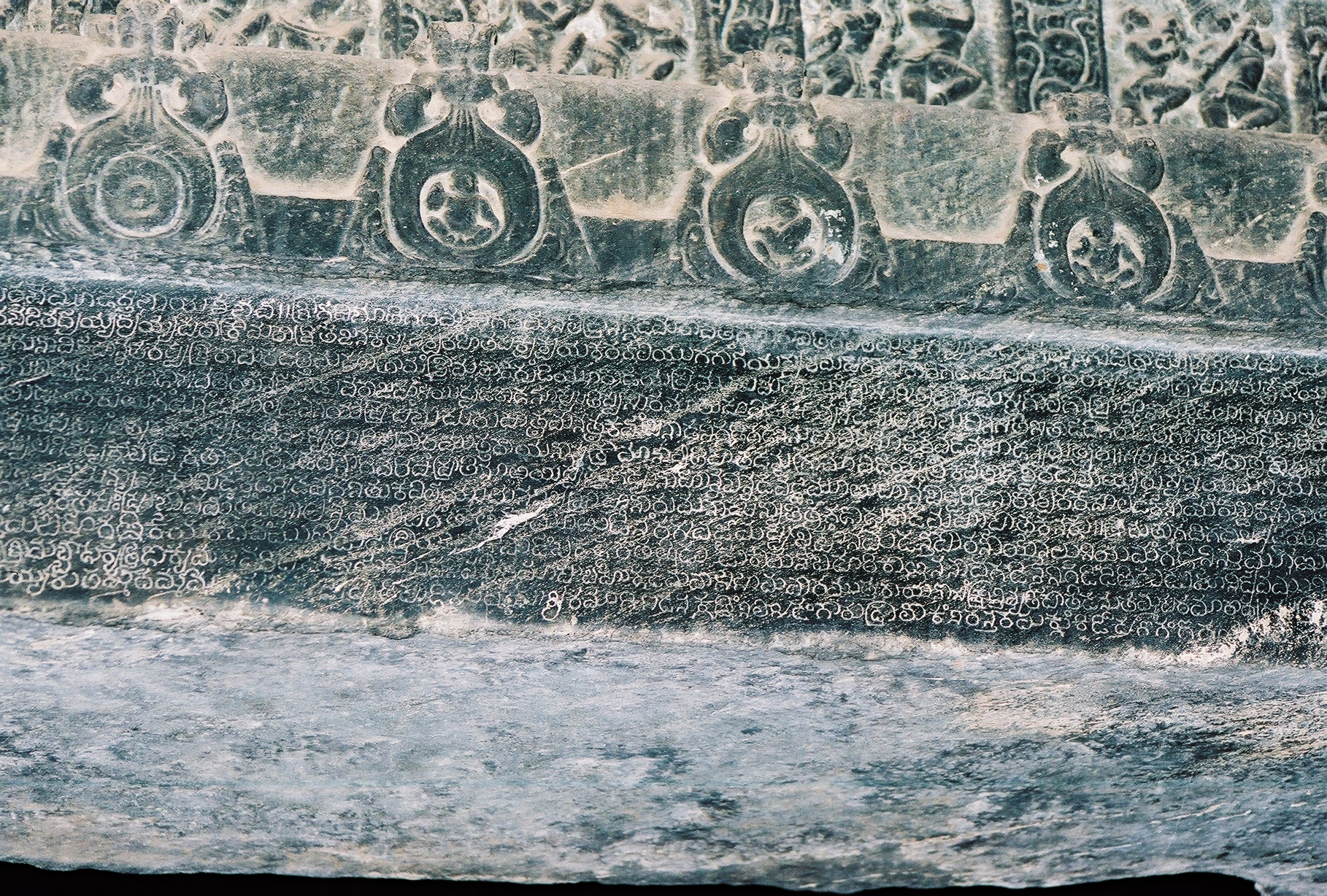
Old Kannada inscription of Vikramaditya VI dated 1087 A.D on temple beam

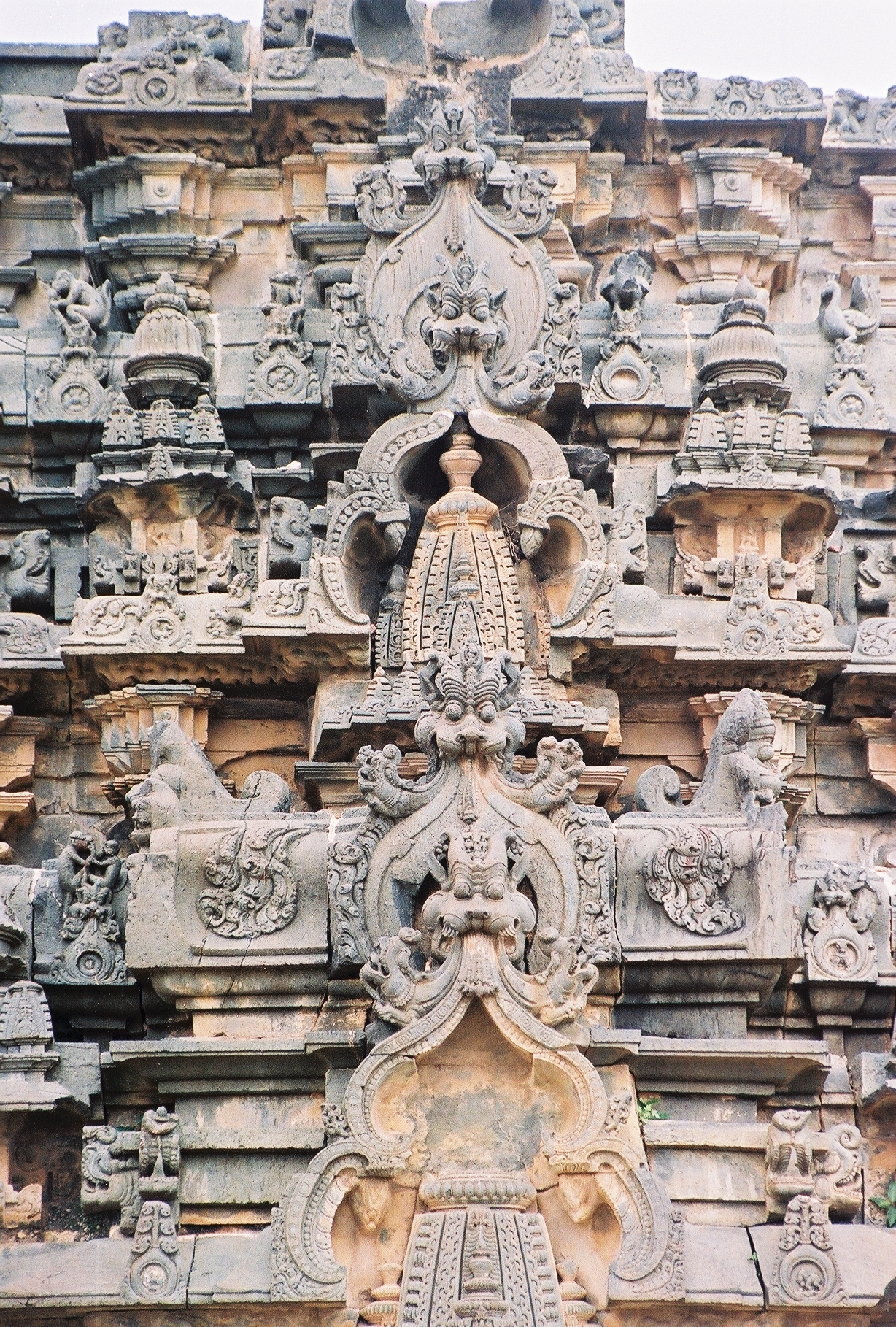
Kirtimukha (demon face) with miniature tower decorative arch combination going up the shrine superstructure

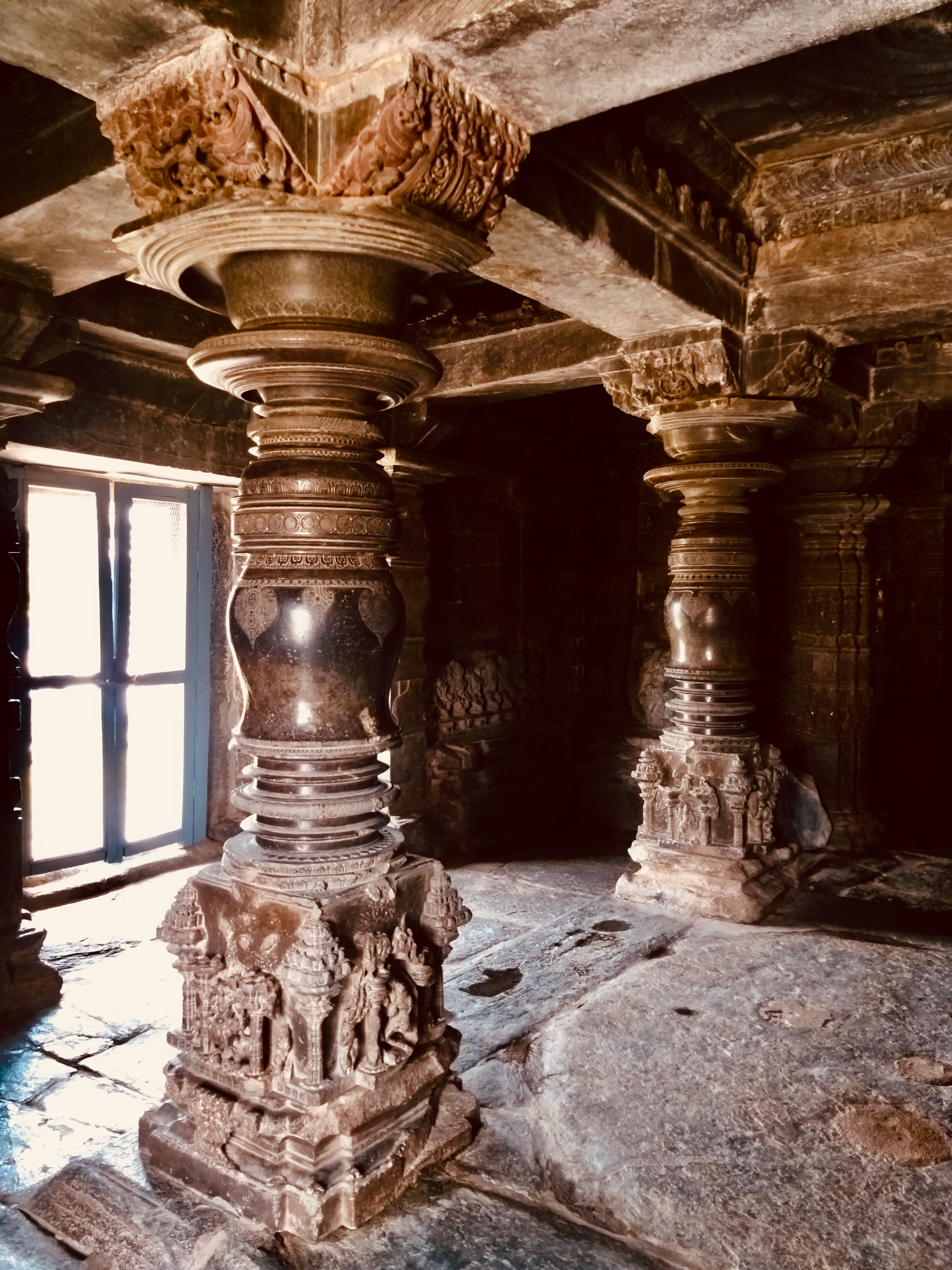
Pillars in the mandapa

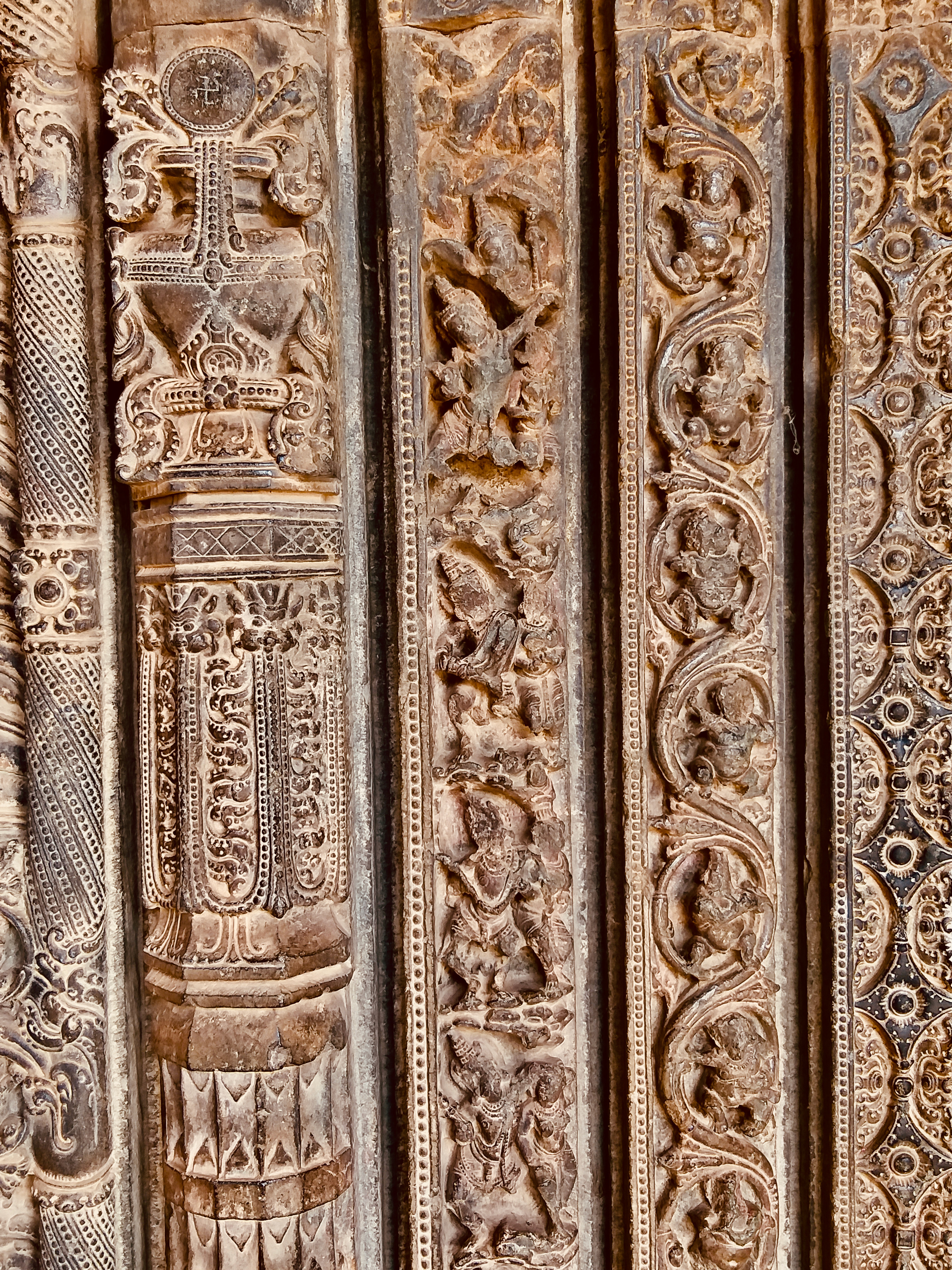
Miniature iconography and fine details

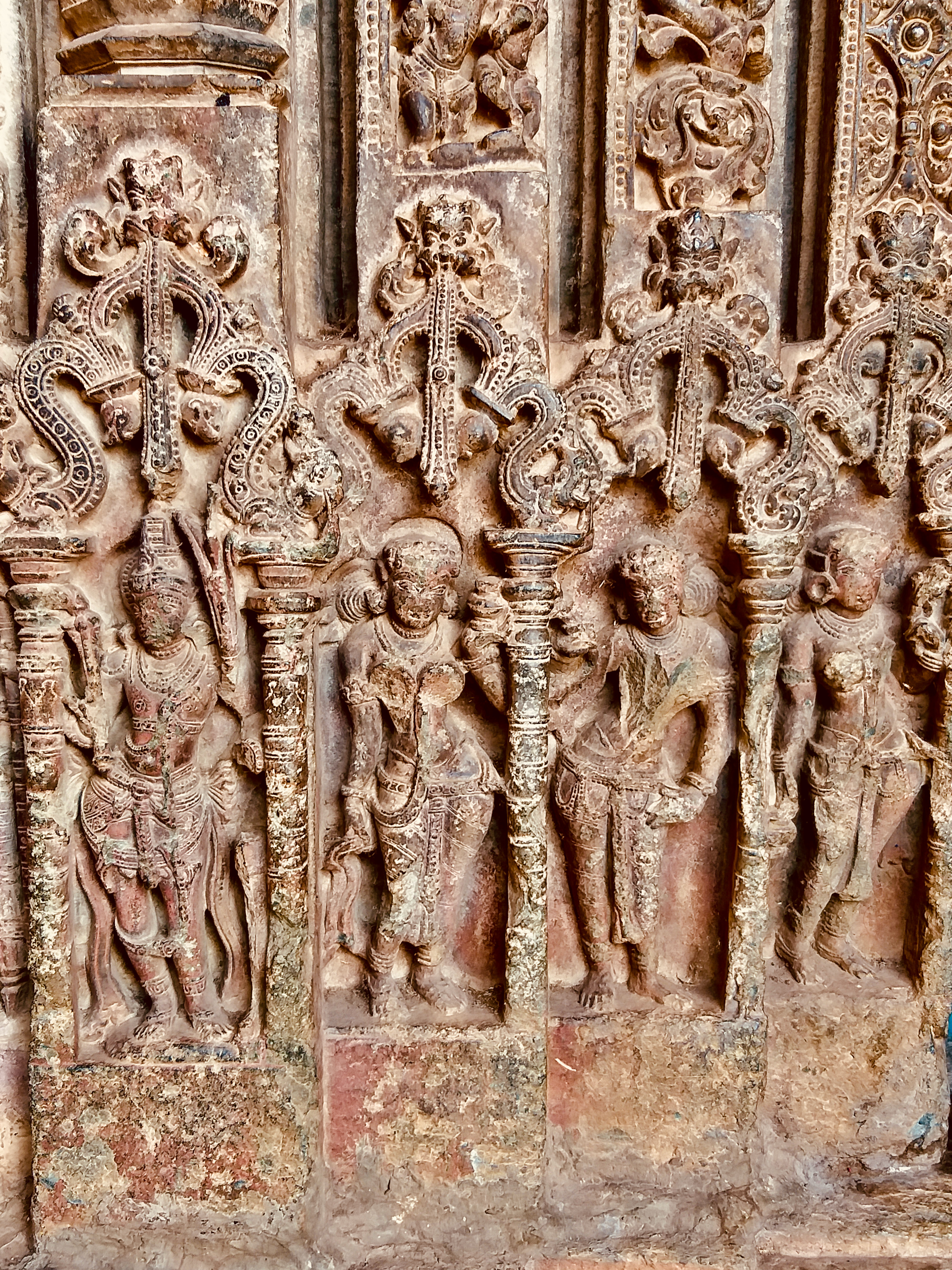
Artwork near the door

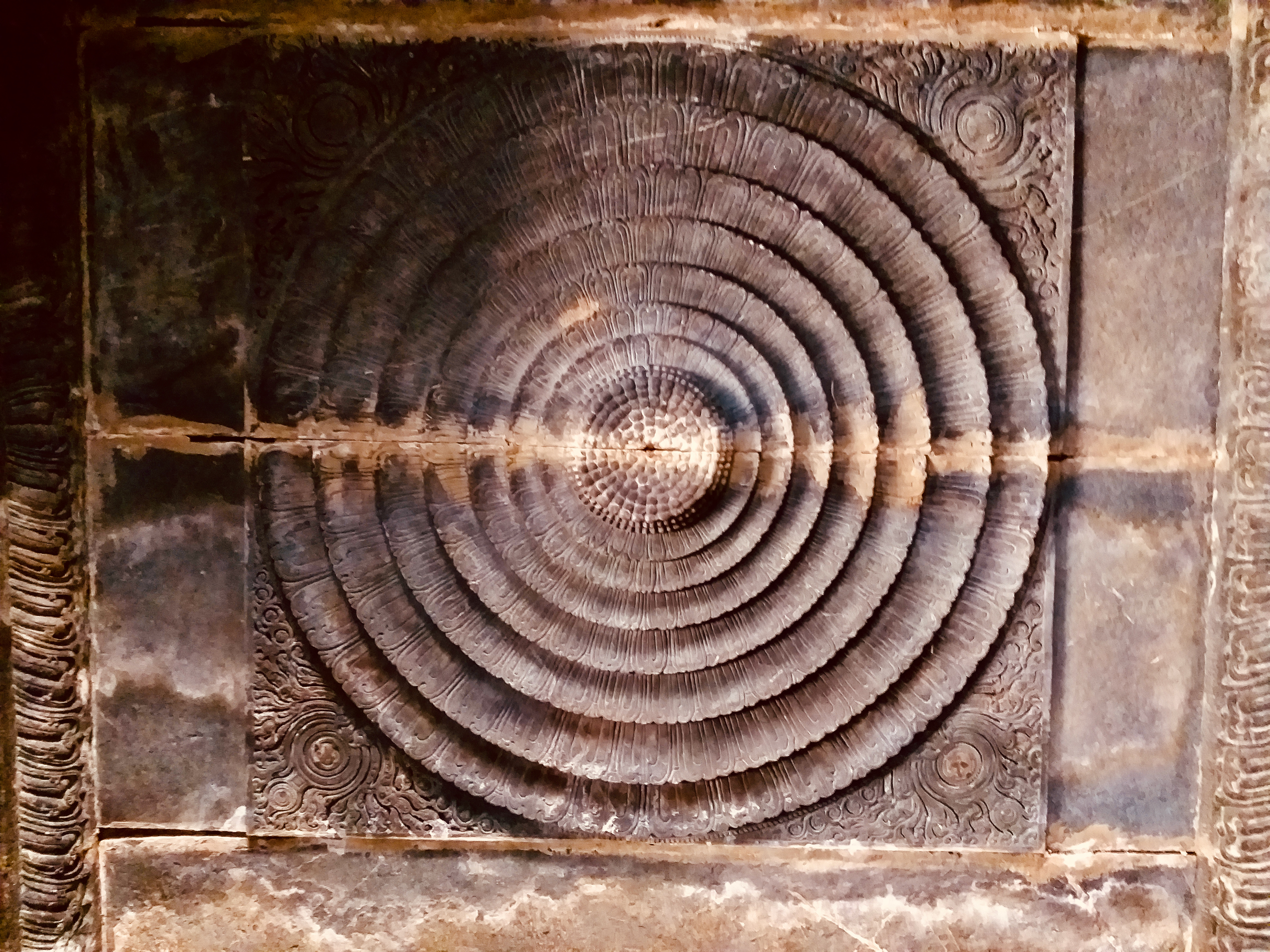
One of the ceiling carvings

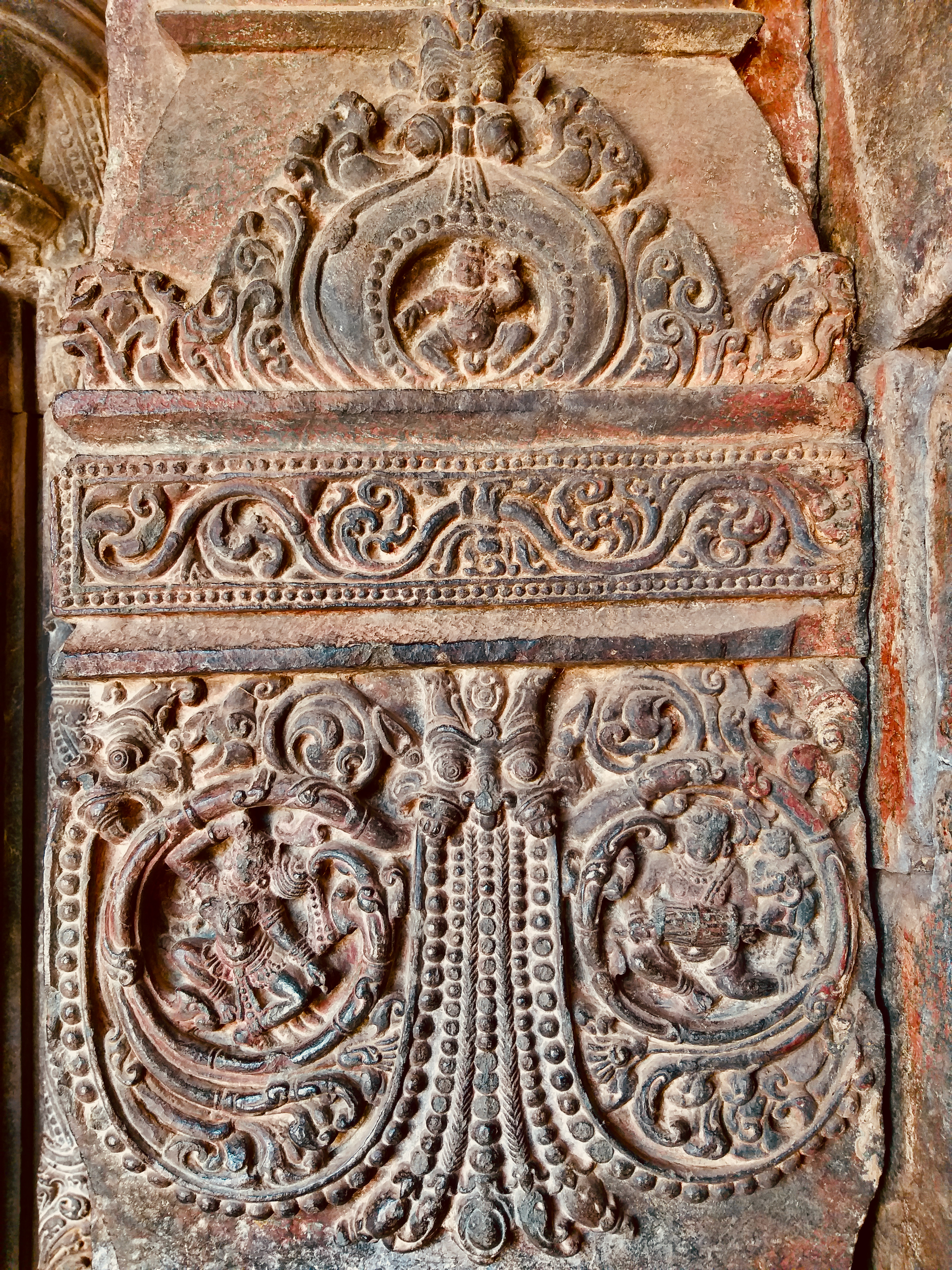
Musicians and dancers, latter illustrating classical Indian natya (dance) mudras

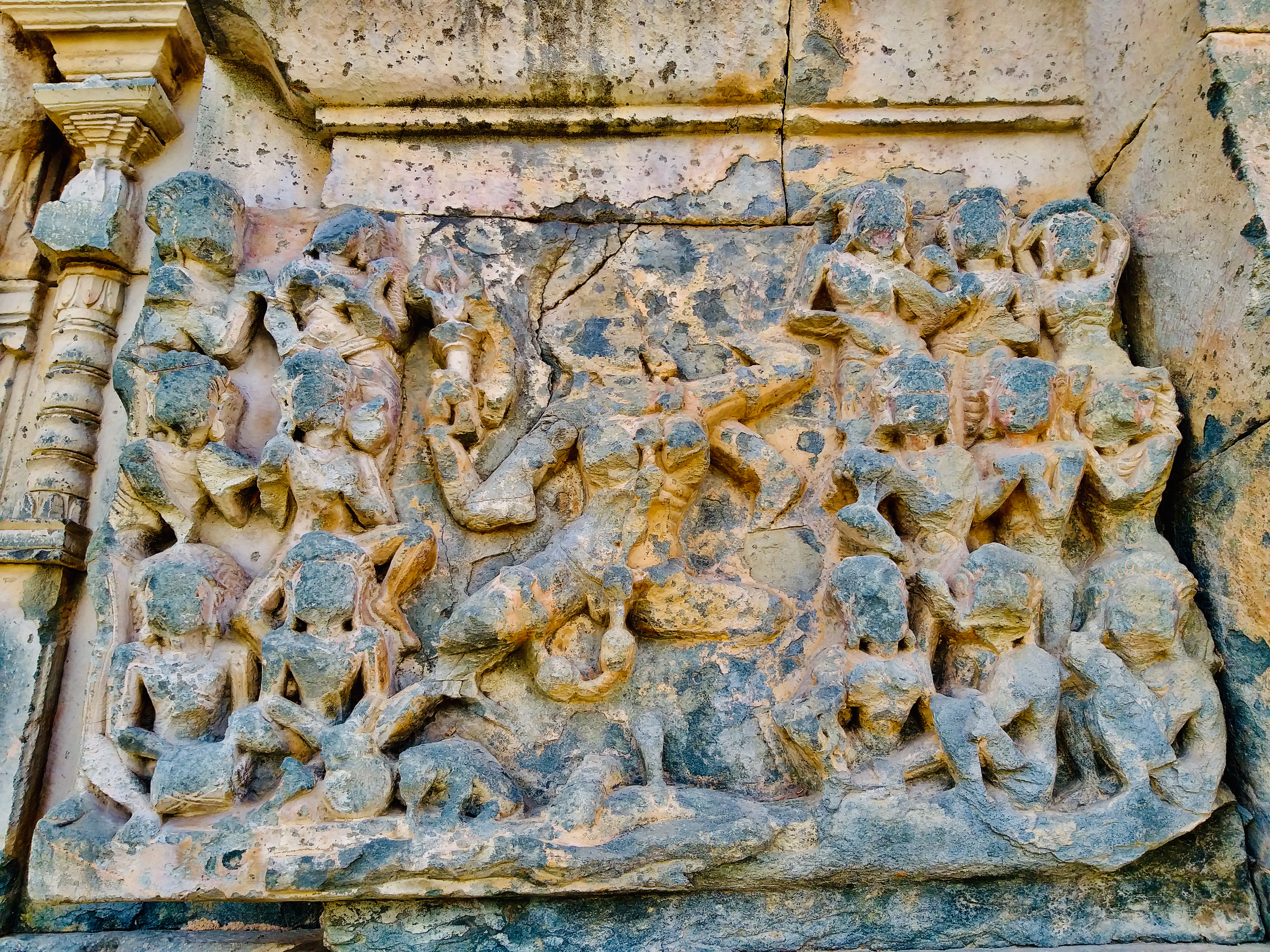
Panels show Ramayana and Mahabharata scenes, but much has been mutilated and defaced
