= Lakkundi =

Village in Karnataka, India

Lakkundi Lokkigundi
- Village
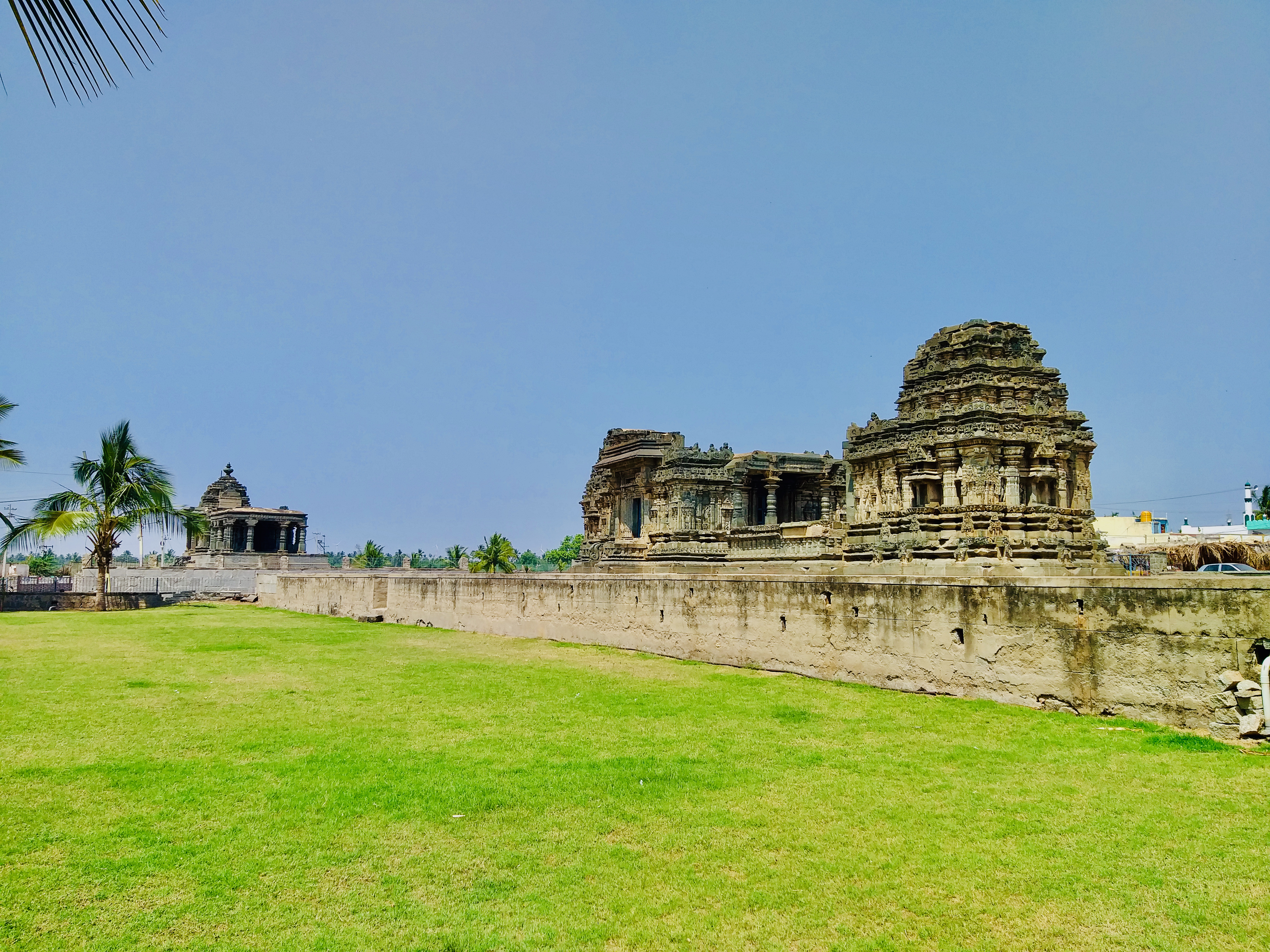
- Historic temples at Lakkundi

- Location in Karnataka, India Lakkundi (India)
- Coordinates: 15°23′23″N 75°43′06″E
- Country: India
- State: Karnataka
- District: Gadag

Languages
  - Official: Kannada
- Time zone: UTC+5:30 (IST)
- Postal code: 582115
- ISO 3166 code: IN-KA
- Vehicle registration: KA-26
- Nearest city: Gadag

Lakkundi, also referred to as Lokkugundi, was a major city before the 14th century and is now a village in the Gadag District of Karnataka, India. By the 10th century, it was already a major economic and commercial centre, hosting mint operations for South India. It was mentioned in Kannada and Sanskrit inscriptions and texts. By the 12th century, many Hindu and Jain temples had been consecrated here, along with public infrastructure such as stepwells and water reservoirs. Among the major temples are the Brahma Jinalaya (the oldest), Mallikarjuna, Lakshminarayana, Manikeshwara, Naganatha, Kumbheshvara, Nanneshwara, Someshwara, Narayana, Nilakanteshwara, Kasivisesvara (the most sophisticated and ornate), Virabhadra, Virupaksha, and others. As its importance and wealth grew, Lakkundi became one of the capitals of the Hoysala Empire.

In the 14th century, the city was targeted by Islamic Sultanates as they sought to plunder and establish political dominance over the South Indian Hindu kingdoms. The village of Lakkundi contains over 50 temple ruins, many of which are in poor condition and inhabited by bats. However, the major temples have been restored and are now maintained by the Archaeological Survey of India (ASI). Lakkundi is an important centre for the study of Kalyana Chalukya era Hindu architecture, known as the "Lakkundi school" of architects and craftsmen.

British archaeologists of the 19th century played a significant role in rediscovering Lakkundi and its significance in Indian art history. The ruins of Lakkundi are now a highlight of Indian art history in museums, with some ruins displayed in a local sculpture gallery and sheds near the temples.

Aside from Hindu and Jain monuments, a Muslim dargah dedicated to Zindeshah Wali is also found in Lakkundi. The site attracts visitors from all over the world due to its rich historical and cultural heritage.

As of January 2026, excavation at the Kote Veerabhadraswamy Temple in Lakkundi has revealed Neolithic-era artefacts including a broken gray clay pot, cowrie shells, a stone axe, a cross-shaped pedestal, and a stone pedestal carved with a Jina figure, during an ASI-supervised dig that began on January 16 and involves 34 workers excavating up to five feet deep, while authorities are also engaging residents living on temple land to relocate for restoration, with families expressing willingness to move if provided alternative housing and land.

== Location ==
Core area of Western Chalukya architectural activity in modern Karnataka state, India

Lakkundi is about 12 kilometers from the twin city of Gadag-Betageri, between Hampi and Goa, connected by India's National Highway 67. Home to numerous ruins of historic Hindu and Jain temples, Lakkundi is located in a region with many major temple groups from the Kalachuris, Chalukyas, Yadavas-Seunas, Hoysalas, and Vijayanagara eras. For example, it is close to historic temples found in Dambal, Kukkanur, Gadag, Annigeri, Mulgund, Harti, Laksmesvara, Kalkeri, Savadi, Hooli, Rona, Sudi, Koppal, and Itagi. The nearest railway station is in Gadag city.

== History ==
Lakkundi is the phonetically shortened form of the historic name Lokkigundi, a name found in inscriptions in the village and others found in southern Karnataka and Maharashtra. The earliest surviving inscription was discovered by British archaeologists on a stone slab near Kanner Bhanvi—a stepwell in Lakkundi. The inscribed stone slab was being used by local dhobis (washermen) to wash clothes at the stepwell. The inscription on it dates to 790 CE. This inscription confirms that Lakkundi was already in existence and significant enough for an inscription by the 8th century. James Fergusson—the 19th-century Scottish historian known for his archaeological and architectural studies in India—reported over 30 more inscriptions from Lakkundi, in Kannada and Sanskrit, most of which range between the 11th and 12th centuries. Some of these were foundation inscriptions of Jain and Hindu temples; others were gifts to different temples, to Maha-agrahara, to monasteries such as Hiree Matha (now lost), to donate stepwells for the public and pilgrims, and for other purposes. Though damaged, many of them include the Saka year of the inscription. The profusion of these inscriptions attests to the importance of Lakkundi as a historic city to both Hindu and Jain traditions.

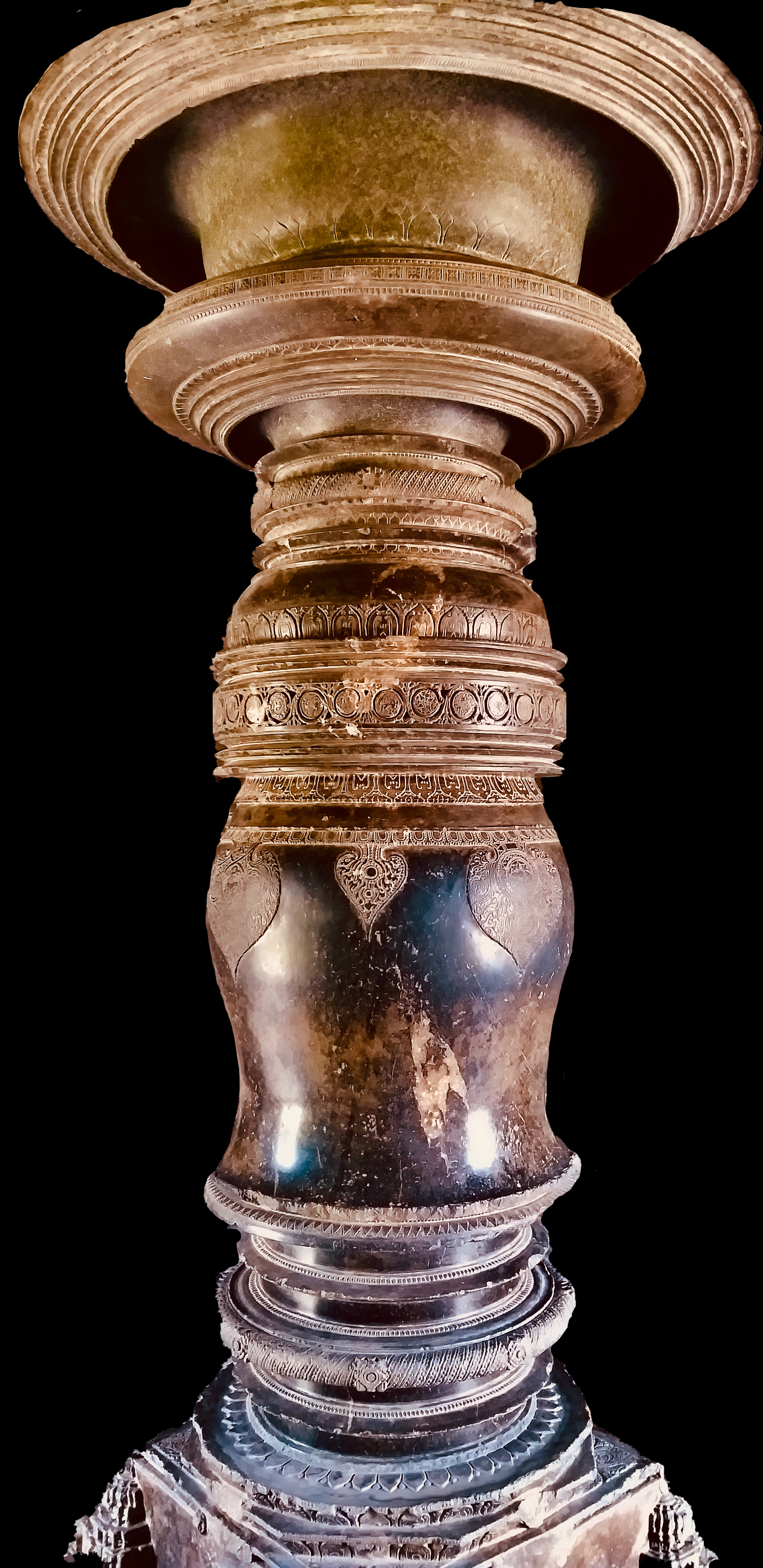
A decorated pillar at the Kasivisvesvara temple, Lakkundi

Many more inscriptions on stone and copper plates mentioning Lokkugundi have been discovered far from Lakkundi. However, in this part of ancient and medieval Karnataka, Lokkugundi is among the most mentioned cities. By 1884, some 35 Hindu and Jain inscriptions dated to between the 9th and 13th centuries CE had been found that mention Lokkugundi. Though Lakkundi was an established town in the second half of the 1st millennium, its growth and wealth came after 973 CE when Taila II, a Chalukya of Vatapi descendant and chieftain appointed in 965 CE, organized a successful revolt against Karkka II of the Rashtrakuta dynasty. In regional texts, the reign that followed is called Cālukya (Later Chalukyas, Kalyani Chalukyas, or Chalukyas of Kalyana) to distinguish them from the Calukya (Early Chalukyas). Lakkundi flowered and grew with the Shaiva-tradition Hindu monarch Satyasraya Irivabedanga—the successor and son of Taila II who came to power in 997 or 998 CE. This is attested by both Jain and Hindu inscriptions of the early 11th century, particularly of a woman named Attimabbe who obtained permission from Satyasraya to build her Jaina temple; the result is the oldest surviving Brahma Jinalaya temple in Lakkundi.

Lakkundi grew to be a major city, prosperous and one with a mint. Lakkundi and several historic towns to its north—such as Rona, Sudi, Kradugu (now known as Gadag), Hooli and others—attracted a burst of religious, cultural, and literary flowering from the 11th to 13th centuries, with ever more sophisticated temple architecture, Vidyadana (charity-supported schools), and public works such as stepwells. These are largely in the context of Shaivism and Jainism, though a few major temples of Vaishnavism here are also from this period.

Smaller Lakkundi monuments can be traced to the Kalachuris, the short rule here of the Seunas, and the longer rule of the Hoysalas. In 1192 CE, after many of the remarkable temples of Lakkundi were already standing, a Sanskrit inscription of the Hoysala king Ballala II re-affirms the continued importance of Lakkundi and it becoming his capital. After the 13th century, there is an abrupt end to all evidence of new public works, temples, inscriptions, and other indirect signs of economic prosperity in Lakkundi.

=== Temples ===
Lakkundi has about 50 temples and temple ruins of different sizes and sophistication, all dated to pre-14th century. They are of Shaivism, Jainism, and Vaishnavism, though most temples include diverse iconography such as Surya and Vedic deities such as Brahma. For example, the oldest Jaina temple—Brahma Jinalaya—includes Hindu statues and artworks such as that of the four-headed Brahma, Saraswati, and Lakshmi, along with Mahavira, Parsvanatha, and other Tirthankaras. The major surviving temples in Lakkundi include:

Lakkundi temples
Temple	Year/century	Image	Deity	Notes
Brahma Jinalaya	1007 CE		Neminatha	The largest Jain temple in Lakkundi and the oldest of the large temples (1007 CE).
Naganatha Temple, Lakkundi	Early 11th century		Parsvanatha	Another Jain temple, dedicated to Parsvanatha and Naga (serpent deity).
Kasivisvesvara Temple, Lakkundi	1030 CE		Shiva and Surya	Also known as the Kavatalesvara temple in historic texts, it is a Hindu twin temple—one for Shiva and the other for Surya. It is highly ornate and the most sophisticated among the Lakkundi temples. According to Burgess, it has "one of the finest surviving illustration[s] of Hindu decorative artwork in India". It is one of the best illustrations of the Kalyana Chalukya style of Hindu architecture.
Malikarjuna Temple, Lakkundi	11th century		Shiva	
Halagund Basavanna Temple, Lakkundi			Shiva	
Virupaksha Temple, Lakkundi	1010 CE		Shiva	An active and most-attended village temple, featuring Rashtrakuta-style Hindu architecture.
Lakshminarayana Temple, Lakkundi	11th century		Vishnu	
Manikesvar Temple, Lakkundi	1160 CE		Shiva	A trikuta temple with one of the many historic stepwells in Lakkundi.
Virabhadra Temple, Lakkundi	11th century		Virabhadra	
Nanesvara Temple, Lakkundi	1020–30 CE		Shiva	A Hindu temple with innovations in mandapa and pillar architecture, one of the earliest examples of the fully developed Kalyana Chalukya style.
Somesvara Temple, Lakkundi	11th-century		Shiva	A Shiva temple closer to the historic fort walls; parts of the temple have influences from the Sudi–Aihole school of Hindu architecture.
Nilakanthesvara Temple, Lakkundi	11th century		Shiva	A Shiva temple with notable artwork on the outer walls.
Kumbheshvara Temple, Lakkundi	Late 11th or early 12th century		Shiva	Another trikuta Hindu temple with one section better preserved, now surrounded by private homes; the symmetric gudhamandapa is brilliantly structured and constructed.
Other Hindu and Jaina temple ruins	8th to 13th century			The Siddharamesvara temple, for example, is a small Karnata-Chalukya style temple from the early 11th century.

=== Stepwells ===
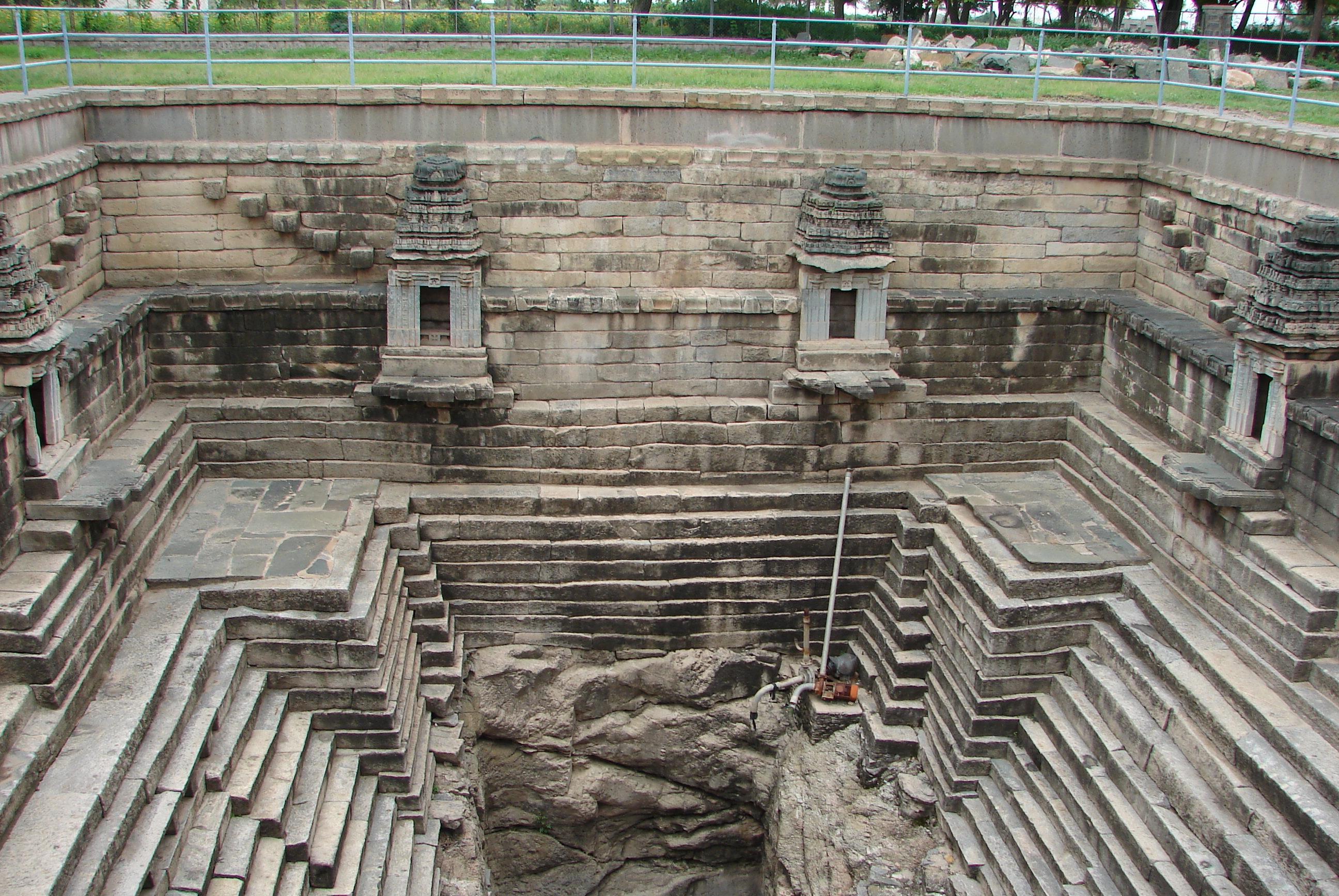
Stepwell near the Manikesvara Temple in Lakkundi

Lakkundi has many stepwells (101 of them to be exact), some functioning as water tanks for the temples. These are artistically built with small canopied niches enshrining lingas. The Chateer Bavi, Kanne Bavi, and Musukina Bavi are architecturally significant and popular for their artwork and carvings.

=== Inscriptions ===
Over two dozen Kannada and Sanskrit inscriptions from different Hindu dynasties have been found at Lakkundi. These describe gifts and donations, the names of donors and the social classes they came from, the ritual and cultural aspects of their times, and the socio-political context of medieval Karnataka. Some of these are important for establishing the history of Jain heritage in Karnataka during the rule of these dynasties. Key inscriptions include:

- The inscriptions of the Kalyani Chalukya king Satyasraya Irivabedanga (reigned 997–1008 CE), which narrate in the Ajithanatha Purana the details of the construction of the Brahma Jinalaya by Attimabbe and the associated donations.
- An inscription of the Kalachuri king Sovideva (1173 CE), which records the donation of gold to a Basadi by Gunanidi Keshava.
- Important inscriptions of the Kalyani Chalukya king Somashevara IV (1185 CE), which record a donation for conducting Ashtavidharchana. Another 12th-century inscription mentions the donation of land to Tribhuvana Tilaka Shantinatha. Another inscription mentions the existence of the Jain saint Mulasangha Devanga.

== Tourism ==
Lakkundi is a significant site for tourists interested in Chalukya-style temples, stepwells, and historic inscriptions. Although less visited than nearby Hampi, it contains some of the finest examples of architecture from the Kalyana Chalukya period (c. 10th century CE).

== Gallery ==
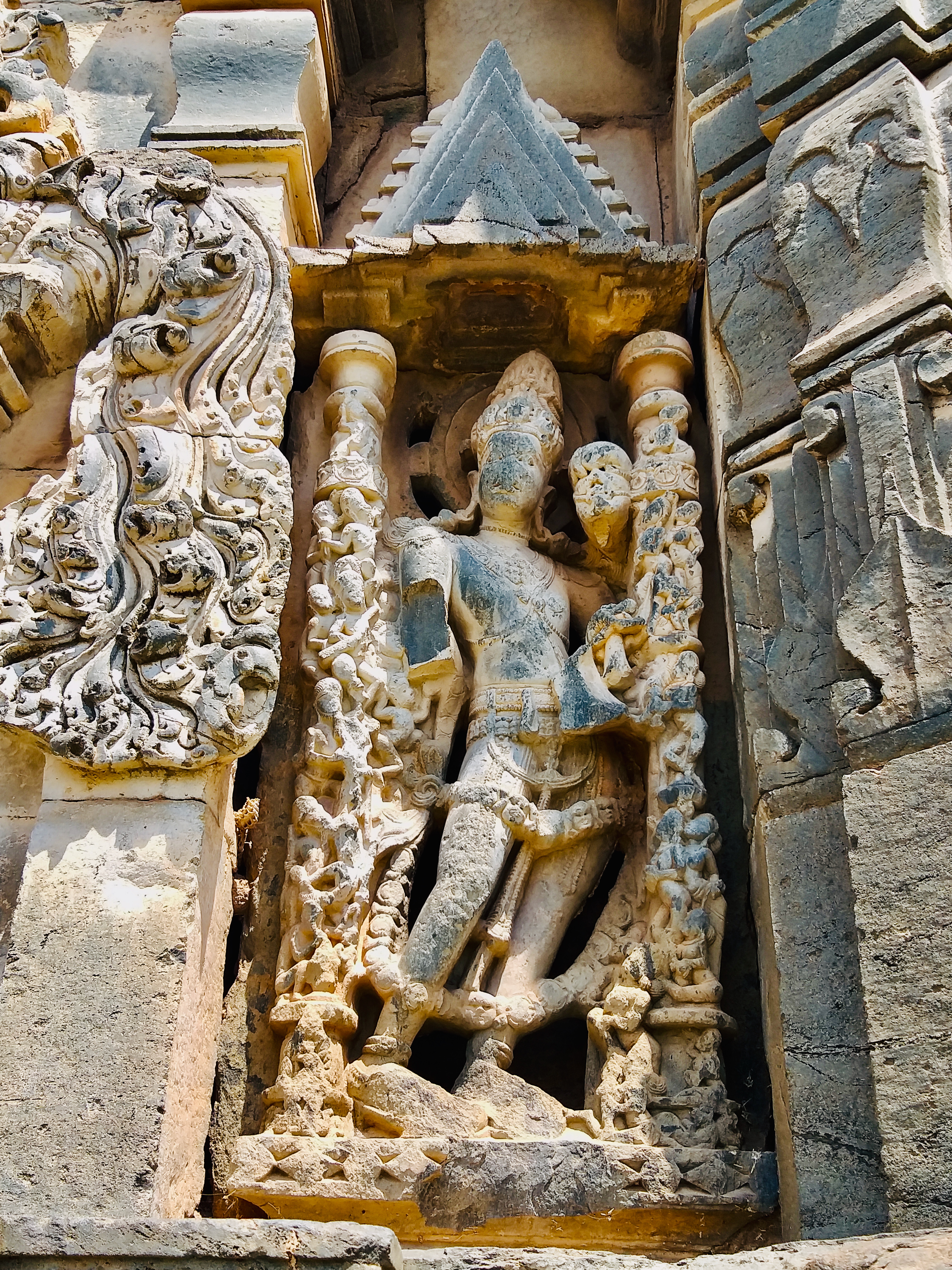
A relief on the outer wall, Kasivisvesvara Temple

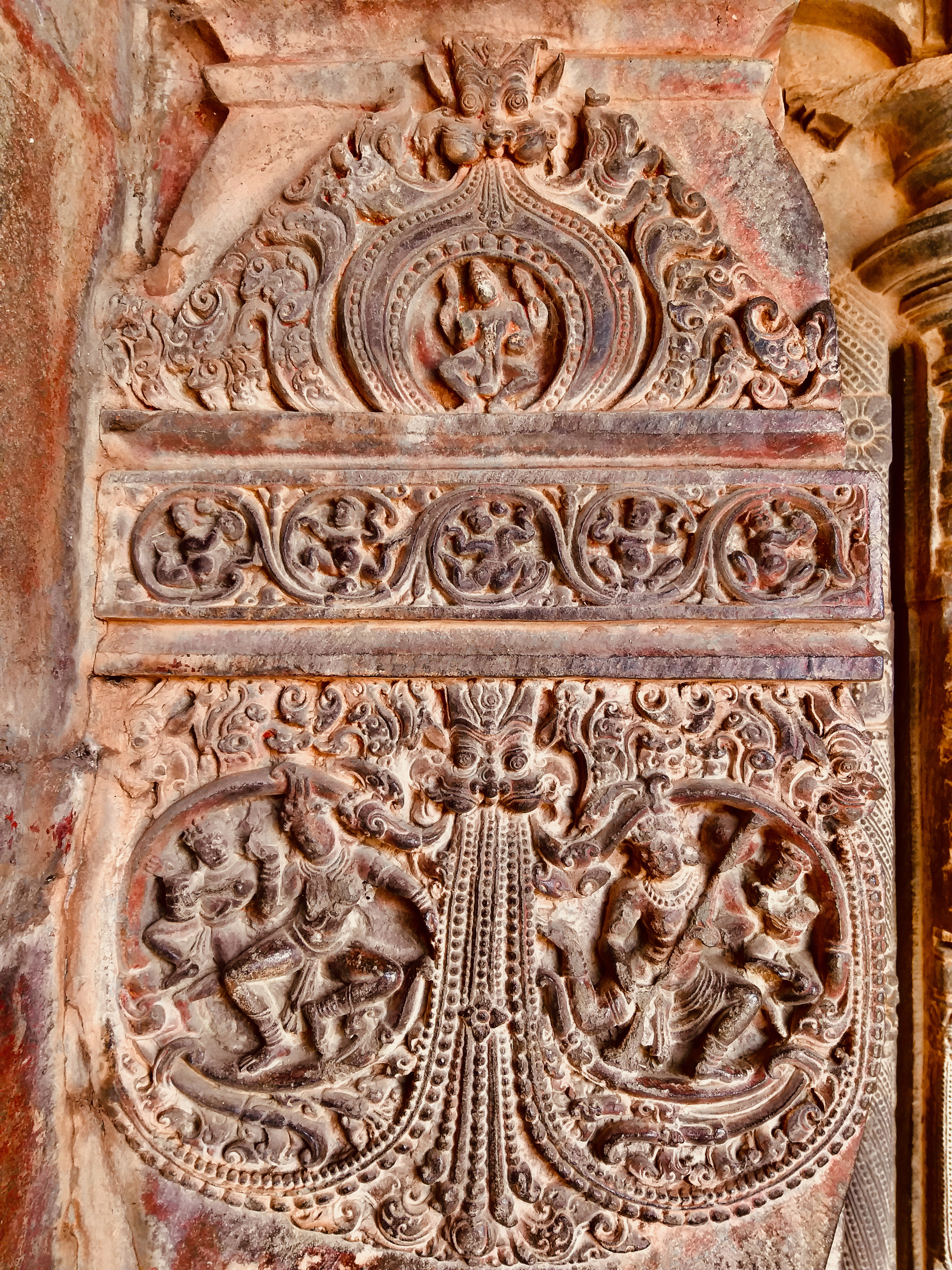
A relief on the inner wall, Kasivisvesvara Temple

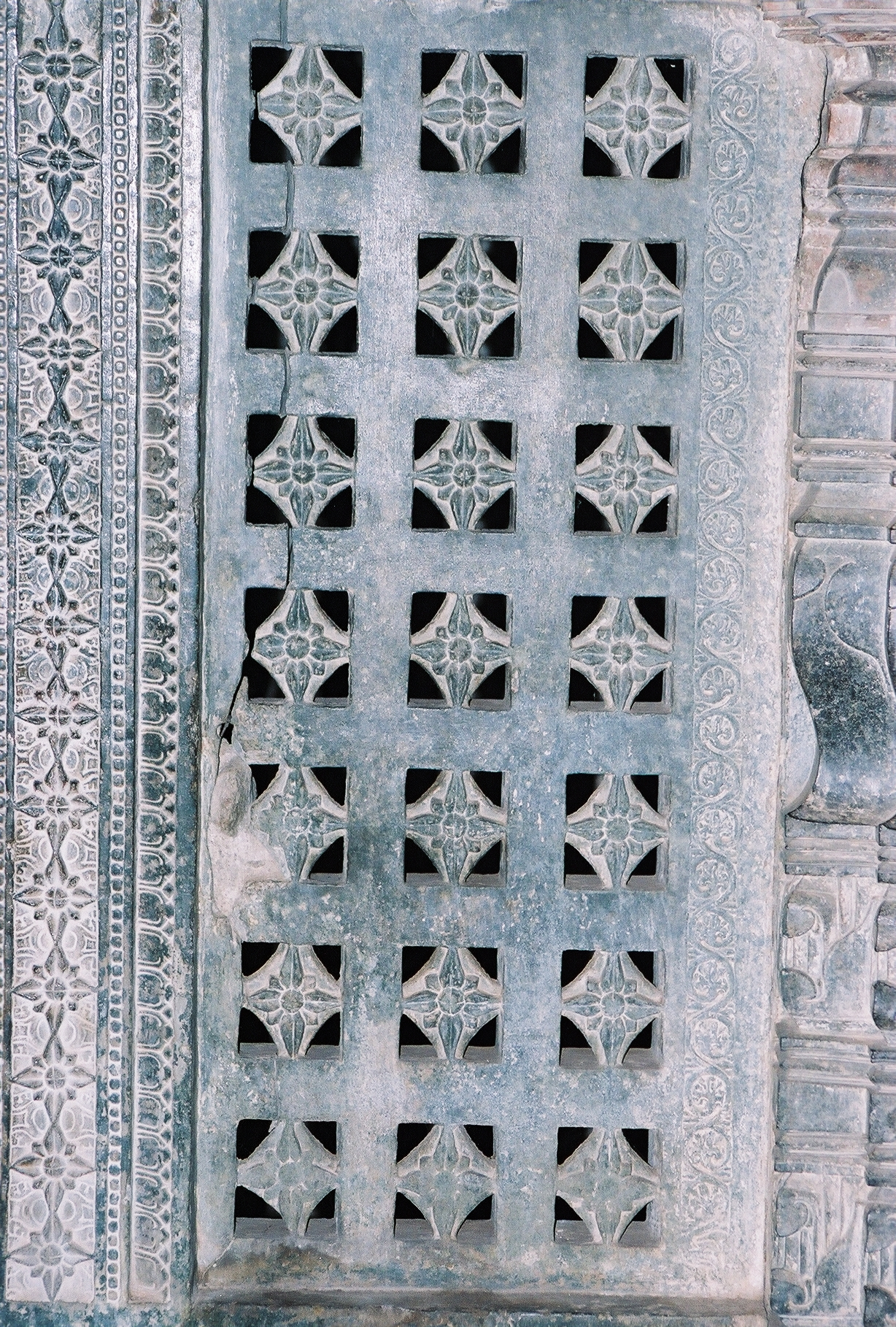
A pierced window screen brings light into the mantapa at Manikesvara Temple

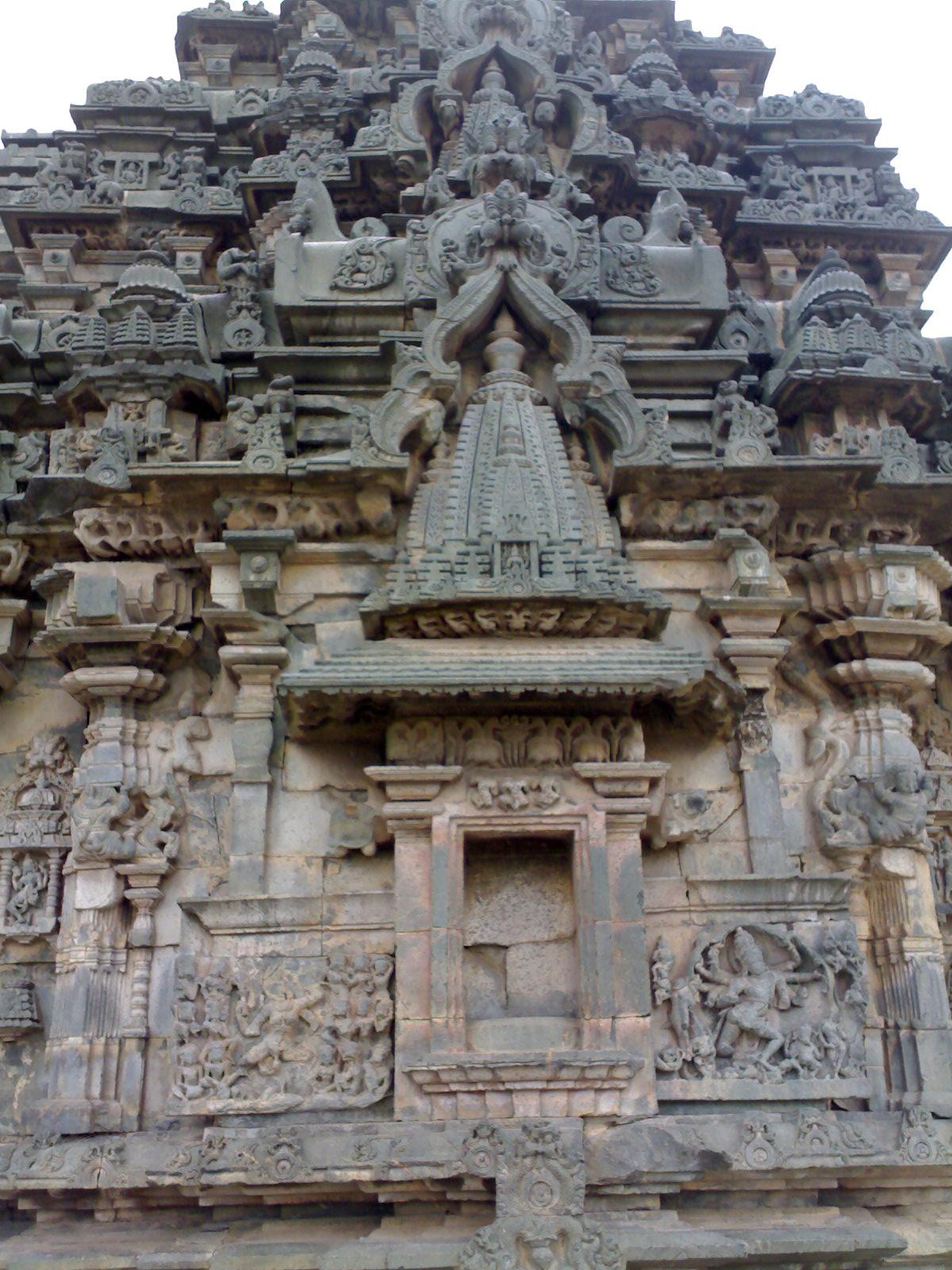
Nanneshwara Temple at Lakkundi

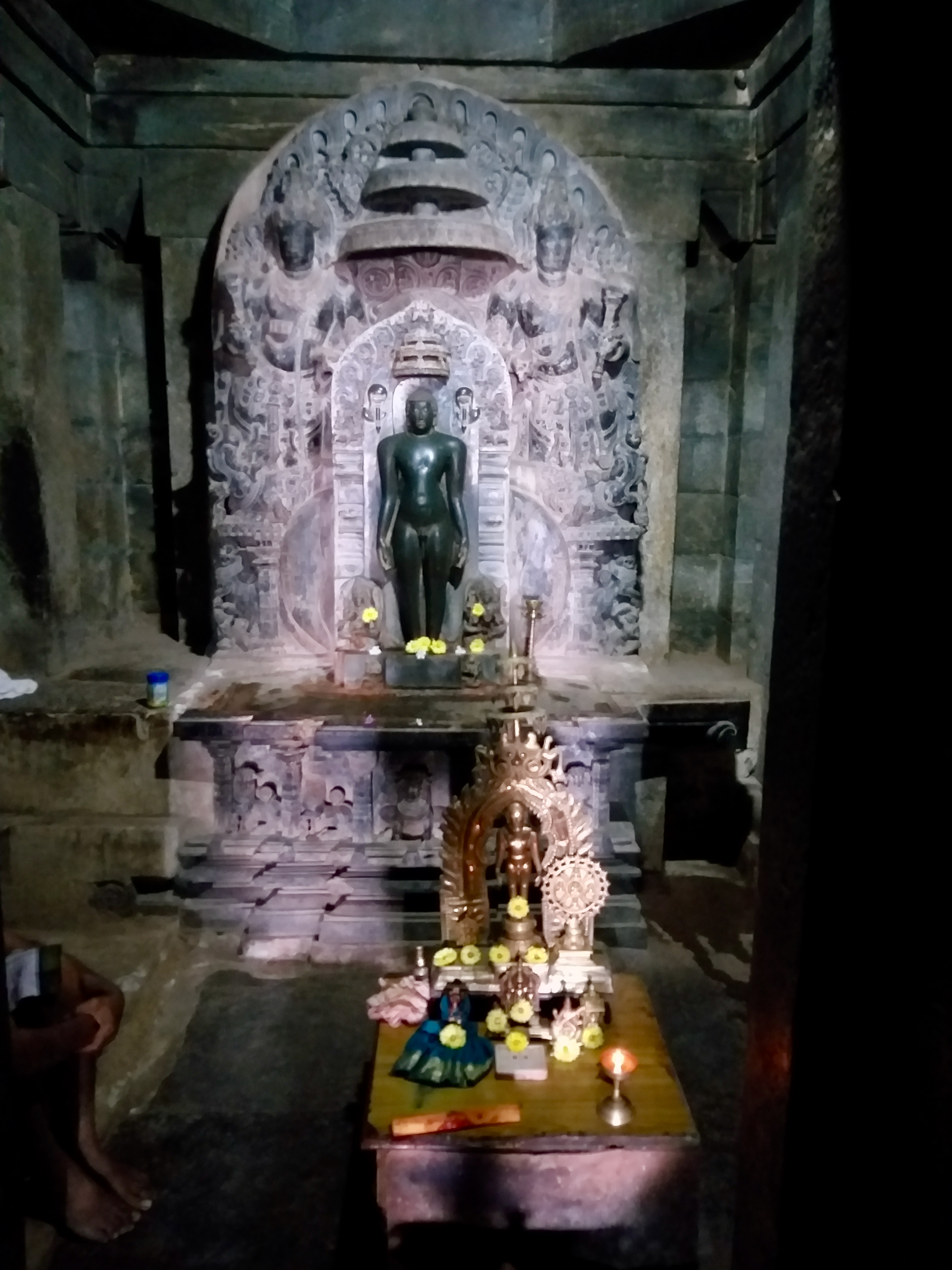
Tirthankara image in the sanctum

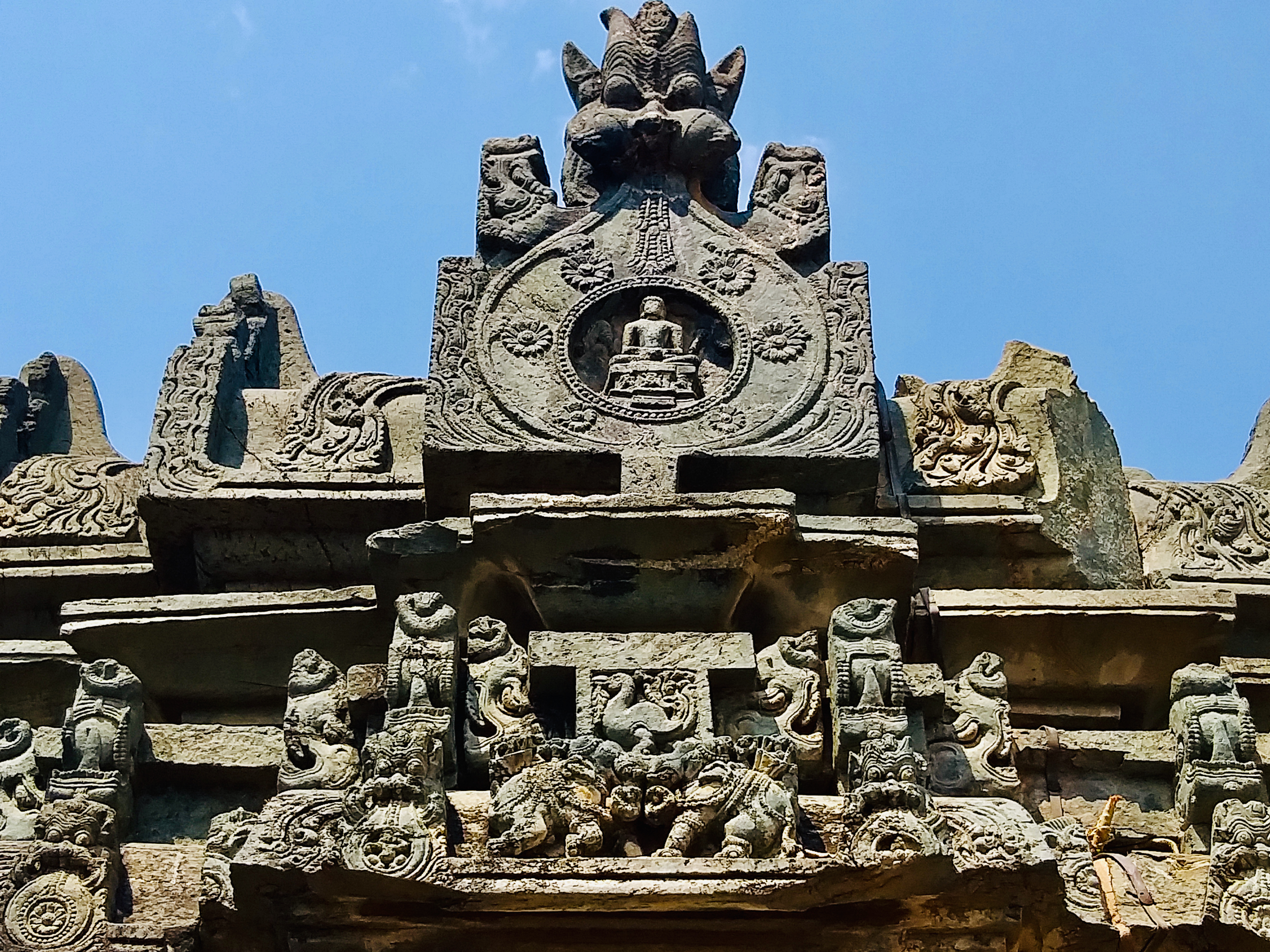
Tirthankara in the gavaska, Naganatha Jain temple

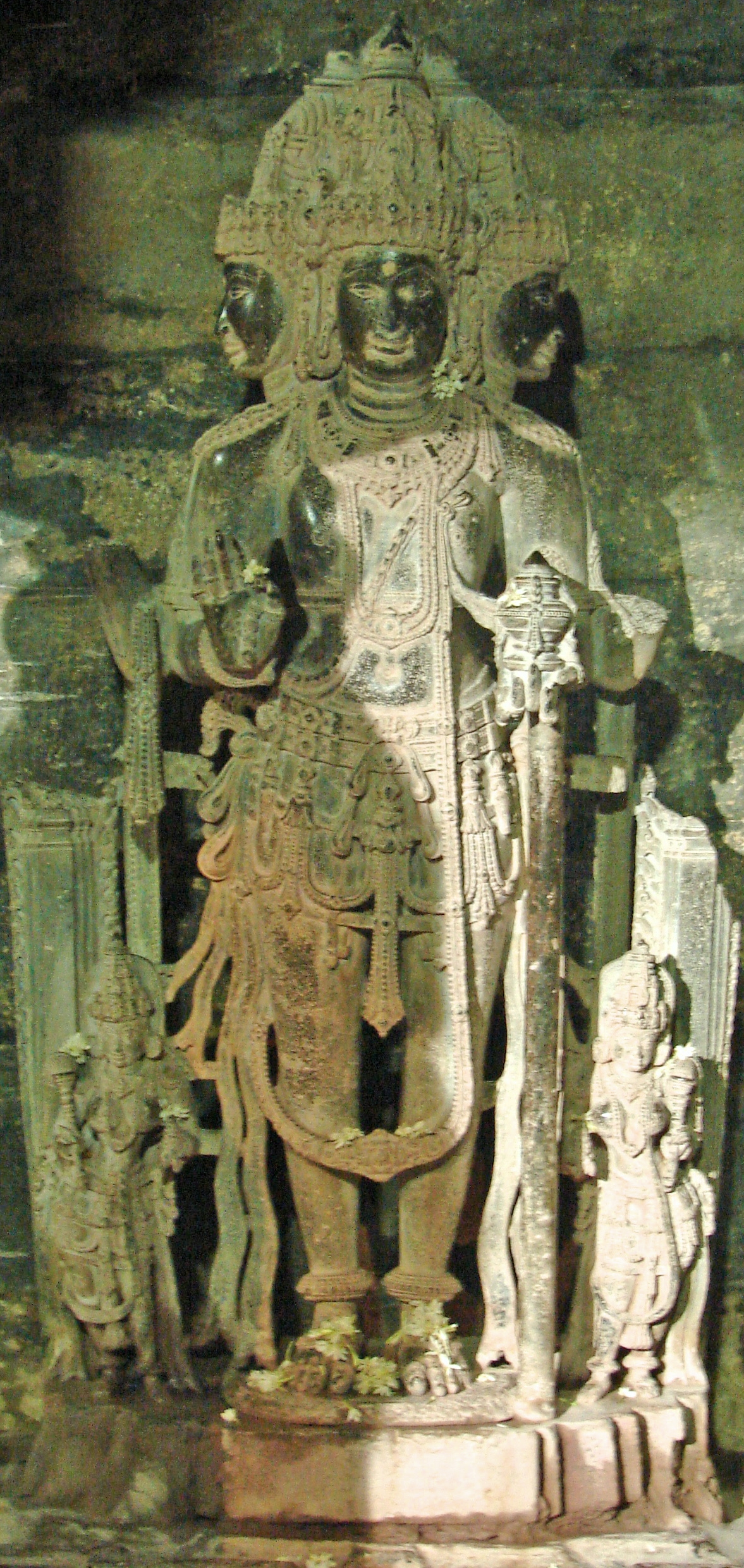
Chaturmukha Brahma image at Jain Temple

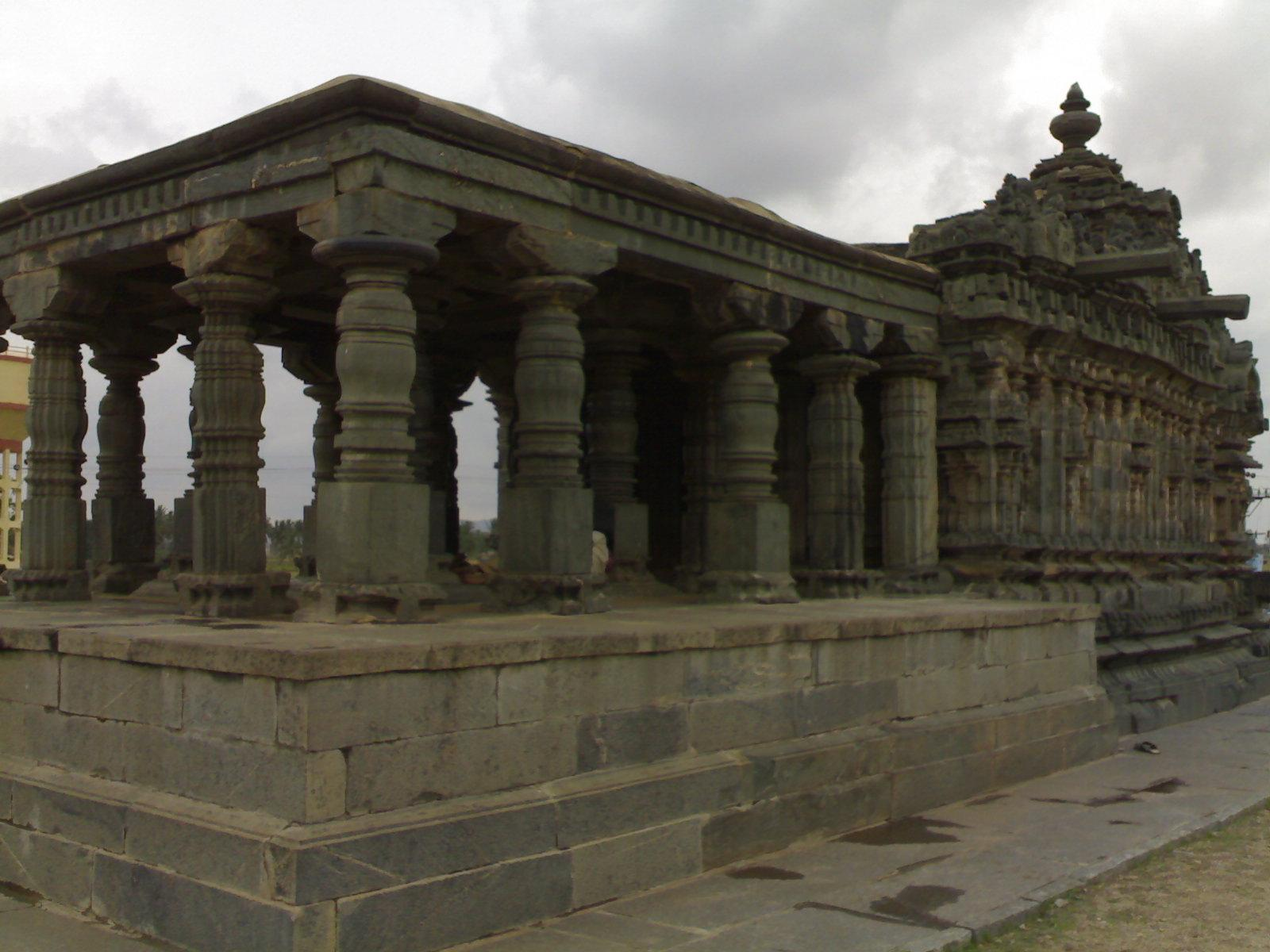
Nanneshwara Temple at Lakkundi

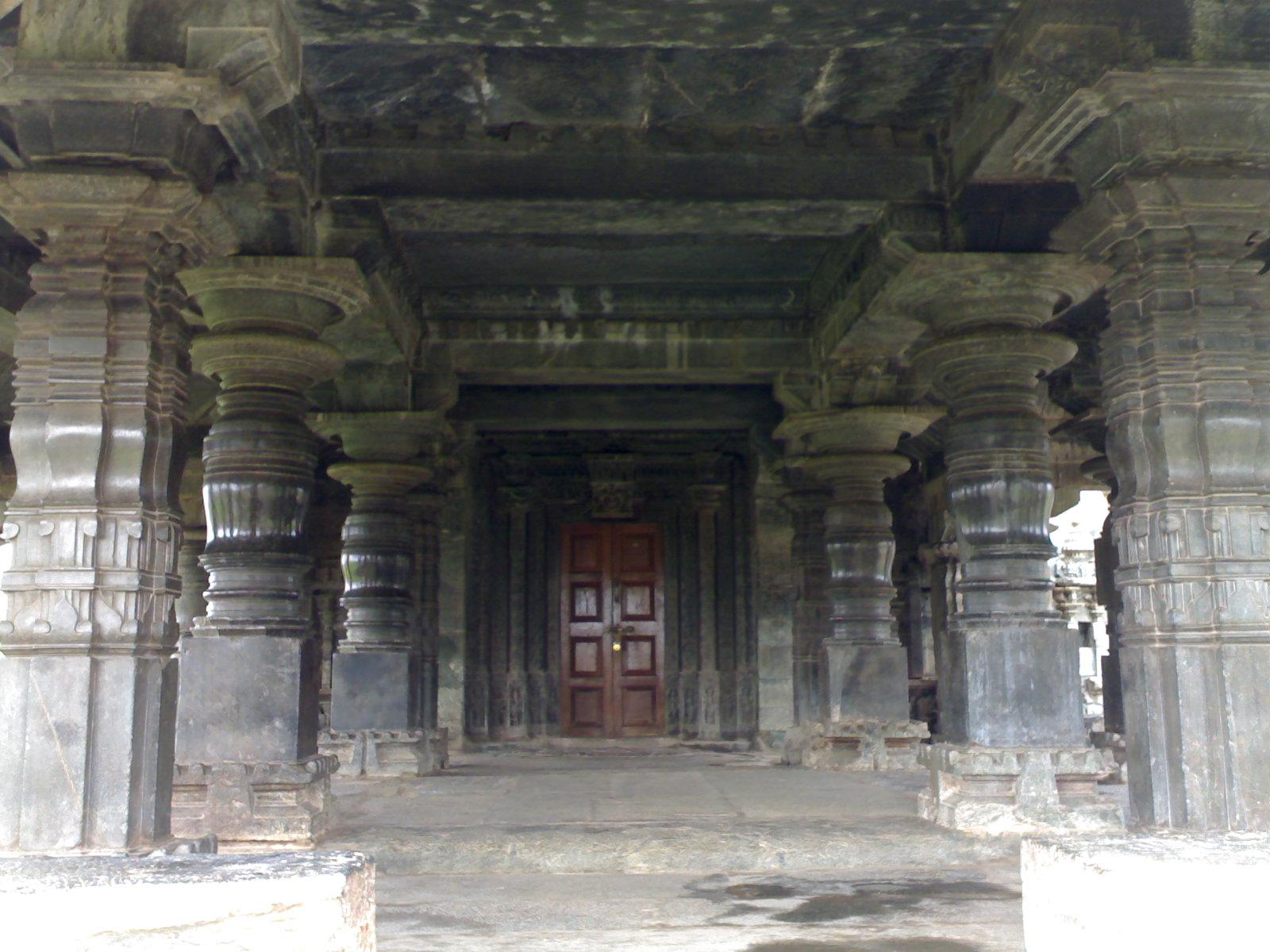
Nanneshwara Temple at Lakkundi

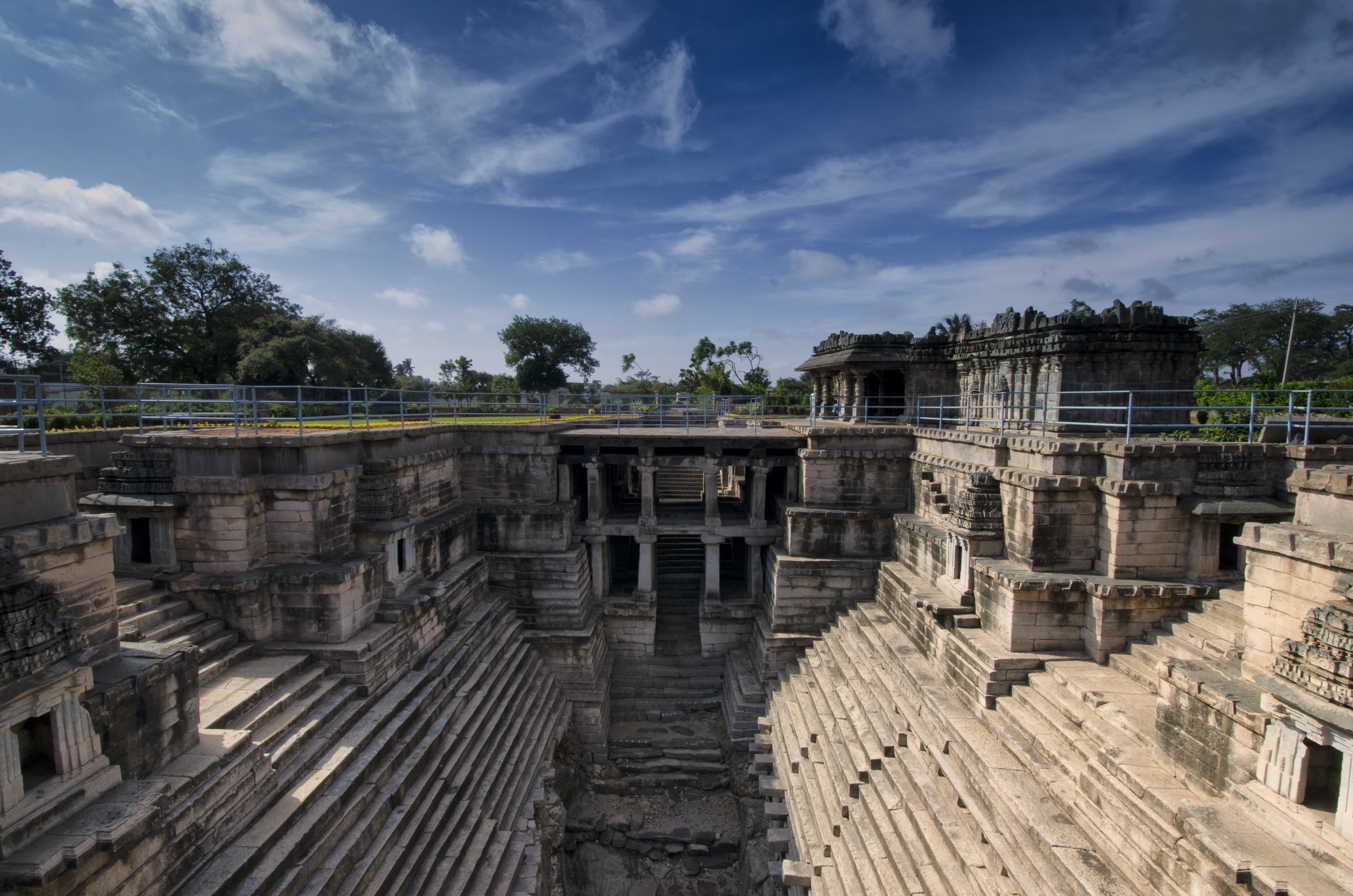
One of many stepwells (pushkarni, vav) in Lakkundi

Lakkundi tableau at Vishwa Kannada Sammelana, Belgaum

== See also ==
- Western Chalukya temples
- Western Chalukya architecture
- Western Chalukya Empire
- Annigeri
- Dambal
- Gadag
- Mahadeva Temple (Itagi)
- Kuknur
- Lakshmeshwar
- Kundgol
- Haveri
- Sudi
- Kamthana
- North Karnataka
- Tourism in North Karnataka
- Temples of North Karnataka
- Hindu temple architecture
- Hoysala architecture
- Vijayanagara architecture
- Badami Chalukya Architecture
- Dravidian architecture
