= Itagi, Gadag =

Itagi
- Village
- Location in Karnataka, India Itagi (India)
- Coordinates: 15.737636°N 75.826821°E
- Country: India
- State: Karnataka
- District: Gadag
- Talukas: Ron

Government
  - Body: Grama Panchayath

Area
  - Total: 27.48 km^{2} (10.61 sq mi)
- Elevation: 574 m (1,883 ft)

Population (2011)
  - Total: 4,533
  - Density: 165.0/km^{2} (427.2/sq mi)

Languages
  - Official: Kannada
- Time zone: UTC+5:30 (IST)
- Postal code: 582211

Itagi is a village in the southern state of Karnataka, India. It is located in the Rona taluk of Gadag district in Karnataka. As per census survey of 2011, its location code number is 601951.

== History ==
Itagi is the site of Narayan Swami temple. This temple was built in the 12th century and houses a tall Narayan Swami statue. Itagi has a lake, Itagi Lake, which is 56 acres in area. Itagi also has the oldest Demmavva or Gramdevi temple and Shri Kalameshwar temples. A Paraswanath Jain temple was constructed recently and totally constructed in stone. It has two masjids.

== Demographics ==
As of 2001 India census, Itagi had a population of 8331 with 4223 males and 4108 females. It is a fast-developing village. It is the largest Gram Panchayat village in Belgaum.

== See also ==
- Belgaum
- Districts of Karnataka
