= Attimabbe =

Chalukya queen

- Born: 950 AD
- Spouse: Nagadeva
- Father: Mallapa
- Religion: Jainism

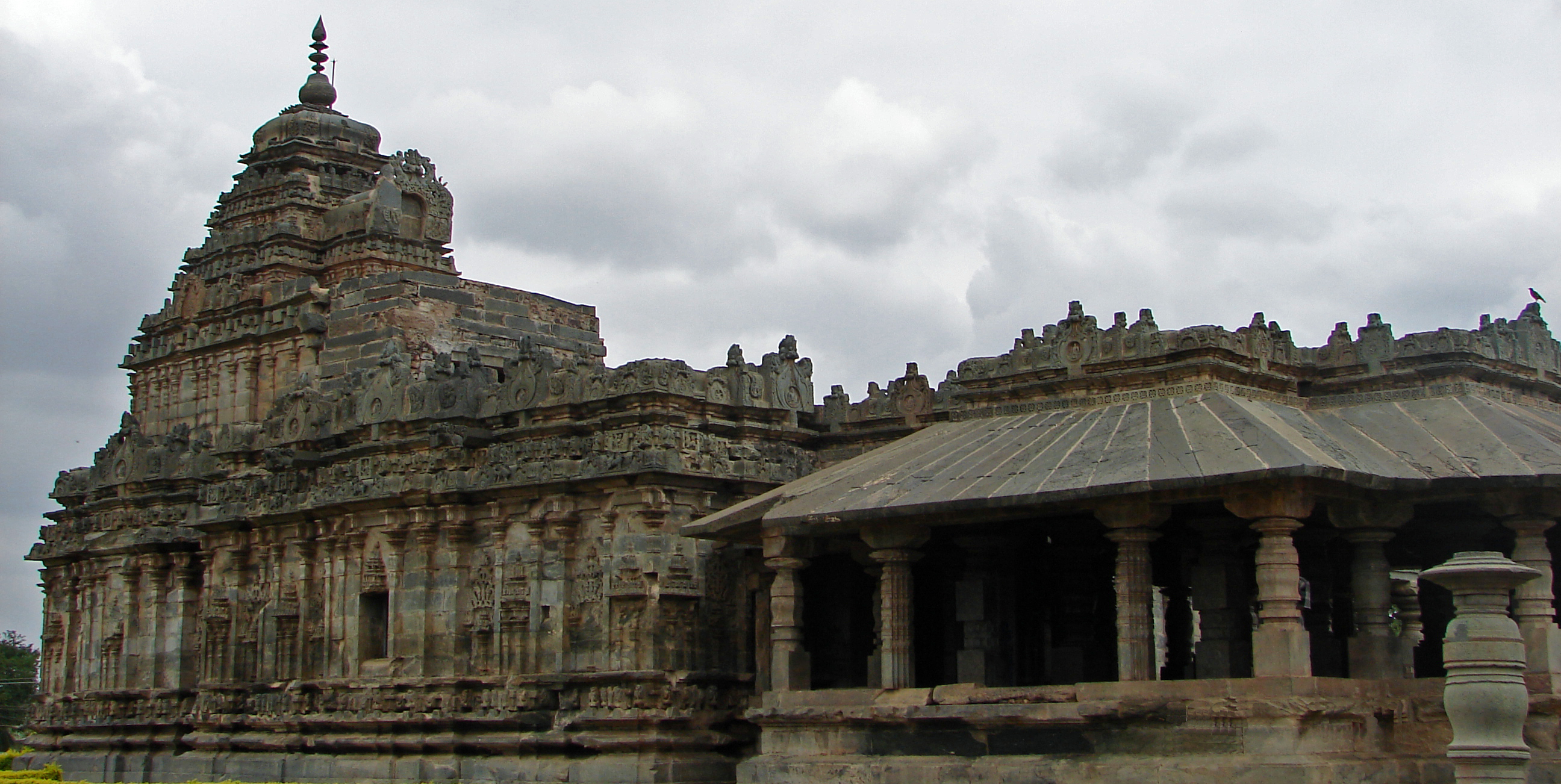
Brahma Jinalaya at Lakkundi

Attimabbe (950-1020) was a noblewoman of the Western Chalukya Empire.

She was born at Punganur of Chittoor district in Andhra Pradesh. She was the daughter of Feudatory Mallapa of chalukya king Tailapa II, and Ponnamayya. Attimabbe’s Father Mallapa belonged to “Vajiivamsa“ of Kondniya gotra and known as Dandnayaka title, bestowed by Tailapa II. Mallapa was a devout adherent to Jainism and a powerful figure in the imperial court of Tailapa II. She was contemporary to Ganga general and chief minister Chavundaraya.

Attimabbe was married to Nagadeva in 965 AD, the elder son of Dhallapa, Chief minister and general in chalukyan court. Dhallapa is also mentioned in Lakkundi inscription as a brave, highly learned, intelligent, proficient and valiant in war. It also credits the triumph over Vengi, Malwa, Konkan and Tigules. Nagadeva was also devout to Jainism and considered a bright star of “Vajjivamsa”. The victory of Gujarat and Vengi is credited to Nagadeva, as described in lakkundi Inscription. Attimabbe was the mother of Paduvala Tailap or Anniga.

Her husband Nagadeva was killed in battlefield in 984 AD, when Attimabbe was 34 years old. King Tailapa II himself came to Attimabbe to express his condolence on death of Nagadeva. She led a pious life after husband’s death, following the Jaina creed. She was devout to Jainism, and many marvels and miracles are attributed to her in Lakkundi Inscription. She is compared to many famous personalities like Rukmini, Satyabhama, Chelini, Rohini, Prabhawati, Sulochna, Marudevi, Sushaine, Sivadevi, lakshmana and Vijayasena. In above mentioned names; five names are of Jina savior’s Mother.

She is also honored by Poet Ranna as “DanaChintamani” means “Jewel among donors”. BrahmaShiva in Samayparikshe adores Attimabbe attributing many epitaphs like “gunadakhani”,”Vimala Charitre”, “Jain sasna rakshmani”, “Sajjanaka Chudamani”, “Akalanka Charite” and “Sarvakalavidhi”.

About 22 lithic records in Karnataka refer to high esteemed woman of nobility who have been compared to Attimabbe for their acts of charity and chastity. Moreover, an award on the name of Attimabbe was given to a female candidate every year by Karnataka government every year. Year 1994 was also celebrated as the year of Attimabbe.

Among her achievements were:

1. She caused the construction of 1500 Jain Shrines in her life and in addition one more at Lakkundi celebrated as Brahma Jinalaya.
2. She caused 1500 Jina images to be made and gifted them along with Gold bells and lamp of daily worship of Lord Jina.
3. She caused 1000 copies of Shantipurana to be made on palm leaves and distributed them to Jina preachers and scholars as “Shastra Daan”.
