= Brahma Jinalaya, Lakkundi =

11th-century Mahavira temple in Lakkundi, Gadag District of Karnataka state, India

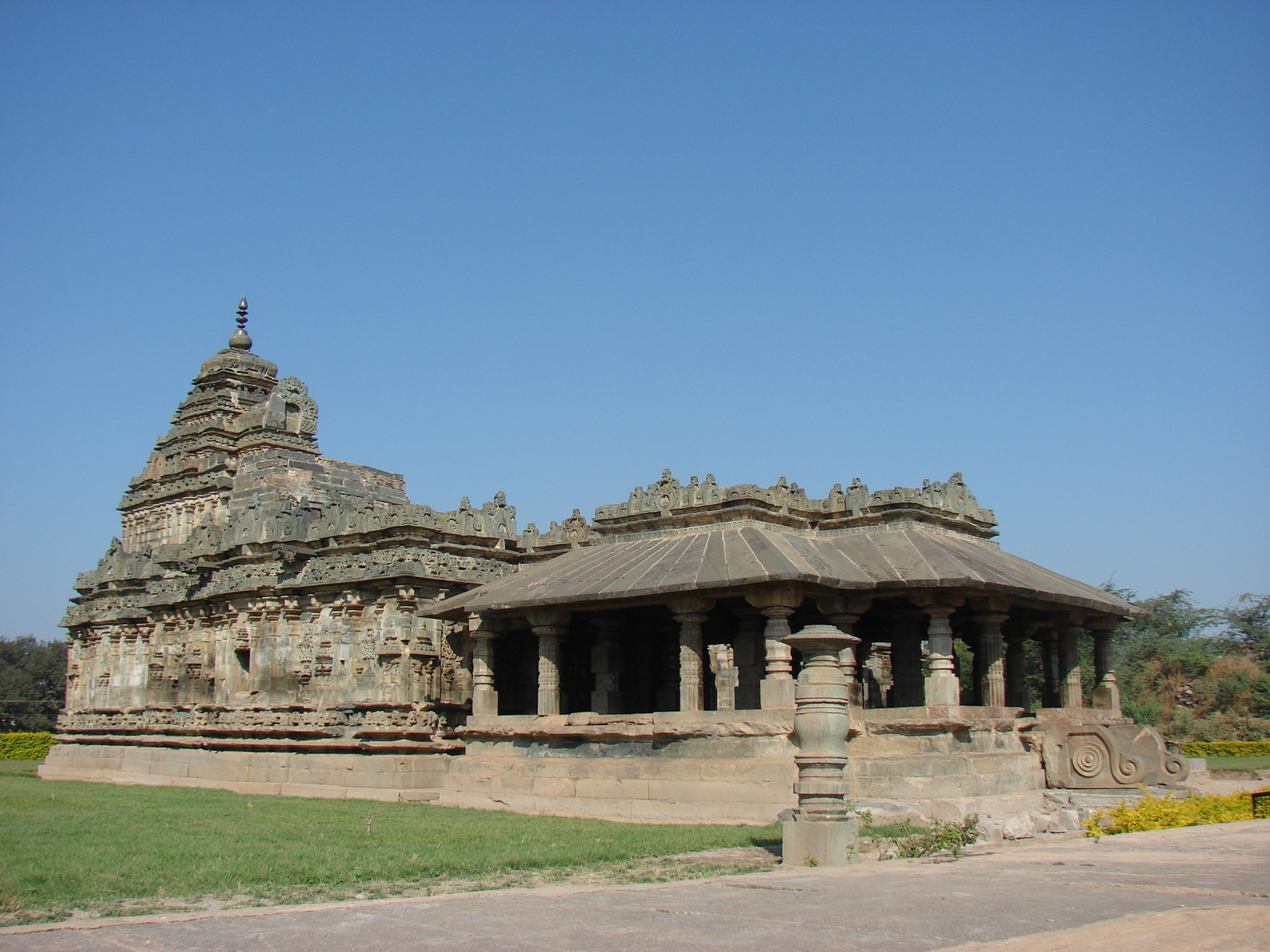
- Brahma Jinalaya

- Location within Karnataka Brahma Jinalaya, Lakkundi (India)

Religion
- Affiliation: Jainism
- Sect: Digambara
- Deity: Neminatha
- Festival: Mahavir Janma Kalyanak

Location
- Location: Lakkundi, Karnataka
- Coordinates: 15°23′22.2″N 75°42′51.2″E

Architecture
- Style: Western Chalukya architecture
- Creator: Attimabbe
- Established: 1007 CE
- Temple: 1

The Brahma Jinalaya, sometimes called as the Greater Jain Temple of Lakkundi, is an early 11th-century Neminatha temple in Lakkundi, Gadag District of Karnataka state, India. The temple is attributed to Attiyabbe (Danacintamani Attimbbe), the wife of the local governor Dandanayaka Nagadeva. It faces east, has a mukhamandapa, a gudhamandapa and its sanctum is covered by a sur-temple style vimana superstructure. The temple is notable for its reliefs depicting Jaina artwork, statues of the Tirthankaras and the two statues of Brahma and Saraswati inside its inner mandapa.

The temple was ruined and mutilated during or after the wars of the 13th-century. It was rediscovered by British archaeologists led by Henry Cousens in "deserted, filthy condition, occupied by a colony of bats" with beheaded Mahavira statue outside. Now cleaned and restored, the Jain temple of Lakkundi is one of many historic Chalukya era Jain and Hindu temples found in Lakkundi. It is the oldest major Jain temple in this region.

Archaeological Survey of India has listed this basadi in the complex in the list of "Must See" Indian Heritage.

== Location ==
Lakkundi is about 12 kilometers southeast of Gadag-Betageri twin city, between Hampi and Goa. It can be reached by India's National Highway 67. The Bramha Jinalaya temple is one of many Jain and Hindu temples found in and around Lakkundi. It is located on the southwest side of the village, near few other historic Jaina temples.

== History ==
The town of Lakkundi was known as Lokkigundi in medieval times. It was of considerable importance during the 11-12th century A.D. Western Chalukya rule, and hosted a number of Jain and Hindu temples. The Brahma Jinalaya was built in 1007 CE by Attimabbe, wife of Nagadeva, who served as general under both Taila II and Satyashraya Irivabedanga (997-1008 A.D.). The temple represents the second phase of Kalyani Chalukyas art. In 1191 A.D., the noted Hoysala empire king Veera Ballala II made this town an important garrison.

The temple includes several inscriptions that helps date this temple and the gifts it received before the 14th-century. When mentioned, the temple is called Brahma Jinalaya of Lokkigundi in these historic inscriptions.

== Architecture ==
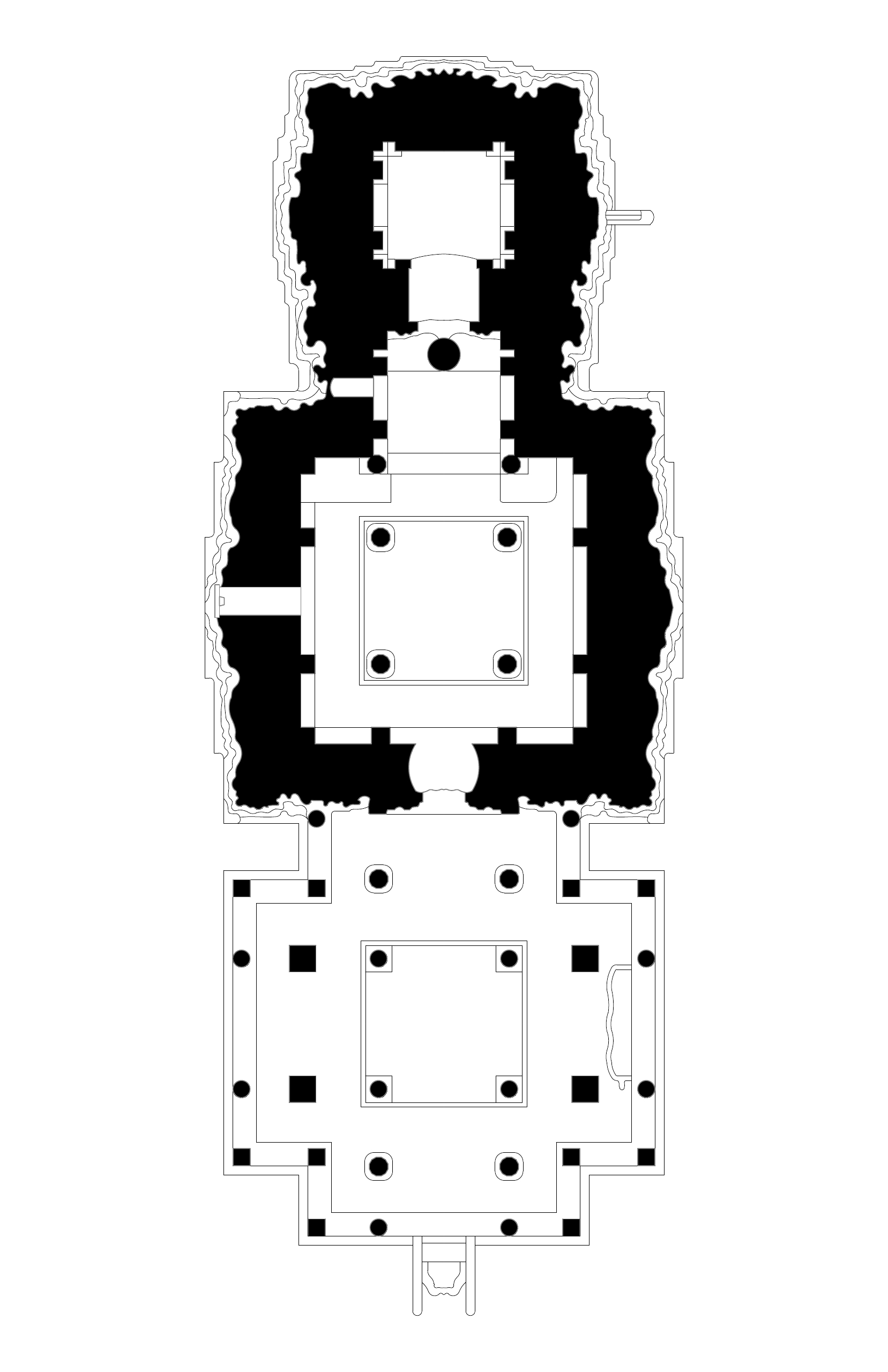
Brahma Jinalaya temple plan, Lakkundi, Karnataka

According to the art historian Adam Hardy, the temple illustrates the "Later Chalukya architecture, mainstream Lakkundi school of mid-11th century with late 11th century superstructure (shikhara)". The temple has single shrine (ekakuta) connected to a closed mantapa hall via a vestibule (sukanasi or ardhamantapa) that is connected to another, open mantapa. This temple is one of the fine illustrations of the Western Chalukya architecture. The temple has a garbhagriha, an antarala, a closed navaranga mandapa, and an open pillared mukha-mandapa. Over the garbhagriha is the three storeyed nirandhara vimana with a square griva and sikhara. Above the cornice of these arched niches at regular intervals is a seated Jaina figure. The ceilings are plain and pillars are well decorated. The open mandapa is supported by 32 pillars and pilasters.

According to art critic Percy Brown, these elements are found commonly in all Western Chalukya temples. The building material is soapstone, which according to Percy Brown became the standard in later Hoysala architecture as well. According to art historians Henry Cousens and Om Prakash, the most conspicuous feature of the Western Chalukya temples is the decrease in the size of masonry and the resulting decrease in the overall height of the temples compared to those built by the Badami Chalukyas at Pattadakal. This was a result of a shift in the basic building material, from sandstone to the more workable soapstone (Chloritic schist). In the coming decades, this transformation was to lead Vesara architecture toward increased ornamentation and articulation.

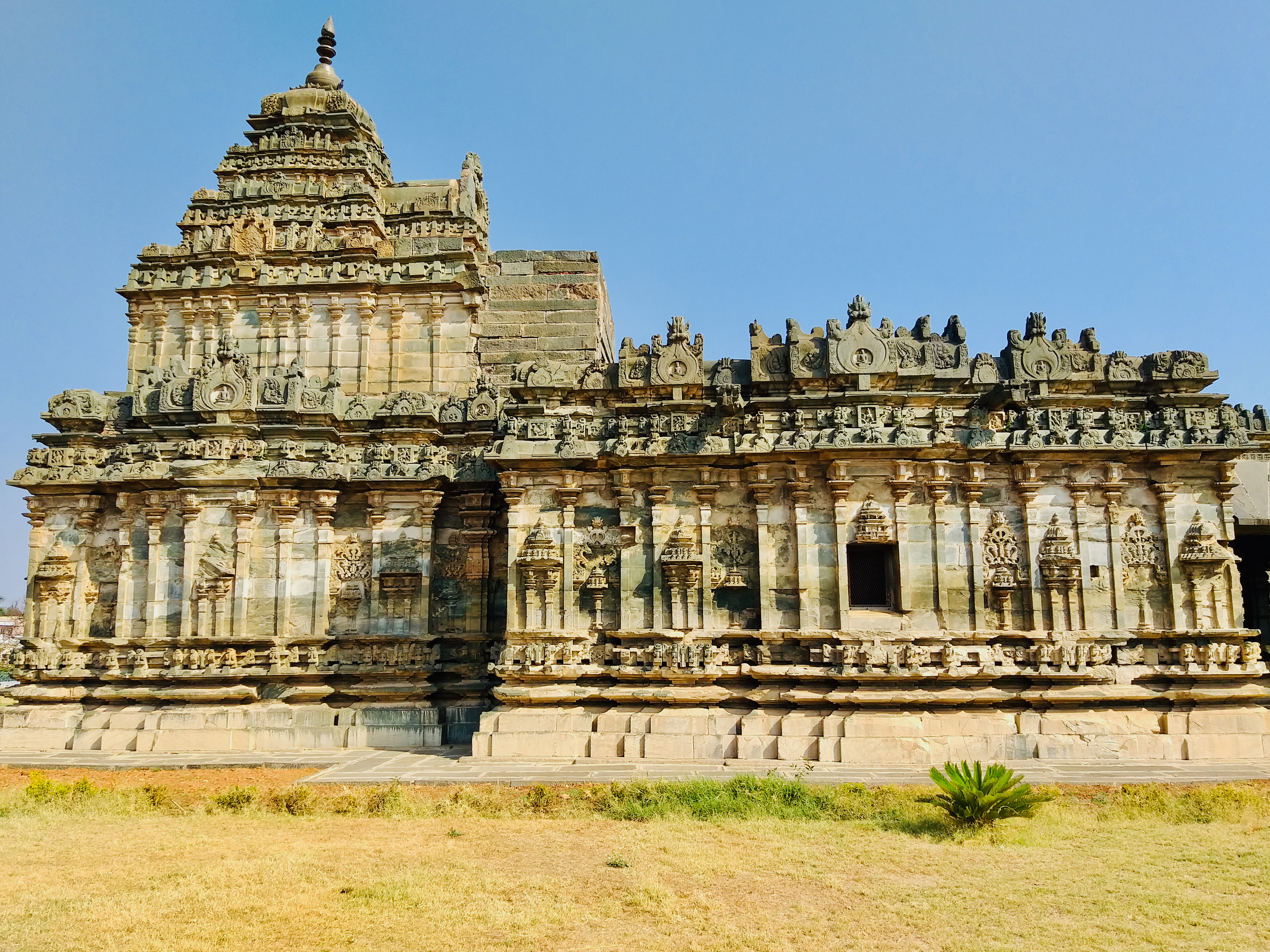
A view of the Brahma Jinalaya from its south.

The temple style is quite similar to the older Shiva temple in Kukkanur, and they represent the transition phase between early Chalukya and Late Chalukya styles. He categorizes the tower over the shrine as Dravidian (south Indian) with a square plan. Kamath classifies it as Vesara because each tier are encrusted with motifs that make the tower more "curvilinear". According to Cousens, the overall structure with its well proportioned tiers and finial (amalaka, kalasha) give the superstructure a "majestic" look. Above the cornice are circular niches, each of which holds the image of a Jain saint (Jaina) in relief, with a kirtimukha decoration above. The walls of the shrine have pilasters, with the spaces between them containing, in relief, pavilions, and miniature decorative towers (aedicula) on slender half pilasters. Some miniature towers have niches below them. Overall, decorative ornamentation is taken to a new level compared to earlier temples.

Dhaky and Meister call the temple as the Great Jaina temple of Lakkundi, thereby differentiating it from other minor Jaina temples of Lakkundi.

== Sculpture ==
There are several notable freestanding sculptures in the temple:

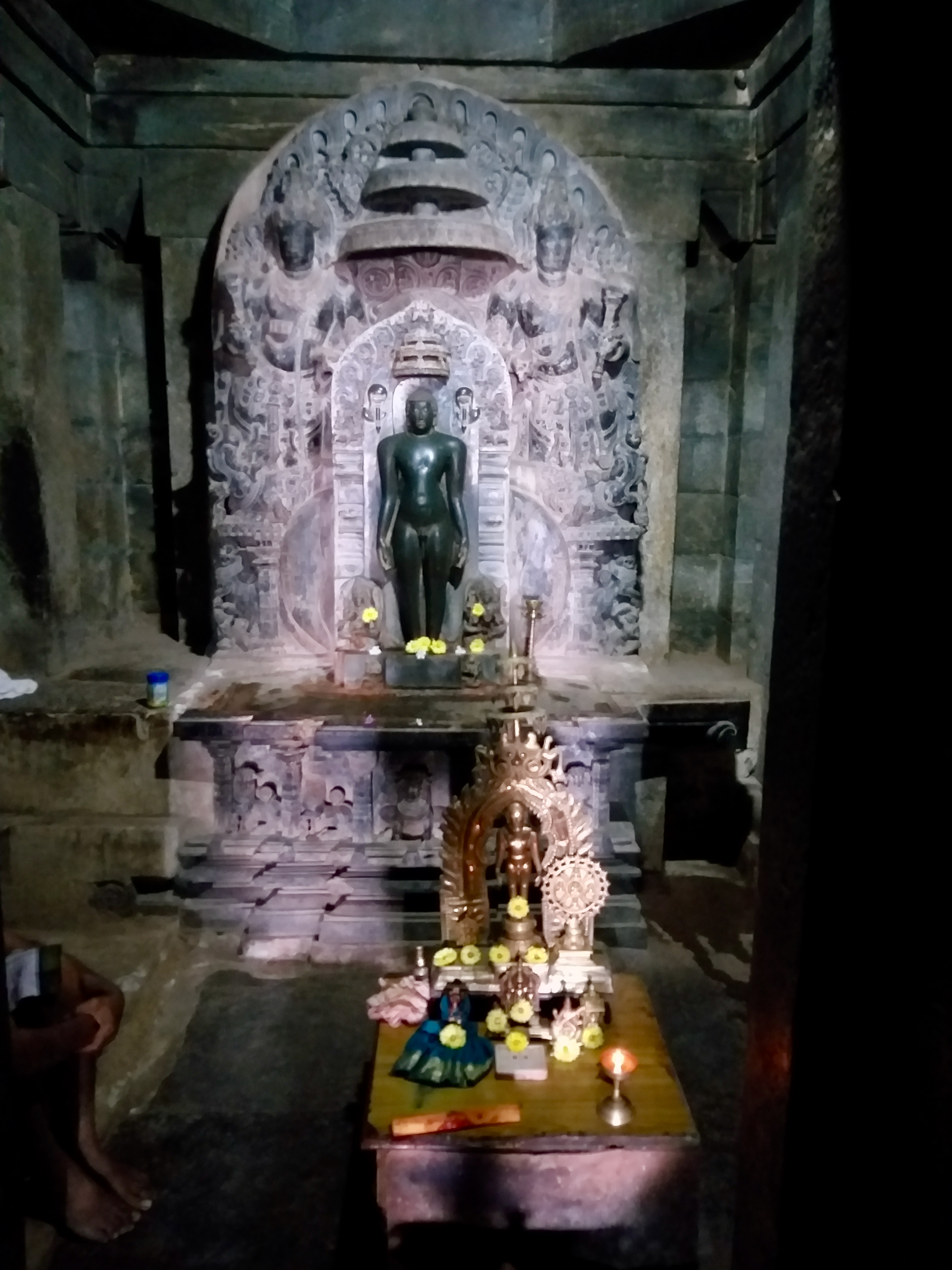
The Tirthankara statue inside the temple

- A beheaded image of Mahavira that is a little over 4 feet tall, made of black polished stone and seated on a "lion throne" (simhaasana) is found outside the temple. The sanctum's door lintel (lalita-bimba) depicts Mahavira, which in Indian tradition typically marks the sanctum's primary dedication. It is therefore believed that originally this idol was housed as the primary sanctum deity of temple.
- In the contemporary era, the sanctum has a statue of Neminatha as the mulnayak with yaksha and yakshi on either side. There is a beautiful sculpture of seven hooded Parshva in Kayotsarga position with yakshi and yaksha on both sides. The sculpture of Padmavati sitting with left knee upright besides Parshva depicts Goddess with goad and noose in right and left upper arms respectively and the lower hands are in varadamudra with fruit. Cousens states it may have been taken out and left there. The saint has an attendant on either side, holding a chowri (a type of brush) in one hand a fruit in another.
- A large standing, monolithically carved four-headed Brahma stands in the inner hall. He is shown predominantly with Hindu iconography, but the pedestal is shown with Jaina art such as those of lions.
- Opposite Brahma in the inner mandapa is the statue of a goddess which Cousens and many scholars consider Saraswati given the iconographic details. The alternate interpretation is that she is a Jaina goddess which shares some features with Saraswati. As depicted, in each of her four hands she holds an attribute; a ankusa (elephant goad), a petaled flower, a book and a citron.
- The doorframes are intricately carved in five parallel bands (panchasakha) in the famous Karnata plateresque style, with hamsavali, padmamala, bhutasakha and ratnasakha. The pedya figures include Rati and Kamadeva.
- A serenely contemplative Parsvanatha with seven-headed snake hood above his head but damaged (broken limbs, mutilated nose, mutilated sexual organs); it was discovered outside the temple by Cousens, now moved for safekeeping by ASI.

In addition to these sculptures, reliefs of Jaina goddesses and apsaras are depicted on the pillars. On the door lintel at the entrance to the vestibule, an image of Gajalakshmi (Hindu goddess Lakshmi with elephants on either side) is shown like other historic temples of Jainism.

== Lakkundi Utsav ==
Lakkundi Utsav is two-day annual cultural event organised annually. The event has main stage with temples as the background, is named 'Daana Chintamani Attimabbe Vedike' after 11th century queen Attimabbe.

== Protection ==
The temple is protected as a monument of national importance by the Archaeological Survey of India (ASI). Karnataka government has announced setting up Lakkundi Development Authority for the development of Lakkundi at cost of Rs. 3 crores. More than 50 ruined, mutilated Jain and Hindu sculpture, 3 inscriptions were discovered during tourist facility development and site restoration efforts at the nearby Naganatha temple – another Jain temple. Some of these sculpture are on display near the Brahma Jinalaya temple in a shed, conserved by the ASI.

== Gallery ==
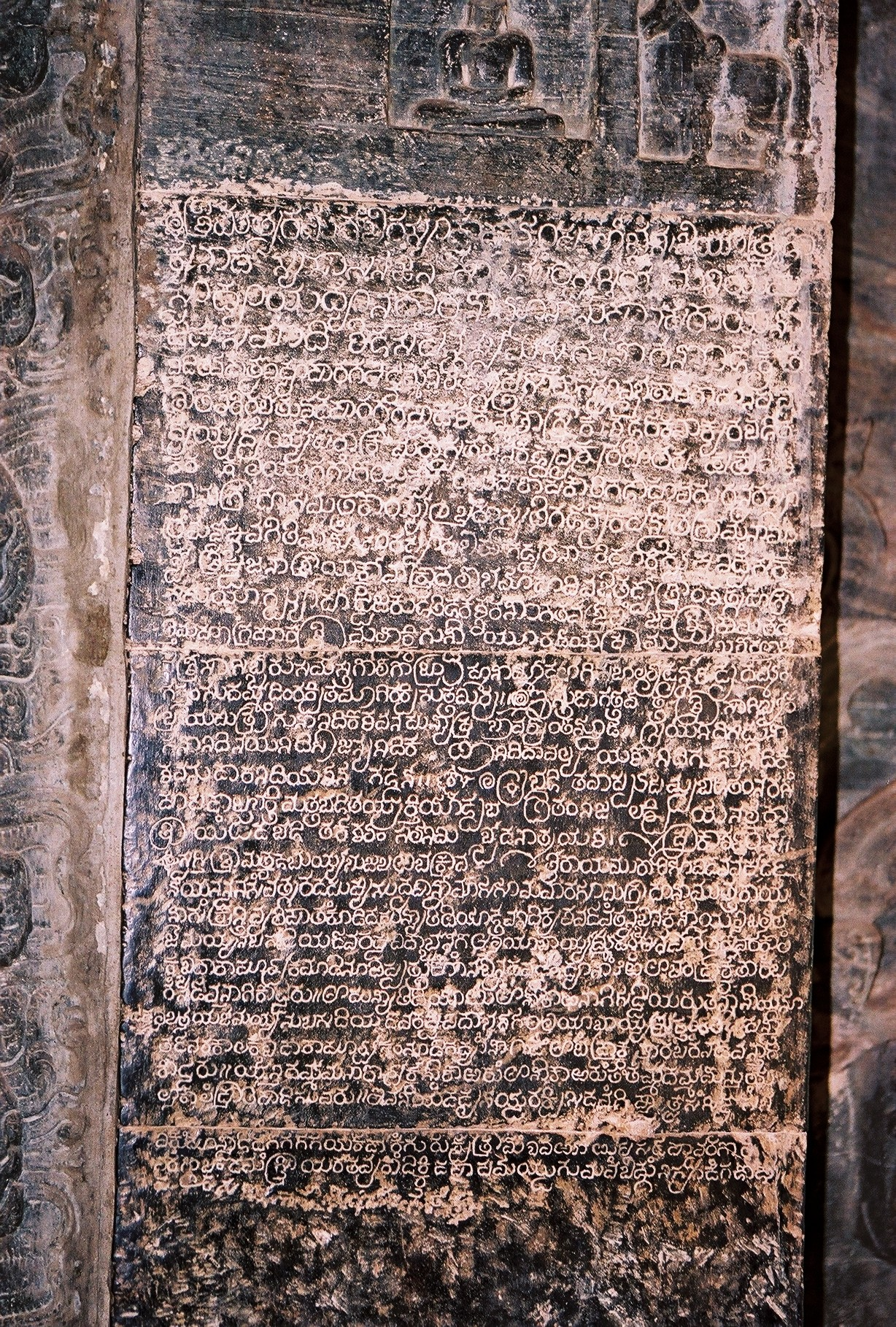
Old Kannada inscription dated 1172 A.D. at Jain temple in Lakkundi

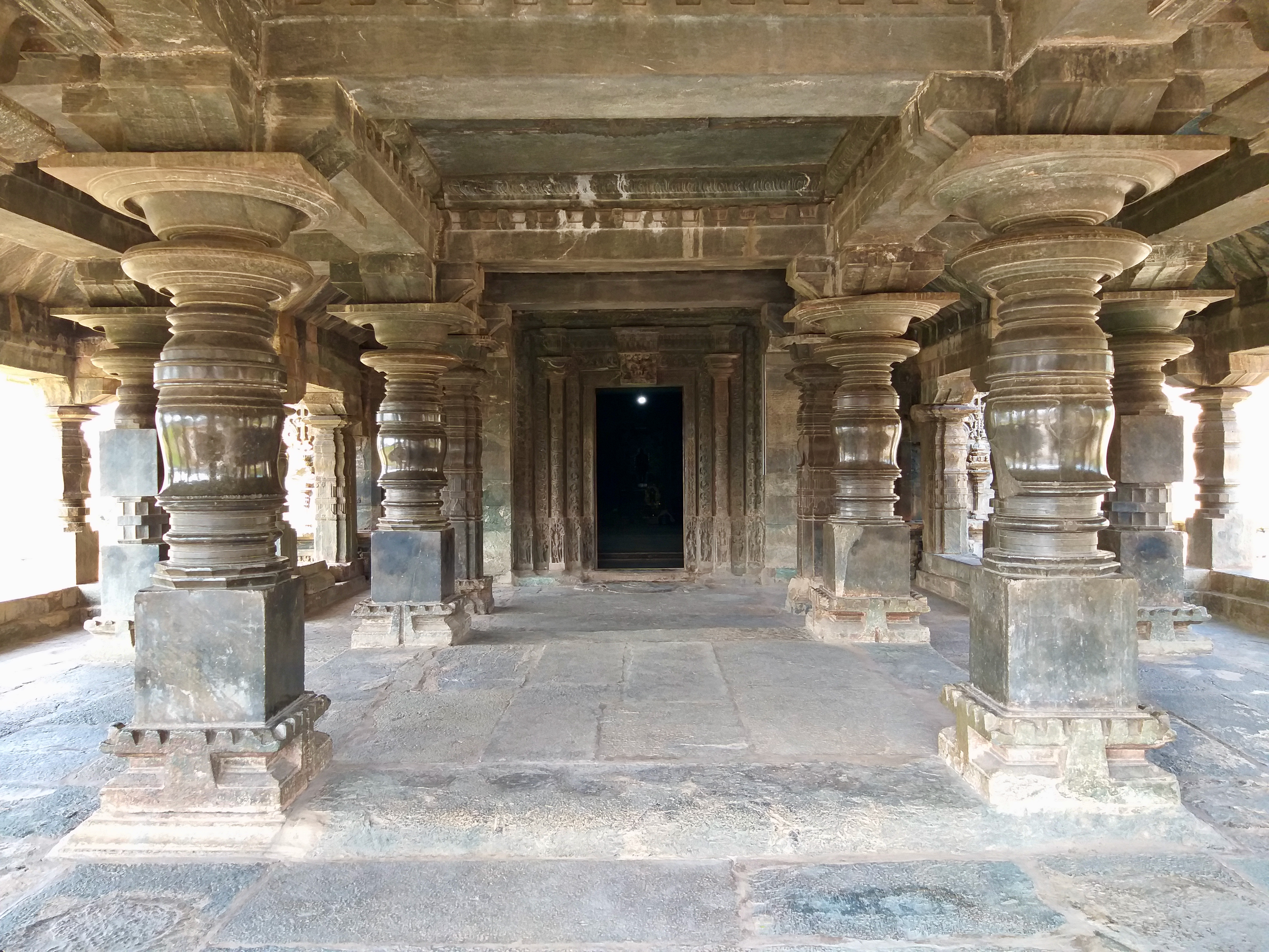
Mukhamandapa (entrance, open)

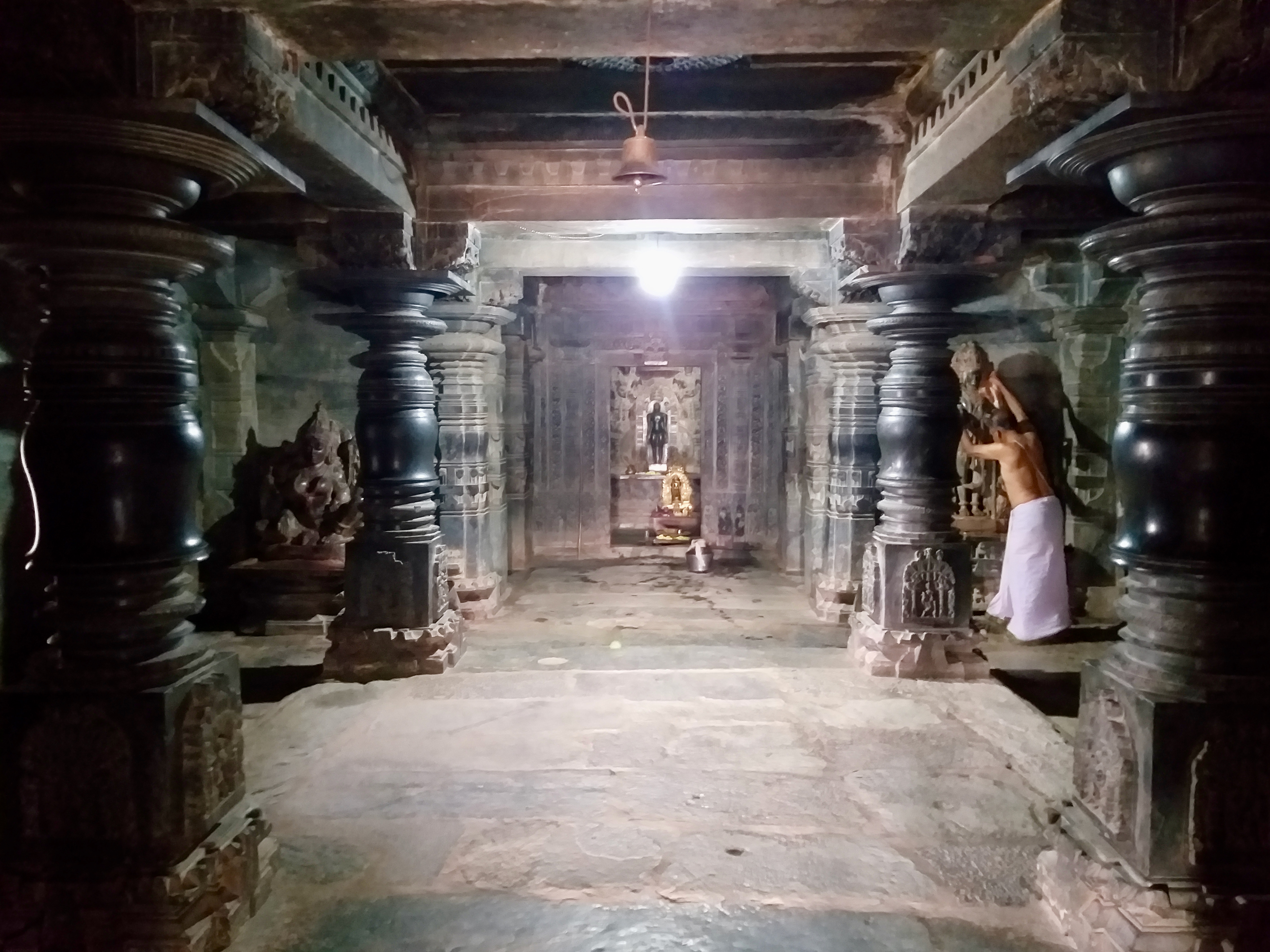
Gudhamandapa (inner, closed)

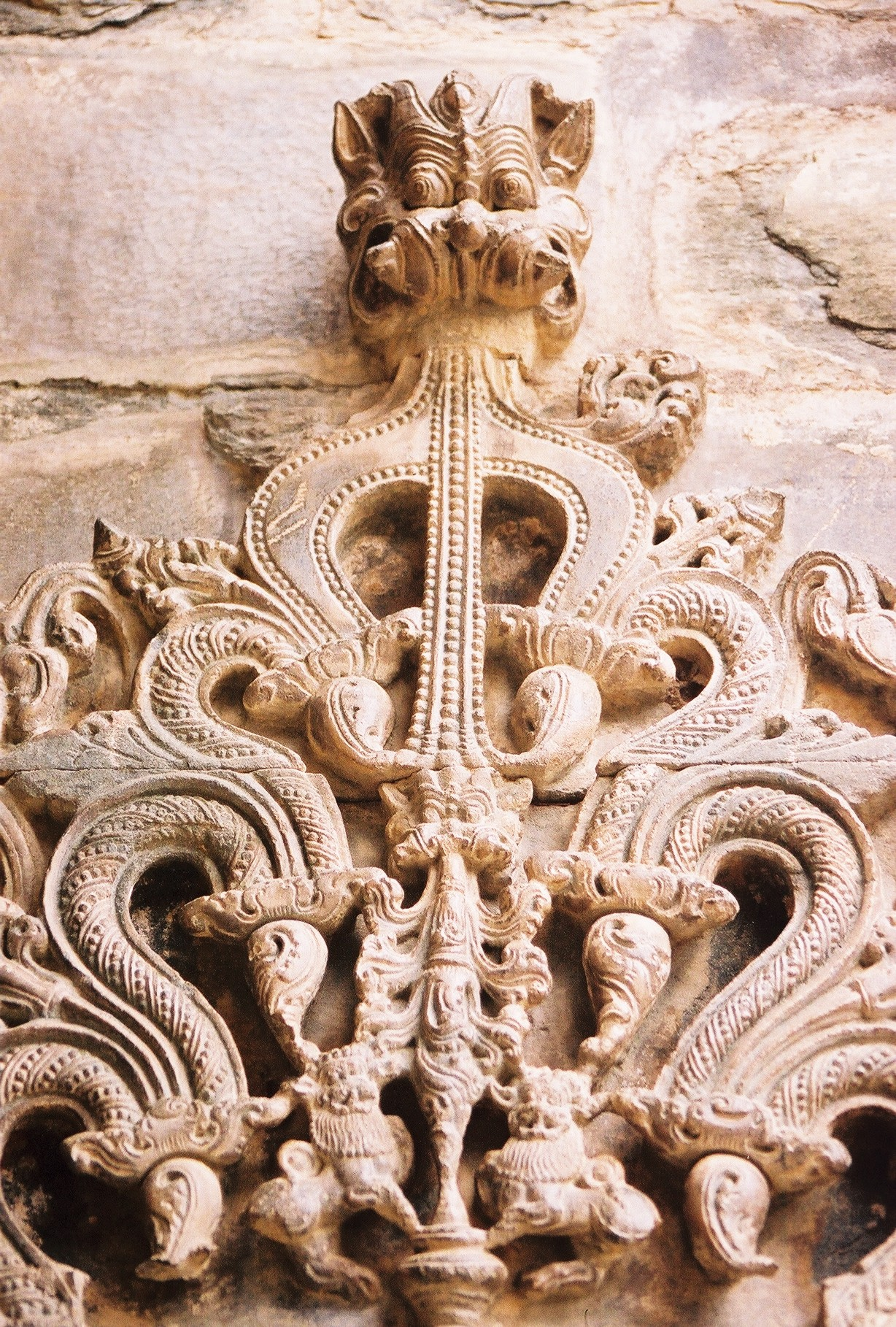
Kirtimukha wall relief

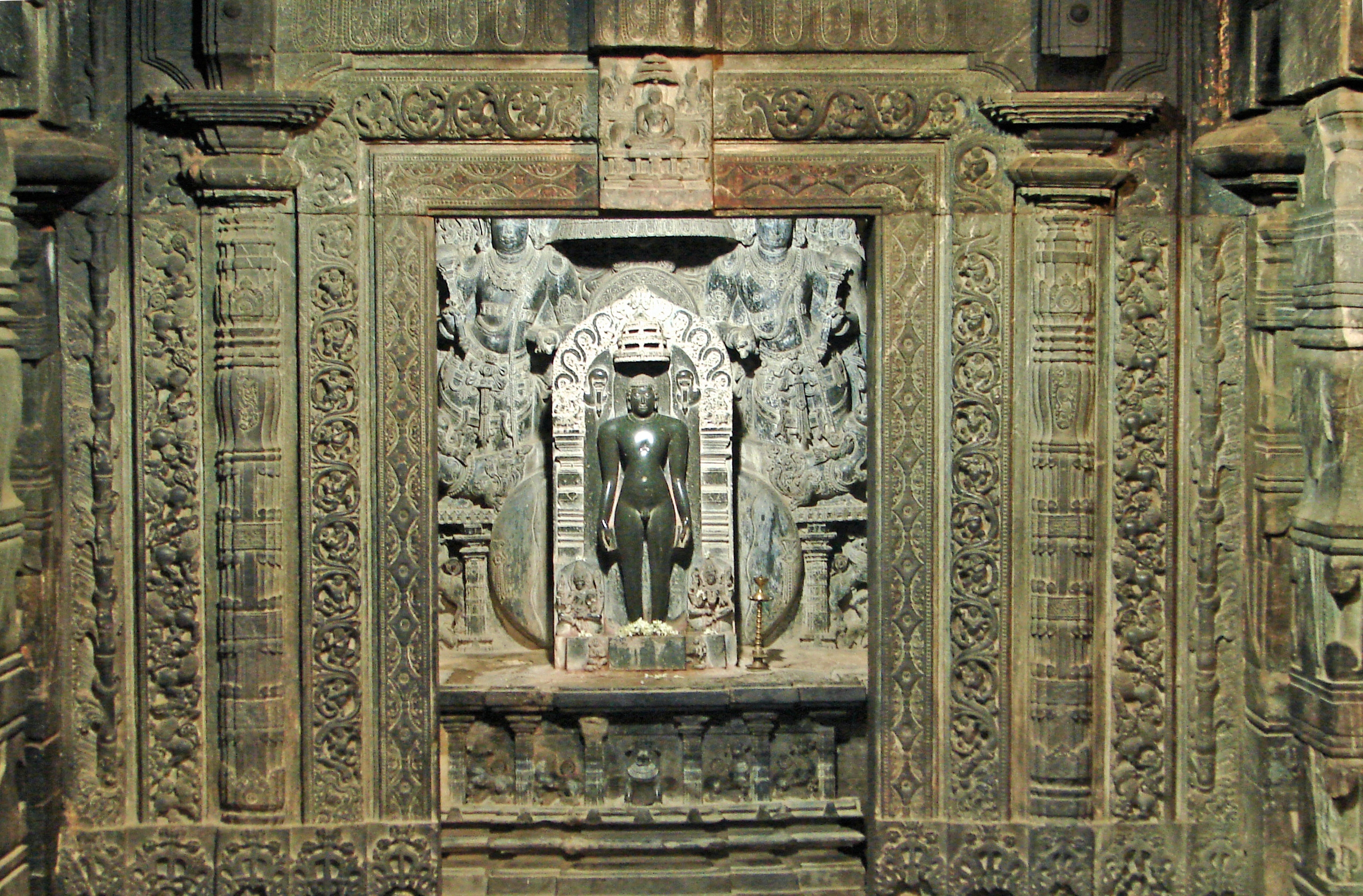
Neminatha image in sanctum, doorframe and lintel decoration

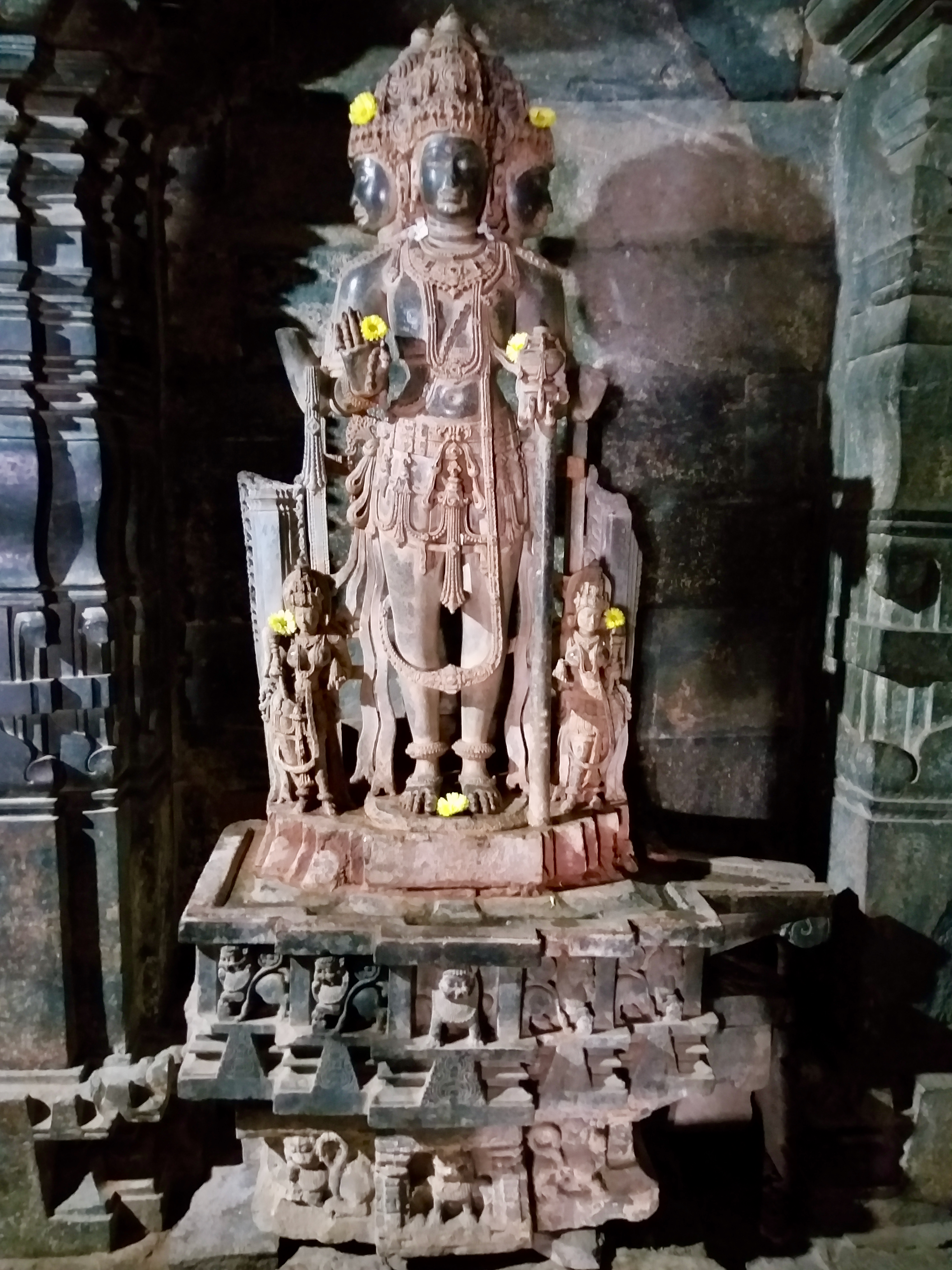
Chaturmukha, four-faced Brahma inside with Jaina-base decoration

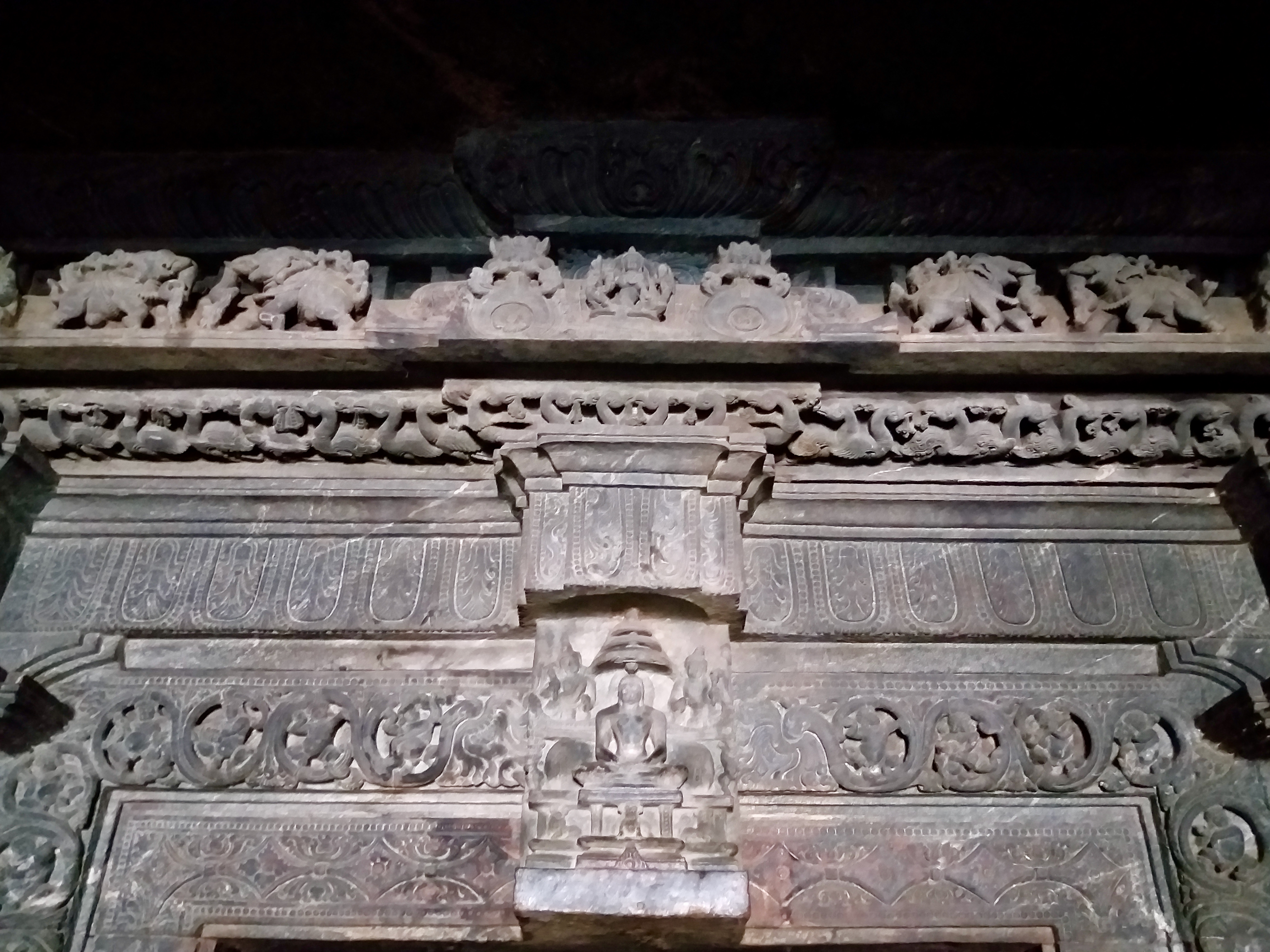
Mahavira on the lalita-bimba of the sanctum, evidence that the temple was originally dedicated to Mahavira

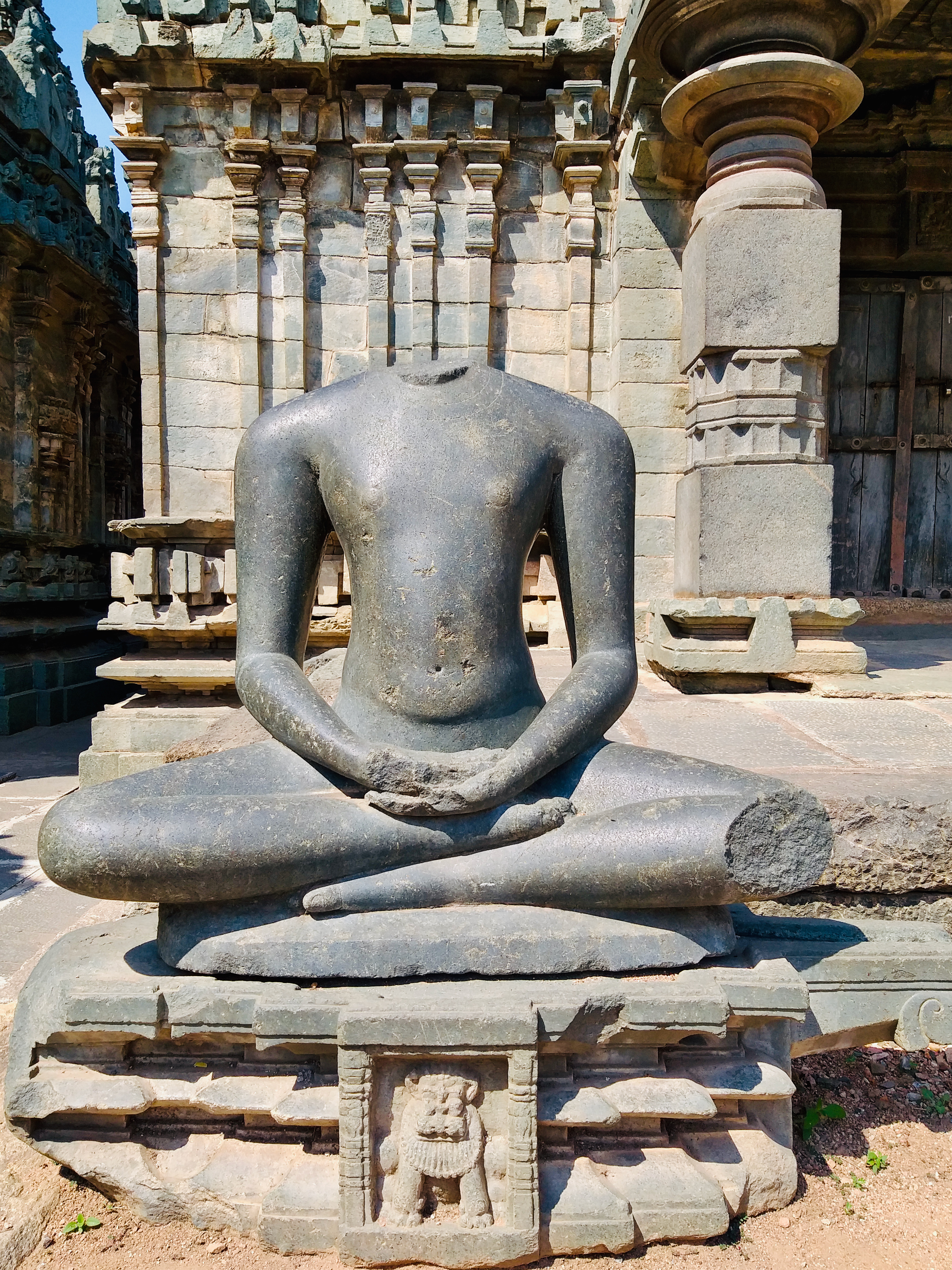
Damaged idol of Mahavira, the original mulnayaka idol

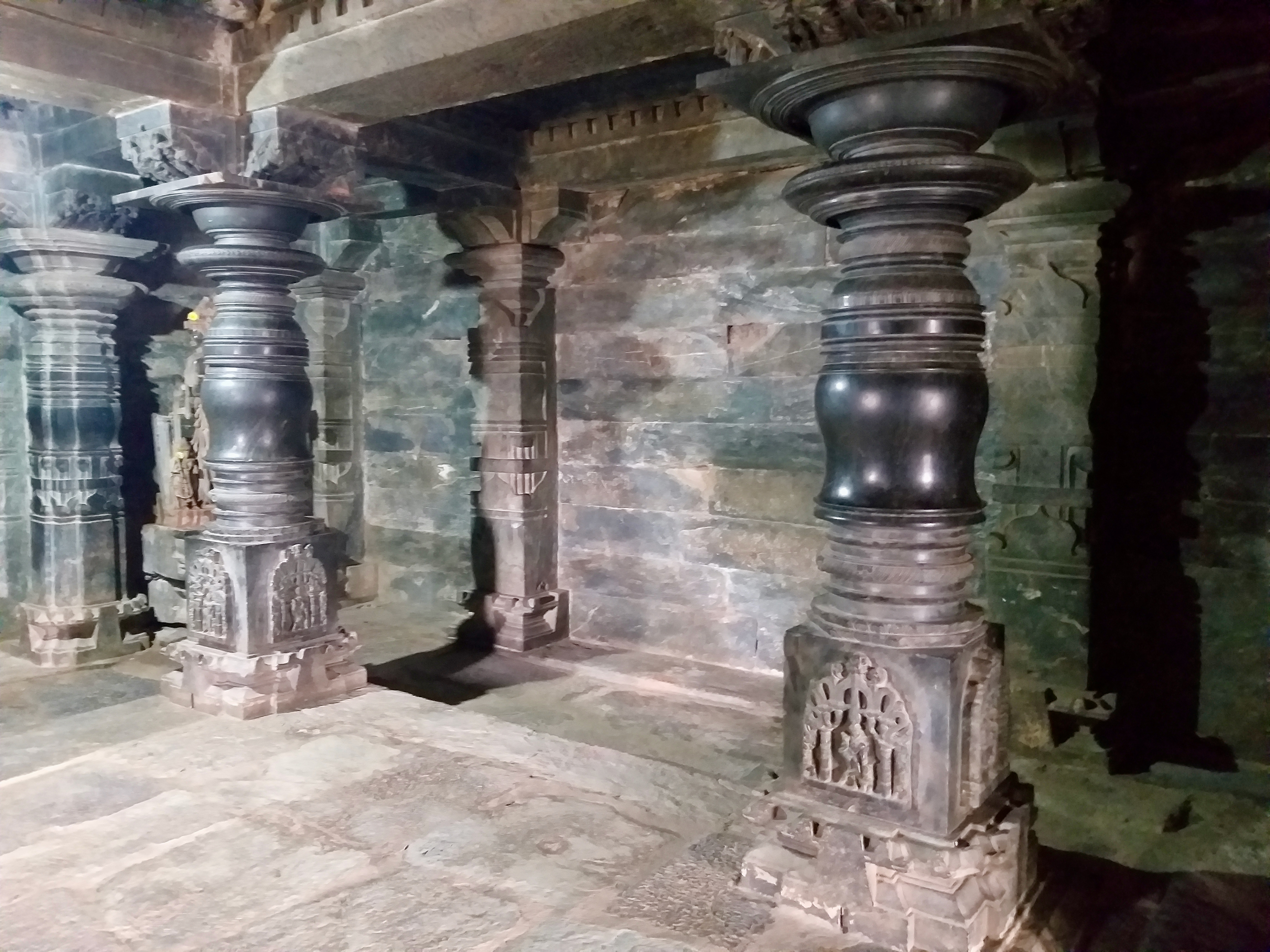
Inner mandapa pillars, Jaina artwork in the lower sections

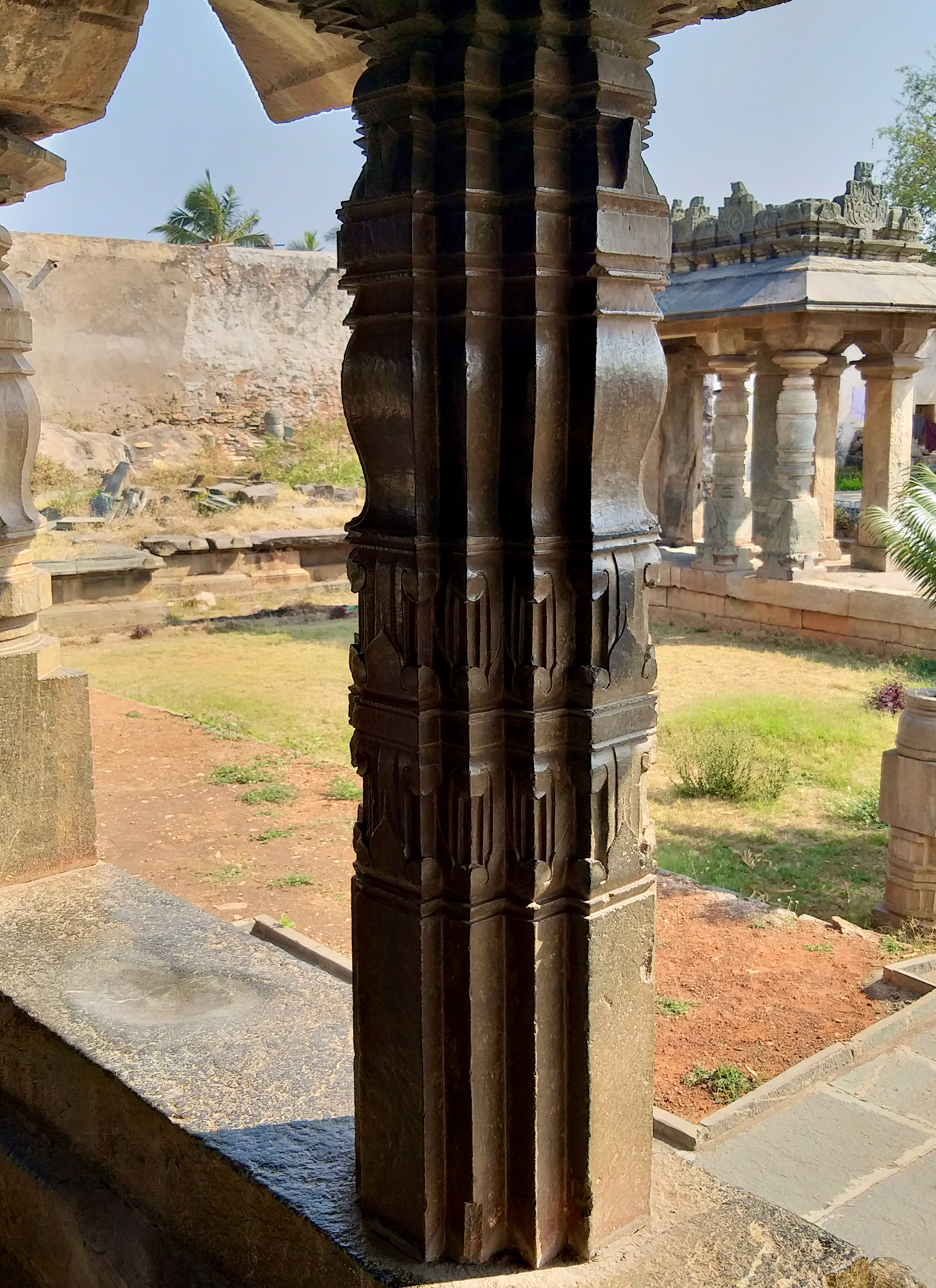
Outer mandapa pillar

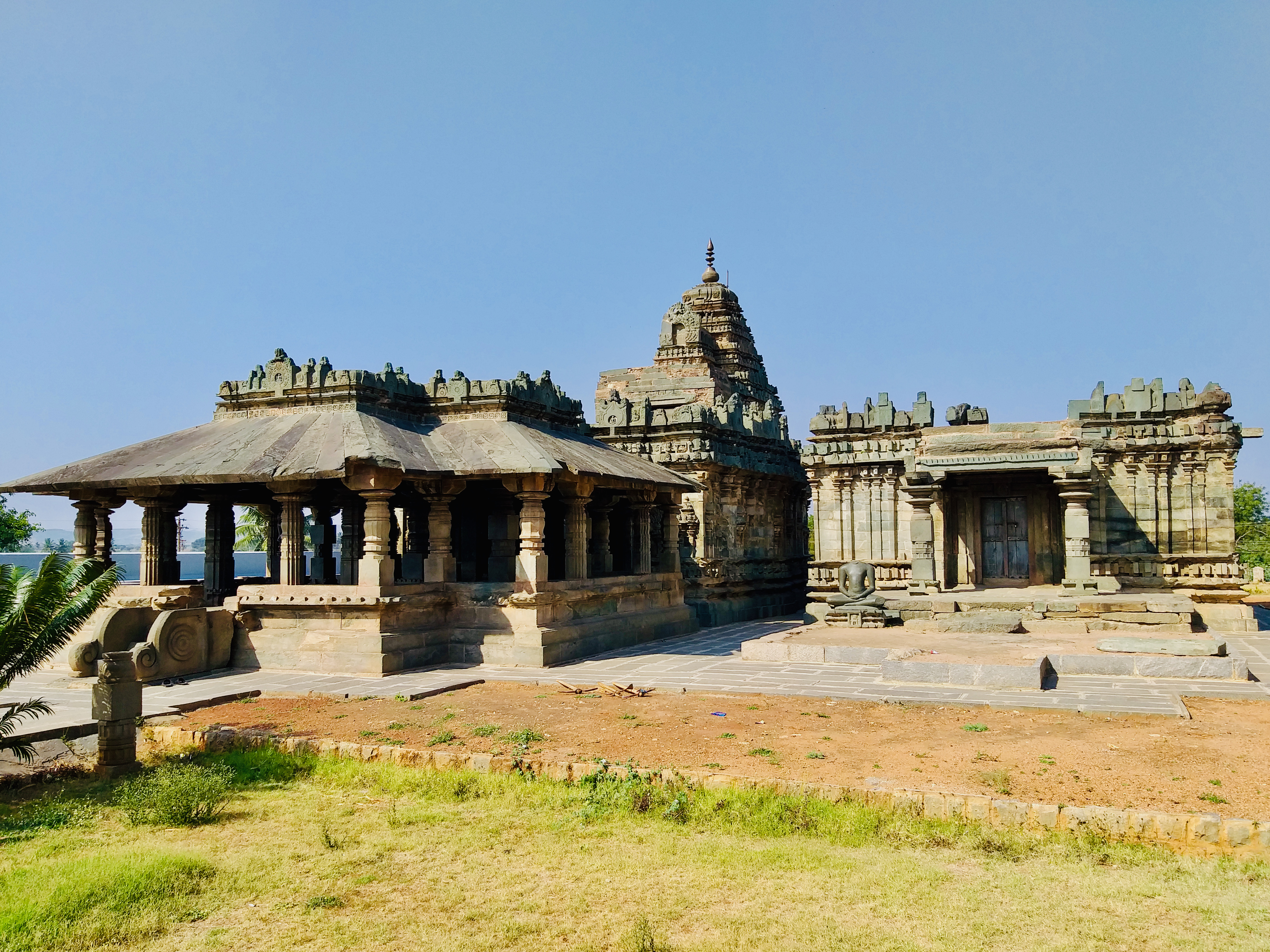
Another view, showing the secondary Jain shrine north of the Greater Jain temple of Lakkundi

== See also ==
- Akkana Basadi
- Shantinatha Basadi, Jinanathapura
- Lakshmeshwara Jain temples
