= List of Monuments of National Importance in Madhya Pradesh/East =

The following structures in eastern Madhya Pradesh have been designated as Monuments of National Importance by the Archaeological Survey of India (ASI).

In this list, the ASI recognized monuments in the eastern part of Madhya Pradesh are described, in the districts Balaghat, Bhind, Chhatarpur, Chhindwara, Damoh, Datia, Ashok Nagar, Jabalpur, Katni, Mandla, Panna, Raisen, Rewa, Sagar, Satna, Seoni, Anuppur, Shahdol, Sidhi and Vidisha. For the western part of Madhya Pradesh, see List of Monuments of National Importance in Madhya Pradesh/West.

SL. No.	Description	Location	Address	District	Coordinates	Image
N-MP-1	Joda Temple	Baihar		Balaghat	22°06′20″N 80°33′25″E	Joda Temple More images
N-MP-2	Fort	Garhi		Balaghat		Upload Photo
N-MP-3	Old fort and temples	Lanji		Balaghat	21°30′00″N 80°32′38″E	Old fort and temples More images
N-MP-4	An old temple within the limits of Piparwara forest Village	Raigarh		Balaghat		Upload Photo
N-MP-5	Koteshwar Mahadev Temple	Lanji		Balaghat	21°30′39″N 80°33′13″E	Koteshwar Mahadev Temple
N-MP-6	53 images locally knows known as Sada Bhada	Sonkhar		Balaghat		Upload file
N-MP-7	Brick Temples (two)	Kherat		Bhind	26°43′49″N 78°35′30″E	Upload Photo
N-MP-8	Open Air Museum	Kherat		Bhind		Upload Photo
N-MP-9	Ater Fort	Ater		Bhind	26°44′52″N 78°38′14″E	Ater Fort More images
N-MP-11	Chausath Yogini Temple	Khajuraho		Chhatarpur	24°50′59″N 79°55′05″E	Chausath Yogini Temple More images
N-MP-12	Chitragupta temple	Khajuraho		Chhatarpur	24°51′16″N 79°55′12″E	Chitragupta temple More images
N-MP-13	Chopra or square tank	Khajuraho		Chhatarpur	24°51′22″N 79°55′10″E	Chopra or square tank More images
N-MP-14	Devi Jagadambi Temple	Khajuraho		Chhatarpur	24°51′12″N 79°55′11″E	Devi Jagadambi Temple More images
N-MP-15	Kandariya temple	Khajuraho		Chhatarpur	24°51′11″N 79°55′11″E	Kandariya temple More images
N-MP-16	Lakshman temple	Khajuraho		Chhatarpur	24°51′08″N 79°55′18″E	Lakshman temple More images
N-MP-17	Lalguan Mahadeva temple	Khajuraho		Chhatarpur	24°51′03″N 79°54′41″E	Lalguan Mahadeva temple More images
N-MP-18	Mahadeva Temple	Khajuraho		Chhatarpur	24°51′12″N 79°55′11″E	Mahadeva Temple More images
N-MP-19	Matangeswara Temple	Khajuraho		Chhatarpur	24°51′07″N 79°55′18″E	Matangeswara Temple More images
N-MP-20	Nandi Temple	Khajuraho		Chhatarpur	24°51′12″N 79°55′22″E	Nandi Temple More images
N-MP-21	Parvati Temple	Khajuraho		Chhatarpur	24°51′12″N 79°55′19″E	Parvati Temple More images
N-MP-22	Varaha Temple	Khajuraho		Chhatarpur	24°51′07″N 79°55′20″E	Varaha Temple More images
N-MP-23	Vishvanath Temple	Khajuraho		Chhatarpur	24°51′12″N 79°55′21″E	Vishvanath Temple More images
N-MP-24	Adinath Temple	Khajuraho		Chhatarpur	24°50′42″N 79°56′12″E	Adinath Temple More images
N-MP-25	Brahma Temple	Khajuraho		Chhatarpur	24°50′57″N 79°55′58″E	Brahma Temple More images
N-MP-26	Colossal statue of Shri Hanuman	Khajuraho		Chhatarpur	24°51′00″N 79°55′43″E	Colossal statue of Shri Hanuman
N-MP-27	Ghantai Temple	Khajuraho		Chhatarpur	24°50′46″N 79°56′00″E	Ghantai Temple More images
N-MP-28	Khakhra Math	Khajuraho		Chhatarpur	24°51′13″N 79°56′52″E	Upload Photo
N-MP-29	Parsvanatha Temple	Khajuraho		Chhatarpur	24°50′42″N 79°56′11″E	Parsvanatha Temple More images
N-MP-30	Santinatha Temple	Khajuraho		Chhatarpur	24°50′41″N 79°56′10″E	Santinatha Temple More images
N-MP-31	Vamana Temple	Khajuraho		Chhatarpur	24°51′05″N 79°56′06″E	Vamana Temple More images
N-MP-32	Javari Temple	Khajuraho		Chhatarpur	24°50′58″N 79°56′07″E	Javari Temple More images
N-MP-33	Dulhadev Shiva Temple	Khajuraho		Chhatarpur	24°50′20″N 79°55′55″E	Dulhadev Shiva Temple More images
N-MP-34	Jatakari or Chaturbhuj Temple	Khajuraho		Chhatarpur	24°49′30″N 79°55′52″E	Jatakari or Chaturbhuj Temple
N-MP-35	Inscription in the fort of Bachau	Bachhaon		Chhatarpur	24°59′21″N 80°05′56″E	Upload Photo
N-MP-36	Temple remains and mounds at Bijamandal	Jatkara near Khajuraho		Chhatarpur	24°49′46″N 79°56′04″E	Temple remains and mounds at Bijamandal More images
N-MP-37	Deogarh Fort	Deogarh		Chhindwara	21°52′58″N 78°43′58″E	Deogarh Fort More images
N-MP-38	Nohta ( Mahadeva ) Temple	Nohta		Damoh	23°40′18″N 79°34′53″E	Nohta ( Mahadeva ) Temple
N-MP-39	Rajnagar ( Ruined ) Fort	Rajnagar		Damoh	23°48′04″N 79°28′36″E	Upload Photo
N-MP-40	Rangmahal Palace	Hatta		Damoh	24°07′47″N 79°35′42″E	Upload Photo
N-MP-41	(Siva) Temple of Bari Kanoda	Bari Kanoda		Damoh	24°16′31″N 79°26′15″E	Upload Photo
N-MP-42	Jata Shankar Fort	Jatashankar		Damoh	23°49′23″N 79°26′57″E	Upload Photo
N-MP-43	Matha at Raneh	Raneh		Damoh	24°08′05″N 79°43′13″E	Upload Photo
N-MP-44	(Siva Temple) Old Temple	Kodal		Damoh	23°19′50″N 79°23′03″E	Upload Photo
N-MP-45	The remains of an old sculptures temple built without mortar and attributed to Chandelas	Kanoda(Konora)		Damoh	24°08′21″N 79°28′13″E	Upload Photo
N-MP-46	A hill Fort	Singorgarh		Damoh	23°32′07″N 79°45′06″E	Upload Photo
N-MP-47	Ruined Fort	Madiyado		Damoh	24°16′41″N 79°39′19″E	Upload Photo
N-MP-48	Shiva Temple	Sakour		Damoh	24°12′41″N 79°42′59″E	Shiva Temple More images
N-MP-49	Sculptures at Phutera tank	Phutera tank		Damoh	23°50′51″N 79°26′39″E	Upload Photo
N-MP-50	Flat roofed temples below the hill	Kundalpur		Damoh	23°59′05″N 79°43′20″E	Upload Photo
N-MP-51	Jain Temples on Hill No.1 to No. 58	Kundalpur		Damoh	23°59′00″N 79°43′13″E	Jain Temples on Hill No.1 to No. 58 More images
N-MP-52	Beer Singh Palace	Datia		Datia	25°40′15″N 78°27′03″E	Beer Singh Palace More images
N-MP-53	Ashoka Minor Rock Edict	Gujjara		Datia	25°34′37″N 78°32′45″E	Ashoka Minor Rock Edict More images
N-MP-122	Budhi Chanderi ruinsJains temple No. 1 to 5	Budhichanderi		Ashok Nagar	24°48′20″N 78°04′50″E	Budhi Chanderi ruinsJains temple No. 1 to 5 More images
N-MP-123	Chanderi Fort	Chanderi		Ashok Nagar	24°42′38″N 78°08′22″E	Chanderi Fort More images
N-MP-124	Bada Madarsa	Chanderi		Ashok Nagar	24°43′36″N 78°07′48″E	Upload Photo
N-MP-125	Battisi Baoli	Chanderi		Ashok Nagar	24°43′39″N 78°07′30″E	Upload Photo
N-MP-126	Badal Mahal Gateway	Chanderi		Ashok Nagar	24°42′38″N 78°08′12″E	Badal Mahal Gateway More images
N-MP-127	Jama Masjid	Chanderi		Ashok Nagar	24°42′37″N 78°08′07″E	Jama Masjid More images
N-MP-128	Kati Ghati	Chanderi		Ashok Nagar	24°41′48″N 78°07′55″E	Kati Ghati More images
N-MP-129	Koshak Mahal	Chanderi		Ashok Nagar	24°41′59″N 78°06′25″E	Koshak Mahal More images
N-MP-130	Tomb of Nizam-ud-din's	Chanderi		Ashok Nagar	24°42′41″N 78°08′12″E	Tomb of Nizam-ud-din's More images
N-MP-131	Shahzadi ka Roza	Chanderi		Ashok Nagar	24°43′11″N 78°08′01″E	Shahzadi ka Roza More images
N-MP-132	Monastery	Kadwaha		Ashok Nagar		Monastery More images
N-MP-133	Temple No . 2 to 7	Kadwaha		Ashok Nagar	24°57′49″N 77°54′46″E	Temple No . 2 to 7 More images
N-MP-134	Loose Sculptures	Thubon		Ashok Nagar	24°39′43″N 77°59′38″E	Loose Sculptures More images
N-MP-135	Sitamarhi Group of Temples	Thoban, Tehsil Chanderi		Ashok Nagar	24°38′58″N 77°59′32″E	Sitamarhi Group of Temples More images
N-MP-136	Hanuman Marhi Group of Temples	Thoban, Tehsil Chanderi		Ashok Nagar	24°39′30″N 77°59′48″E	Hanuman Marhi Group of Temples
N-MP-137	Hori ki Marhia Group of Temples	Thoban, Tehsil Chanderi		Ashok Nagar	24°39′47″N 77°59′59″E	Hori ki Marhia Group of Temples More images
N-MP-138	Gargaj and Mahadev Ghat Group of Temples	Thoban, Tehsil Chanderi		Ashok Nagar	24°39′38″N 77°59′27″E	Gargaj and Mahadev Ghat Group of Temples More images
N-MP-139	Kuti Group of Temples	Thoban, Tehsil Chanderi		Ashok Nagar	24°39′49″N 77°59′35″E	Kuti Group of Temples More images
N-MP-140	Andhakuan Group of Temples	Thoban, Tehsil Chanderi		Ashok Nagar	24°39′59″N 77°59′45″E	Andhakuan Group of Temples More images
N-MP-154	Vishnu Varah Temple Statue of a boar (Vishnu : Varah), an image of Mahadeo and figures of other Hindu & Jain Gods scattered over four Tumuli and under a Bargat tree	Karitalai		Katni	24°03′37″N 80°43′33″E	Vishnu Varah Temple Statue of a boar (Vishnu : Varah), an image of Mahadeo and figures of other Hindu & Jain Gods scattered over four Tumuli and under a Bargat tree More images
N-MP-155	Varaha Near Karitalai	Karitalai		Katni	24°03′37″N 80°43′32″E	Varaha Near Karitalai More images
N-MP-156	Tortoise and fish; known as Kachha and Maccha	Karitalai		Katni	24°03′14″N 80°42′25″E	Tortoise and fish; known as Kachha and Maccha More images
N-MP-157	The whole site of Kankali Devi Temple and Durgadevi temple	Tigawa		Katni	23°41′26″N 80°04′00″E	The whole site of Kankali Devi Temple and Durgadevi temple More images
N-MP-158	Vishnu-Varaha Temple	Bilhari		Katni	23°47′29″N 80°16′27″E	Vishnu-Varaha Temple More images
N-MP-159	Tapsi-Math	Bilhari		Katni	23°47′33″N 80°16′18″E	Tapsi-Math More images
N-MP-160	Madan Mahal on the top of hill upon a large boulder rock	Garha		Jabalpur	23°08′54″N 79°54′06″E	Madan Mahal on the top of hill upon a large boulder rock More images
N-MP-161	Temple of Somnath and ruins of several temples	Badgaon		Katni	23°55′06″N 80°01′07″E	Upload Photo
N-MP-162	Rock edict of Ashoka, Rupnath	Padariya		Katni	23°38′26″N 80°01′56″E	Rock edict of Ashoka, Rupnath
N-MP-163	Ruined temple near the sources of the Kiyan river	Marha Deori		Katni	23°55′59″N 80°15′13″E	Upload Photo
N-MP-164	Shiva Temple on a carved stone chabutra measuring 10' x 10'x 4' and 8 stone Jain Images	Nanhwara		Katni		Upload Photo
N-MP-165	Karanbel at Tripur Sundri Temple	Tewar		Jabalpur	23°08′49″N 79°49′07″E	Upload Photo
N-MP-166	Temple of Gauri Shankar within the Chausath Yogini	Bheraghat		Jabalpur	23°07′47″N 79°48′05″E	Temple of Gauri Shankar within the Chausath Yogini More images
N-MP-167	Temple of Chausath Yogini	Bheraghat		Jabalpur	23°07′47″N 79°48′05″E	Temple of Chausath Yogini More images
N-MP-168	Large effiggy on Vishnu Varaha	Panagar		Jabalpur	23°17′04″N 79°59′53″E	Upload Photo
N-MP-169	Ancient Mound	Kakarehta		Jabalpur		Upload Photo
N-MP-170	Ladaki Ka Tila	Bilhari		Katni	23°48′08″N 80°16′22″E	Upload Photo
N-MP-171	Rinmukteswara Temple	Kukaramath		Dindori	22°51′54″N 81°09′58″E	Rinmukteswara Temple More images
N-MP-172	Gond fort called Satkhanda and the tower on Rajghat called Shahburja and the Rajrajeshwari temple inside the fort	Mandla		Mandla	22°35′16″N 80°22′11″E	Upload Photo
N-MP-173	Begum Mahal	Chaugaon		Mandla	22°37′33″N 80°31′39″E	Begum Mahal More images
N-MP-174	Sporting Palace by name Dal-Badal	Chaugaon		Mandla	22°37′31″N 80°31′08″E	Upload Photo
N-MP-175	Shiva's temple	Khardeori		Mandla	22°34′48″N 80°24′24″E	Upload Photo
N-MP-214	Ajaigarh fort and its remains	Ajaigarh		Panna	24°53′40″N 80°15′54″E	Ajaigarh fort and its remains
N-MP-215	Two Temples ascribed to Gupta period	Ajaigarh		Panna	24°53′22″N 80°16′11″E	Two Temples ascribed to Gupta period More images
N-MP-216	Parvati temple	Nachna		Panna	24°23′57″N 80°26′52″E	Parvati temple More images
N-MP-217	Chaumukhnath temple	Nachna		Panna	24°23′58″N 80°26′50″E	Chaumukhnath temple More images
N-MP-218-a	Bhojeshwar temple	Bhojpur		Raisen	23°06′05″N 77°34′45″E	Bhojeshwar temple More images
N-MP-218-b	Ancient Rock Engravings	Bhojpur		Raisen	23°06′05″N 77°34′45″E	Ancient Rock Engravings More images
N-MP-219	Fort (including walls Gates and other ruins monuments in the fort)	Raisen		Raisen	23°19′31″N 77°46′23″E	Fort (including walls Gates and other ruins monuments in the fort) More images
N-MP-220	Buddhist monuments	Sanchi		Raisen	23°28′47″N 77°44′25″E	Buddhist monuments More images
N-MP-221	Buddhist stupas with adjucent land	Sonari		Raisen	23°25′56″N 77°39′51″E	Buddhist stupas with adjucent land More images
N-MP-222	Buddhist stupas	Muralkhurd		Raisen	23°25′59″N 77°50′27″E	Buddhist stupas
N-MP-223	Buddhist stupas and remains	Andher		Raisen	23°24′40″N 77°54′26″E	Buddhist stupas and remains More images
N-MP-224	Stupa and other remains	Satdhara		Raisen	23°29′14″N 77°39′06″E	Stupa and other remains More images
N-MP-225	Pre - historic rock shelters	Bhimbetka		Raisen	22°56′19″N 77°36′50″E	Pre - historic rock shelters More images
N-MP-226	Inscriptions	Alhaghat		Rewa	24°52′44″N 81°20′25″E	Upload Photo
N-MP-227	Fresco paintings	Gahir		Rewa	24°23′32″N 81°20′34″E	Upload Photo
N-MP-228	Gurgi & Rohunta remains	Gurgi		Rewa	24°29′43″N 81°25′48″E	Gurgi & Rohunta remains More images
N-MP-229	Inscription in Cave	Keoti		Rewa	24°49′01″N 81°27′24″E	Upload Photo
N-MP-230	Rock Shelters with megaliths, monasteries and inscriptions	Barhat		Rewa	24°56′08″N 81°39′46″E	Rock Shelters with megaliths, monasteries and inscriptions More images
N-MP-231	Shiva Temple	Bamora		Sagar	24°03′20″N 78°05′18″E	Shiva Temple More images
N-MP-232	Fort	Deori Kalan		Sagar	23°23′25″N 79°00′58″E	Upload Photo
N-MP-233	Fort	Dhamoni		Sagar	24°11′30″N 78°46′05″E	Fort More images
N-MP-234	Tomb and Mosque of balijati Shah	Dhamoni		Sagar	24°11′54″N 78°45′21″E	Upload Photo
N-MP-235	Rani Mahal	Dhamoni		Sagar	24°11′28″N 78°46′12″E	Rani Mahal More images
N-MP-236	Ancient site	Eran and Pahlezpur		Sagar	24°05′29″N 78°09′53″E	Ancient site More images
N-MP-237	All structure in or connectuion with the Mahal(fort of the Dangri rulers (Shish Mahal)	Garhpehra		Sagar	23°54′51″N 78°43′01″E	All structure in or connectuion with the Mahal(fort of the Dangri rulers (Shish Mahal) More images
N-MP-238	Fort	Gaurjhamar		Sagar	23°31′28″N 78°56′19″E	Upload Photo
N-MP-239	Temple of Mahadeo or Mata	Karonda		Sagar	24°20′26″N 78°16′04″E	Upload Photo
N-MP-240	Satgarh	Karonda		Sagar	23°53′06″N 78°39′00″E	Upload Photo
N-MP-241	Tomb of Panj pirs	Khimlasa		Sagar	24°12′22″N 78°21′48″E	Tomb of Panj pirs More images
N-MP-242	The walls of the city with gate	Khimlasa		Sagar	24°12′15″N 78°21′49″E	Upload Photo
N-MP-243	The walls of the citaded(fort)	Khimlasa		Sagar	24°12′21″N 78°21′43″E	Upload Photo
N-MP-244	Old Mosque well, gateway of the fort and Nagina Mahal	Khimlasa		Sagar	24°12′22″N 78°21′45″E	Old Mosque well, gateway of the fort and Nagina Mahal More images
N-MP-245	Mahadeva temple	Pali		Sagar	24°06′18″N 78°36′00″E	Upload Photo
N-MP-246	Rahatgarh Fort	Rahatgarh		Sagar	23°46′45″N 78°23′39″E	Rahatgarh Fort
N-MP-246-a	Rahatgarh Fort:Two Gates	Rahatgarh		Sagar	23°46′52″N 78°23′33″E	Upload Photo
N-MP-246-b	Rahatgarh Fort: Moti Mahal	Rahatgarh		Sagar	23°46′52″N 78°23′37″E	Upload Photo
N-MP-246-c	Rahatgarh Fort: Dargah of Gulmali Shah & three graves	Rahatgarh		Sagar	23°46′51″N 78°23′37″E	Upload Photo
N-MP-246-d	Rahatgarh Fort: Shish Mahal	Rahatgarh		Sagar	23°46′45″N 78°23′39″E	Upload Photo
N-MP-246-e	Rahatgarh Fort: Small Mosque	Rahatgarh		Sagar	23°46′51″N 78°23′38″E	Upload Photo
N-MP-246-f	Rahatgarh Fort: Dargah in ruins	Rahatgarh		Sagar		Upload Photo
N-MP-246-g	Rahatgarh Fort: Samadhi	Rahatgarh		Sagar		Upload Photo
N-MP-246-h	Rahatgarh Fort: Dohla tank	Rahatgarh		Sagar	23°46′50″N 78°23′40″E	Upload Photo
N-MP-246-i	Rahatgarh Fort: Ruined Palace	Rahatgarh		Sagar	23°46′40″N 78°23′39″E	Upload Photo
N-MP-246-j	Rahatgarh Fort: Badal Mahal together with adjacent land	Rahatgarh		Sagar	23°46′50″N 78°23′31″E	Upload Photo
N-MP-247	Buddhist Remains	Bharhut		Satna	24°26′49″N 80°50′46″E	Buddhist Remains More images
N-MP-248	Remains (Shiv Temple)	Bhumra		Satna	24°25′42″N 80°38′29″E	Remains (Shiv Temple) More images
N-MP-249	Durga Temple	Ashta		Seoni	21°56′04″N 79°48′53″E	Upload Photo
N-MP-250	Standing Jain Image of Digamber Sect known as Nagbaba and the various fragmentary stone images and architectural stone pieces	Ghansor		Seoni	22°20′47″N 79°47′27″E	Upload Photo
N-MP-251	Karna Temple	Amarkantak		Anuppur	22°40′16″N 81°45′29″E	Karna Temple More images
N-MP-252	Siva Temple	Amarkantak		Anuppur	22°40′18″N 81°45′31″E	Siva Temple More images
N-MP-253	Pataleswara Temple	Amarkantak		Anuppur	22°40′17″N 81°45′32″E	Pataleswara Temple More images
N-MP-254	Caves bearing inscriptions of last Century AD	Silhara		Anuppur	23°08′17″N 81°57′52″E	Caves bearing inscriptions of last Century AD More images
N-MP-255	Virateshwar (Virat Temple) and remains	Sohagpur		Shahdol	23°19′14″N 81°21′32″E	Virateshwar (Virat Temple) and remains
N-MP-266	Siva temple& Monastery	Chandrehi		Sidhi	24°17′27″N 81°27′53″E	Siva temple& Monastery More images
N-MP-272	Bijamandal Temple / Mosque	Vidisha		Vidisha	23°31′43″N 77°48′04″E	Bijamandal Temple / Mosque More images
N-MP-273	Lohanji Hill Column Capital	Vidisha		Vidisha	23°31′37″N 77°48′52″E	Lohanji Hill Column Capital
N-MP-274	Dashavatara temple	Badoh		Vidisha	23°55′25″N 78°13′32″E	Dashavatara temple More images
N-MP-275	Pathari Jain temples	Badoh		Vidisha	23°55′25″N 78°13′12″E	Pathari Jain temples More images
N-MP-276	Devi temple	Badoh		Vidisha	23°55′06″N 78°13′21″E	Devi temple More images
N-MP-277	Ancient Site	Besnagar		Vidisha	23°32′57″N 77°47′59″E	Ancient Site
N-MP-278	Heliodours Pillars locally known as Khamba Baba or Kham Baba	Besnagar		Vidisha	23°32′58″N 77°48′00″E	Heliodours Pillars locally known as Khamba Baba or Kham Baba More images
N-MP-279	Athakamba temple	Gyaraspur		Vidisha	23°39′59″N 78°06′41″E	Athakamba temple More images
N-MP-280	Hindu/Jain Temple	Gyaraspur		Vidisha	23°39′45″N 78°06′42″E	Hindu/Jain Temple More images
N-MP-281	Hindola torans	Gyaraspur		Vidisha	23°40′00″N 78°06′57″E	Hindola torans More images
N-MP-282	Buddhist stupa	Gyaraspur		Vidisha	23°39′54″N 78°05′54″E	Buddhist stupa More images
N-MP-283	Maladevi Temple	Gyaraspur		Vidisha	23°39′31″N 78°06′49″E	Maladevi Temple More images
N-MP-284	Bhimagaja	Pathari		Vidisha	23°56′11″N 78°13′16″E	Bhimagaja More images
N-MP-285	Saptmatrika Caves	Pathari		Vidisha	23°55′32″N 78°12′43″E	Saptmatrika Caves More images
N-MP-286	Caves No. 1 to 20	Udaygiri		Vidisha	23°32′24″N 77°46′19″E	Caves No. 1 to 20 More images
N-MP-287	Ruins of a Gupta temple on hill top	Udaygiri		Vidisha	23°32′22″N 77°46′17″E	Ruins of a Gupta temple on hill top More images
N-MP-288	Bara Khambi	Udaypur, Madhya Pradesh		Vidisha	23°53′53″N 78°03′40″E	Upload Photo
N-MP-289	Udayeswara or Nilkantheswara Mahadeva Temple.	Udaypur, Madhya Pradesh		Vidisha	23°54′02″N 78°03′26″E	Udayeswara or Nilkantheswara Mahadeva Temple. More images

NOTE: For all the Monuments whose coordinates are listed above; Images posted by visitors are available on Google Map.

== See also ==
- Madhya Pradesh/West remainder of divided list of Monuments in Madhya Pradesh
- Lists of monuments in India - for other Monuments of National Importance in India
- Other Historic Heritage sites of Madhya Pradesh
