= Religious World Heritage Sites =

This is an unofficial list of UNESCO World Heritage Sites around the world by the religion they are associated with. While some sites have had their religious affiliation changed at various points throughout history, this list categorizes sites by their most recent affiliation. Also, not all of the following sites are functioning as places of worship. UNESCO does not endorse classification by religion, which would be inconsistent with the universal value of these sites as "world heritage".

== Buddhist World Heritage Sites ==
=== Historical Buddhist sites ===
- Ajanta Caves, India
- Ancient City of Polonnaruwa, Sri Lanka
- Ancient City of Sigiriya, Sri Lanka
- Angkor Wat, Cambodia
- Nalanda mahavihara, Bihar, India
- Baekje Historic Areas, South Korea
  - Jeongnimsa Temple
  - Mireuksa Temple
- Borobudur Temple Compounds, Indonesia
- Buddhist Monuments at Sanchi, India
- Buddhist Ruins of Takht-i-Bahi and Neighbouring City Remains at Sahr-i-Bahlol, Pakistan
- Cultural Landscape and Archaeological Remains of the Bamiyan Valley, Afghanistan
- Dazu Rock Carvings, China
- Elephanta Caves, India
- Ellora Caves, India
- Historic City of Ayutthaya, Thailand
- Longmen Grottoes, China
- Lumbini, the Birthplace of the Lord Buddha, Nepal
- Mahabodhi Temple Complex at Bodh Gaya, India
- Mogao Caves, China
- Pyu Ancient Cities, Myanmar
- Sarnath, India
- Ruins of the Buddhist Vihara at Paharpur, Bangladesh
- Silk Roads: the Routes Network of Chang'an-Tianshan Corridor, China
  - Bin County Cave Temple
  - Bingling Cave Temple Complex
  - Giant Wild Goose Pagoda
  - Kizil Cave Temple Complex
  - Maijishan Cave Temple Complex
  - Small Wild Goose Pagoda
  - Subash Buddhist Ruins
  - Xingjiao Temple
- Taxila, Pakistan
- Yungang Grottoes, China

=== Eastern Buddhist (East Asian Mahayana) Sites ===
- Ancient City of Ping Yao, China
  - Shuang Lin Temple
  - Zhenguo Temple
- Buddhist Monuments in the Hōryū-ji Area, Japan
- Haeinsa Temple Janggyeong Panjeon, the Depositories for the Tripitaka Koreana Woodblocks, South Korea
- Hiraizumi – Temples, Gardens and Archaeological Sites Representing the Buddhist Pure Land, Japan
- Historic Monuments of Ancient Kyoto (Kyoto, Uji and Otsu Cities), Japan
  - Byōdō-in
  - Daigo-ji
  - Enryaku-ji
  - Kinkaku-ji
  - Kiyomizu-dera
  - Kōzan-ji
  - Ninna-ji
  - Nishi Hongan-ji
  - Ryōan-ji
  - Saihō-ji
  - Tō-ji
- Historic Monuments of Ancient Nara, Japan
  - Gangō-ji
  - Kōfuku-ji
  - Tōdai-ji
  - Tōshōdai-ji
  - Yakushi-ji
- Historic Monuments of Dengfeng in 'The Centre of Heaven and Earth, China
- Lushan National Park, China
- Mount Emei Scenic Area, including Leshan Giant Buddha Scenic Area, China
- Mount Wutai, China
- Mountain Resort and its Outlying Temples, Chengde
- Quanzhou: Emporium of the World in Song-Yuan China, China
  - Kaiyuan Temple
  - Liusheng Pagoda
- Seokguram Grotto and Bulguksa Temple, South Korea
- Sacred Sites and Pilgrimage Routes in the Kii Mountain Range, Japan
  - Fudarakusan-ji
  - Kimpusen-ji
  - Mount Kōya
  - Seiganto-ji
- Sansa, Buddhist Mountain Monasteries in Korea
- Shrines and Temples of Nikkō, Japan
  - Rinnō-ji
- Tràng An Scenic Landscape Complex

=== Northern Buddhist (Indo-Tibetan) Sites ===
- Historic Ensemble of the Potala Palace, Lhasa, China
- Kathmandu Valley, Nepal
  - Boudhanath
  - Swayambhu
- Orkhon Valley Cultural Landscape, Mongolia
  - Erdene Zuu Monastery
  - Shankh Monastery

=== Southern Buddhist (Theravada) Sites ===
- Bagan, Myanmar
- Rangiri Dambulla Cave Temple, Sri Lanka
- Sacred City of Anuradhapura, Sri Lanka
- Sacred City of Kandy, Sri Lanka

== Christian World Heritage Sites ==
=== Catholic Sites ===
- Aachen Cathedral, Germany
- Abbey and Altenmünster of Lorsch, Germany
- Abbey Church of Saint-Savin sur Gartempe, France
- Amiens Cathedral, France
- Arab-Norman Palermo and the Cathedral Churches of Cefalù and Monreale, Italy
- Archaeological Area and the Patriarchal Basilica of Aquileia, Italy
- Assisi, the Basilica of San Francesco and Other Franciscan Sites, Italy
- Baroque Churches of the Philippines, Philippines
- Benedictine Convent of St John at Müstair, Switzerland
- Bourges Cathedral, France
- Burgos Cathedral, Spain
- Carolingian Westwork and Civitas Corvey, Germany
- Catalan Romanesque Churches of the Vall de Boí, Spain
- Cathedral, Alcázar and Archivo de Indias in Seville, Spain
- Cathedral of Notre-Dame, Former Abbey of Saint-Rémi and Palace of Tau, Reims, France
- Cathedral, Torre Civica and Piazza Grande, Modena, Italy
- Chartres Cathedral, France
- Hidden Christian Sites in the Nagasaki Region, Japan
- Church and Dominican Convent of Santa Maria delle Grazie with "The Last Supper" by Leonardo da Vinci, Italy
- Churches of Chiloé, Chile
- Cistercian Abbey of Fontenay, France
- Cologne Cathedral, Germany
- Convent of Christ in Tomar, Portugal
- Convent of St Gall, Switzerland
- Early Christian Monuments of Ravenna, Italy
- Episcopal Complex of the Euphrasian Basilica in the Historic Centre of Poreč, Croatia
- Historic Centre of Avignon: Papal Palace, Episcopal Ensemble and Avignon Bridge, France
- Historic Centre of Rome, the Properties of the Holy See in that City Enjoying Extraterritorial Rights, and San Paolo Fuori le Mura, Italy and Vatican City
- Jesuit Missions of Chiquitos, Bolivia
- Jesuit Missions of the Guaranis: San Ignacio Miní, Santa Ana, Nuestra Señora de Loreto and Santa María Mayor (Argentina), Ruins of São Miguel das Missões (Brazil)
- Jesuit Missions of La Santísima Trinidad de Paraná and Jesús de Tavarangue, Paraguay
- Late Baroque Churches of the Val di Noto, Italy
- León Cathedral, Nicaragua
- Maulbronn Monastery, Germany
- Monastic Island of Reichenau, Germany
- Monastery and Site of the Escorial, Madrid, Spain
- Monastery of Alcobaça, Portugal
- Monastery of Batalha, Portugal
- Monastery of the Hieronymites and Tower of Belém in Lisbon, Portugal
- Notre-Dame Cathedral in Tournai, Belgium
- Old Town of Ávila with its Extra-Muros Churches, Spain
- Piazza del Duomo, Pisa, Italy
- Pilgrimage Church of Wies, Germany
- Poblet Monastery, Spain
- Protective town of San Miguel de Allende and the Sanctuary of Jesús Nazareno de Atotonilco, Mexico
- Roman Monuments, Cathedral of St Peter and Church of Our Lady in Trier, Germany
- Routes of Santiago de Compostela: Camino Francés and Routes of Northern Spain, Spain
- Routes of Santiago de Compostela in France, France
- Monastery of Santa María de Guadalupe, Spain
- Sacri Monti of Piedmont and Lombardy, Italy
- San Antonio Missions, United States
- Sanctuary of Bom Jesus do Congonhas, Brazil
- Sanctuary of Bom Jesus do Monte in Braga, Portugal
- San Millán Yuso and Suso Monasteries, Spain
- Santhome Church in Chennai, India
- Sceilg Mhichíl, Ireland
- Speyer Cathedral, Germany
- St Mary's Cathedral and St Michael's Church at Hildesheim, Germany (Note: The main church building of St. Michael's Church is Lutheran, while the crypt is Catholic.)
- Studley Royal Park including the Ruins of Fountains Abbey, United Kingdom
- Šibenik Cathedral, Croatia
- The Sassi and the Park of the Rupestrian Churches of Matera, Italy
- Vatican City
- Vézelay, Church and Hill, France
- Iglesia de Atlántida Cristo Obrero y Nuestra Señora de Lourdes, Uruguay
- Basílica de la Sagrada Familia, Spain

=== Eastern Orthodox Sites ===
- Gelati Monastery, Georgia
- Historical Monuments of Mtskheta, Georgia
- Medieval Monuments in Kosovo, Serbia and Kosovo
- Monasteries of Daphni, Hosios Loukas and Nea Moni of Chios, Greece
- Mount Athos, Greece
- Paleochristian and Byzantine Monuments of Thessalonika, Greece
- Studenica Monastery, Serbia
- The Historic Centre (Chorá) with the Monastery of Saint-John the Theologian and the Cave of the Apocalypse on the Island of Pátmos

=== Protestant Sites ===
- Canterbury Cathedral, St Augustine's Abbey, and St Martin's Church, United Kingdom
- Christiansfeld, a Moravian Church Settlement, Denmark
- Durham Castle and Cathedral, United Kingdom
- Church Village of Gammelstad, Luleå, Sweden
- Naumburg Cathedral, Germany
- Petäjävesi Old Church, Finland
- Roskilde Cathedral, Denmark
- Urnes Stave Church, Norway
- St Mary's Cathedral and St Michael's Church at Hildesheim, Germany (Note: The main church building of St. Michael's Church is Lutheran, while the crypt is Catholic.)

== Hindu World Heritage Sites ==
- Angkor Wat, Cambodia
- Pashupatinath Temple, Nepal
- Muktinath Temple, Nepal
- Guhyeshwari Temple, Nepal
- Gadhimai Temple, Nepal
- Airavatesvara Temple
- Anegundi
- Brihadisvara Temple, Gangaikonda Cholapuram
- Brihadisvara Temple, Thanjavur
- Chaturbhuj Temple (Khajuraho)
- Devi Jagadambi Temple
- Duladeo Temple
- Elephanta Caves
- Ellora Caves
- Great Living Chola Temples
- Group of Monuments at Mahabalipuram
- Hampi
- Javari Temple, Khajuraho
- Kailasa temple, Ellora
- Khajuraho Group of Monuments
- Konark Sun Temple
- Lakshmana Temple, Khajuraho
- Lakshmi Temple, Khajuraho
- Mamallapuram
- Nanda Devi
- Nandi Temple, Khajuraho India
- Parvati Temple, Khajuraho
- Pattadakal
- Prambanan
- Vamana Temple, Khajuraho
- Varaha Temple, Khajuraho
- Category:Hampi

== Muslim World Heritage Sites ==
- Al Qal'a of Beni Hammad, Algeria
- Casbah of Algiers, Algeria
- Minaret and Archaeological Remains of Jam, Afghanistan
- Mosque City of Bagerhat, Bangladesh
- Sudanese style mosques in northern Côte d’Ivoire, Côte d’Ivoire
- Islamic Cairo, Egypt
- Harar Jugol, Ethiopia
- Qutb Minar, India
- Taj Mahal, India
- Jameh Mosque of Isfahan, Iran
- Samarra Archaeological City, Iraq
- Quseir Amra, Jordan
- Mausoleum of Khoja Ahmed Yasawi, Kazakhstan
- Lamu Old Town, Kenya
- Sulaiman-Too Sacred Mountain, Kyrgyzstan
- Anjar, Lebanon
- Great Mosque of Djenné, Mali
- Timbuktu, Mali
- Tomb of Askia, Mali
- Ancient Ksour of Ouadane, Chinguetti, Tichitt and Oualata, Mauritania
- Historic City of Meknes, Morocco
- Medina of Fez, Morocco
- Medina of Marrakesh, Morocco
- Medina of Tétouan, Morocco
- Qalhat, Oman
- Bahla Fort, Oman
- Fort and Shalamar Gardens in Lahore, Pakistan
- Historical Monuments at Makli, Thatta, Pakistan
- Rohtas Fort, Pakistan
- Al-Ahsa Oasis, Saudi Arabia
- Al Zubarah, Qatar
- At-Turaif District in ad-Dir'iyah, Saudi Arabia
- Historic Jeddah, Saudi Arabia
- Ancient City of Aleppo, Syria
- Ancient City of Damascus, Syria
- Ancient City of Bosra, Syria
- Kairouan, Tunisia
- Medina of Tunis, Tunisia
- Medina of Sousse, Tunisia
- Selimiye Mosque and its Social Complex, Turkey
- Kunya-Urgench, Turkmenistan
- Itchan Kala, Uzbekistan
- Historic Centre of Bukhara, Uzbekistan
- Historic Centre of Shakhrisyabz, Uzbekistan
- Samarkand, Uzbekistan
- Old Walled City of Shibam, Yemen
- Historic Town of Zabid, Yemen
