= Shakti temple =

Hindu temple

Shakti temple is a Hindu temple where the presiding deity is Shakti.

== Forms ==
The following are some of the forms of Shakti appearing mainly in temples:

- Durga in Durga Mandir, Varanasi
- Bhagavathi in Attukal Temple
- Bhadrakali in Bhadrakali Temple, Warangal
- Devi in Azhakodi Devi Temple
- Lakshmi in Lakshmi Temple, Khajuraho
- Parvati in Parvati Temple, Khajuraho
- Saraswati in Saraswati Temple, Wargal
