= Chaturbhuj Temple =

Chaturbhuj Temple may refer to one of a number of temples in India dedicated to chaturbhuja (four-armed) deities:

- Chaturbhuj Temple, Khajuraho, the temple at Khajuraho in Madhya Pradesh
- Chaturbhuj Temple, Orchha, the temple located at Orchha in Madhya Pradesh
- Chaturbhuj Temple, Gwalior, the temple at Gwalior Fort, Madhya Pradesh
