= Matangeshvara Temple, Khajuraho =

10th-century Shiva temple

Matangeshvara temple
- मतंगेश्वर मन्दिर
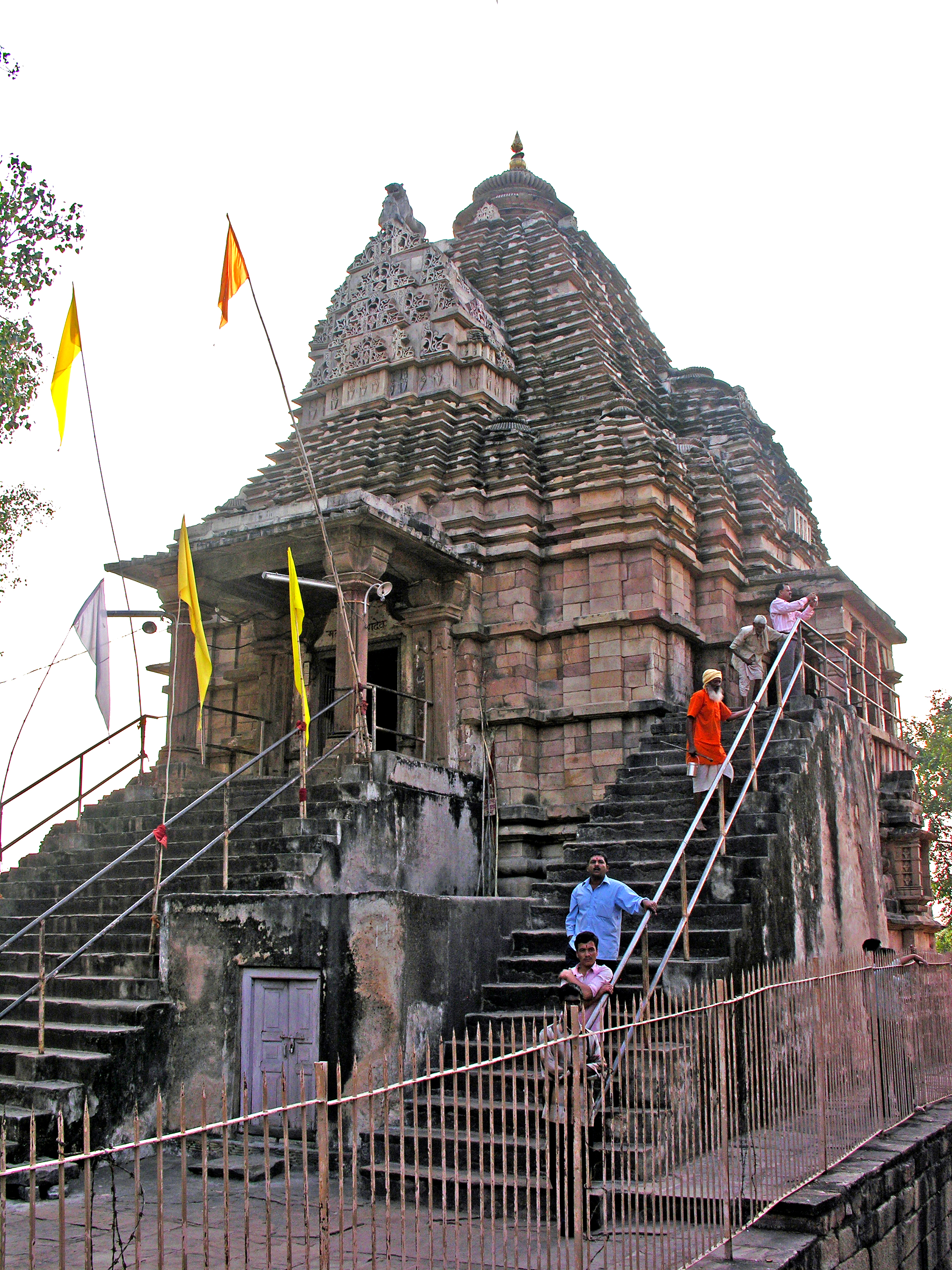

- Location in Madhya Pradesh, India Matangeshvara Temple, Khajuraho (India)

Religion
- Affiliation: Shaivism
- District: Chhatarpur
- Deity: Matangeshvara (an aspect of Shiva)

Location
- Location: Khajuraho
- State: Madhya Pradesh
- Country: India
- Interactive map of Matangeshvara temple
- Coordinates: 24.8519316°N 79.9216873°E

Architecture
- Established: 11th century CE

The Matangeshvara temple (IAST: Matangeśvara Mandir) is a Shiva temple in the Khajuraho town of Madhya Pradesh, India. Among the Chandela-era monuments of Khajuraho, it is the only Hindu temple that is still actively used for worship. As part of the Khajuraho Group of Monuments, the temple was inscribed on the UNESCO World Heritage List in 1986 because of its art, architecture, and testimony to the Chandela culture.

== History ==
The Archaeological Survey of India (ASI) assigns the Matangeshvara temple to 900-925 CE, because it has a plain design unlike the later temples of Khajuraho. However, scholar Rana P. B. Singh assigned it to approximately 1000 CE.

The temple has been classified as a Monument of National Importance by the ASI.

According to the history, a sage named Matanga manifested in form of a lingam, and controlled the god of love. His hermitages were located at Khajuraho, Kedarnath, Varanasi and Gaya. These are now the sites of four Matangeshvara ("Lord of Matanga") temples. Another account states that the temple is named after an aspect of Shiva who controlled the god of love.

== Art and architecture ==
The Matangeshvara temple is a larger-scale version of the Brahma temple in terms of plan and design. It has a square plan. It houses a 2.5 m high lingam, which is 1.1 m in diameter. The base platform of the lingam is 1.2 m high and 7.6 m in diameter. The lingam has Nagari and Persian inscriptions.

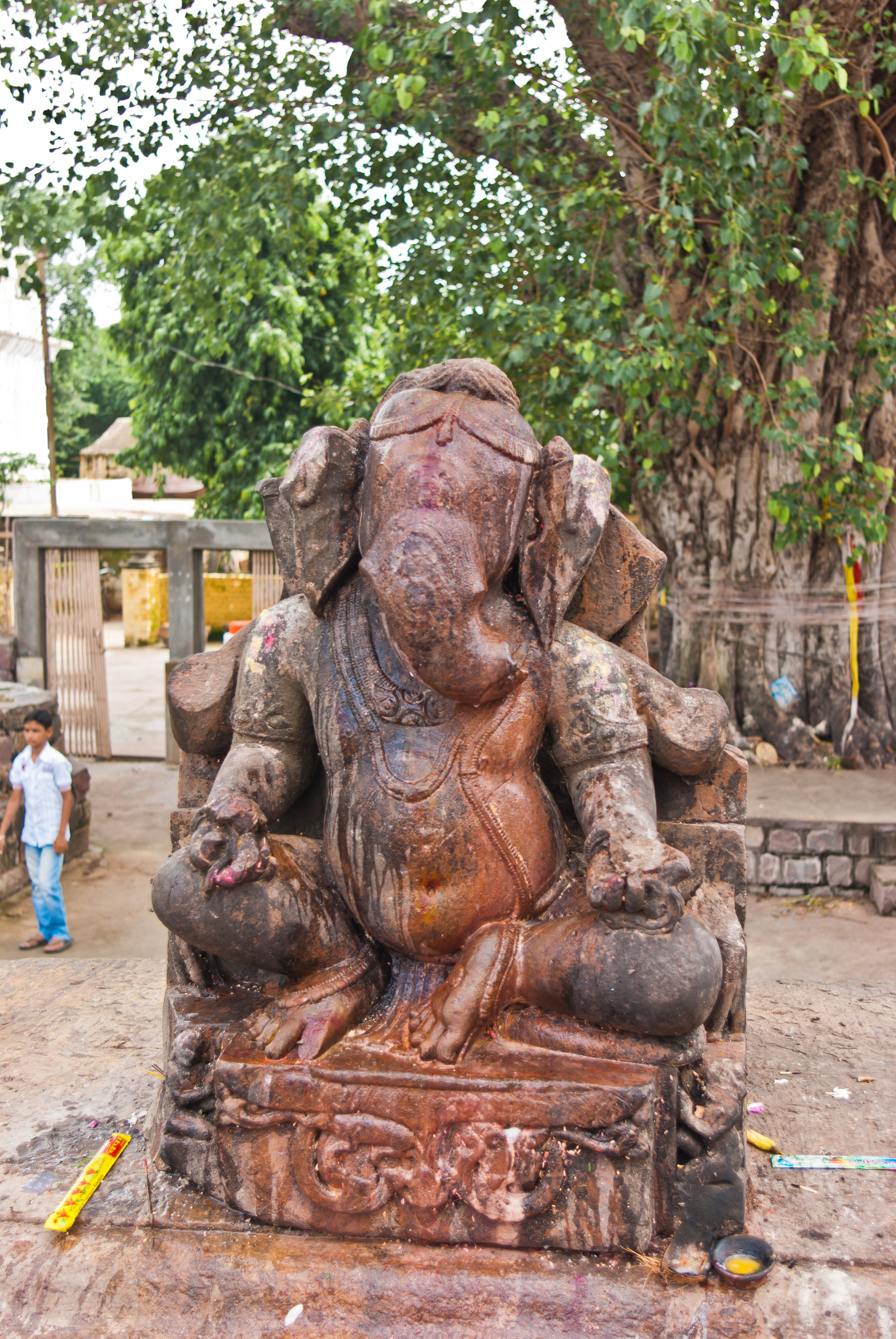
Ganesha statue at the entrance

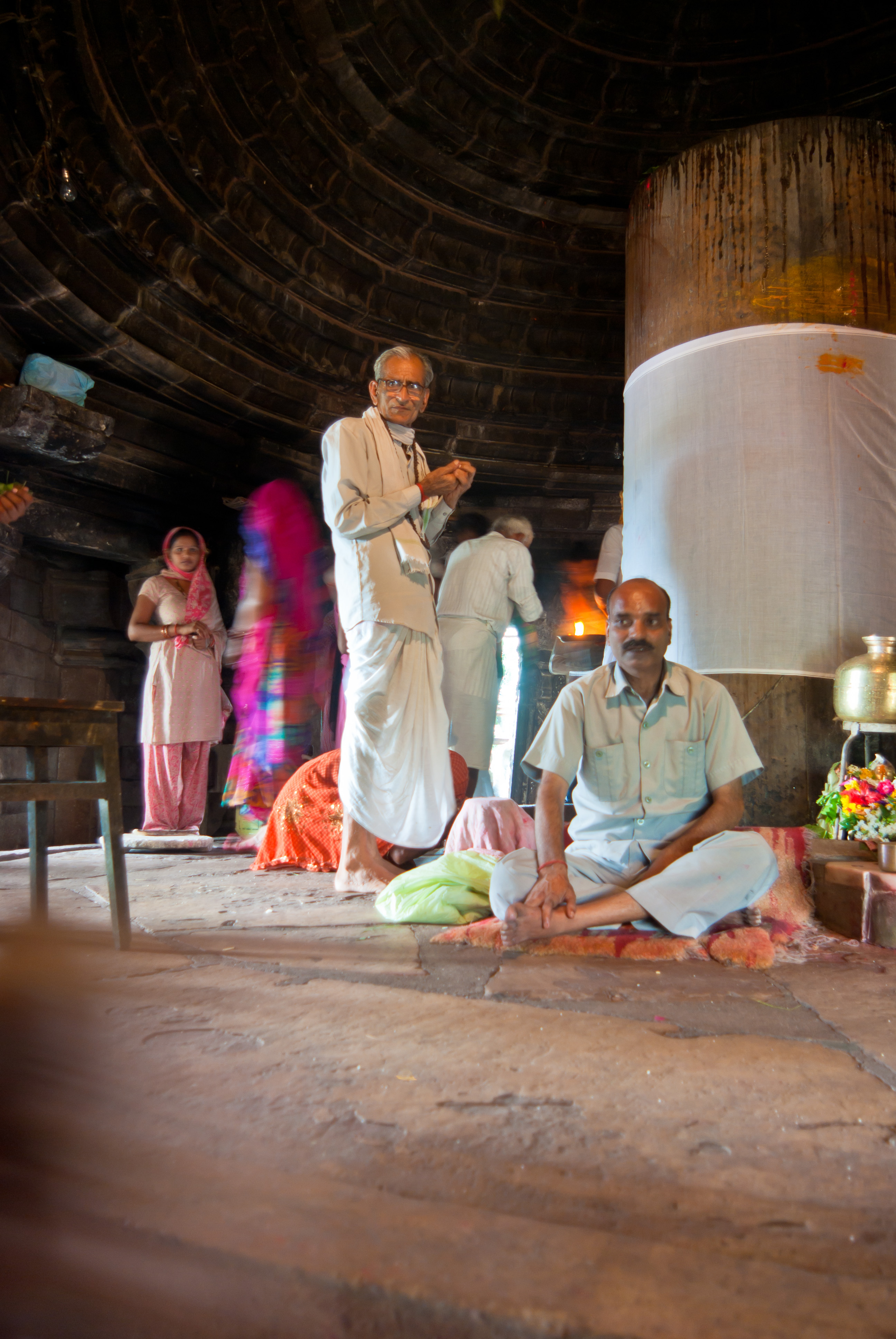
The interior of the temple

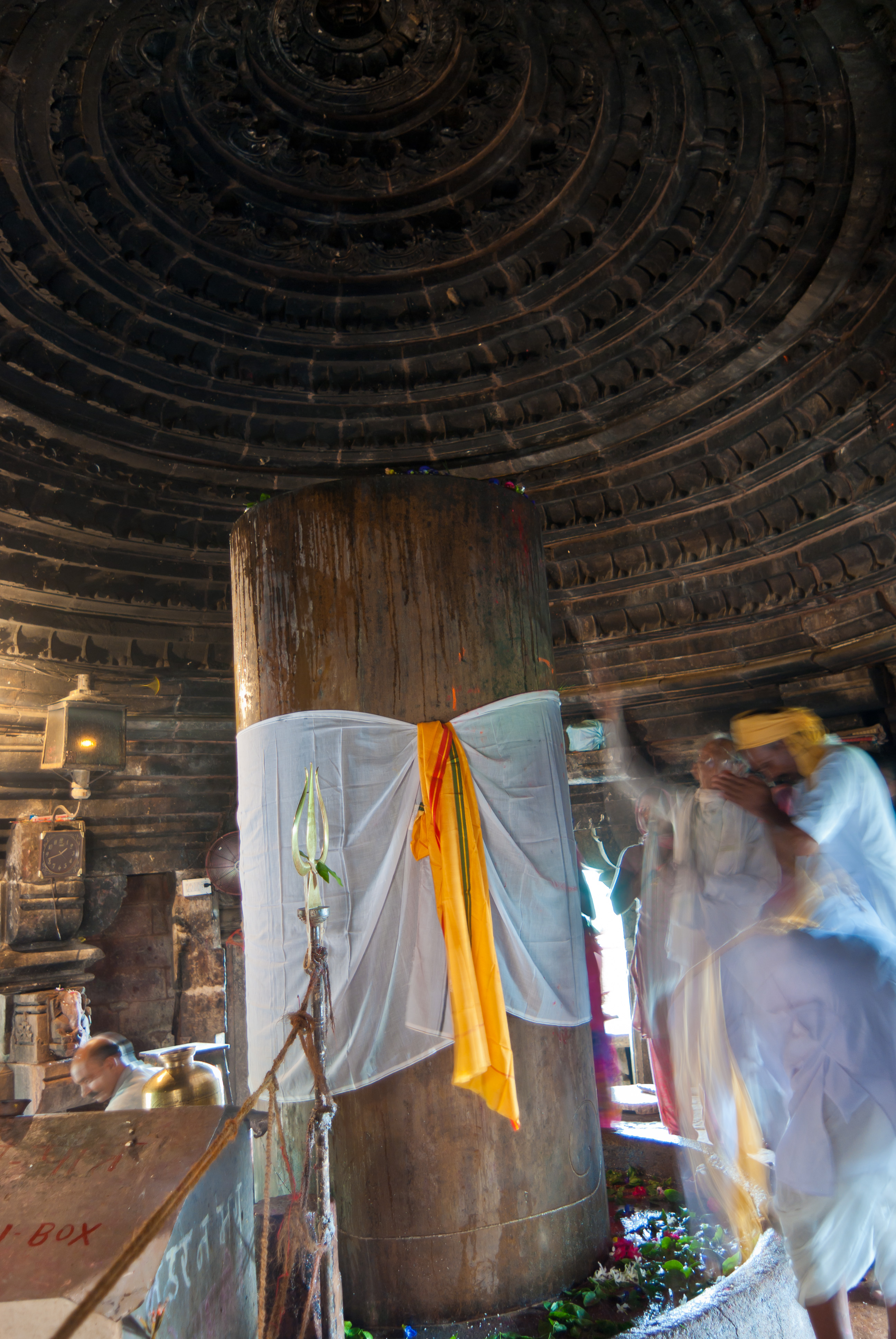
Ceiling cusps

The Matangesvara temple is the plainest looking among the sandstone temples of Khajuraho. It is not richly decorated: its interior walls, exterior walls and curvilinear tower are devoid of carvings. The ceiling features elementary floral cusps.

== Present use ==
Among the Hindu temples of Khajuraho, the Matangeshvara temple is the only widely active site of worship. Around Shivaratri in February or March, a three-day ceremony is organized here to celebrate Shiva's marriage. It is attended by around 25,000 people. The lingam is bathed, dressed and decorated like a human bridegroom during the ceremony.
