= Javari Temple, Khajuraho =

Javari Temple
- जावरी मंदिर
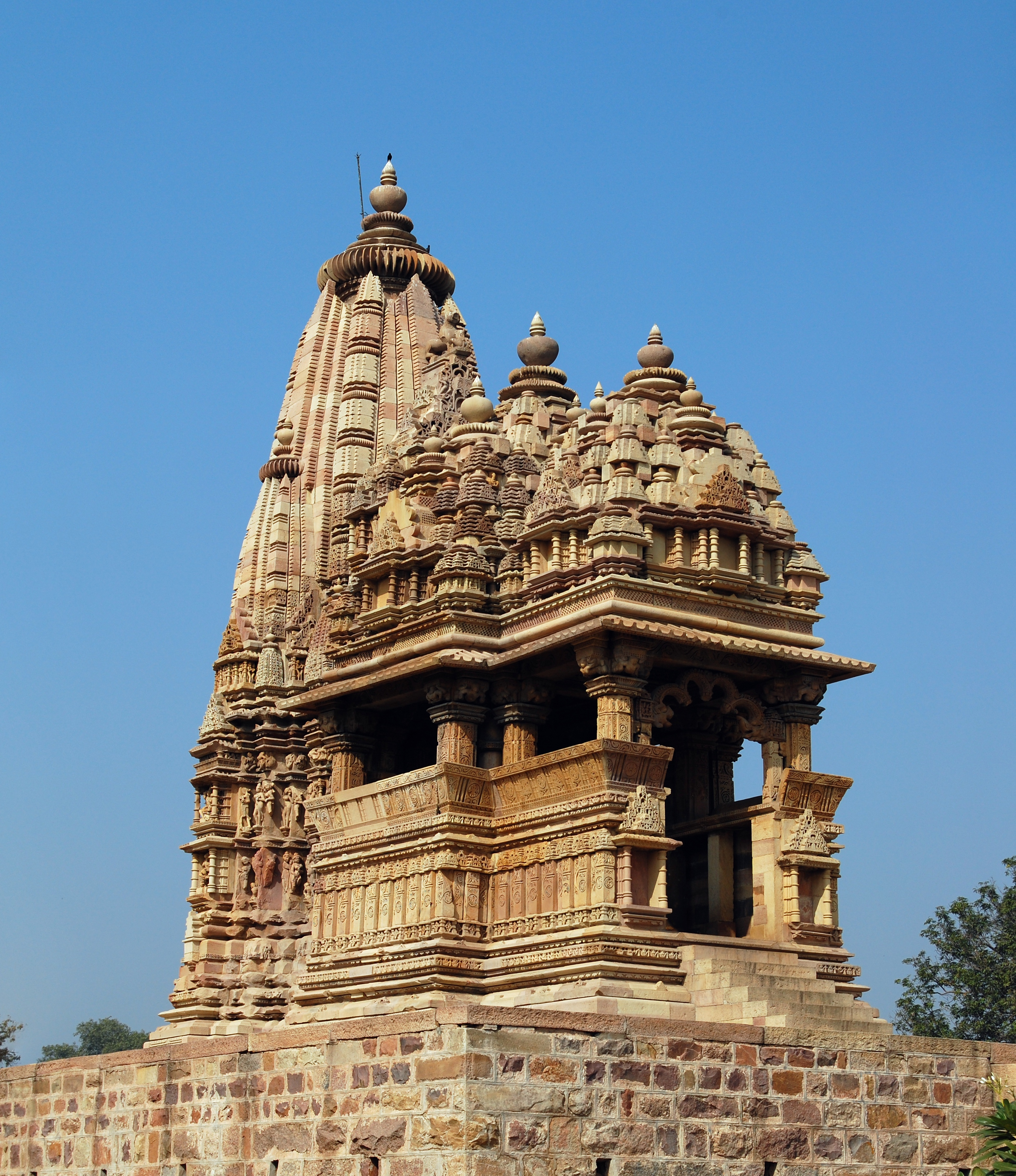
- Javari temple at Khajuraho

Religion
- Affiliation: Hinduism
- District: Chattarpur, Khajuraho
- Deity: Shiva

Location
- Location: Khajuraho
- State: Madhya Pradesh
- Country: India
- Interactive map of Javari Temple
- Coordinates: 24°51′11″N 79°55′10″E

Architecture
- Creator: Chandella Rulers
- Completed: C. 975 and 1100 A.D.
- Temple: 1

The Javari Temple in Khajuraho, India, is a Hindu temple, which forms part of the Khajuraho Group of Monuments, a UNESCO World Heritage Site. It was built between c. 975 and 1100 A.D.

The temple is dedicated to the Hindu deity Shiva. The main idol of the temple is broken and headless(see image).

== Location ==
The temple is located in the eastern area of Khajuraho. It is near to and visible from Vamana Temple, and at a distance of about 200 meters (south) from it.

== Architecture ==
It has well-proportioned architecture, with a sanctum, vestibule, mandapa and portico, but without pradakshinapatha. It has remable Makara Torana (Capricorn Arch) and shikhara (top). It has three bands of carved sculptures on the outer wall. The temple has a close resemblance with Chaturbhuja Temple, also at Khajuraho.

=== Main idol ===
The main idol (of Vishnu) of the temple is broken and headless.

=== Makara (Capricorn) Arch ===
Temple has a beautiful Makara (Capricorn) Arch at the entrance porch (also seen in image).

=== Entrance of sanctum ===
The entrance gate of sanctum has sculptures depicting nava-graha on the top. Along with nava-graha sculptures, sculpture of the Hindu deities Brahma, Vishnu and Shiva can also be seen.

=== Sculptures ===
The temple has two bands of sculpture on the outer wall (see image).

== Gallery ==
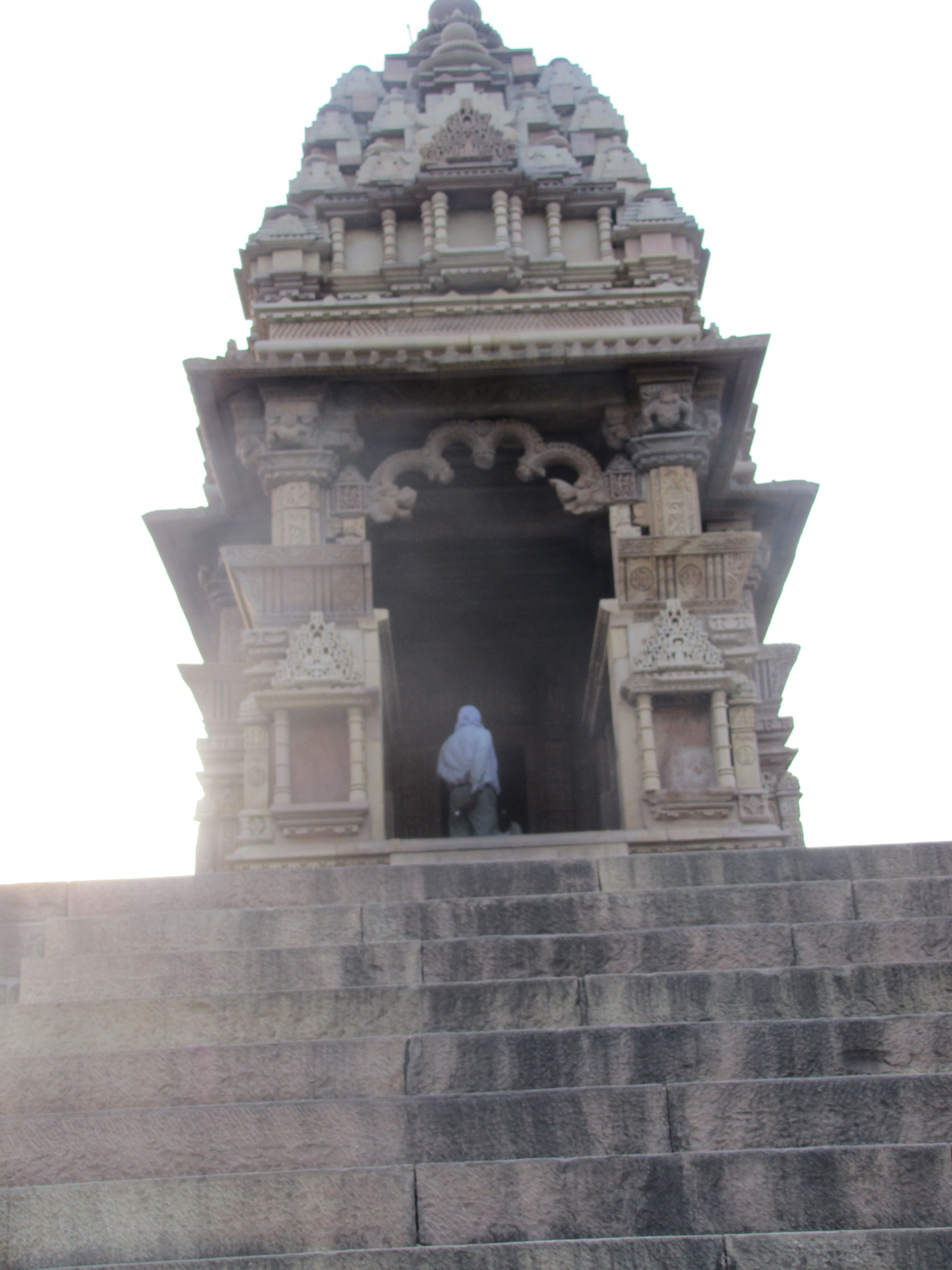

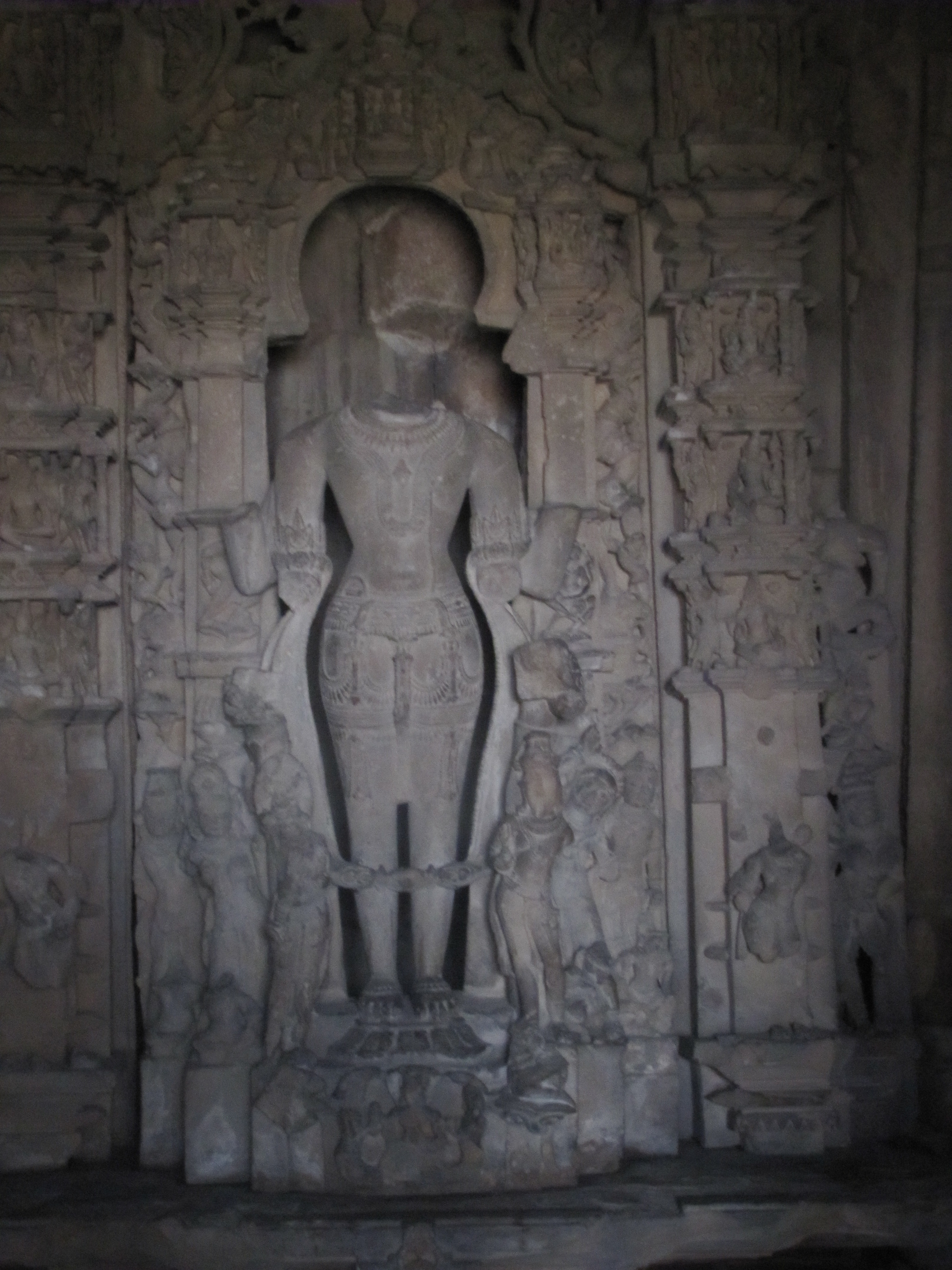
Main Idol

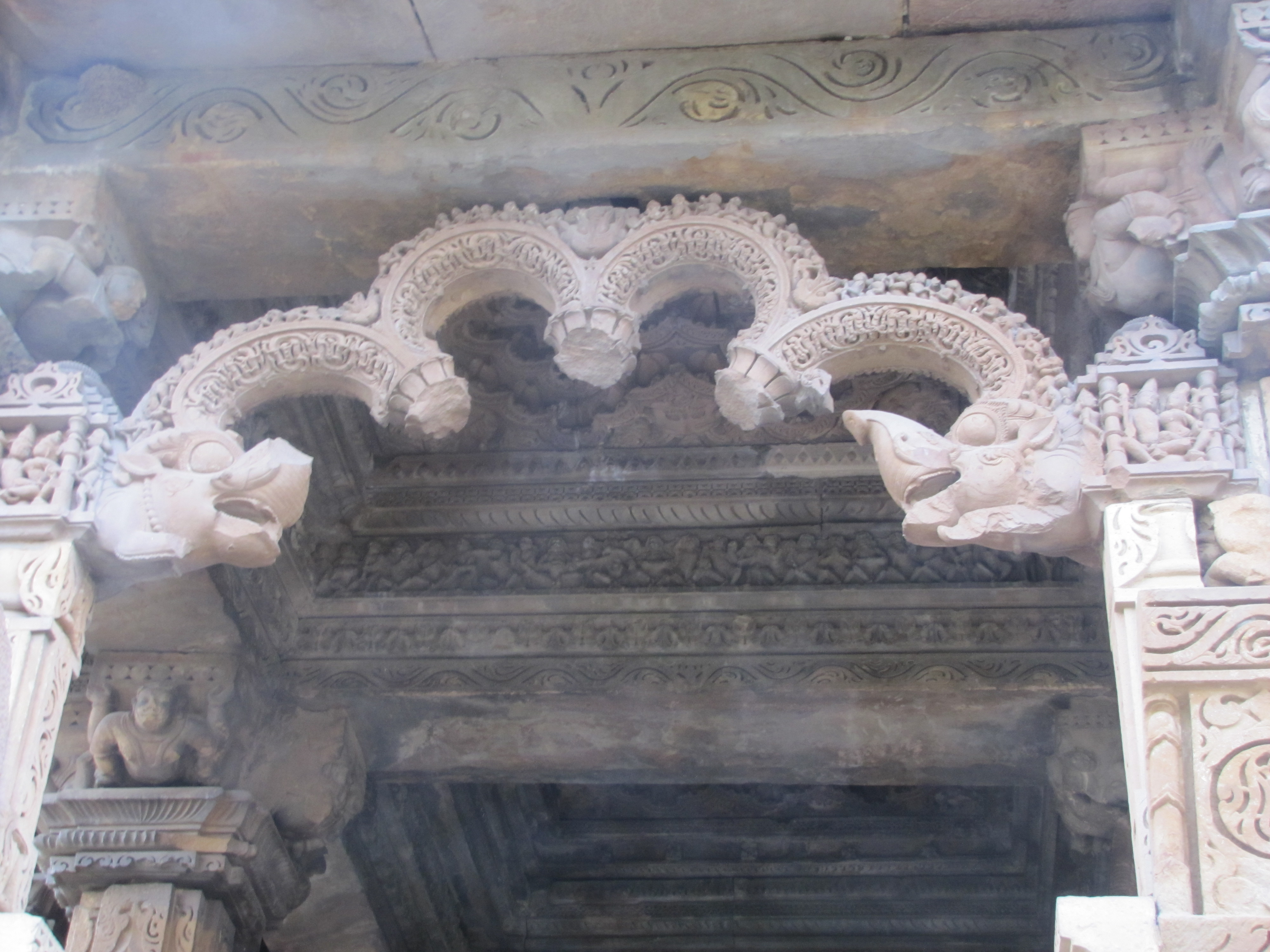
Makar (Capricorn) Arch

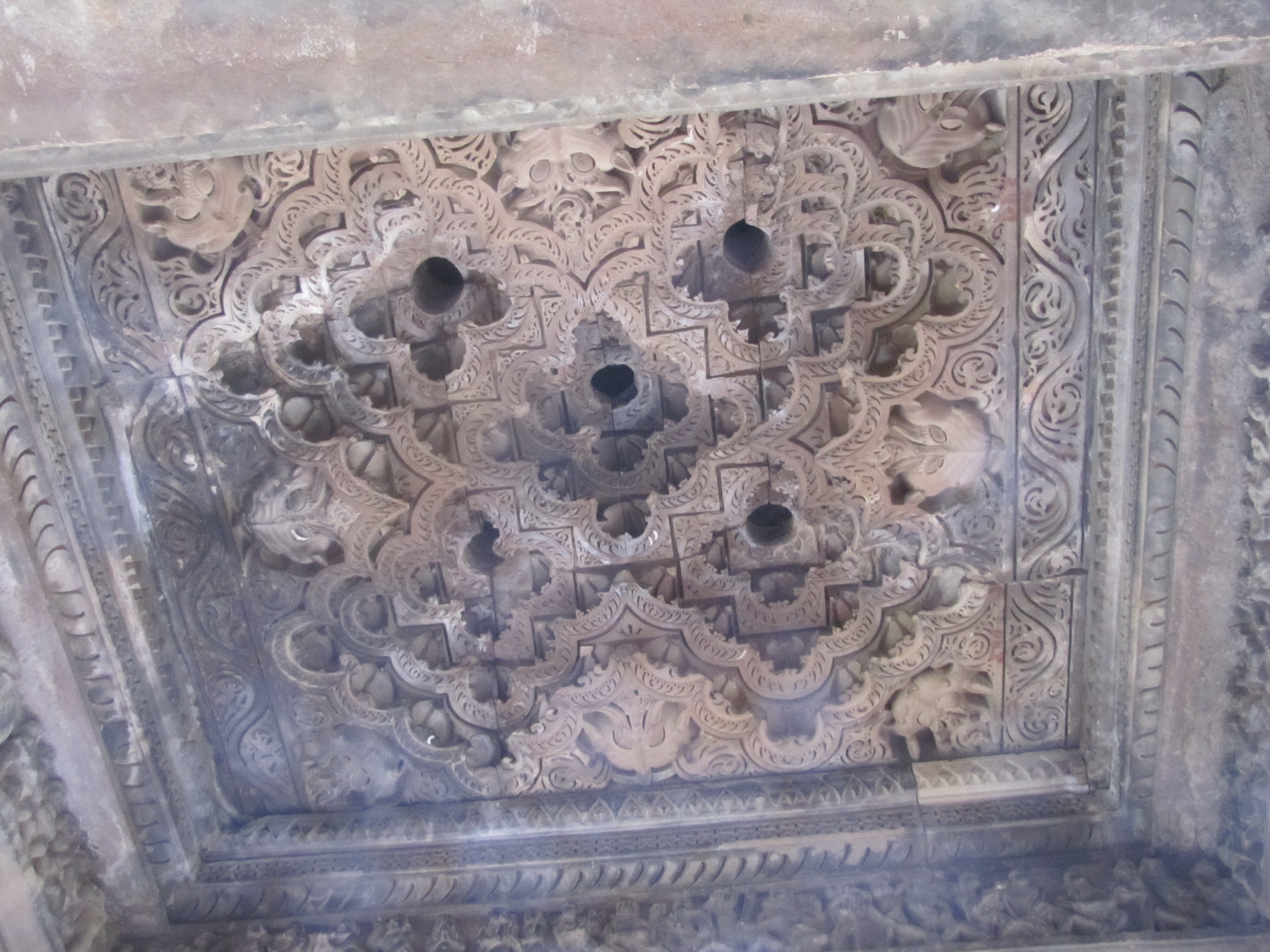
Roof of the Temple
