= Khimlasa =

Town in Madhya Pradesh, India

Coordinates: 24.2048°N 78.3643°E

- Town
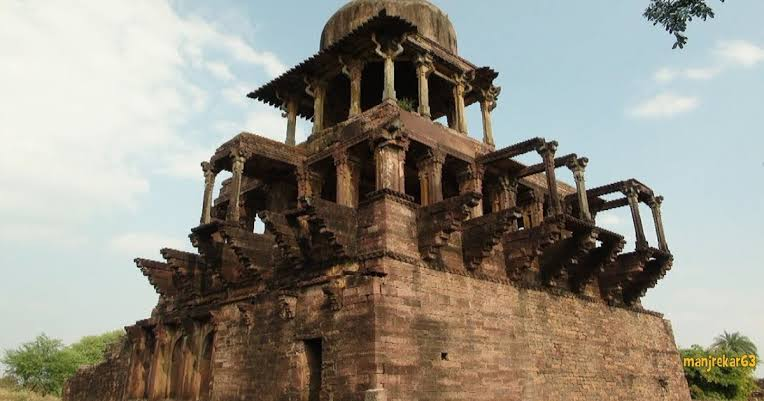
- Fort of Khimlasa
- Interactive map of Khimlasa
- Country: India
- State: Madhya Pradesh
- District: Sagar

Government
  - Type: Gram Panchayat

Population (2011)
  - Total: 10,333
- Vehicle registration: MP 15

Khimlasa is a town in Sagar District, Madhya Pradesh, India. It's known for his historical fort, It is currently in Khurai tehsil.

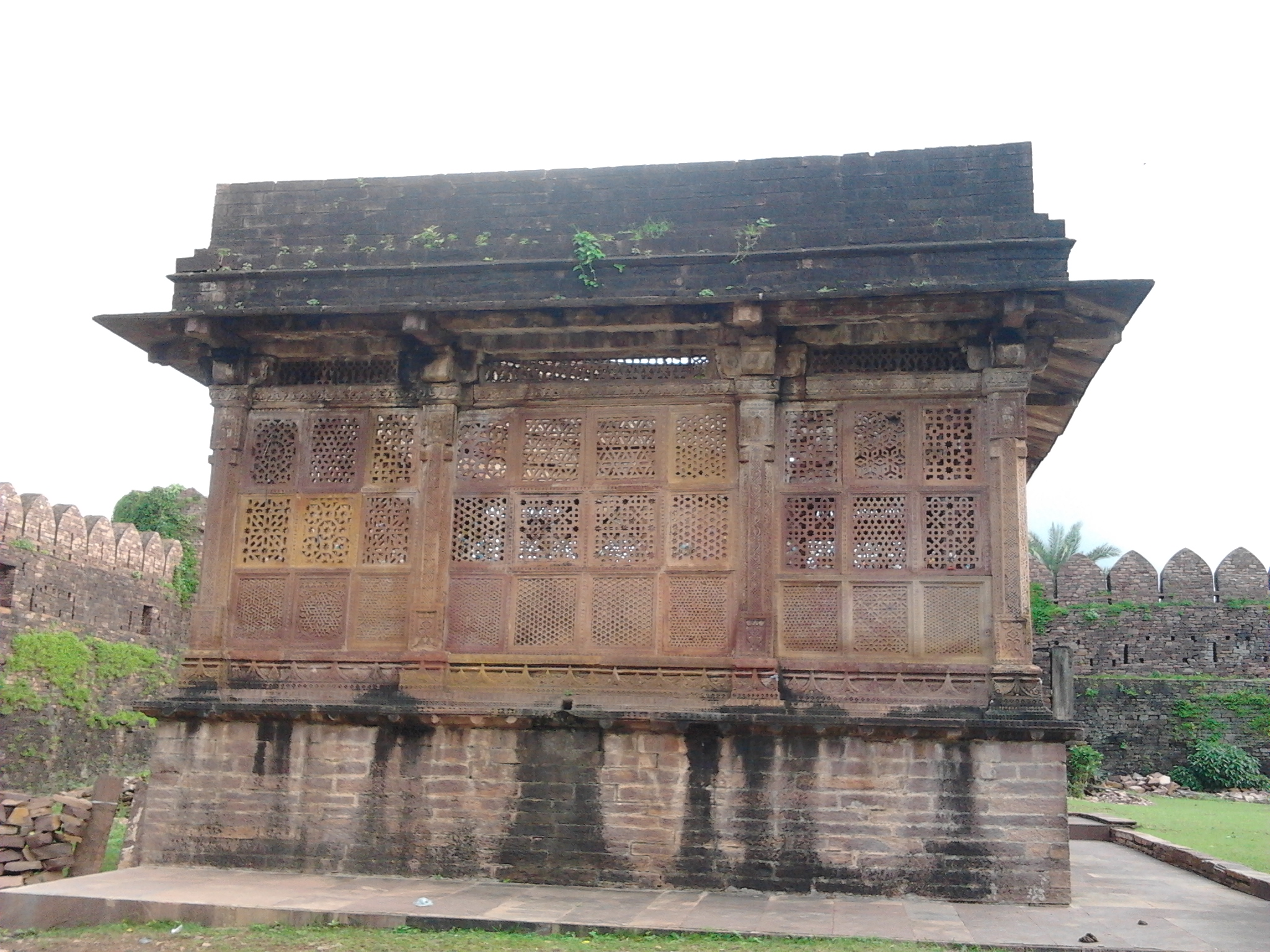
Khimlasa fort

== Khimlasa Fort ==
Khimlasa fort is a 16th century fortress located in within the Khurai tehsil of the Sagar district of Madhya Pradesh, India. It was known for its mix of defensive military layouts and the intricate stone carvings. It built by officials during the Raisen Dynasty and it features intricate carvings, several towers, multiple rooms, and also a Panch Pir tomb.

== Demographics ==
As per the 2011 Population Census, Khimlasa village has 10333 inhabitants, 5489 men and 4844 women.

== Other Activities ==
Visiting place in khimlasa is KHIMLASA POND, HANUMAN TEMPLE, NARAYANI TEMPLE, SHIV TEMPLE etc. There are many famous Jain temples located.

Here is one Stadium for playing outdoor games like cricket, football, balleyball and other outdoor games.
