= Lakshmi Temple, Khajuraho =

Lakshmi Temple
- लक्ष्मी मंदिर
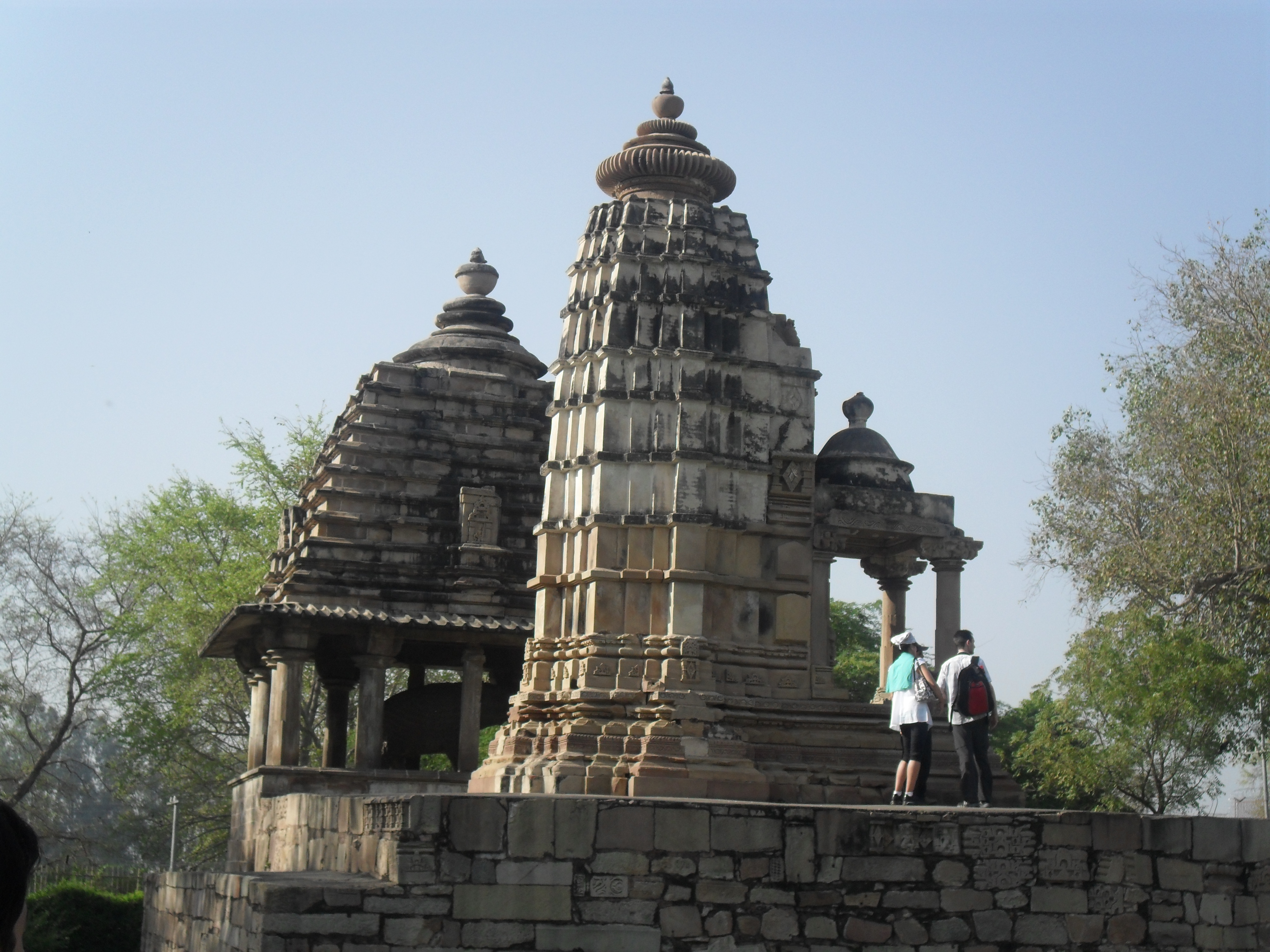
- Lakshmi Temple at Khajuraho

- Location in Madhya Pradesh Lakshmi Temple, Khajuraho (India)

Religion
- Affiliation: Hinduism
- District: Chhatarpur
- Deity: Lakshmi (modern); originally Garuda

Location
- Location: Khajuraho
- State: Madhya Pradesh
- Country: India
- Coordinates: 24°51′7.7″N 79°55′20″E

Architecture
- Creator: Chandela dynasty
- Established: c. 930–950 CE
- Temple: 1

Lakshmi Temple (Devanagari: लक्ष्मी मंदिर) is a small Hindu temple in Khajuraho, Chhatarpur district, Madhya Pradesh, India. It is part of the Khajuraho Group of Monuments, a UNESCO World Heritage Site. The temple is located in the Western Group of temples, facing the eastern entrance of the Lakshmana Temple and situated north of the Varaha Temple.

== History and identification ==
The temple was built in the mid-10th century during the reign of the Chandela dynasty, approximately between 930–950 CE. It was originally constructed as a shrine for Garuda, the vahana (vehicle) of Lord Vishnu. In Vishnu temples across India, a Garuda shrine or Garuda stambha traditionally faces the main sanctum, similar to the Nandi shrine in Shiva temples. The temple's current name, "Lakshmi Temple," is considered a misnomer, as the original dedication was to Garuda.

Inside the shrine, a damaged image of Brahmani was installed in the modern era, which is now worshipped as Lakshmi. The temple is often locked and not open for regular darshan.

== Architecture ==
The Lakshmi Temple is a small, modest shrine typical of structures built for a vahana. It features a square-shaped platform (chabutara) and a small sanctum. The temple has a simple mandapa (pillared hall) and a sanctum. The side and back walls are plain and do not contain any sculptures.

The sanctum originally housed a lalitabimba (seated image) of Garuda with Vishnu. The limited artwork around the doorway has been defaced, with several statues beheaded over time.

== Location ==
The temple is situated in the Western Group of Temples in Khajuraho. It stands immediately opposite the eastern entrance of the Lakshmana Temple and north of the Varaha Temple. Khajuraho is a small town in Chhatarpur District of Madhya Pradesh, India.

== See also ==
- Khajuraho Group of Monuments
- Lakshmana Temple, Khajuraho
- Varaha Temple, Khajuraho
