= Rahatgarh Fort =

Historic fort in Madhya Pradesh, India

- Rahatgarh Fort
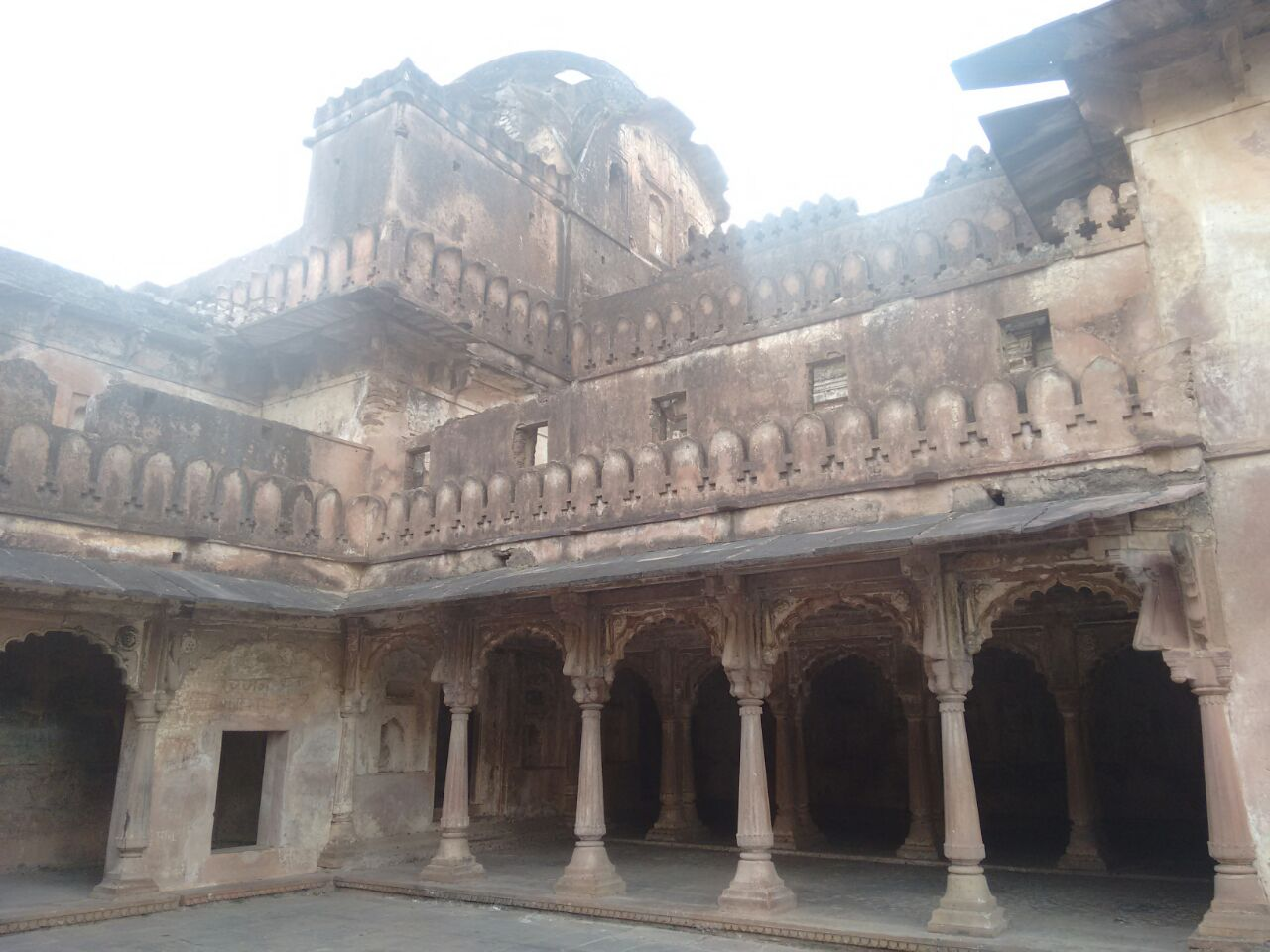

- Location within Madhya Pradesh
- 23.78°N 78.37°E
- Type: Fort building

Rahatgarh Fort is a historical fort located on the banks of Bina River in Rahatgarh in Sagar District, Madhya Pradesh, India.

== Overview ==
Originally built during the parmar dynasty (Circa 13th Century AD) later the fort was expanded by Sultan Mahmud Khan in 17th century, Rahatgarh Fort is situated on the top of north west peak along the range of hills near the town itself. It can be approached by means of a long winding passage, and the walls of the fortification are approximately 100 m thick.

Parmars, Chandelas and Muslims also had control over this fort. This fort also played an important role in the revolution of 1857.

== Gallery ==
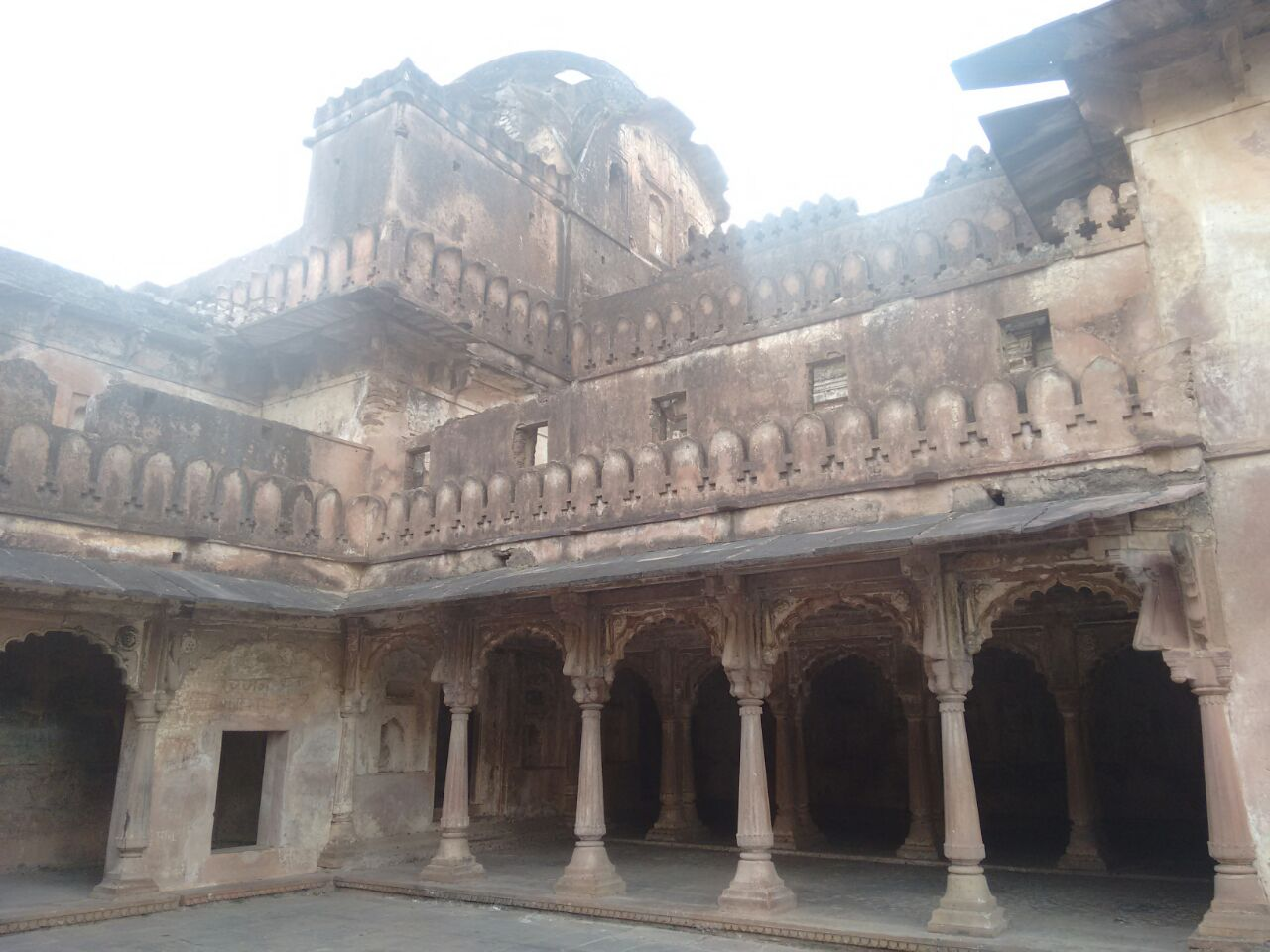
Rahatgarh Fort

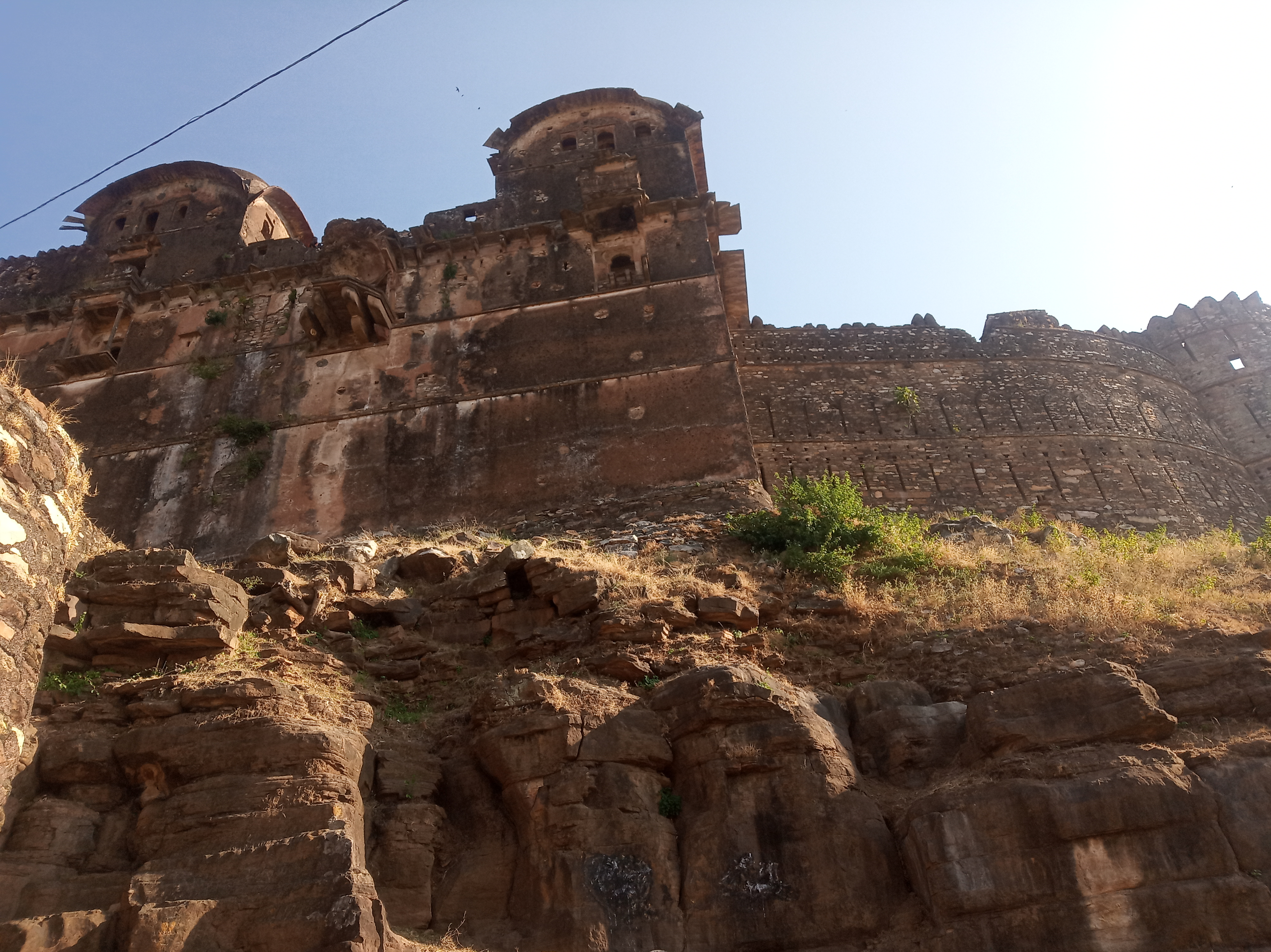
rahatgarh fort outside

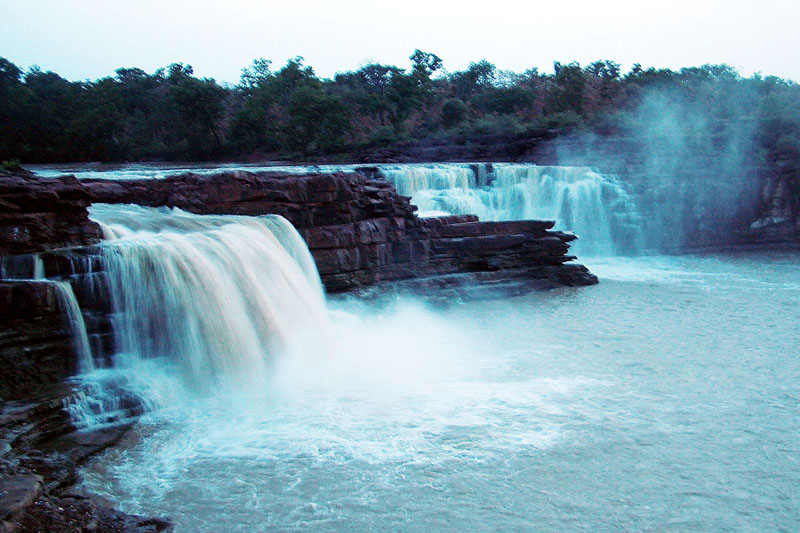
Rahatgarh Waterfall

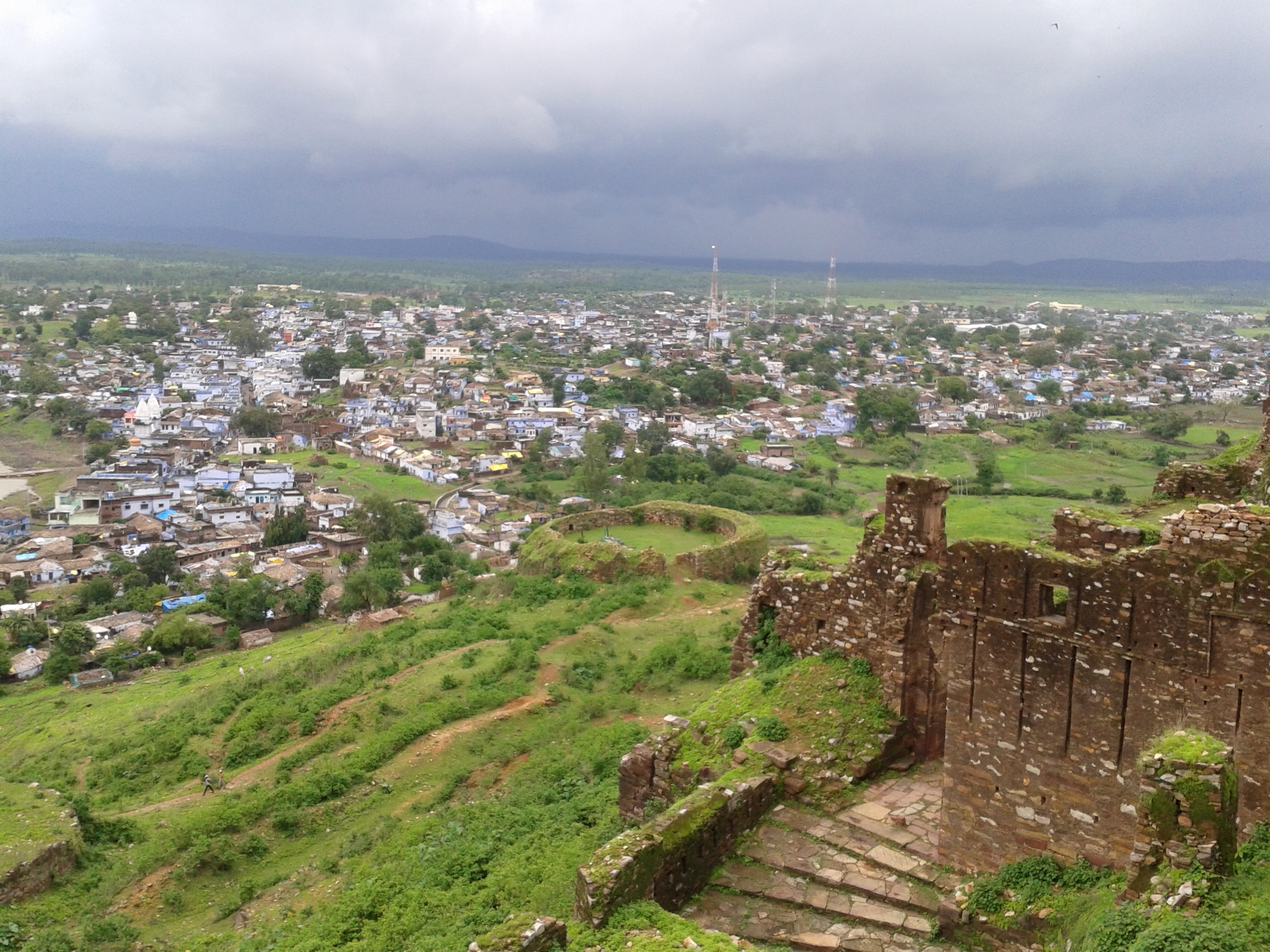
Rahatgarh Town
