= Dhamoni =

Archaeological site in Madhya Pradesh, India

Dhamoni Dhamoni
- Village and archaeological site
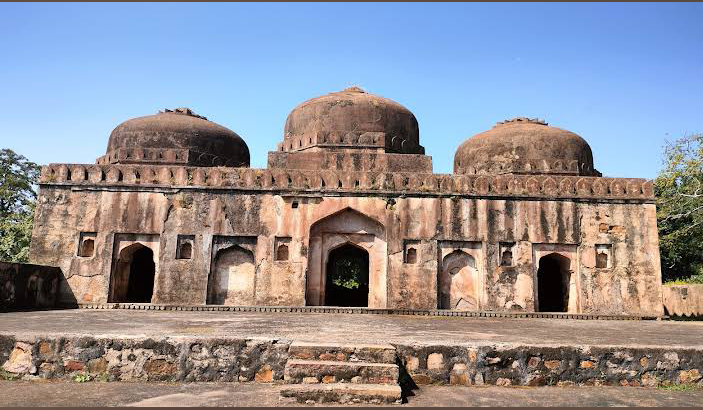
- Dhamoni fort

- Location within Madhya Pradesh Location within India
- Coordinates: 24.19°N 78.76°E
- Country: India
- State: Madhya Pradesh
- District: Sagar

Dhamoni is a village, archaeological site and Muslim religious site in the north of the Sagar district of Madhya Pradesh, India.

== Overview ==
Dhamoni, Tehsil Banda Sagar, was once a garh in the kingdom of Garh Mandala, with 750 mouzas. Although now a secluded place, an old fortress indicates Dhamoni holds archaeological significance. One curiosity in the hamlet is an active well, which, though situated in a dry area, has chilled water said to have curative properties.

== Nearby attractions ==
- Panch Peer: An important religious place of Muslim society.
- Balijat Shah ki Dargah: Baba Balijat is considered the guru of Rahim Khan, it is his tomb where Urs is held.
- Dhamoni Fort: The fort is a place of major attraction, which has some rooms and a palace, here people come for picnic.
- Haathi Darwaja: Hathi Darwaza is a major point from where one can enter or exit the fort, it is a very beautiful and carved building.

== Gallery ==
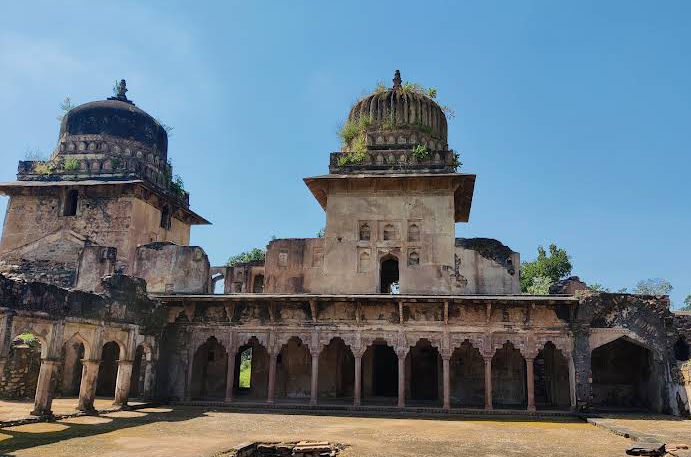
Dhamoni fort

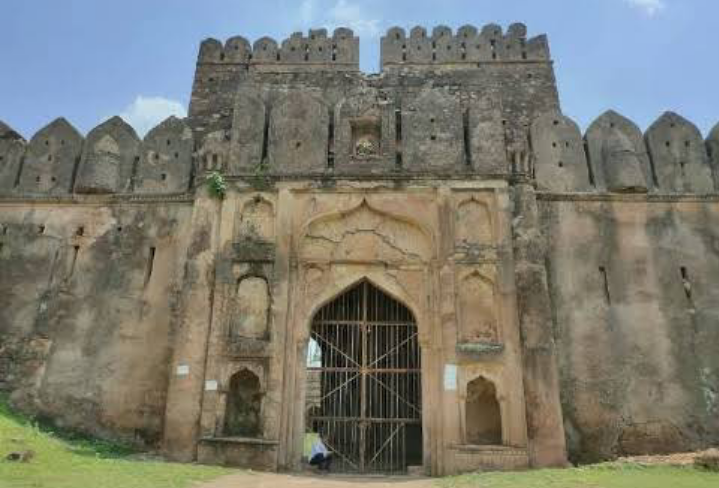
Dhamoni Fort

== Dhamoni ka Urs ==
Every year, a three-day Urs is organized at the tomb of Baba Balijat Shah in Dhamoni of Banda Development Block, when many Qawwals take part. This fair is one of the major fairs of the Muslim society. Every year lakhs of Muslims come here to participate in it.

== Access ==
Dhamoni is well connected with roads. Sagar is 40 km away, served by a railway station.
