= Chaturbhuj Temple (Khajuraho) =

Hindu Temple of the god Vishnu in Khajuraho, India

Chaturbhuj Temple (Devanagari: चतुर्भुज मंदिर) is a temple dedicated to the Hindu god shiva in Khajuraho, India in the village of Jatakari. It is also known as Jatakari Temple (Devanagari: जटकारी).

The name Chaturbhuja (lit. "One who has four arms") is an epithet of Vishnu. The temple was built by Yasovarman of the Chandela Dynasty in c. 1100 CE. This is the only temple in Khajuraho which lacks erotic sculptures.

As part of the Khajuraho Group of Monuments, the temple was inscribed on the UNESCO World Heritage List in 1986 because of its architecture and testimony to the Chandela dynasty.

== Architecture ==
The temple consists of a sanctum without ambulatory, vestibule, mandapa and an entrance porch. The temple stands on a Modest (chabutara).

Around the wall, there are three bands of sculptures (see also image of outer wall).

== Main idol ==
The main idol in the temple is of four-armed Vishnu (also seen in the image). It is 2.7 meters in height.

== Gallery ==
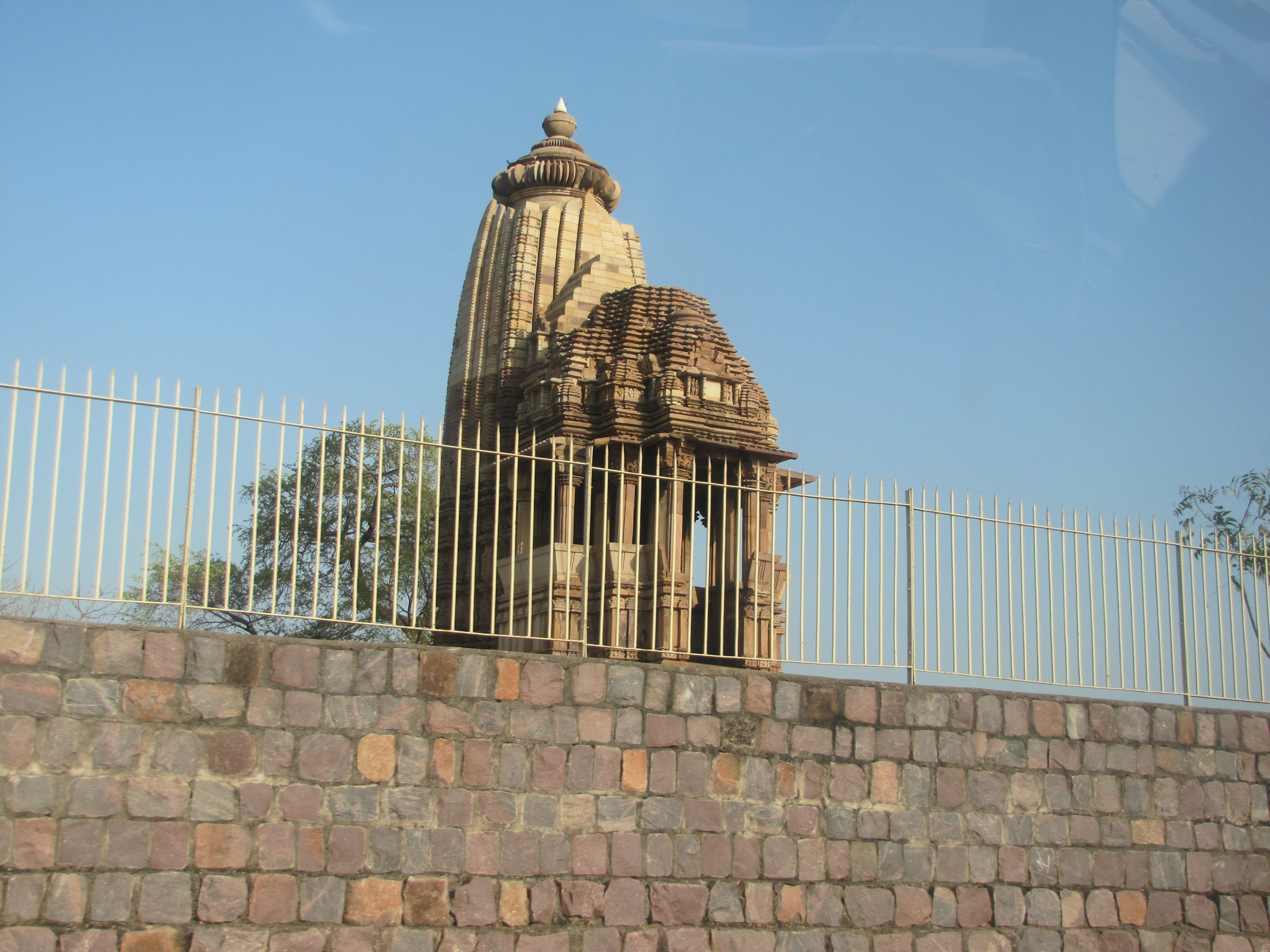
Chaturbhuj Temple, Khajuraho India

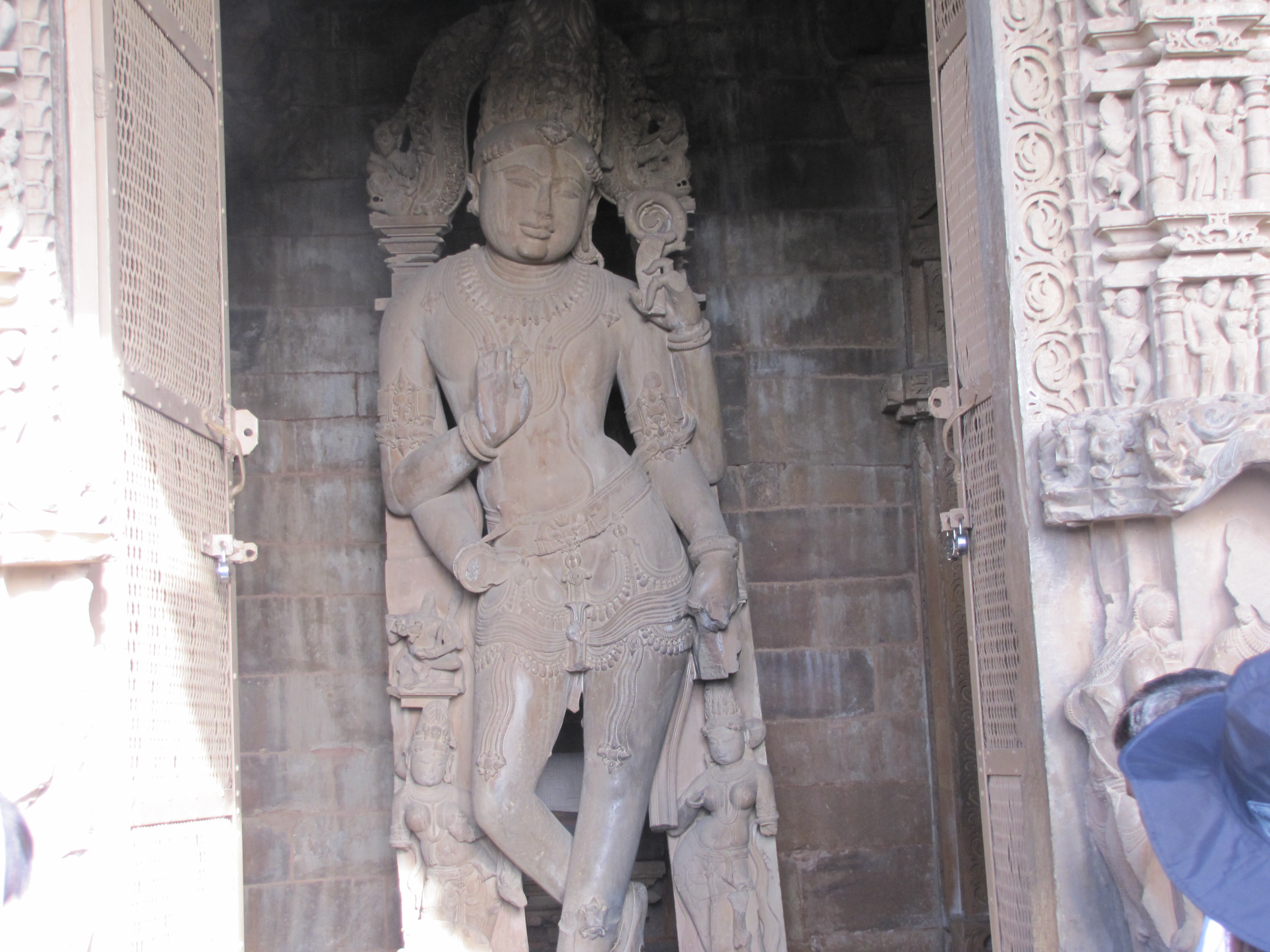
Main Idol (Vishnu), Chaturbhuj Temple, Khajuraho India

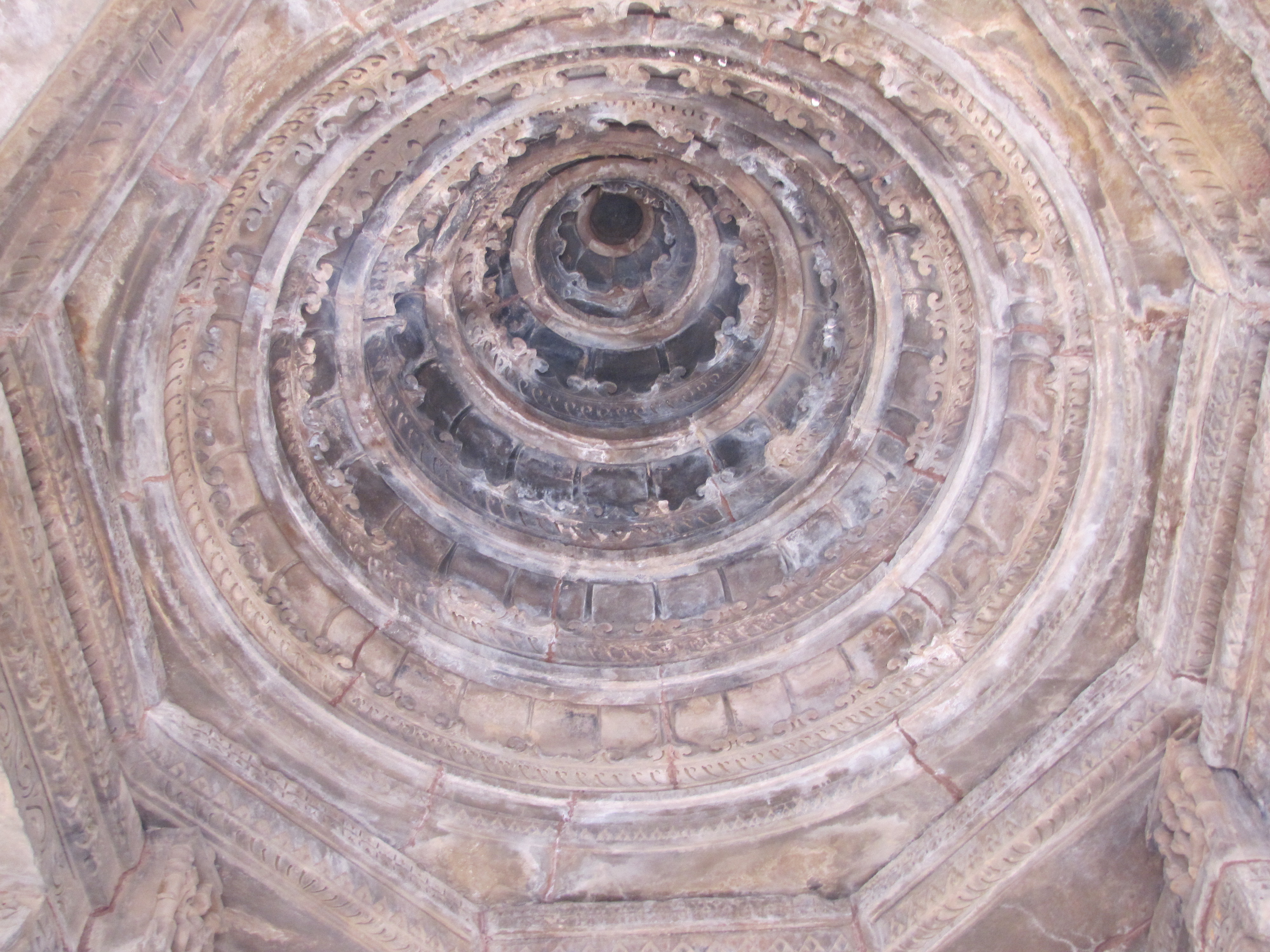
Roof, Chaturbhuj Temple, Khajuraho India

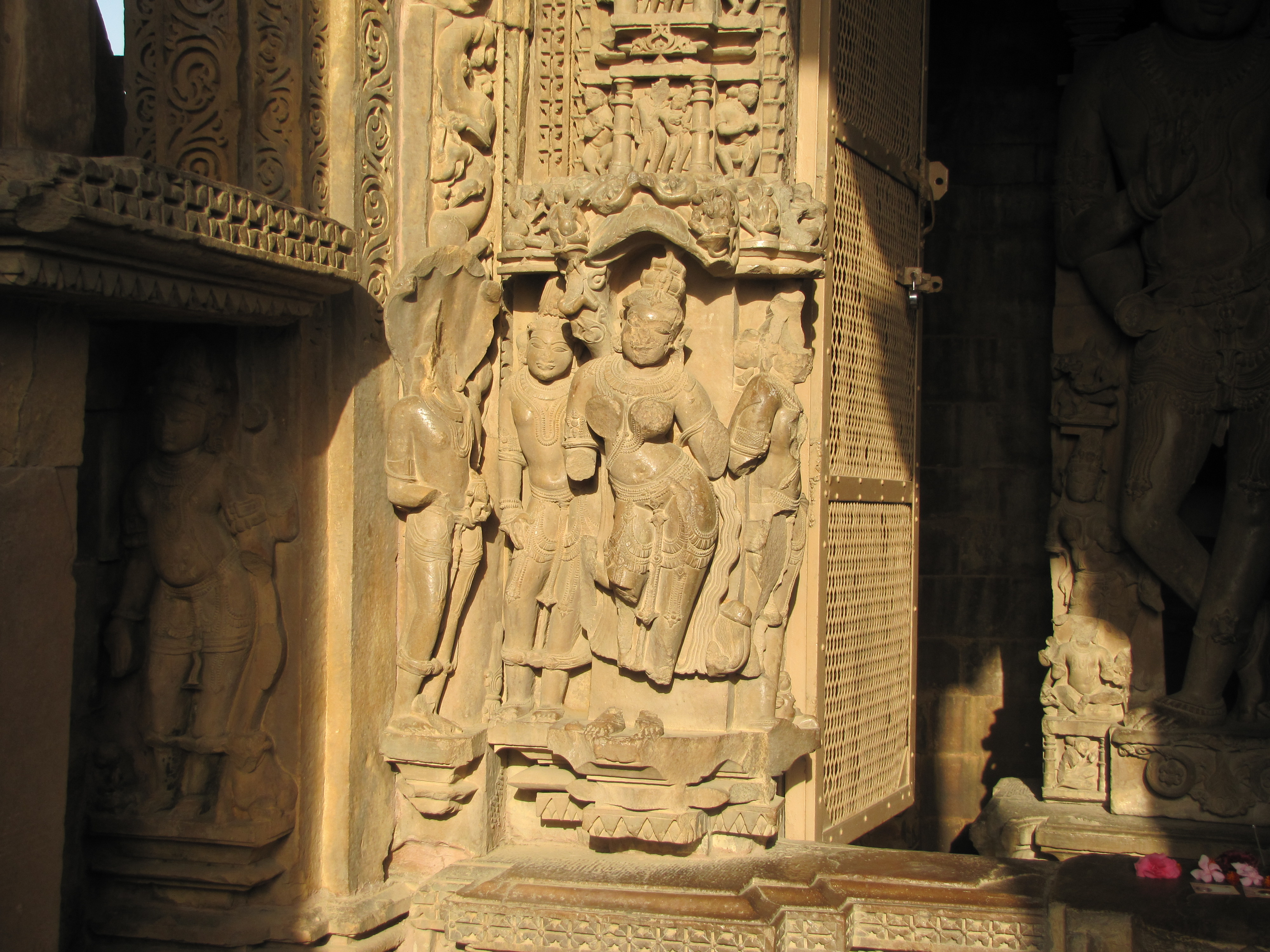
Ganga-Yamuna Sculpture Chaturbhuj Temple, Khajuraho India

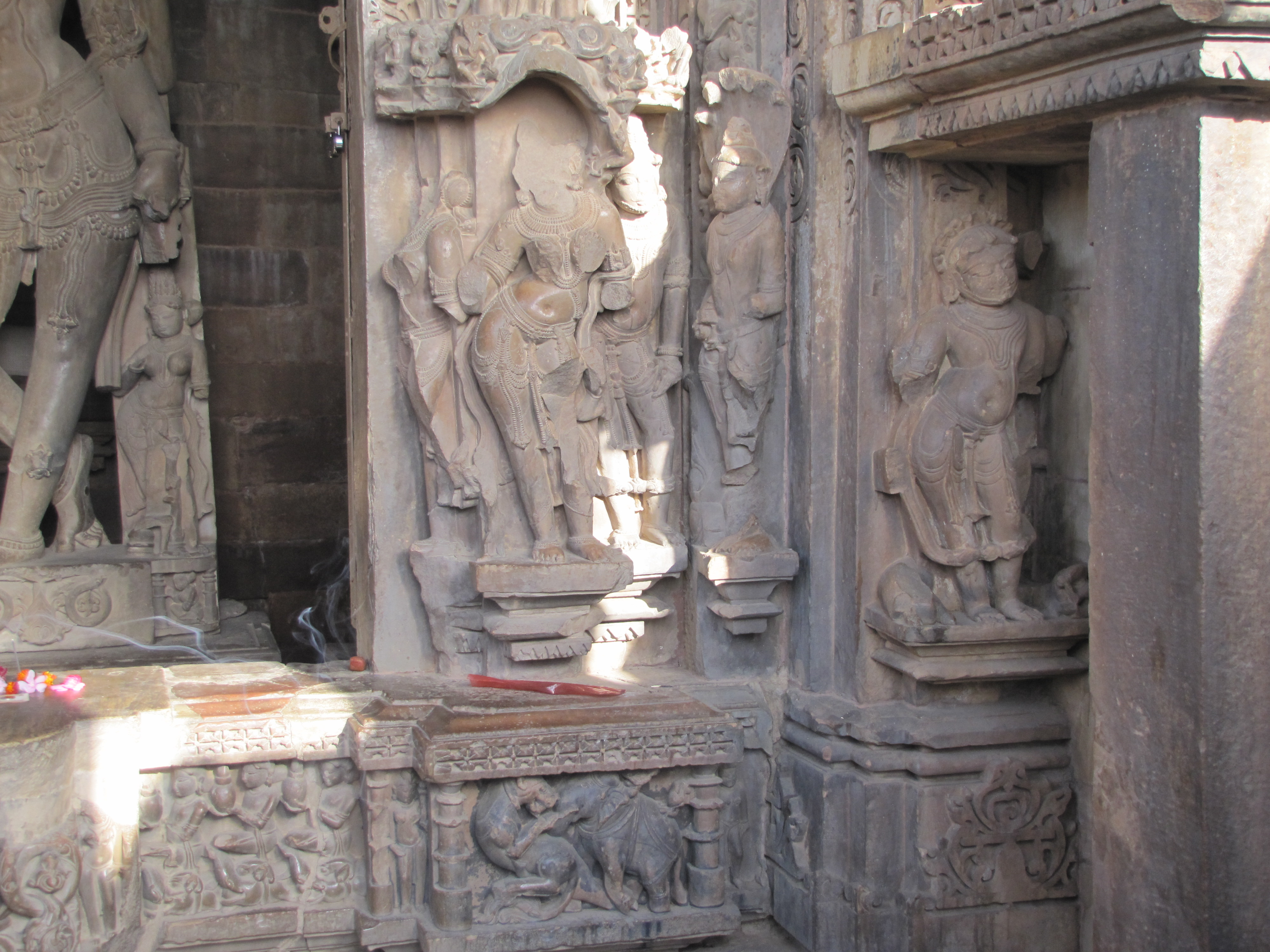
Ganga-Yamuna Sculpture Chaturbhuj Temple, Khajuraho India

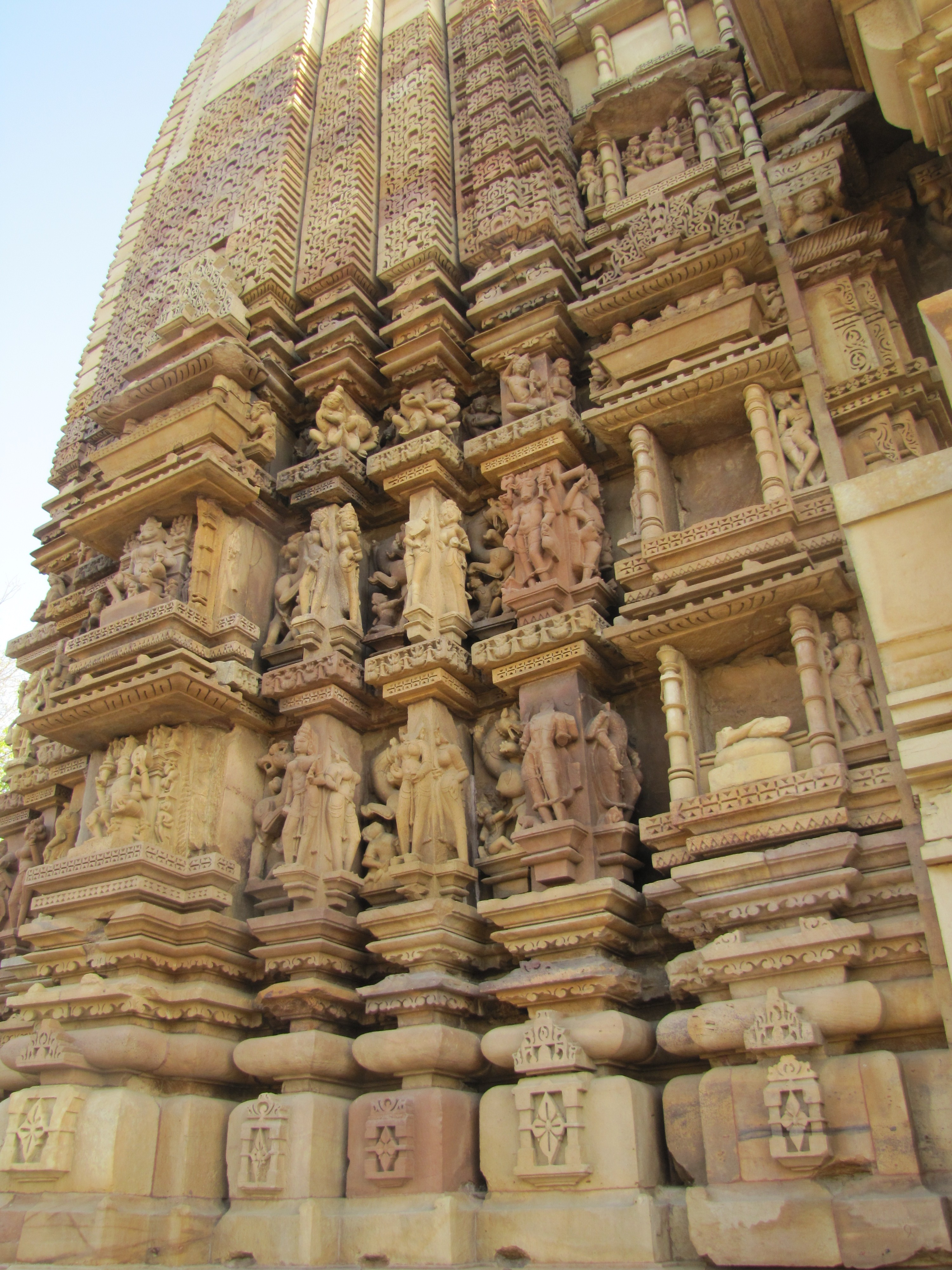
Outer Wall, Chaturbhuj Temple, Khajuraho India

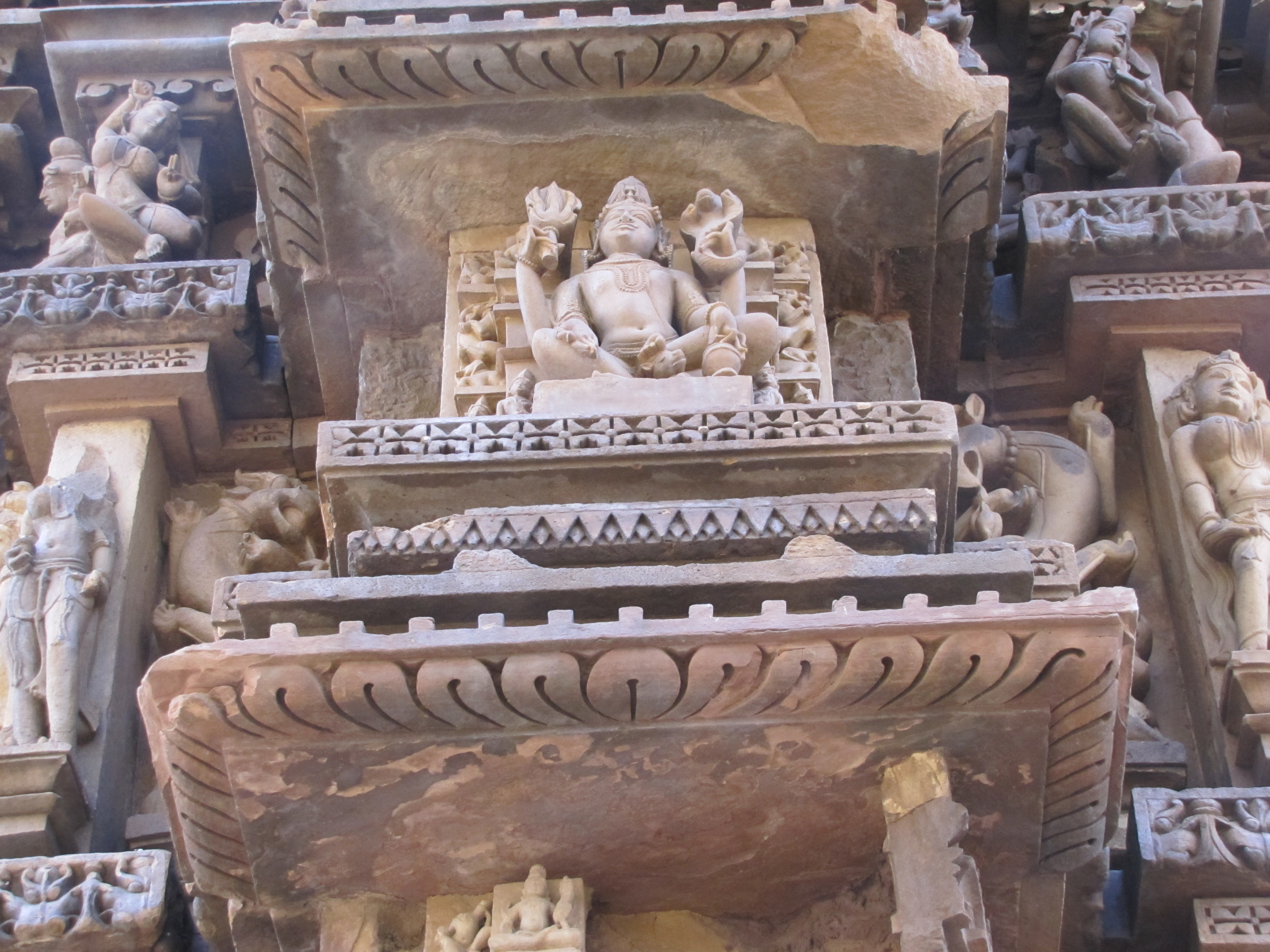
Shiva Sculpture on Outer Wall, Chaturbhuj Temple, Khajuraho India
