= Parvati Temple, Khajuraho =

Hindu temple of goddess Parvati in Khajuraho, India

Parvati Temple
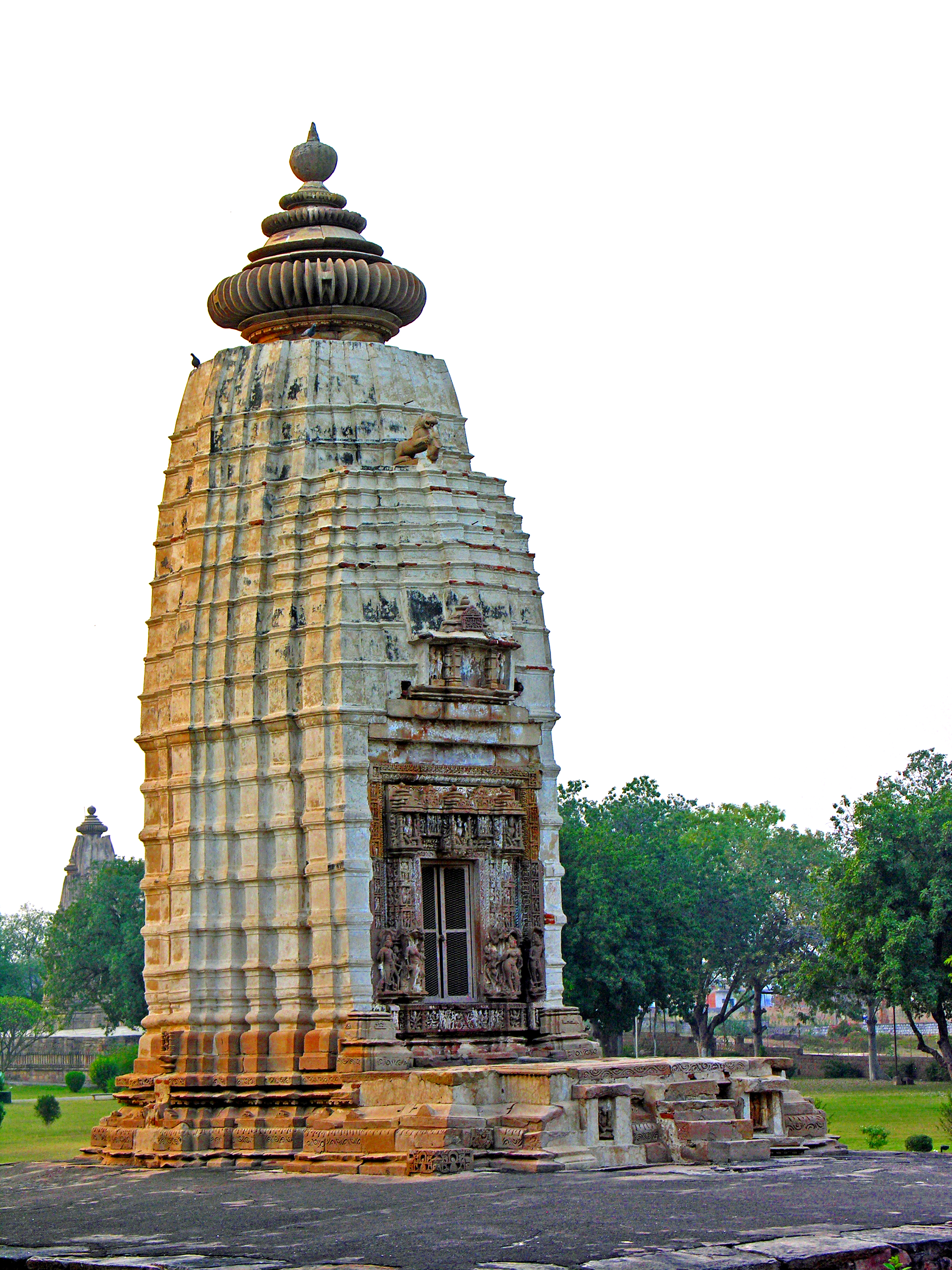
- Parvati Temple at Khajuraho

- Location in Madhya Pradesh

Religion
- Affiliation: Hinduism
- District: Chattarpur, Khajuraho
- Deity: Parvati

Location
- Location: Khajuraho
- State: Madhya Pradesh
- Country: India
- Interactive map of Parvati Temple
- Coordinates: 24°51′11.4″N 79°55′19″E

Architecture
- Creator: Chandela Rulers
- Temple: 1

Parvati Temple is a temple dedicated to the goddess Parvati, consort of Shiva.

This structure is one of the monuments among Khajuraho Group of Monuments, a World Heritage Site in India.

== Location ==
The temple is located in the Western Group of Temple Complex Khajuraho. Inside the temple complex, it is located south-west to Vishvanath Temple.

Khajuraho is a small village in Chattarpur District of Madhya Pradesh, India.

== Architecture ==
It has heavily restored small sanctum. The porch is completely lost and of the sanctum only the plinth has survived.

The arch above sanctum door depicts sculpture of Brahma, Vishnu and Shiva. Also numerous erotic sculptures of couples can be seen on the front wall (on the side of sanctum door.

The side and back walls do not have any sculptures.
