= Khajuraho =

- City
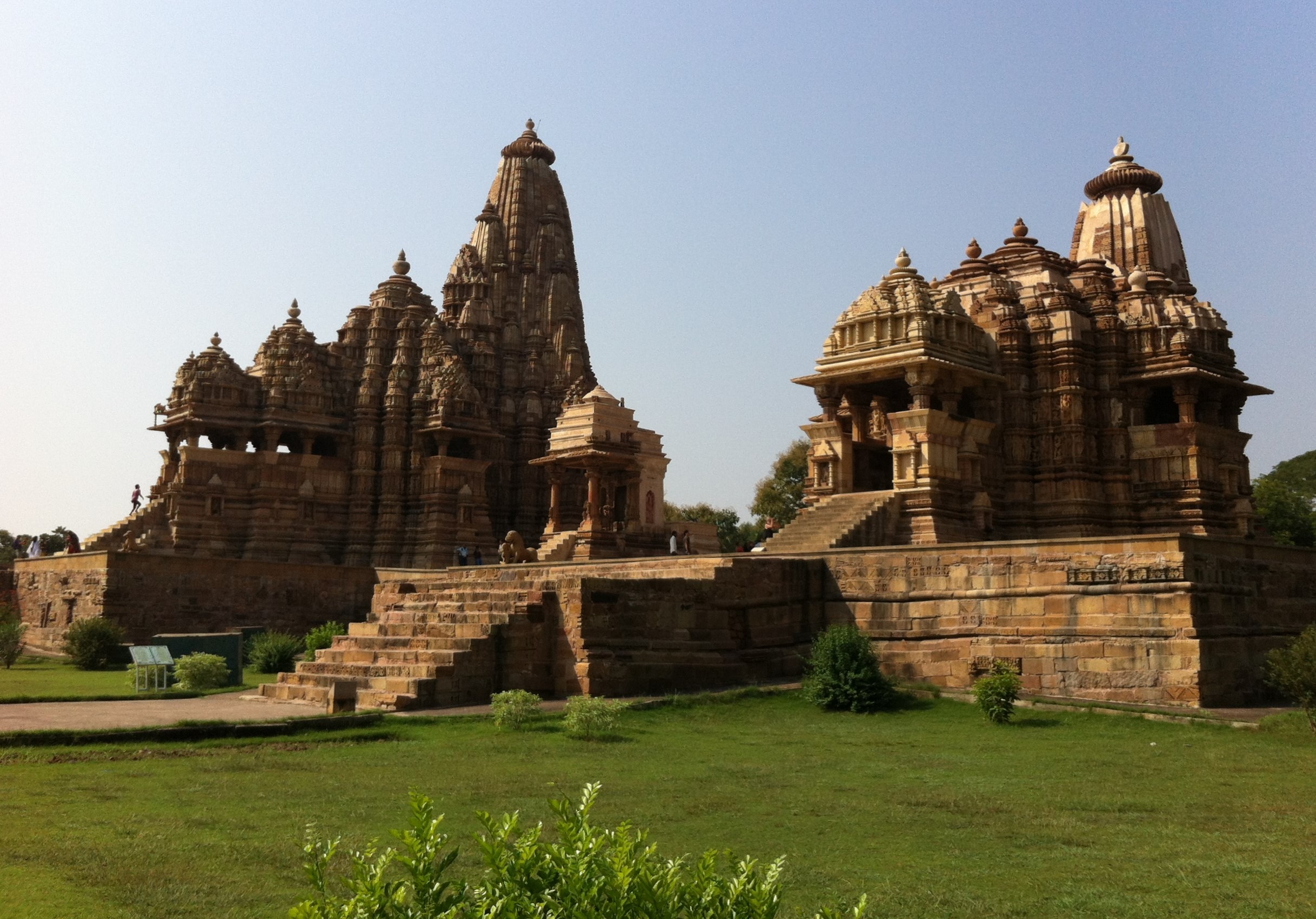
- Khajuraho Temples

- Location within Madhya Pradesh Location within India
- Coordinates: 24°51′00″N 79°55′30″E
- Country: India
- State: Madhya Pradesh
- District: Chhatarpur
- Elevation: 283 m (928 ft)

Population (2011)
  - Total: 24,481
- Time zone: UTC+5:30 (IST)
- Vehicle registration: MP-16
- Sex ratio: 1.100 ♂/♀

Khajuraho is a city, near Chhatarpur in Chhatarpur district of the Indian state of Madhya Pradesh. One of the most popular tourist destinations in India, Khajuraho has the country's largest group of medieval Hindu and Jain temples, famous for their erotic sculptures. The Khajuraho Group of Monuments has been listed as a UNESCO World Heritage Site since 1986 and is considered one of the "seven wonders" of India. The town's name, anciently "Kharjuravahaka", is derived from the Sanskrit word kharjur meaning "date palm".

== History ==
The region was historically part of many kingdoms and empires. The earliest known power to have had Khajuraho in its territory were the Vatsa. Their successors in the region included the Mauryans, Sungas, Kushans, Nagas of Padmavati, the Vakataka dynasty, the Guptas, the Pushyabhuti dynasty, and the Gurjara-Praithara dynasty. It was specifically during the Gupta period that architecture and art began to flourish in this region, although their successors continued the artistic tradition.

The Chandelas ruled the area from the ninth century, who were subject to the Gurjara-Praitharas. During the reign of Dhanga (c. 950–1002) the Chandelas became independent and many important temples were built during this time. The Chandelas were dealt with fatal blows first from the Chahamanas of Shakambhari in 1182 then from Qutb al-Din Aibak in 1202. Khajuraho declined to a small village as the Chandelas transferred their activities to the forts of Mahoba, Kalinjar, and Ajayagarh.

Ibn Battuta visited Khajuraho and described the presence of temples and a few ascetics. Some temples were damaged by Sikander Lodi in 1495. By the 16th century Khajuraho became an insignificant place and was only "rediscovered" by C. J. Franklin (a military surveyor) in 1819. However, the actual distinction of bringing Khajuraho back to the world's attention is given to T. S. Burt (a British army captain) who visited it in 1838. The next significant visitor was Alexander Cunningham between 1852 and 1855.

== Climate ==
Climate data for Khajuraho (1991–2020, extremes 1970–2020)
Month	Jan	Feb	Mar	Apr	May	Jun	Jul	Aug	Sep	Oct	Nov	Dec	Year
Record high °C (°F)	34.3 (93.7)	38.6 (101.5)	43.1 (109.6)	46.9 (116.4)	48.4 (119.1)	48.0 (118.4)	45.0 (113.0)	41.0 (105.8)	39.3 (102.7)	42.8 (109.0)	38.5 (101.3)	33.2 (91.8)	48.4 (119.1)
Mean daily maximum °C (°F)	23.6 (74.5)	28.1 (82.6)	34.4 (93.9)	40.2 (104.4)	43.2 (109.8)	40.8 (105.4)	34.6 (94.3)	32.8 (91.0)	33.6 (92.5)	34.1 (93.4)	30.5 (86.9)	26.3 (79.3)	33.4 (92.1)
Mean daily minimum °C (°F)	8.4 (47.1)	10.7 (51.3)	15.7 (60.3)	21.7 (71.1)	26.8 (80.2)	28.3 (82.9)	26.3 (79.3)	25.3 (77.5)	24.1 (75.4)	19.1 (66.4)	13.6 (56.5)	8.9 (48.0)	18.9 (66.0)
Record low °C (°F)	0.8 (33.4)	0.6 (33.1)	6.0 (42.8)	12.6 (54.7)	18.6 (65.5)	20.4 (68.7)	22.4 (72.3)	21.8 (71.2)	17.3 (63.1)	11.7 (53.1)	4.8 (40.6)	1.9 (35.4)	0.6 (33.1)
Average rainfall mm (inches)	13.4 (0.53)	21.3 (0.84)	12.0 (0.47)	9.5 (0.37)	13.6 (0.54)	112.2 (4.42)	291.5 (11.48)	383.4 (15.09)	188.7 (7.43)	31.2 (1.23)	6.4 (0.25)	7.0 (0.28)	1,090.3 (42.93)
Average rainy days	1.3	1.5	1.0	0.9	1.2	5.9	13.2	13.8	8.1	1.5	0.5	0.4	49.5
Average relative humidity (%) (at 17:30 IST)	50	38	24	18	34	41	69	78	68	50	47	49	46
Source: India Meteorological Department

== Demographics ==
As of 2011, the Indian census stated that Khajuraho had a population of 24,481. Males constitute 52% of the population and females 48%. Khajuraho has an average literacy rate of 53%, lower than the national average of 74.04%: male literacy is 62%, and female literacy is 43%. In Khajuraho, 19% of the population is under six years of age.

== Transport ==
=== Air ===
Khajuraho Airport has flights to Delhi, Varanasi and Rewa. The airport is 3 km south of Khajuraho Town, and was opened in 1978 to facilitate tourism to the nearby UNESCO world heritage site temple complex. Concerns have been raised by experts regarding the feasibility of this airport and its impact on the world heritage site and the environment.

=== Rail ===
Khajuraho railway station connects the town by a daily train to Delhi via Chhatarpur, Tikamgarh, Jhansi, Gwalior, Agra, and Mathura. It provides a daily train connecting to Agra, Jaipur, Bhopal and Udaipur. A local daily train also connects to Kanpur, whilst Varanasi is connected three times a week. At present, Khajuraho is connected by rail with New Delhi by two trains, namely the Geeta Jayanti Express originating from Kurukshetra and the Uttar Pradesh Sampark Kranti Express originating from Hazrat Nizamuddin railway station.
