= Brahma Temple, Khajuraho =

Hindu temple of Shiva in Khajuraho, India

Coordinates: 24.8506°N 79.9328°E

Brahma Temple
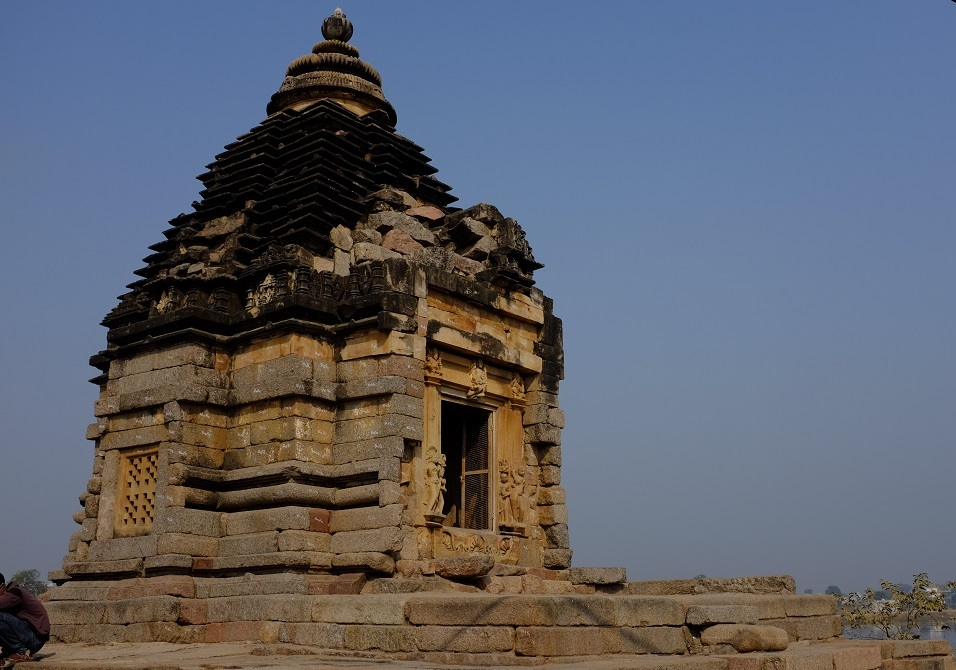
- Brahma Temple

Religion
- Affiliation: Hinduism
- District: Chattarpur
- Deity: Shiva

Location
- Location: Khajuraho
- State: Madhya Pradesh
- Country: India
- Interactive map of Brahma Temple

Architecture
- Type: Nagara architecture
- Creator: Chandela
- Completed: 9th/10th century
- Temple: 1

Brahma Temple is a ninth or early tenth century temple and is located at Chhatarpur in Madhya Pradesh, India. Although titled after the Hindu god Brahma, the temple is dedicated to Shiva. This temple, along with many others built during the Chandela dynasty, form the UNESCO World Heritage Site of Khajuraho Group of Monuments.

== Background ==
The temple is located on the banks of Khajuraho Sagar lake. It is incorrectly called Brahma Temple; the garbhagriha (sanctum) of the temple contains a four faced lingam, the symbol of Shiva, and local worshippers mistook this for a sculpture of Brahma, who has four faces. The western windows and the central positions of the lintels of the garbhagriha contain figures of Vishnu. However, the stones from which they are made are different from the stones which are used to build the temple.

The temple was built in either ninth and earlier half of the tenth century.

== Architecture ==
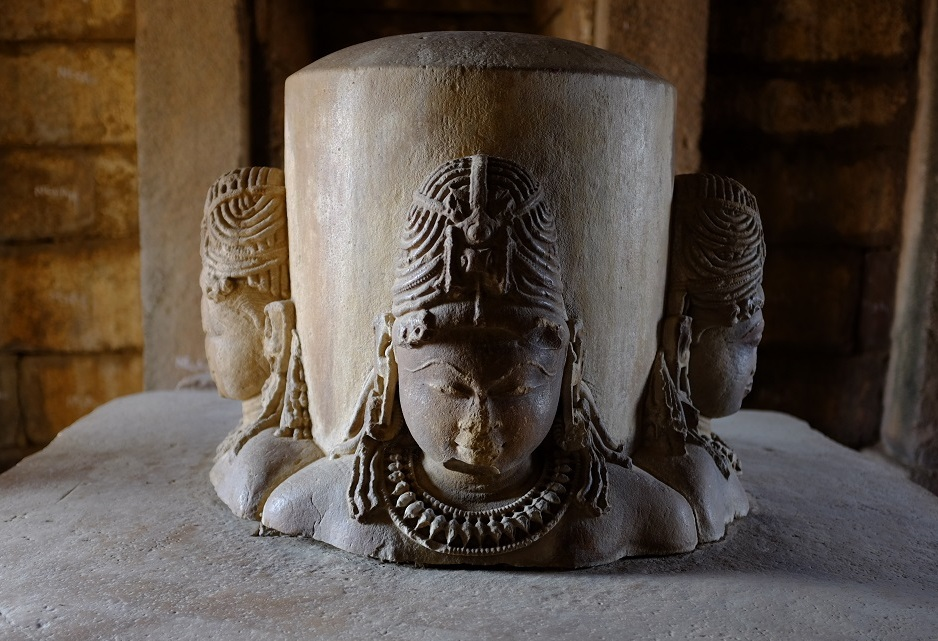
Shiva linga inside the temple

The Brahma temple is one of the various surviving temples in the Khajuraho temple complex. Unlike most of the other temples, which are made of grainstone, this temple is made of granite. The plan of this temple is similar to that of the Lalguan Mahadeva temple. These temples were built during a period in which a transition was occurring from granite to sandstone.

According to the Archaeological Survey of India, the plan of this temple is simpler compared to the other temples of Khajuraho. The shikhara (the tower over the chamber in which the deity is kept) is made of sandstone. The temple originally consisted of a porch and a garbhagriha. The porch has been destroyed and only the garbhagriha remains which is crowned by the shikhara. Externally, the garbhagriha is cruciform in shape and contains projections in each side. Internally, it is square in shape and rests on 12 pilasters of granite. The eastern projection contains the main doorway, and the western projection contains a smaller doorway. Latticed windows are present on the remaining two lateral projections.

The main doorway is largely unornamented. It only contains a sculpture of the trimurti on the lintel and Ganga and Yamuna at the base.
