= Khajuraho Group of Monuments =

Historic temples in Madhya Pradesh, India

UNESCO World Heritage Site
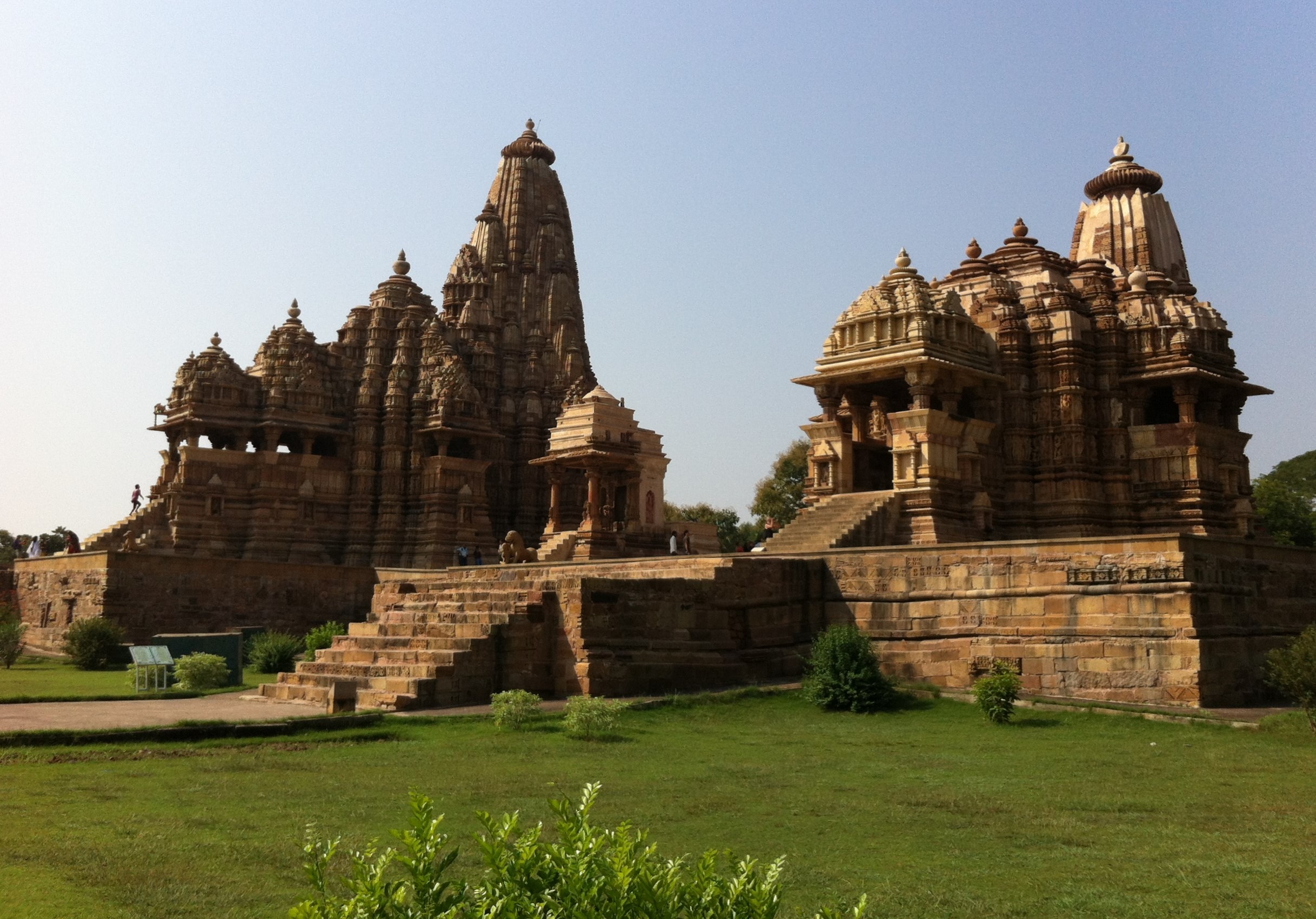

- Location within India Location within Madhya Pradesh
- Location: Khajuraho, Chhatarpur district, Madhya Pradesh, India
- Criteria: Cultural: i, iii
- Reference: 240
- Inscription: 1986 (10th Session)
- Coordinates: 24°51′16″N 79°55′17″E

The Khajuraho Group of Monuments are a group of Hindu and Digambara Jain temples in Chhatarpur district, Madhya Pradesh, India. They are about 46 km (28.6 mi) from Chhatarpur city, the district headquarters, 283 km (177 mi) from Gwalior, 175 kilometres (109 mi) southeast of Jhansi, 10 kilometres (6.2 mi) from Khajwa and 9 kilometres (5.6 mi) from Rajnagar. The temples are famous for their Nagara-style architectural symbolism and a few erotic sculptures.

Most Khajuraho temples were built between 885 CE and 1000 CE by the Chandela dynasty. Historical records note that the Khajuraho temple site had 85 temples by the 12th century, spread over 20 square kilometres (7.7 mi^{2}). Of these, only about 25 temples have survived, spread over six square kilometres (2.3 mi^{2}). Of the surviving temples, the Kandariya Mahadeva Temple is decorated with a profusion of sculptures with intricate details, symbolism, and expressiveness of ancient Indian art. The temple complex was forgotten and overgrown by the jungle until 1838 when Captain T.S. Burt, a British engineer, visited the complex and reported his findings in the Journal of the Asiatic Society of Bengal.

When these monuments were built, the boys in the place lived in hermitages, by being brahmacharyas (bachelors) until they attained manhood and these sculptures helped them to learn about the worldly role of 'householder'. The Khajuraho group of temples were built together but were dedicated to two religions, Hinduism and Jainism, suggesting a tradition of acceptance and respect for diverse religious views among Hindus and Jains in the region. Because of their outstanding architecture, diversity of temple forms, and testimony to the Chandela civilization, the monuments at Khajuraho were inscribed on the UNESCO World Heritage List in 1986.

== Etymology ==
The name Khajuraho, or Kharjuravāhaka, is derived from ancient Sanskrit (kharjura, खर्जूर means date palm, and vāhaka, वाहक means "one who carries" or bearer). Local legends state that the temples had two golden date-palm trees as their gate (missing when they were rediscovered). Desai states that Kharjuravāhaka also means scorpion bearer, which is another symbolic name for deity Shiva (who wears snakes and scorpion garlands in his fierce form).

Cunningham's nomenclature and systematic documentation work in the 1850s and 1860s have been widely adopted and continue to be in use. He grouped the temples into the Western group around Lakshmana, Eastern group around Javeri, and Southern group around Duladeva.

== Location ==
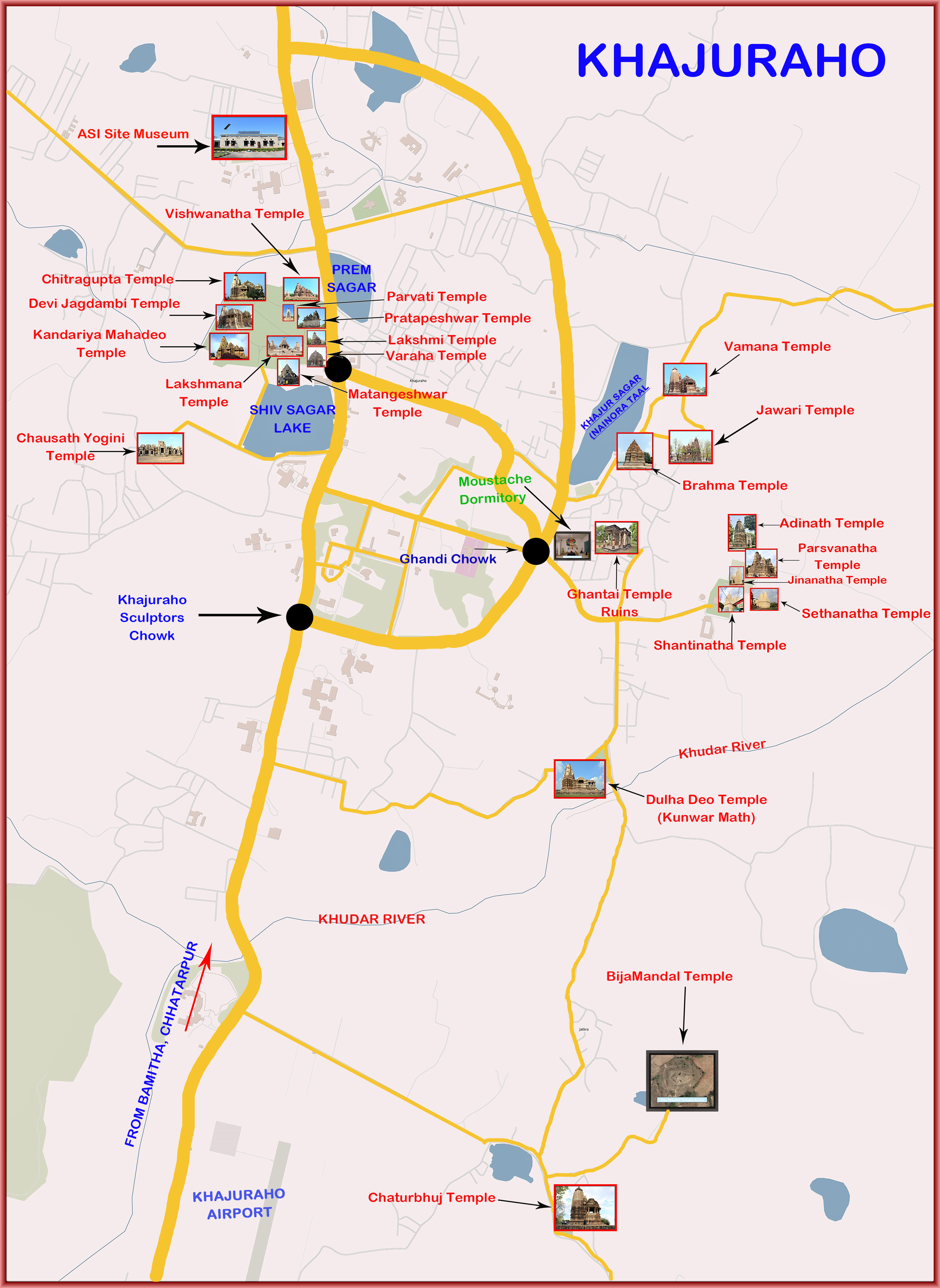
Khajuraho town Map

The Khajuraho monuments are located in the Indian state of Madhya Pradesh, in Chhatarpur district, about 620 kilometres (385 mi) southeast of New Delhi. The temples are located near a small town also known as Khajuraho, with a population of about 24,481 people (2011 Census).

Khajuraho is served by Civil Aerodrome Khajuraho (IATA Code: HJR), with services to Delhi, Agra, Varanasi and Mumbai. The site is also linked by the Indian Railways service, with the railway station located approximately six kilometres from the entrance to the monuments.

The monuments are about ten kilometres off the east-west National Highway 75, and about 50 kilometres from the city of Chhatarpur, which is connected to the state capital Bhopal by the SW-NE running National Highway 86.

The 10th-century Bhand Deva Temple in Rajasthan was built in the style of the Khajuraho monuments and is often referred to as 'Little Khajuraho'.

== History ==
The Khajuraho group of monuments was built during the rule of the Chandela dynasty. The building activity started almost immediately after the rise of their power, throughout their kingdom to be later known as Bundelkhand. Most temples were built during the reigns of the Hindu kings Yashovarman and Dhanga. Yashovarman's legacy is best exhibited by the Lakshmana Temple. Vishvanatha temple best highlights King Dhanga's reign. The largest and currently most famous surviving temple is Kandariya Mahadeva built in the reign of King Vidyadhara. The temple inscriptions suggest many of the currently surviving temples were complete between 970 and 1030 CE, with further temples completed during the following decades.

The Khajuraho temples were built about 35 miles from the medieval city of Mahoba, the capital of the Chandela dynasty, in the Kalinjar region. In ancient and medieval literature, their kingdom has been referred to as Jijhoti, Jejahoti, Chih-chi-to and Jejakabhukti.

The first documented mention of Khajuraho was made in 641 by Xuanzang, a Chinese pilgrim who described encountering several dozen inactive Buddhist monasteries and a dozen Hindu temples with a thousand worshipping brahmins. In 1022 CE, Khajuraho was mentioned by Abu Rihan-al-Biruni, the Persian historian who accompanied Mahmud of Ghazni in his raid of Kalinjar; he mentions Khajuraho as the capital of Jajahuti. The raid was unsuccessful, and a peace accord was reached when the Hindu king agreed to pay a ransom to Mahmud of Ghazni to end the attack and leave.

Khajuraho temples were in active use through the end of the 12th century. This changed in the 13th century; after the army of Delhi Sultanate, under the command of the Muslim Sultan Qutb-ud-din Aibak, attacked and seized the Chandela kingdom. About a century later, Ibn Battuta, the Moroccan traveller in his memoirs about his stay in India from 1335 to 1342 CE, mentioned visiting Khajuraho temples, calling them "Kajarra" as follows:

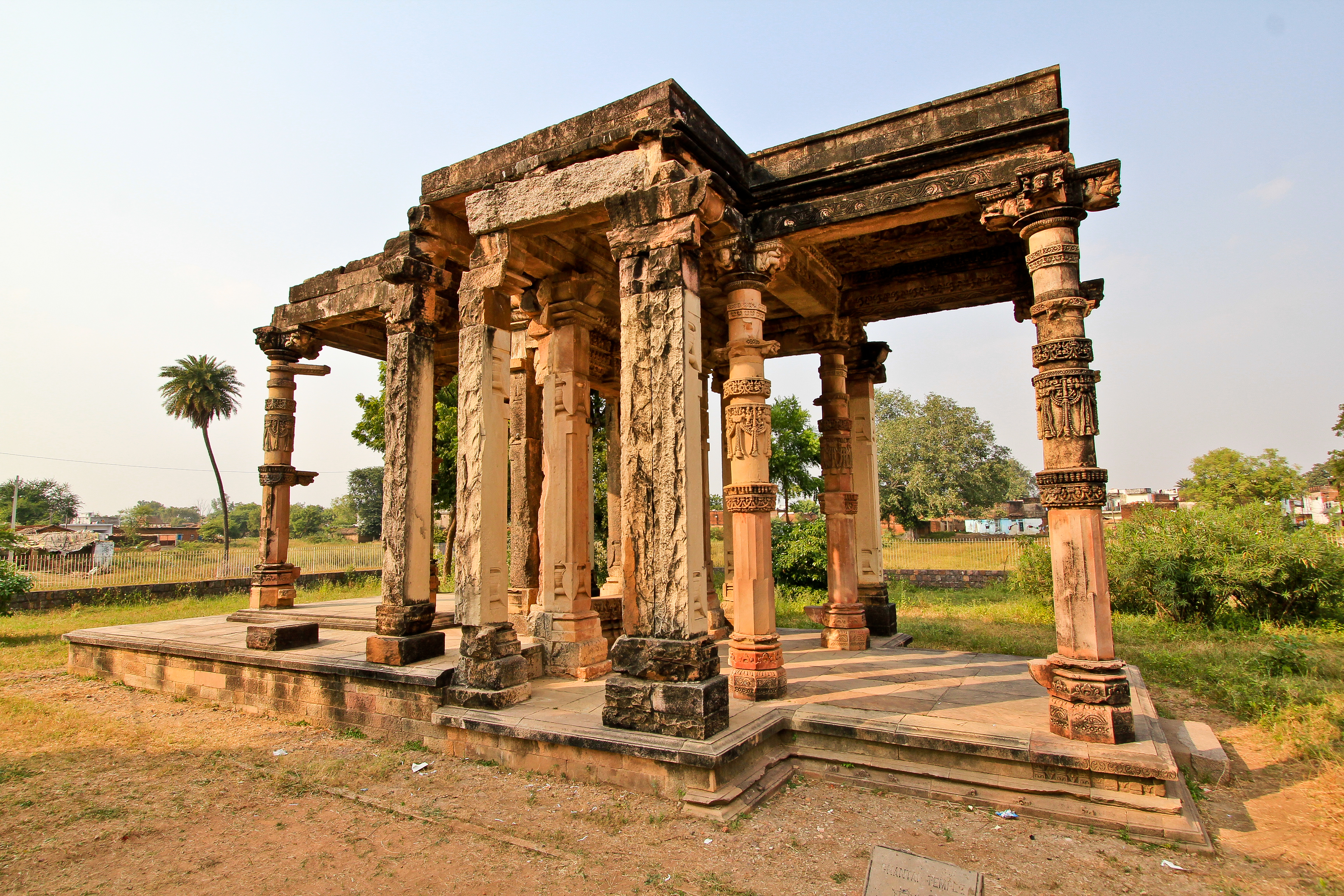
Until the 12th century, Khajuraho was under Hindu kings and featured 85 temples. Central India was seized by Delhi Sultanate in the 13th century. Under Muslim rule, many temples were destroyed and the rest left in neglect. Ruins of some old temples (Ghantai temple above) are still visible.

...near (Khajuraho) temples, which contain idols that have been mutilated by the Moslems, live a number of yogis whose matted locks have grown as long as their bodies. And on account of extreme asceticism they are all yellow in colour. Many Moslems attend these men in order to take lessons (yoga) from them.

— Ibn Battuta, about 1335 CE, Riḥlat Ibn Baṭūṭah, Translated by Arthur Cotterell

The central Indian region, where Khajuraho temples are, was controlled by various Muslim dynasties from the 13th century through the 18th century. In this period, some temples were desecrated, followed by a long period when they were left in neglect. In 1495 CE, for example, Sikandar Lodi's campaign of temple destruction included Khajuraho. The remoteness and isolation of Khajuraho protected the Hindu and Jain temples from continued destruction by Muslims. Over the centuries, vegetation and forests overgrew the temples.

In the 1830s, local Hindus guided a British surveyor, T.S. Burt, to the temples and they were thus rediscovered by the global audience. Alexander Cunningham later reported, few years after the rediscovery, that the temples were secretly in use by yogis and thousands of Hindus would arrive for pilgrimage during Shivaratri celebrated annually in February or March based on a lunar calendar. In 1852, F.C. Maisey prepared earliest drawings of the Khajuraho temples.

== Description ==
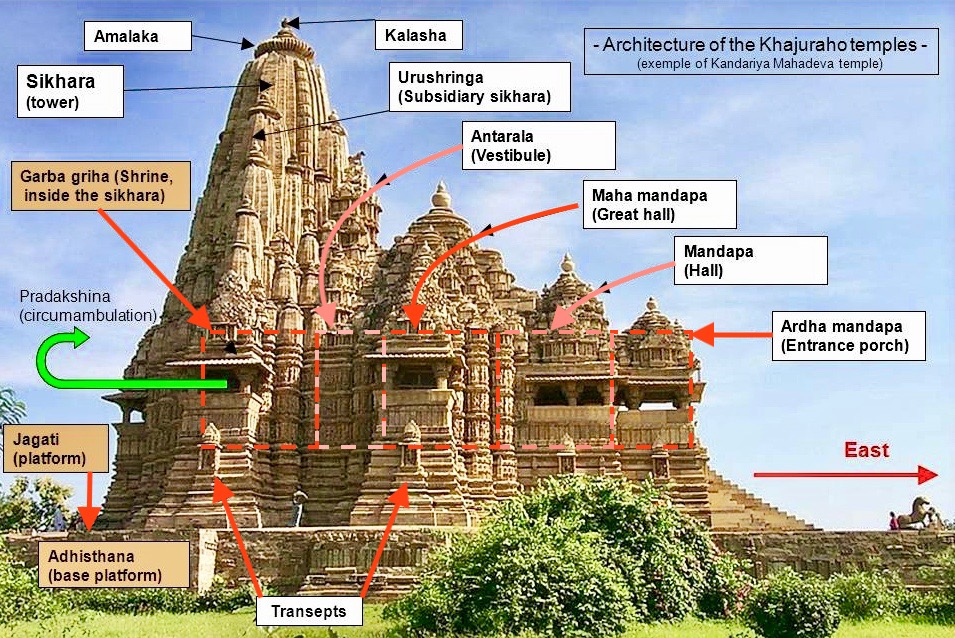
Sections and orientation of Khajuraho temples.

The temple site is within Vindhya mountain range in central India. An ancient local legend held that Hindu deity Shiva and other gods enjoyed visiting the dramatic hill formation in Kalinjar area. The center of this region is Khajuraho, set midst local hills and rivers. The temple complex reflects the ancient Hindu tradition of building temples where gods love to pray.

The temples are clustered near water, another typical feature of Hindu temples. The current water bodies include Sib Sagar, Khajur Sagar (also called Ninora Tal) and Khudar Nadi (river). Local legends state that the temple complex had 64 water bodies, of which 56 have been physically identified by archeologists so far.

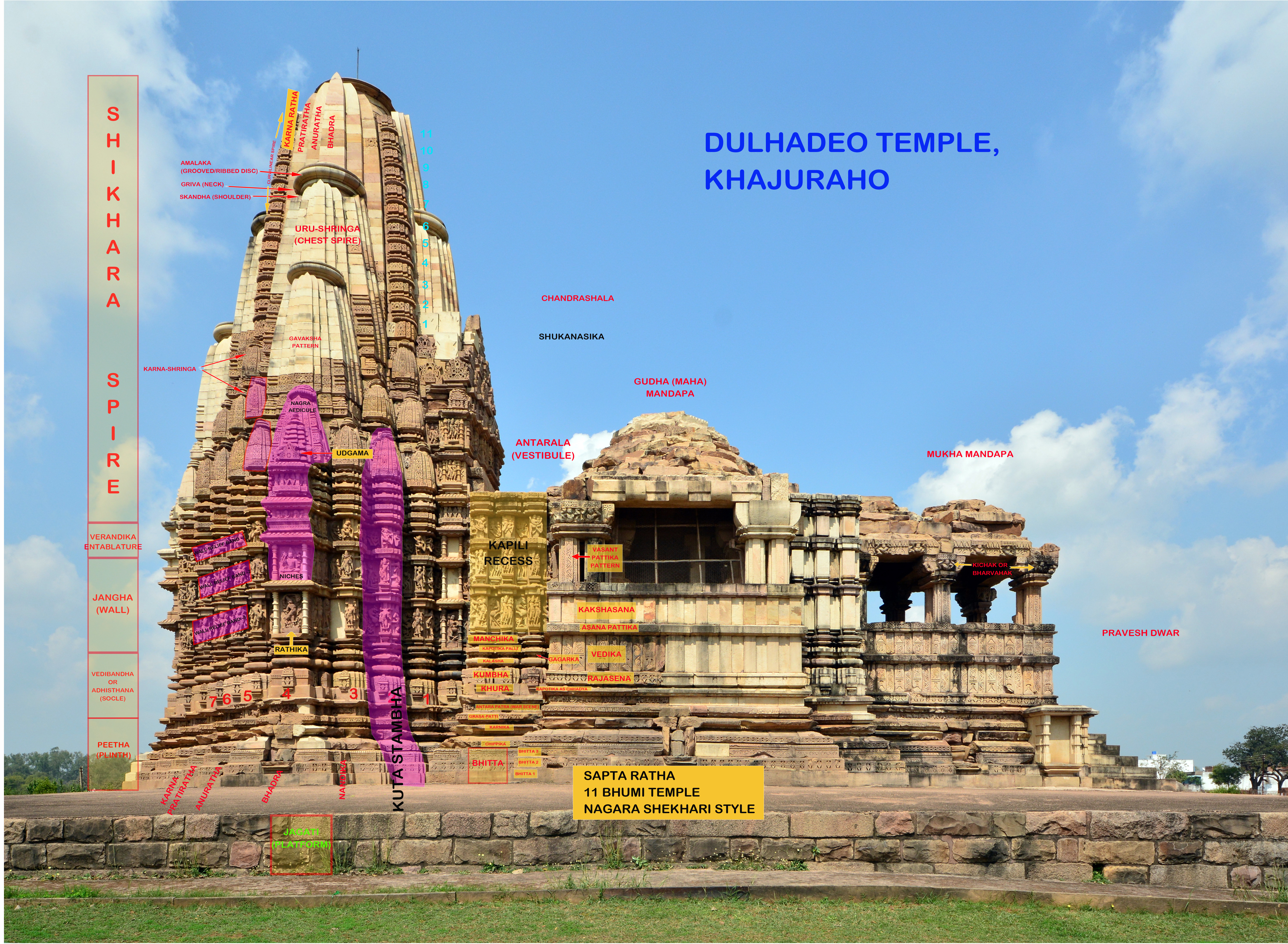
Sections of a Nagara temple architecture in detail

All temples, except one (Chaturbhuja) face the sunrise – another symbolic feature that is predominant in Hindu temples. The relative layout of temples integrate masculine and feminine deities and symbols highlight the interdependence. The artworks symbolically highlight the four goals of life considered necessary and proper in Hinduism – dharma, kama, artha and moksha.

Of the surviving temples, six are dedicated to Shiva, eight to Vishnu and his affinities, one to Ganesha, one to Sun god, three to Jain Tirthankars. For some ruins, there is insufficient evidence to assign the temple to specific deities with confidence.

An overall examination of site suggests that the Hindu symbolic mandala design principle of square and circles is present each temple plan and design. Further, the territory is laid out in three triangles that converge to form a pentagon. Scholars suggest that this reflects the Hindu symbolism for three realms or trilokinatha, and five cosmic substances or panchbhuteshvara. The temple site highlights Shiva, the one who destroys and recycles life, thereby controlling the cosmic dance of time, evolution and dissolution.

The temples have a rich display of intricately carved statues. While they are famous for their erotic sculpture, sexual themes cover less than 10% of the temple sculpture. Further, most erotic scene panels are neither prominent nor emphasized at the expense of the rest, rather they are in proportional balance with the non-sexual images. The viewer has to look closely to find them, or be directed by a guide. The arts cover numerous aspects of human life and values considered important in the Hindu pantheon. Further, the images are arranged in a configuration to express central ideas of Hinduism. All three ideas from Āgamas are richly expressed in Khajuraho temples – Avyakta, Vyaktavyakta and Vyakta.

The Beejamandal temple is under excavation. It has been identified with the Vaidyanath temple mentioned in the Grahpati Kokalla inscription.

Of all temples, the Matangeshvara temple remains an active site of worship. It is another square grid temple, with a large 2.5 metres (8.2 ft) high and 1.1 metres (3.6 ft) diameter lingam, placed on a 7.6 metres (25 ft) diameter platform.

The most visited temple, Kandariya Mahadev, has an area of about 6,500 square feet and a shikhara (spire) that rises 116 feet.

=== Jain temples ===
The Jain temples are located on east-southeast region of Khajuraho monuments.

The Eastern Group consists of four major Digambara Jaina temples: the ruined Ghantai Temple, the Pārśvanātha Temple, the Ādinātha Temple, and the Śāntinātha Temple, along with several smaller Jaina shrines. Many of these shrines were built on the foundations of earlier structures or using materials from previous temples.

There are numerous strong indications within the architecture of the Pārśvanātha and Ādinātha Temples that they were originally constructed as Hindu temples and later converted into Jaina temples by the Jaina community.

Chausath yogini temple features 64 yogini, while Ghantai temple features bells sculptured on its pillars.

=== Architecture of the temples ===
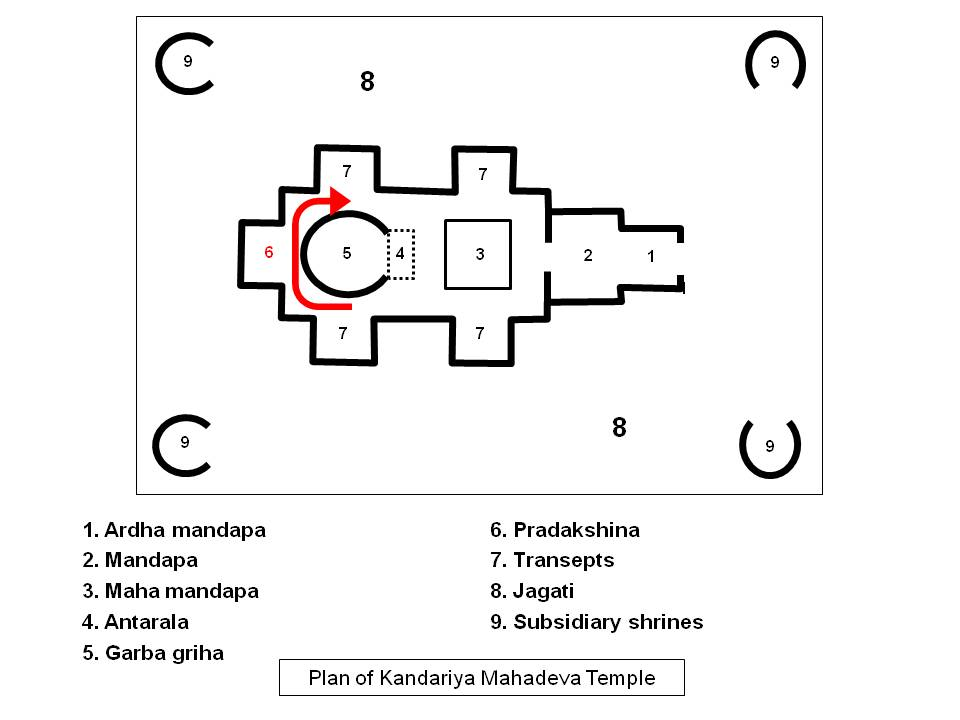
The layout plan of Kandariya Mahadeva Temple. It uses the 64 pada grid design. Smaller Khajuraho temples use the 9, 16, 36 or 49 grid mandala plan.

Khajuraho temples, almost all Hindu temple designs, follow a grid geometrical design called vastu-purusha-mandala. This design plan has three important components – Mandala means circle, Purusha is universal essence at the core of Hindu tradition, while Vastu means the dwelling structure.

The design lays out a Hindu temple in a symmetrical, concentrically layered, self-repeating structure around the core of the temple called garbhagriya, where the abstract principle Purusha and the primary deity of the temple dwell. The shikhara, or spire, of the temple rises above the garbhagriya. This symmetry and structure in design is derived from central beliefs, myths, cardinality and mathematical principles.

The circle of mandala circumscribe the square. The square is considered divine for its perfection and as a symbolic product of knowledge and human thought, while circle is considered earthly, human and observed in everyday life (moon, sun, horizon, water drop, rainbow). Each supports the other. The square is divided into perfect 64 sub-squares called padas.

Most Khajuraho temples deploy the 8x8 (64) padas grid Manduka Vastupurushamandala, with pitha mandala the square grid incorporated in the design of the spires. The primary deity or lingas are located in the grid's Brahma padas.

Khajuraho temples use the 8×8 (64) Vastupurusamandala Manduka grid layout plan (left) found in Hindu temples. Above the temple’s brahma padas is a Shikhara (Vimana or Spire) that rises symmetrically above the central core, typically in a circles and turning-squares concentric layering design (right) that flows from one to the other as it rises towards the sky.

The architecture is symbolic and reflects the central Hindu beliefs through its form, structure, and arrangement of its parts. The mandapas, as well as the arts, are arranged in the Khajuraho temples in a symmetric repeating patterns, even though each image or sculpture is distinctive in its own way. The relative placement of the images are not random but together they express ideas, just like connected words form sentences and paragraphs to compose ideas. This fractal pattern that is common in Hindu temples. Various statues and panels have inscriptions. Many of the inscriptions on the temple walls are poems with double meanings, something that the complex structure of Sanskrit allows in creative compositions.

All Khajuraho temples, except one, face sunrise, and the entrance for the devotee is this east side.

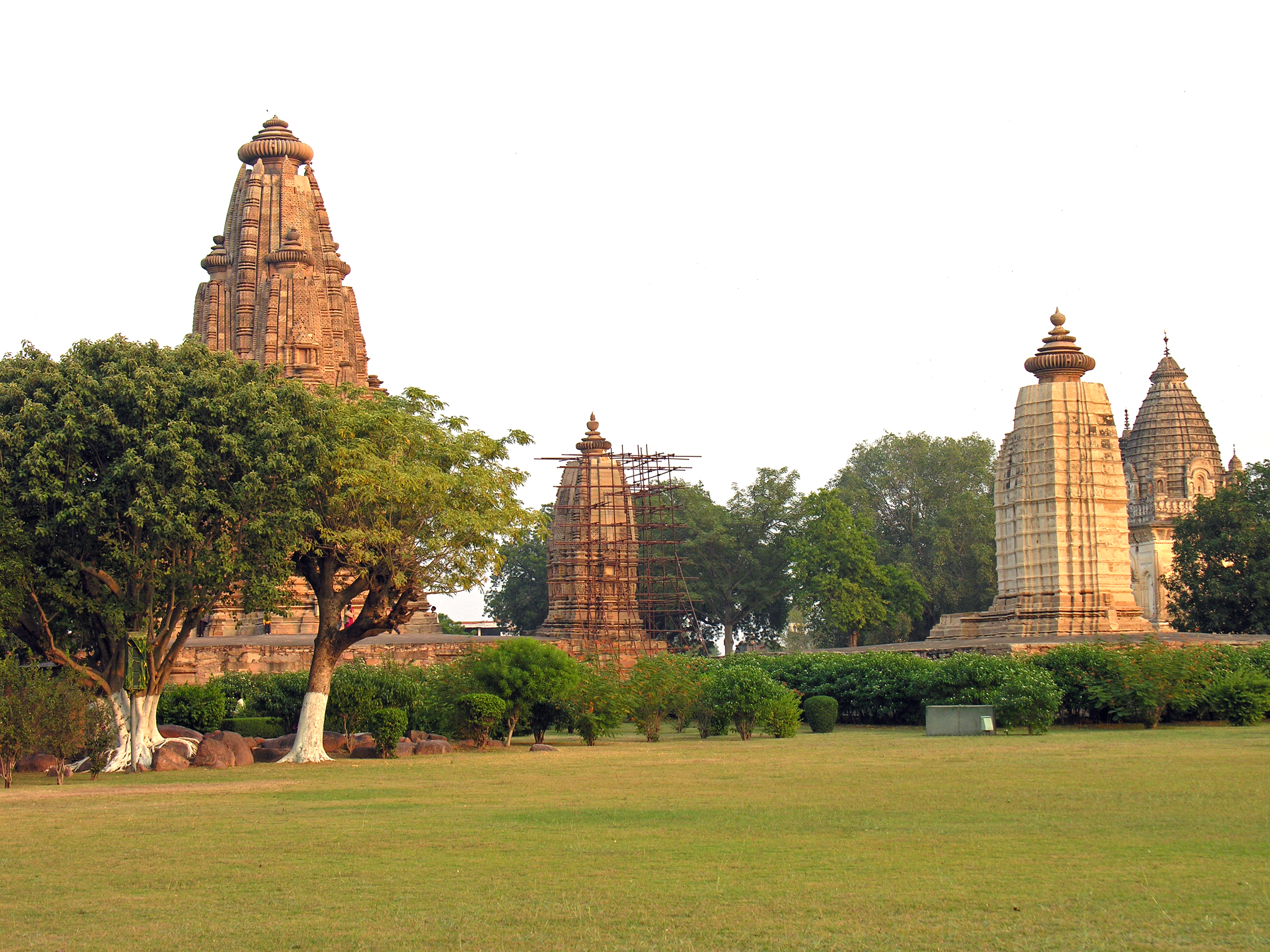
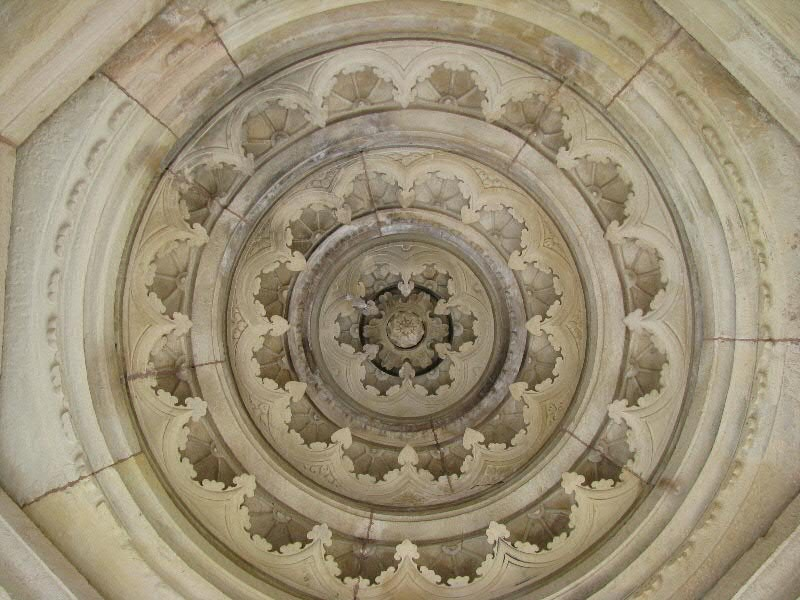
An illustration of Khajuraho temple Spires (Shikhara, Vimana) built using concentric circle and rotating-squares principle. Four spires (left) are shown above, while the inside view of one Shikara ceiling (right) shows the symmetric layout.

Above the vastu-purusha-mandala of each temple is a superstructure with a dome called Shikhara (or Vimana, Spire). Variations in spire design come from variation in degrees turned for the squares. The temple Shikhara, in some literature, is linked to mount Kailash or Meru, the mythical abode of the gods.

In each temple, the central space typically is surrounded by an ambulatory for the pilgrim to walk around and ritually circumambulate the Purusa and the main deity. The pillars, walls, and ceilings around the space, as well as outside have highly ornate carvings or images of the four just and necessary pursuits of life – kama, artha, dharma, and moksa. This clockwise walk around is called pradakshina.

Larger Khajuraho temples also have pillared halls called mandapa. One near the entrance, on the east side, serves as the waiting room for pilgrims and devotees. The mandapas are also arranged by principles of symmetry, grids, and mathematical precision. This use of same underlying architectural principle is common in Hindu temples found all over India. Each Khajuraho temple is distinctly carved yet also repeating the central common principles in almost all Hindu temples, one which Susan Lewandowski refers to as "an organism of repeating cells".

== Construction ==
The temples are grouped into three geographical divisions: western, eastern and southern.

The Khajuraho temples are made of sandstone, with a granite foundation that is almost concealed from view. The builders didn't use mortar: the stones were put together with mortise and tenon joints and they were held in place by gravity. This form of construction requires very precise joints. The columns and architraves were built with megaliths that weighed up to 20 tons. Some repair work in the 19th Century was done with brick and mortar; however, these have aged faster than original materials and darkened with time, thereby seeming out of place.

The Khajuraho and Kalinjar region is home to superior quality of sandstone, which can be carved precisely. The surviving sculpture reflect fine details such as strands of hair, manicured nails, and intricate jewelry.

While recording the television show Lost Worlds (History Channel) at Khajuraho, Alex Evans recreated a stone sculpture under four feet that took about 60 days to carve in an attempt to develop a rough idea of how much work must have been involved. Roger Hopkins and Mark Lehner also conducted experiments to quarry limestone which took 12 quarrymen 22 days to quarry about 400 tons of stone. They concluded that these temples would have required hundreds of highly trained sculptors.

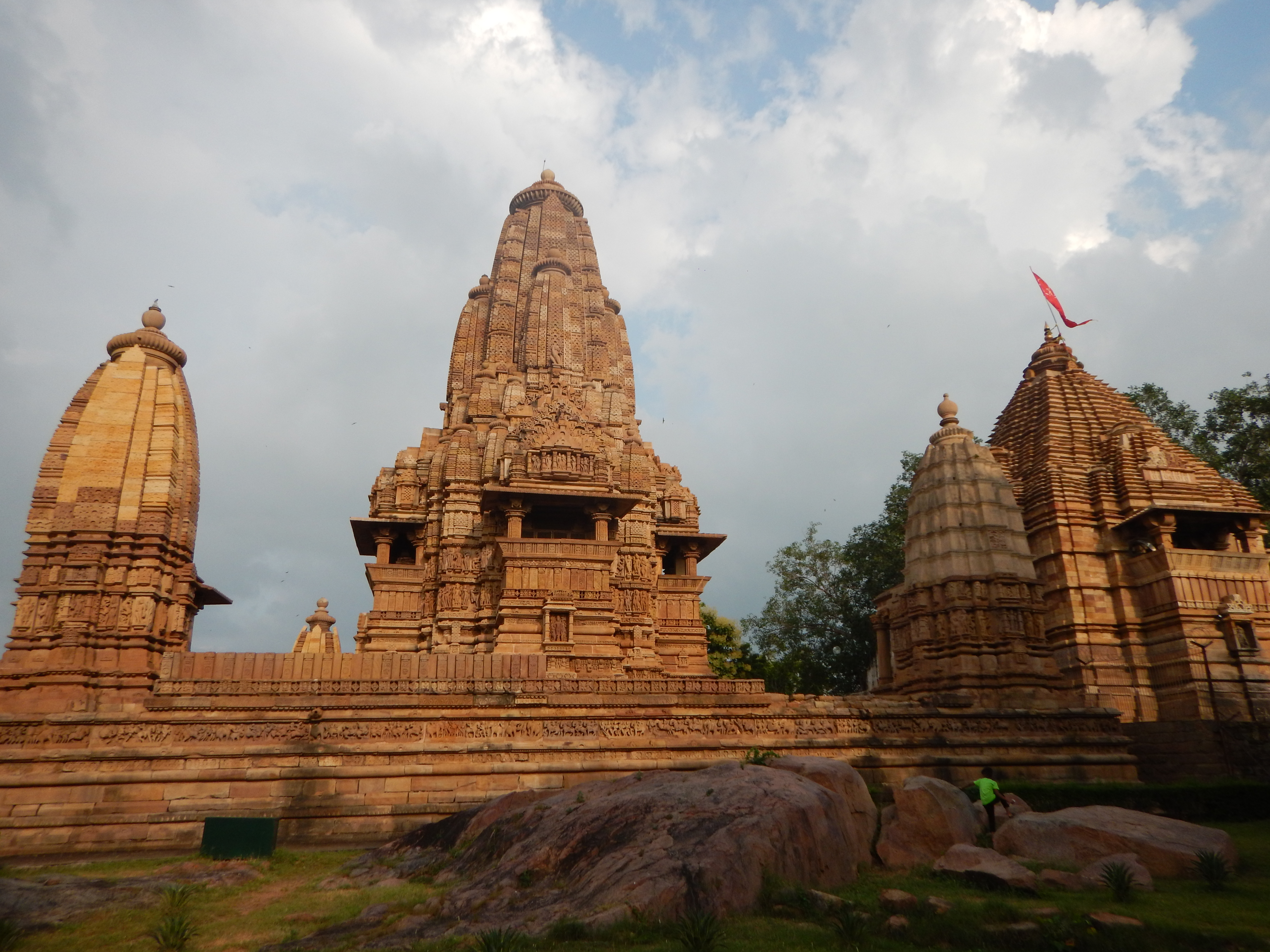
Western side.

== Chronology ==
The Khajuraho group of temples belong to Vaishnavism school of Hinduism, Saivism school of Hinduism and Jainism – nearly a third each. Archaeological studies suggest all three types of temples were under construction at about the same time in the late 10th century, and in use simultaneously. Will Durant states that this aspect of Khajuraho temples illustrates the tolerance and respect for different religious viewpoints in the Hindu and Jain traditions. In each group of Khajuraho temples, there were major temples surrounded by smaller temples – a grid style that is observed to varying degrees in Hindu temples in Angkor Wat, Parambaran and South India.

The largest surviving Shiva temple is Khandarya Mahadeva, while the largest surviving Vaishnava group includes Chaturbhuja and Ramachandra.

Kandariya Mahadeva Temple plan is 109 ft in length by 60 ft, and rises 116 ft above ground and 88 ft above its own floor. The central padas are surrounded by three rows of sculptured figures, with over 870 statues, most being half life size (2.5 to 3 feet). The spire is a self-repeating fractal structure.

Temples, religious affiliations and consecration years
Modern temple name	Religion	Deity	Completed by (CE)	Image
Chausath Yogini	Hinduism	Devi, 64 Yoginis	885	
Lalguan Mahadev	Hinduism	Shiva	900	
Brahma Temple	Hinduism	Shiva	925	
Lakshmana	Hinduism	Vaikuntha Vishnu	939	
Varaha	Hinduism	Varaha	950	
Parshvanatha	Jainism	Parshvanatha	954	
Ghantai	Jainism	Adinatha	960	
Mahishasuramardini	Hinduism	Parvati	995	
Vishvanatha	Hinduism	Shiva	999	
Matangeshwar	Hinduism	Shiva	1000	
Vishnu-Garuda	Hinduism	Vishnu	1000	
Beejamandal Temple ruins	Hinduism	Shiva	1000	
Ganesha	Hinduism	Shiva	1000	
Jagadambi	Hinduism	Devi Jagadambi	1023	
Chitragupta	Hinduism	Chitragupta	1023	
Adinath Temple	Jainism	Adinatha	1027	
Shantinatha temple	Jainism	Shantinatha	1027	
Kandariya Mahadeva (the largest temple)	Hinduism	Shiva	1029	
Vamana	Hinduism	Vamana	1062	
Javeri	Hinduism	Shiva	1090	
Chaturbhuja	Hinduism	Vishnu	1110	
Duladeo (Duladeva)	Hinduism	Shiva	1125	

== Arts and sculpture ==
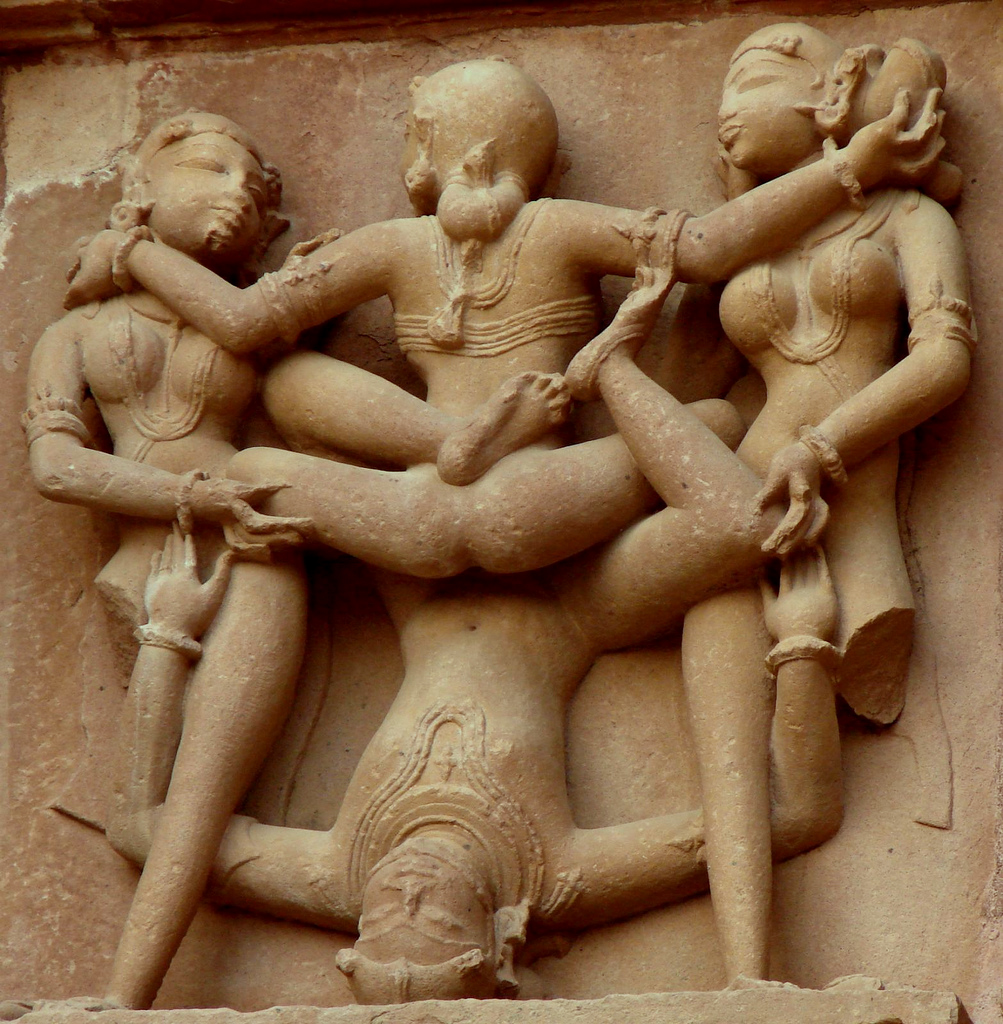
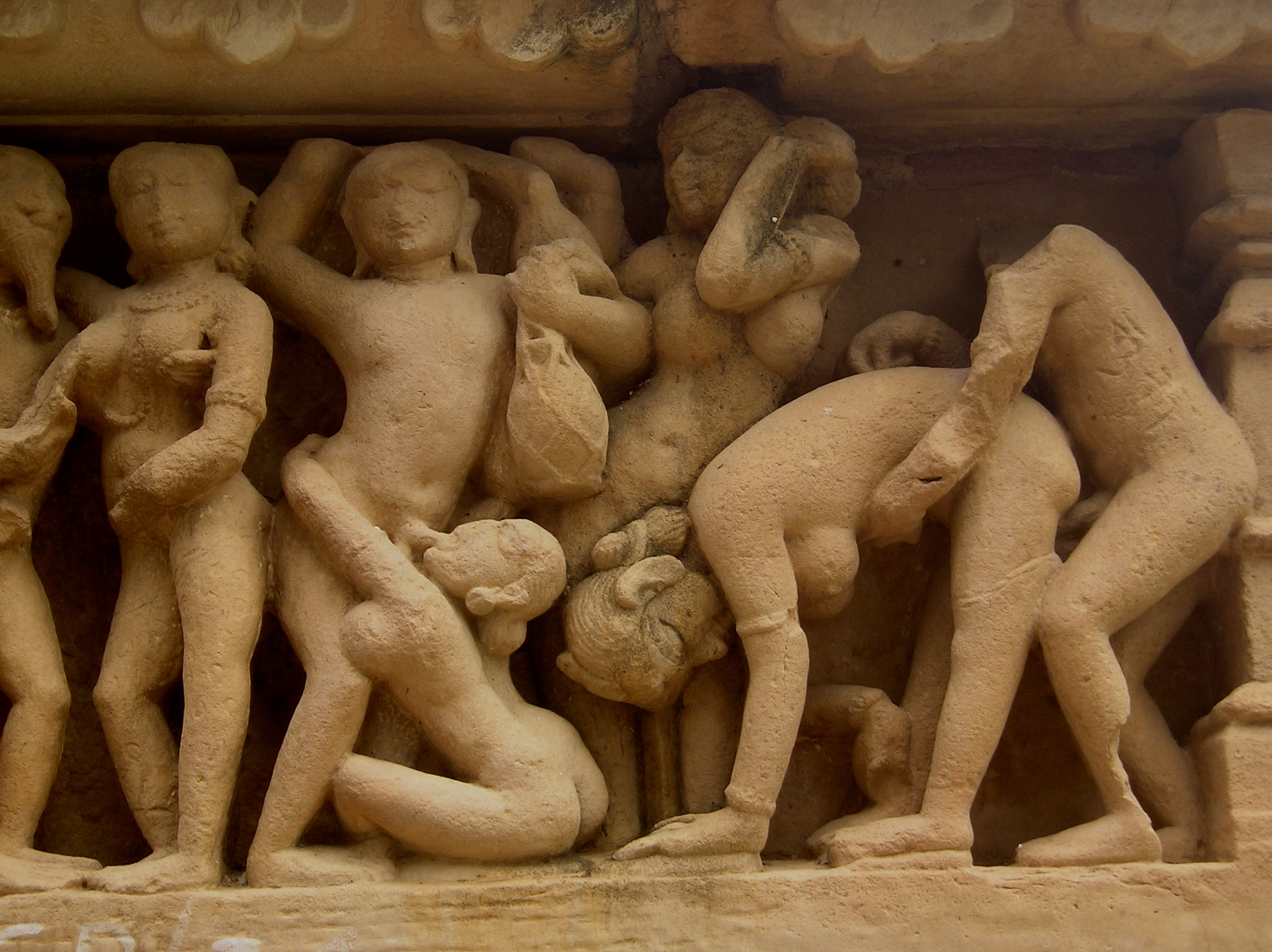
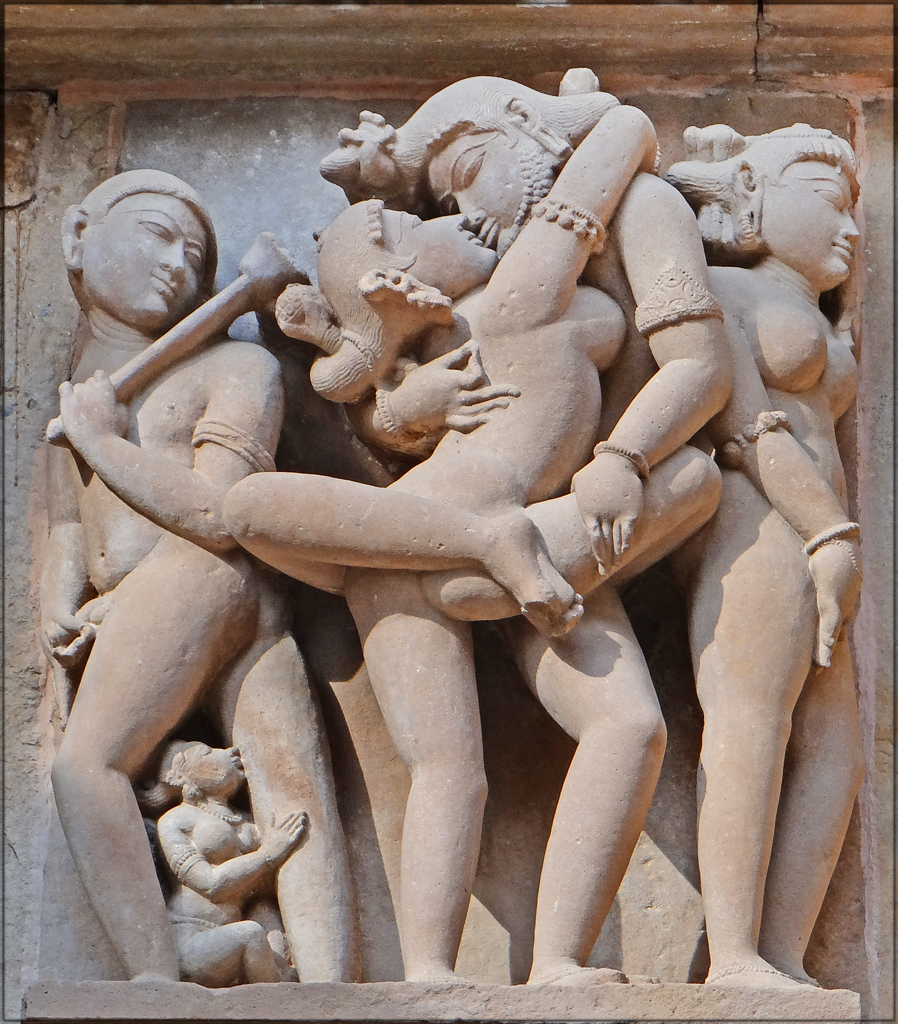
Khajuraho temples are famous for their erotic arts.

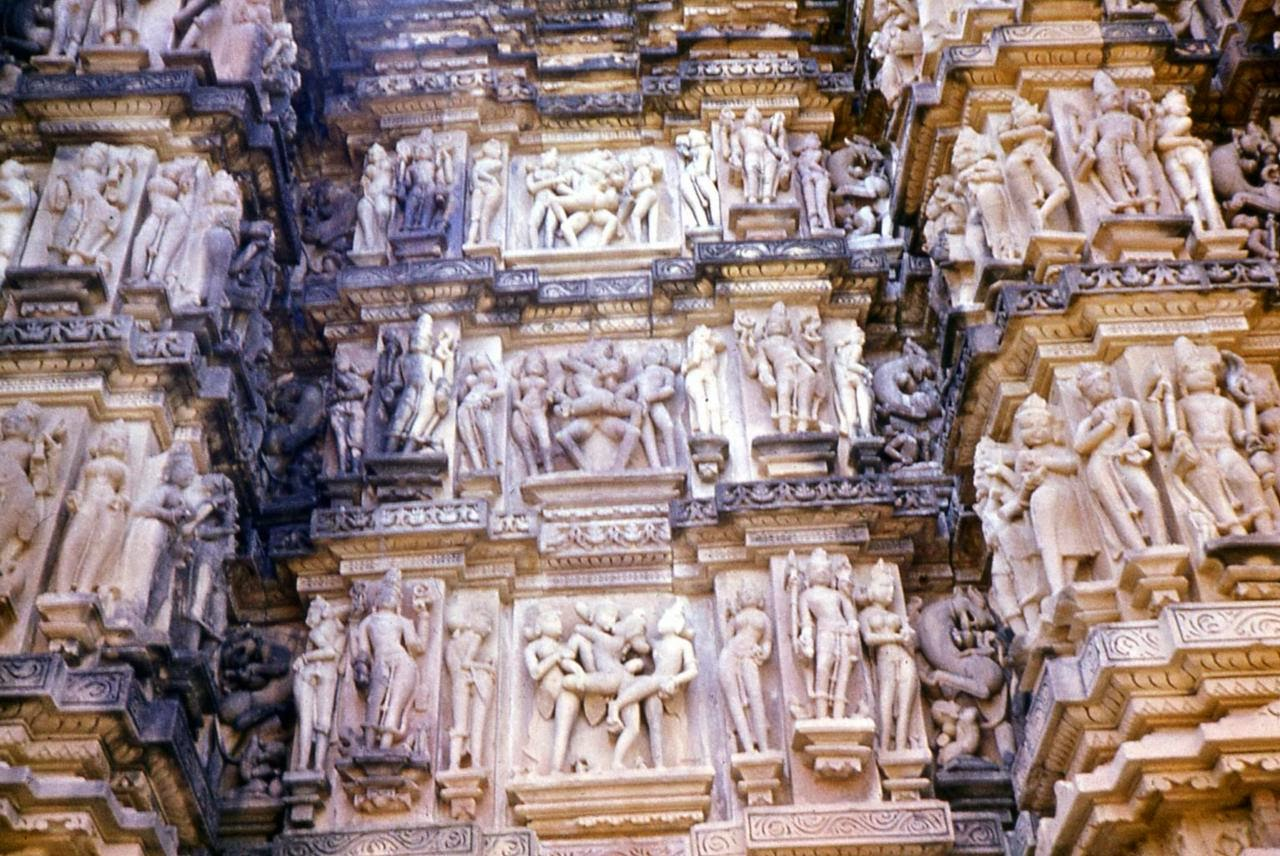
Erotic sculptures

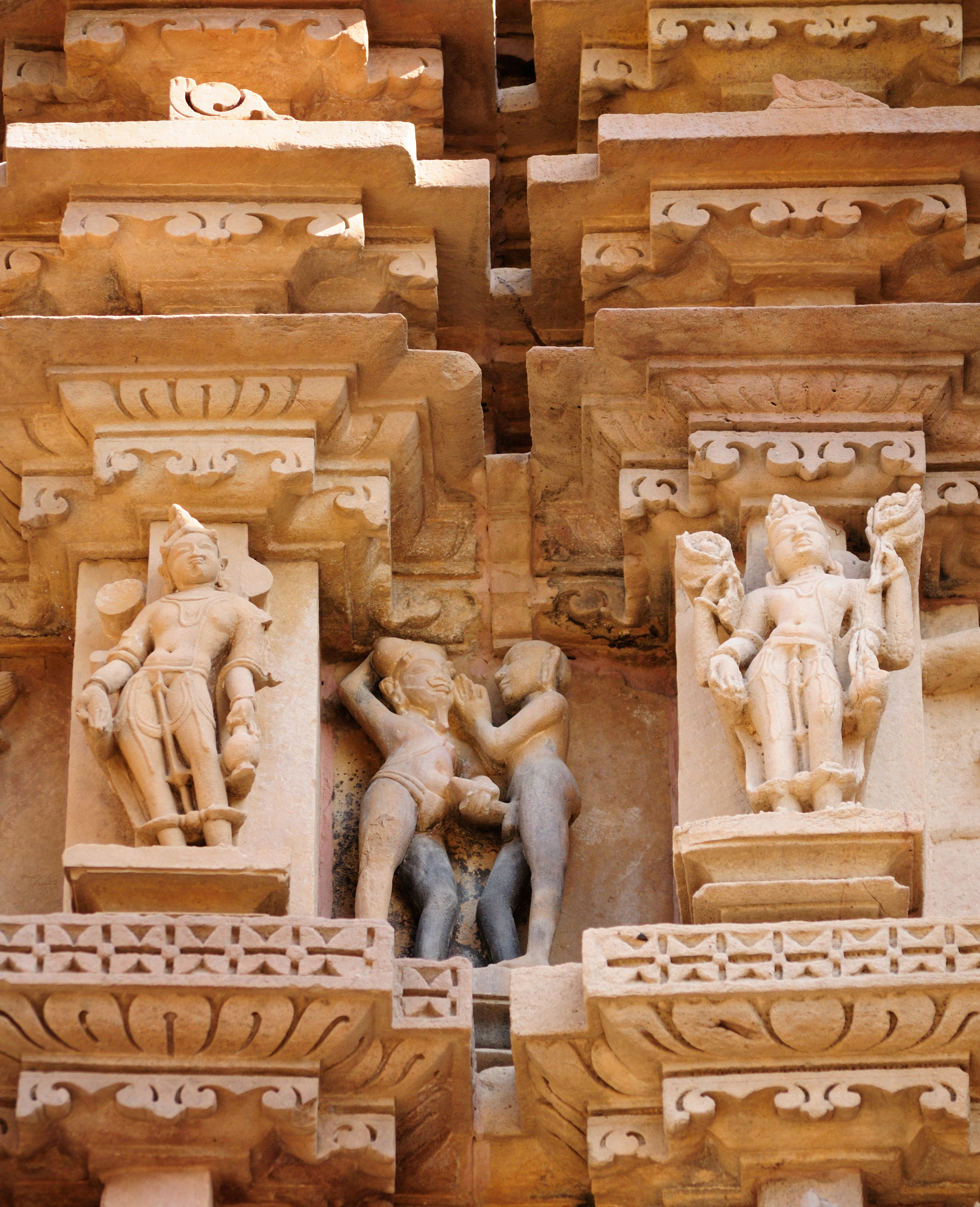
Erotic depiction of two men

The Khajuraho temples feature a variety of artwork, of which 10% is sexual or erotic art outside and inside the temples. Some of the temples that have two layers of walls have small erotic carvings on the outside of the inner wall. Some scholars suggest these to be tantric sexual practices. Other scholars state that the erotic arts are part of the Hindu tradition of treating kama as an essential and proper part of human life, and its symbolic or explicit display is common in Hindu temples. James McConnachie, in his history of the Kamasutra, describes the sexual-themed Khajuraho sculptures as "the apogee of erotic art":

Twisting, broad-hipped and high breasted nymphs display their generously contoured and bejewelled bodies on exquisitely worked exterior wall panels. These fleshy apsaras run riot across the surface of the stone, putting on make-up, washing their hair, playing games, dancing, and endlessly knotting and unknotting their girdles. ... Beside the heavenly nymphs are serried ranks of griffins, guardian deities and, most notoriously, extravagantly interlocked maithunas, or lovemaking couples.

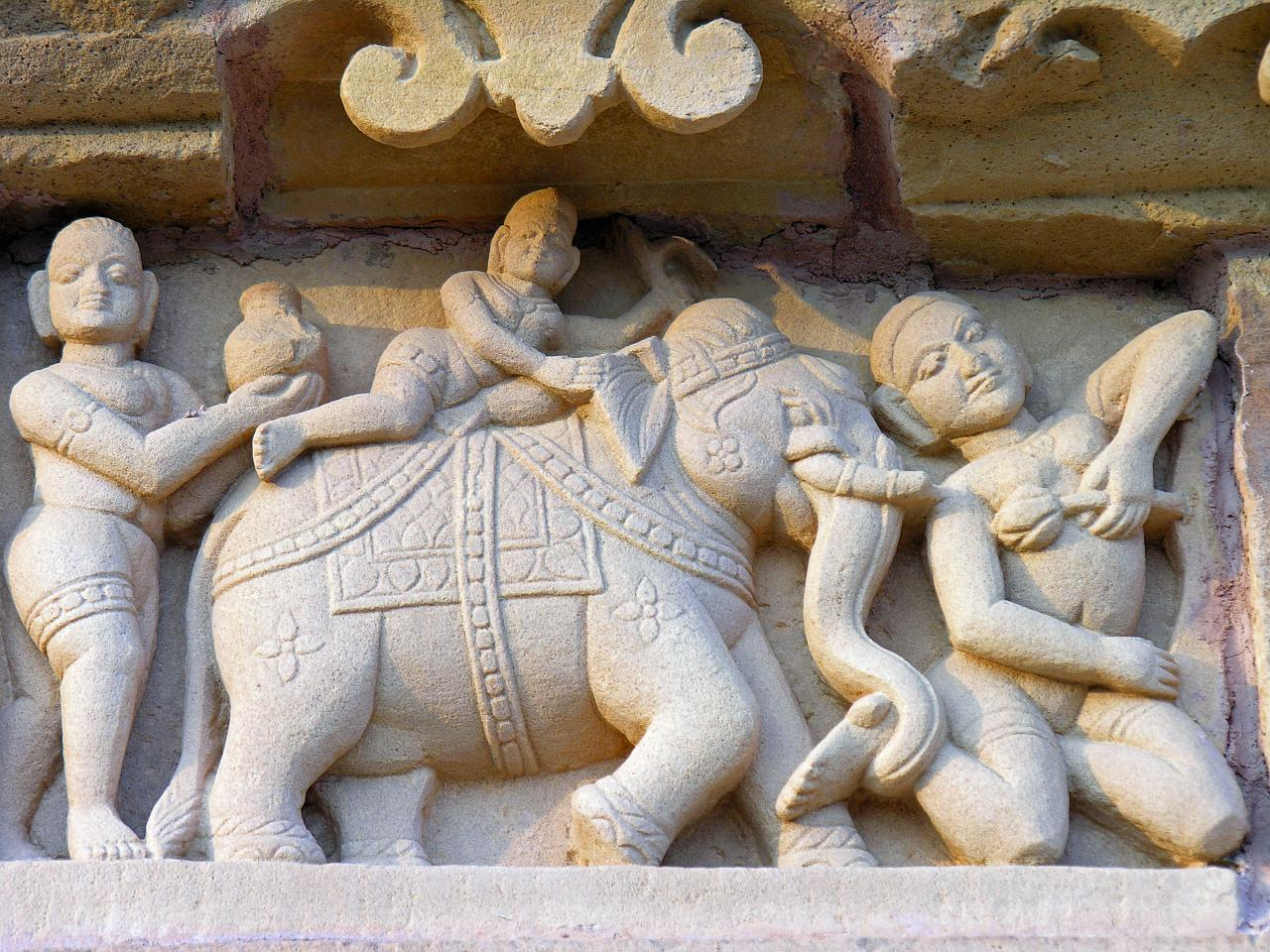
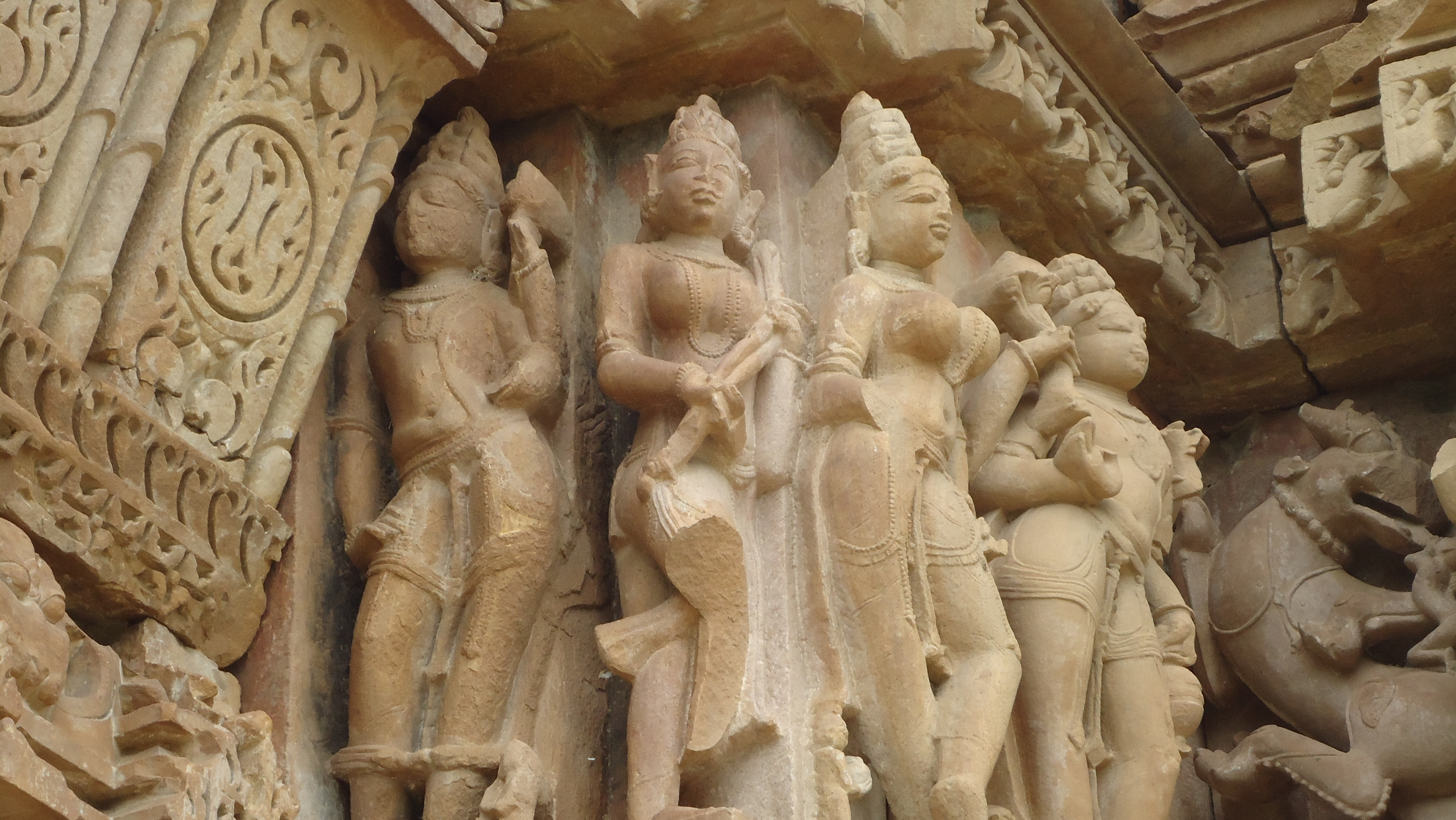
Over 90% of the artwork at the temple is about daily life and symbolic values in ancient Indian culture.

The temples have several thousand statues and artworks, with Kandarya Mahadeva Temple alone decorated with over 870. Some 10% of these iconographic carvings contain sexual themes and various sexual poses. A common misconception is that, since the old structures with carvings in Khajuraho are temples, the carvings depict sex between deities; however, the kama arts represent diverse sexual expressions of different human beings. The vast majority of arts depict various aspects the everyday life, mythical stories as well as symbolic display of various secular and spiritual values important in Hindu tradition. For example, depictions show women putting on makeup, musicians making music, potters, farmers, and other folks in their daily life during the medieval era. These scenes are in the outer padas as is typical in Hindu temples.

There is iconographic symbolism embedded in the arts displayed in Khajuraho temples. Core Hindu values are expressed in multitude of ways. Even the Kama scenes, when seen in combination of sculptures that precede and follow, depict the spiritual themes such as moksha. In the words of Stella Kramrisch,

This state which is "like a man and woman in close embrace" is a symbol of moksa, final release or reunion of two principles, the essence (Purusha) and nature (Prakriti).

— Stella Kramrisch, 1976

The Khajuraho temples represent one expression of many forms of arts that flourished in Rajput kingdoms of India from 8th through 10th century CE. For example, contemporary with Khajuraho were the publications of poems and drama such as Prabodhacandrodaya, Karpuramanjari, Viddhasalabhanjika and Kavyamimansa. Some of the themes expressed in these literary works are carved as sculpture in Khajuraho temples. Some sculptures at the Khajuraho monuments dedicated to Vishnu include the Vyalas, which are hybrid imaginary animals with lions' bodies, and are found in other Indian temples. Some of these hybrid mythical artwork include Vrik Vyala (hybrid of wolf and lion) and Yali (hybrid of elephant and lion). These Vyalas may represent syncretic, creative combination of powers innate in the two.

== Tourism and cultural events ==
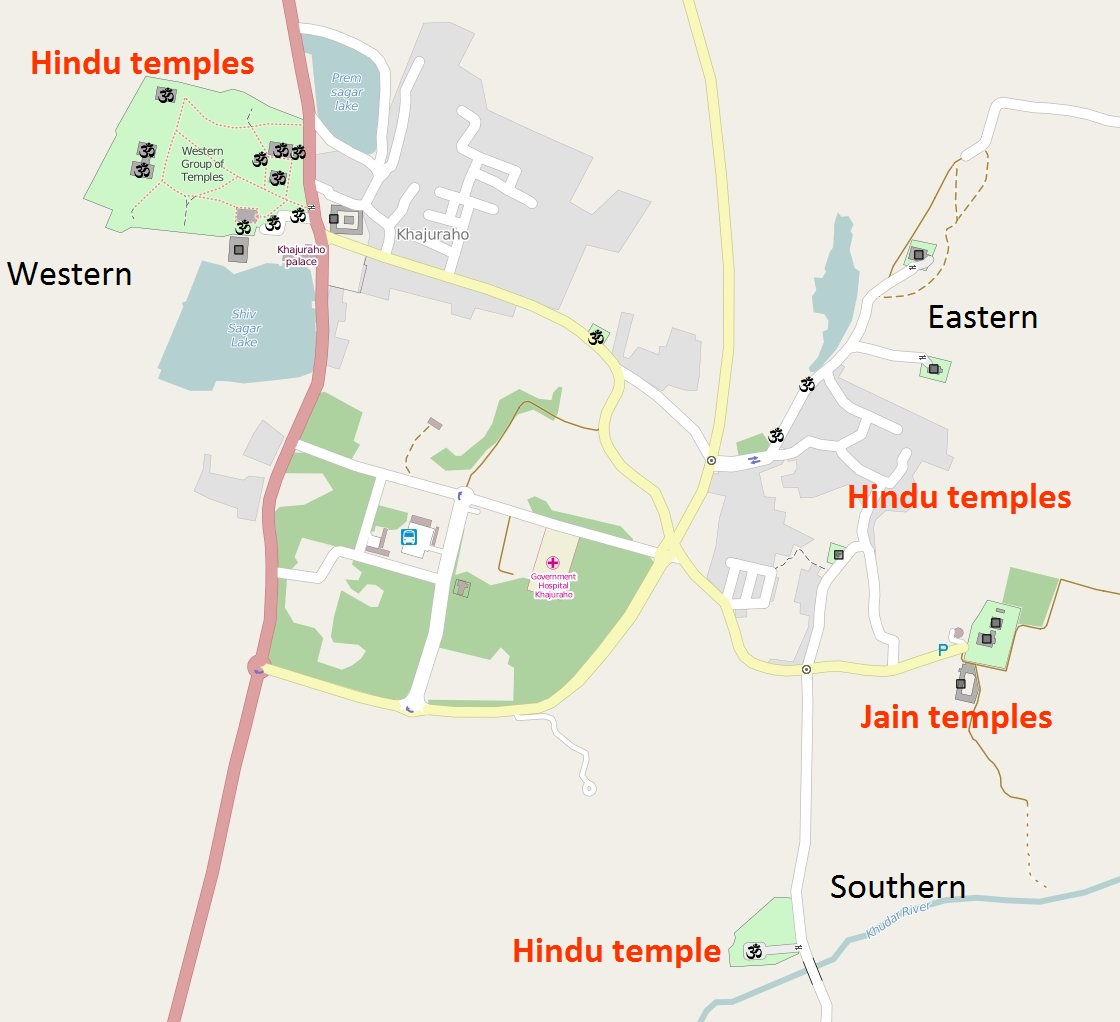
Temples layout map – Khajuraho Group of Monuments.

The temples in Khajuraho are broadly divided into three parts: the Eastern group, the Southern Group and the Western group of temples of which the Western group alone has the facility of an audio-guided tour wherein the tourists are guided through the seven-eight temples. There is also an audio guided tour developed by the Archaeological Survey of India which includes a narration of the temple history and architecture.

The Khajuraho Dance Festival is held every year in February. It features various classical Indian dances set against the backdrop of the Chitragupta or Vishwanath Temples.

The Khajuraho temple complex offers a son et lumière (sound and light) show every evening. The first show is in English language and the second, in Hindi. It is held in the open lawns in the temple complex, and has received mixed reviews.

== See also ==
- List of megalithic sites
- Jain temples of Khajuraho
- Ajanta Caves
- Bhand Deva Temple, called the Little Khajuraho due to similar architecture
- Badami Chalukya architecture
- Western Chalukya architecture
- Hindu temple
- Madan Kamdev
- Hemvati
- Kama Sutra
- Kamashastra
- Khajuraho travel guide from Wikivoyage
