= Ghantai temple =

Ghanti temple

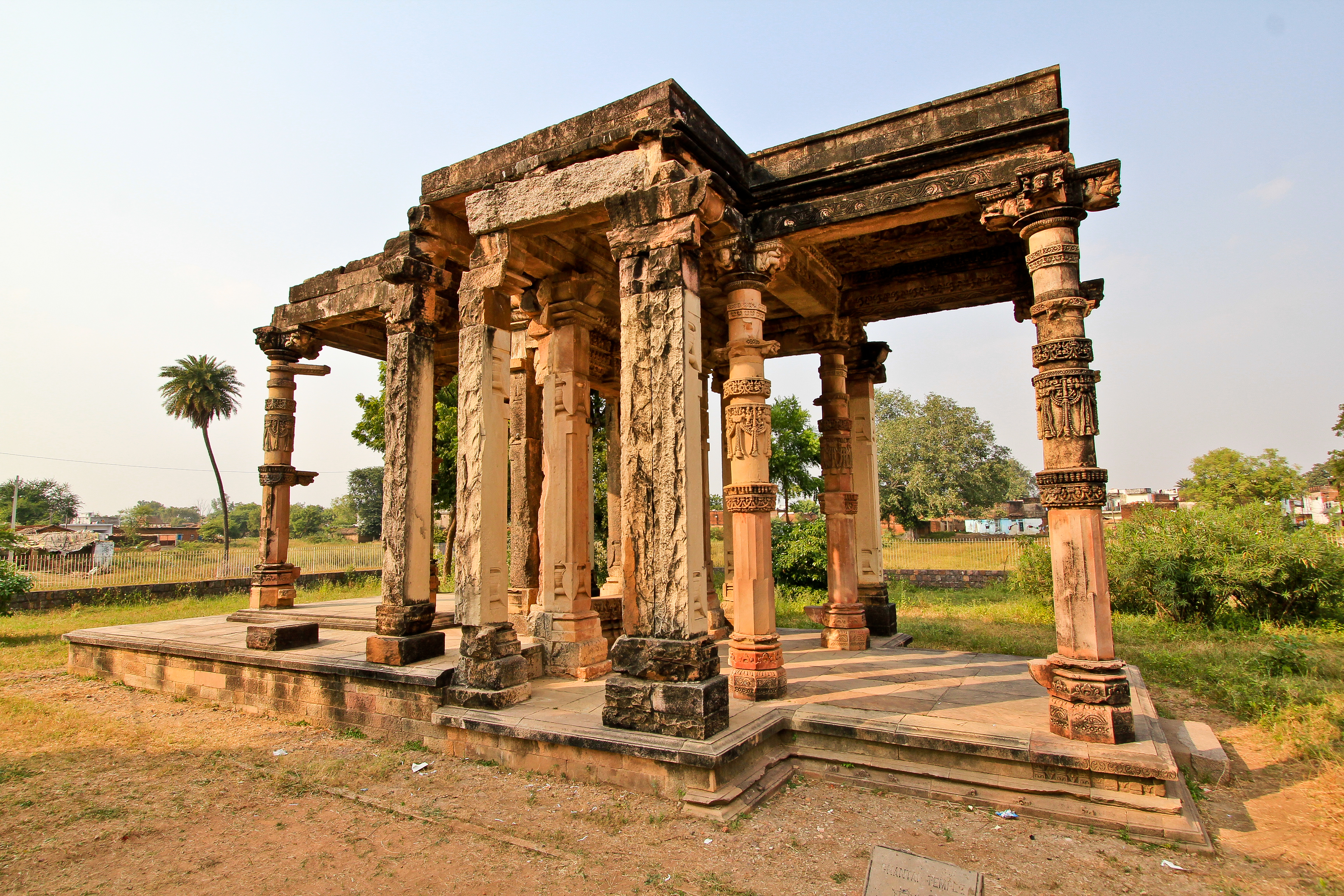

- Location in Madhya Pradesh, India Ghantai temple (India)

Religion
- Affiliation: Jainism
- District: Chhatarpur
- Deity: Rishabhanatha

Location
- Location: Khajuraho
- State: Madhya Pradesh
- Country: India
- Coordinates: 24.8461485°N 79.9333487°E

Architecture
- Established: 10th century CE
- UNESCO World Heritage Site
- Official name: Khajuraho Group of Monuments
- Criteria: Cultural:
- Designated: 1986 (session)
- Reference no.: 240

The Ghantai temple, also known as the Ghanti temple, is a ruined Digambara Jain temple in the Khajuraho town of Madhya Pradesh, India. Similar in style to the Parshvanatha temple, it was dedicated to the Jain tirthankara Rishabhanatha (also known as Adinatha). This temple is part of the UNESCO World Heritage Site along with other temples in Khajuraho Group of Monuments.

== History ==
The construction of the Ghantai temple can be dated to approximately 995 CE, during the reign of the Chandela king Dhanga. It is similar to the Parshvanatha temple, but has a much larger scale, which indicates that it was constructed after the Parshvanatha temple.

When Alexander Cunningham surveyed the temple ruins in the 19th century, he assumed it to be a Buddhist shrine because of a Buddha statue found near the site. However, later studies have established it to be a Jain temple.

The temple has been classified as a Monument of National Importance by the Archaeological Survey of India.

== Architecture ==
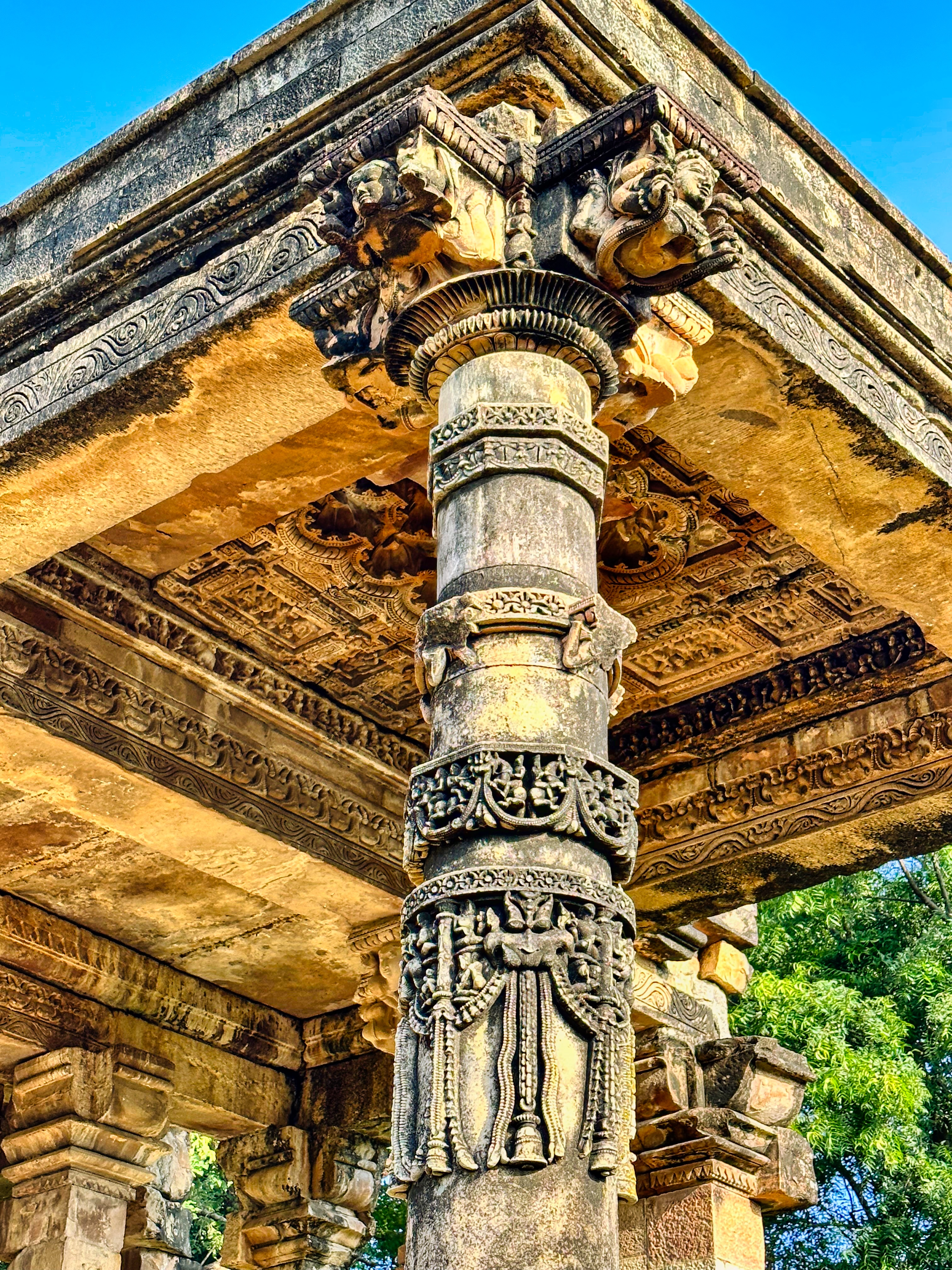
Chain-and-bell (ghanti) motif on the pillar and richly carved ceiling

The design of the Ghantai temple is similar to that of the Parshvanatha temple, although the Ghantai temple is nearly twice the size. The temple is now in ruins: its walls have collapsed. Only the pillars of its entrance porch and its maha-mandapa (large hall) have survived. The maha-mandapa has an elaborate doorway, but the enclosing walls have collapsed.

== Art ==
The surviving pillars feature a chain-and-bell (ghanti) motif, after which the temple is now known. The door lintel of the mandapa features Adinatha's yakshini attendant Chakreshvari. She is depicted as having eight arms and sitting on a garuda. The architrave on the doorway features carvings of six auspicious symbols said to have been dreamt by Mahavira's pregnant mother.

The ceiling of the entrance porch features coffers. The oblong panels bordering the ceiling are carved with figures of dancers and musicians.

A large sculpture, now located at the Khajuraho museum, was found at the Ghantai temple ruins. This sculpture features figures of 52 Jinas, including a central figure of Rishabhanatha standing in kayotsarga pose. The sculpture also features Sarvanubhuti on its left side and a four-armed Chakreshvari on its right side.

== See also ==
- Shantinatha temple, Khajuraho
- Adinatha temple, Khajuraho
