= Frederick Charles Maisey =

British Army general

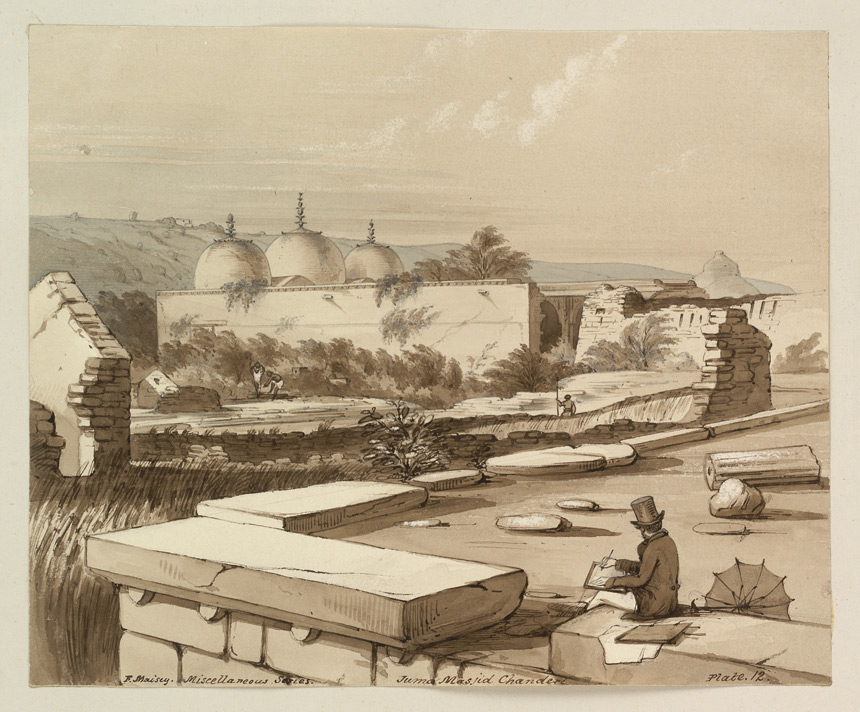
Autoportrait of Frederick Charles Maisey at Juma Masjid, Chanderi in 1850.

Frederick Charles Maisey (1825–1892) was an English army officer, archaeological surveyor and painter, active in India. His main painting technique was pen and ink, and watercolour.

== Early life ==
Maisey was son of Thomas Maisey (1787-1840), of Portland Place, Marylebone, London, a painter and lithographer- sometime drawing master at schools in Cheam and in Kensington- who exhibited at the Royal Academy of Arts and was a founding member (treasurer), later president, of the New Watercolour Society.

== Career ==
Maisey was a lieutenant in the British Army circa 1850 in the Bengal Native Infantry, and participated to the British exploration of India. Maisey was in charge of the excavation of Sanchi in 1851, working with fellow English officer Alexander Cunningham. In 1852 he also made the earliest painting of the Temples at Khajuraho.

Maisey reached the rank of General on December 1, 1888.

His son, also Frederick Charles Maisey, became a lieutenant-colonel, whose career included serving with the 30th Punjab Infantry. In 1895- whilst serving in the campaign to relieve Chitral- he excavated the Buddhist site of Dargai at the southern foot of the Malakand Pass in Pakistan.

== Works ==
- Sánchi and its remains : a full description of the ancient buildings, sculptures, and inscriptions at Sánchi, near Bhilsa, in Central India, with remarks on the evidence they supply as to the comparatively modern date of the Buddhism of Gotama, or Sákya Muni
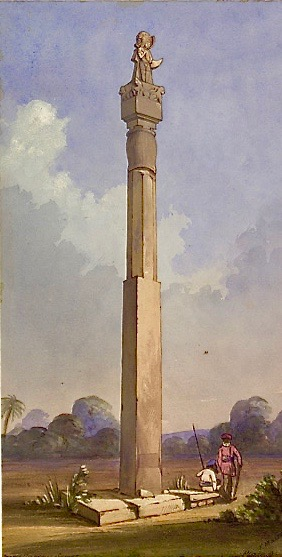
5th century Bhima pillar, Eran. Watercolor by F.C. Maisey, 1850

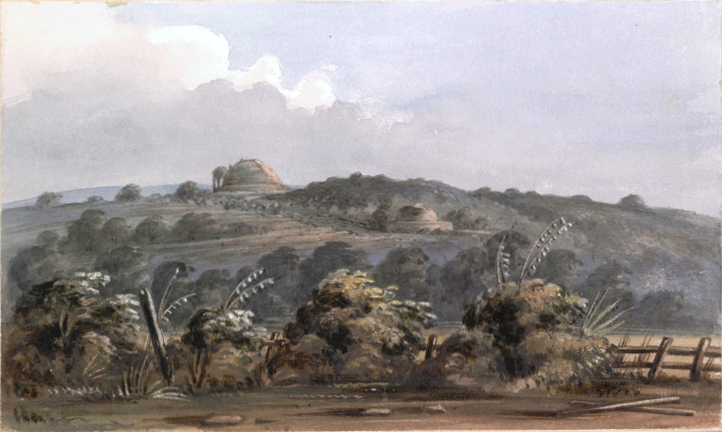
General view of the Stupas at Sanchi, watercolor by F.C. Maisey (The Great Stupa on top of the hill, and Stupa 2 at the forefront)

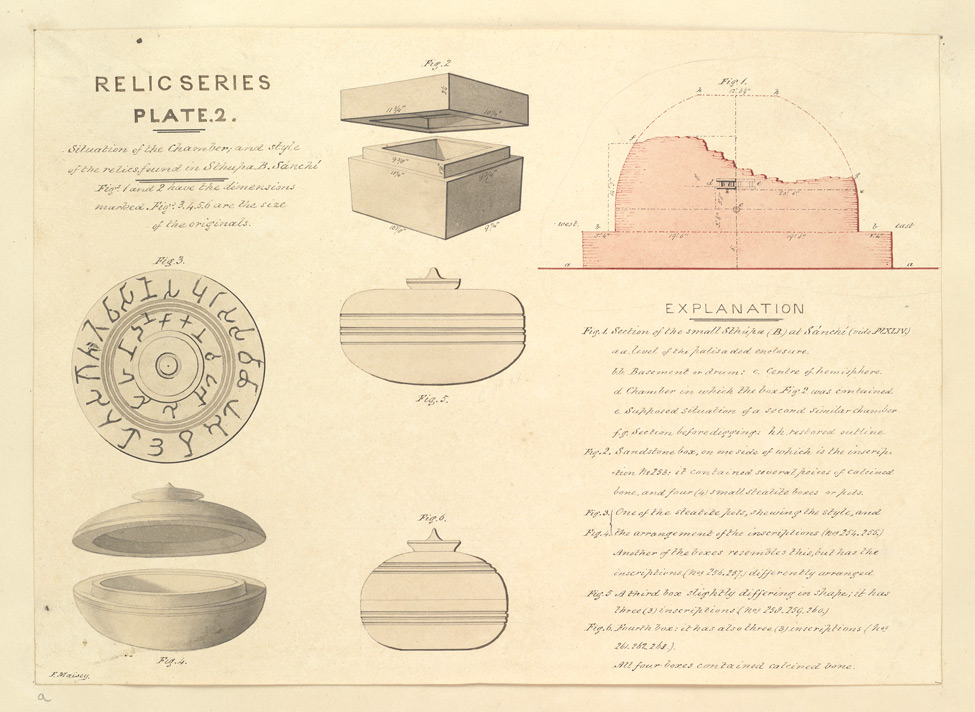
Relics discovered in the excavation of Sanchi Stupa No.2

== See also ==
- List of British Army full generals
