= Lalguan Mahadeva Temple =

Lalguan Mahadeva temple
- लालगुआं मन्दिर
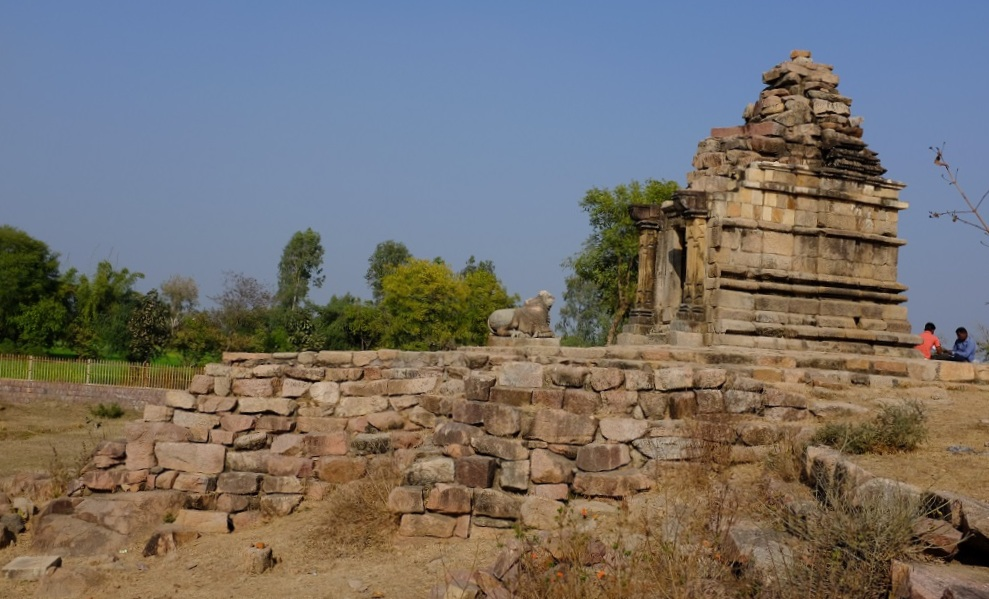

- Location in Madhya Pradesh, India Lalguan Mahadeva Temple (India)

Religion
- Affiliation: Shaivism
- District: Chhatarpur
- Deity: Shiva

Location
- Location: Khajuraho
- State: Madhya Pradesh
- Country: India
- Interactive map of Lalguan Mahadeva temple
- Coordinates: 24.850802°N 79.911269°E

Architecture
- Established: 10th century CE

The Lalguan Mahadeva temple is a ruined Shiva temple in the Khajuraho town of Madhya Pradesh, India.

The construction of the Lalguan Mahadeva temple can be dated to approximately 900 CE. It is the second oldest surviving temple at Khajuraho, after the Chausath Yogini temple. Both the temples are made of granite. The temple seems to have been constructed in a period when sandstone (used in other temples of Khajuraho) was being introduced, but the use of granite had not completely stopped.

The Lalguan temple was built on the bank of a lake, now called Lalguan Sagar. Compared to the later temples of Khajuraho, it is small in size and plain in design. Its plan and design are similar to that of the nearby Brahma temple. It has a pyramid-shaped roof. The only carving on the doorway is a diamond motif.

The temple is now in ruins: the curvilinear tower of its sanctum has fallen, and the entrance porch had disappeared. The building has been classified as a Monument of National Importance by the Archaeological Survey of India. As part of the Khajuraho Group of Monuments, the temple was inscribed on the UNESCO World Heritage List in 1986.
