= Satdhara =

- Satdhara
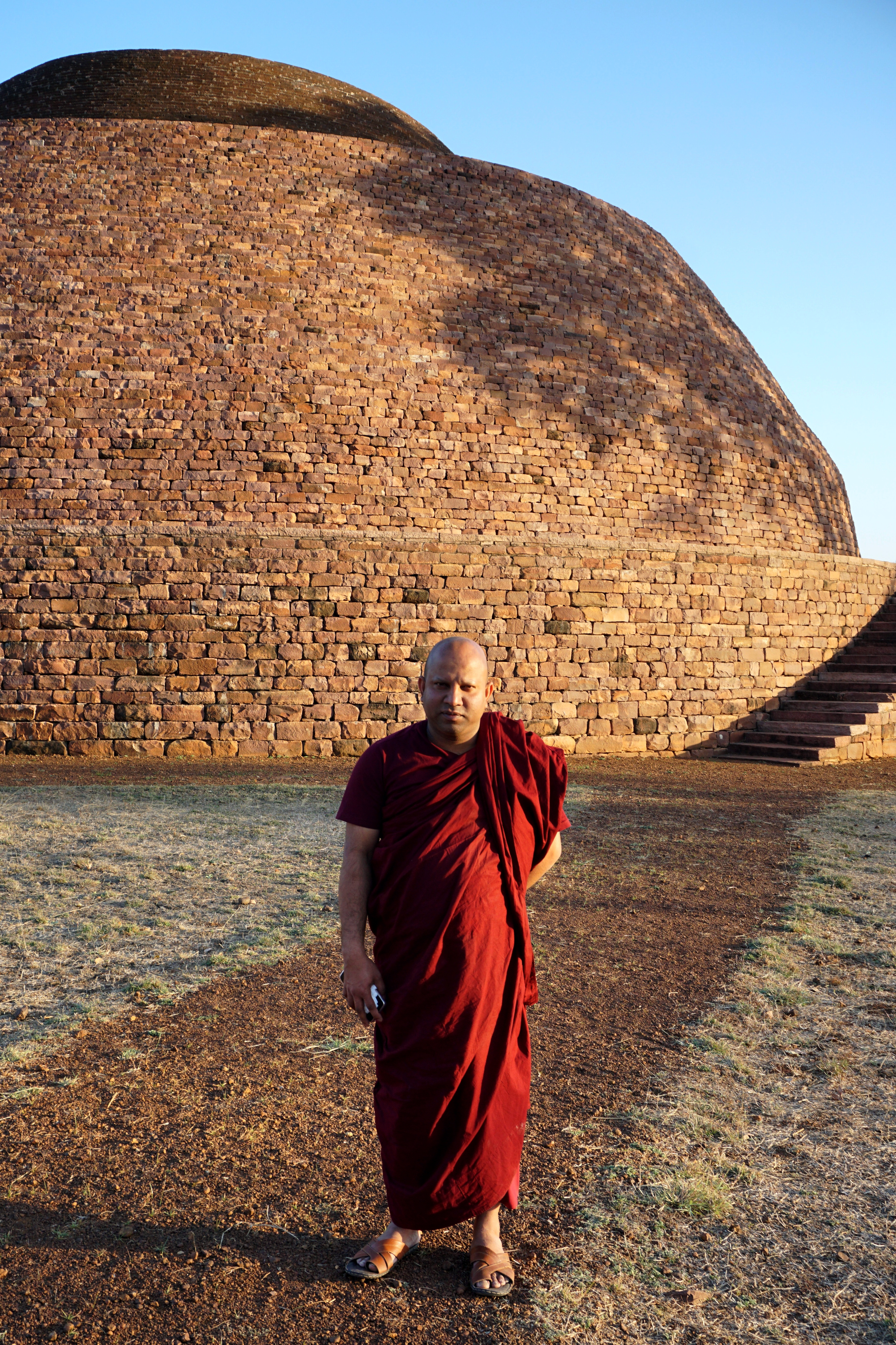
- A Buddhist monk in front of the great stupa of Satdhara.

- Location within India Location within Madhya Pradesh
- 23°29′13″N 77°39′5″E
- Type: Buddhist settlement

Satdhara is an archaeological site, consisting of stupas and viharas, located 9 km (5.6 mi) west of Sanchi, Madhya Pradesh, India.

There are four groups of stupas surrounding Sanchi, within a radius of twenty kilometers: Bhojpur and Andher in the southeast, Sonari to the southwest, and Satdhara to the west. Further south, about 100 km away, is Saru Maru.

All these stupas were found by Major Cunningham, who took the relics found in the center of the stupas to England. He donated them to the British Museum and the Victoria and Albert Museum.

== Gallery ==
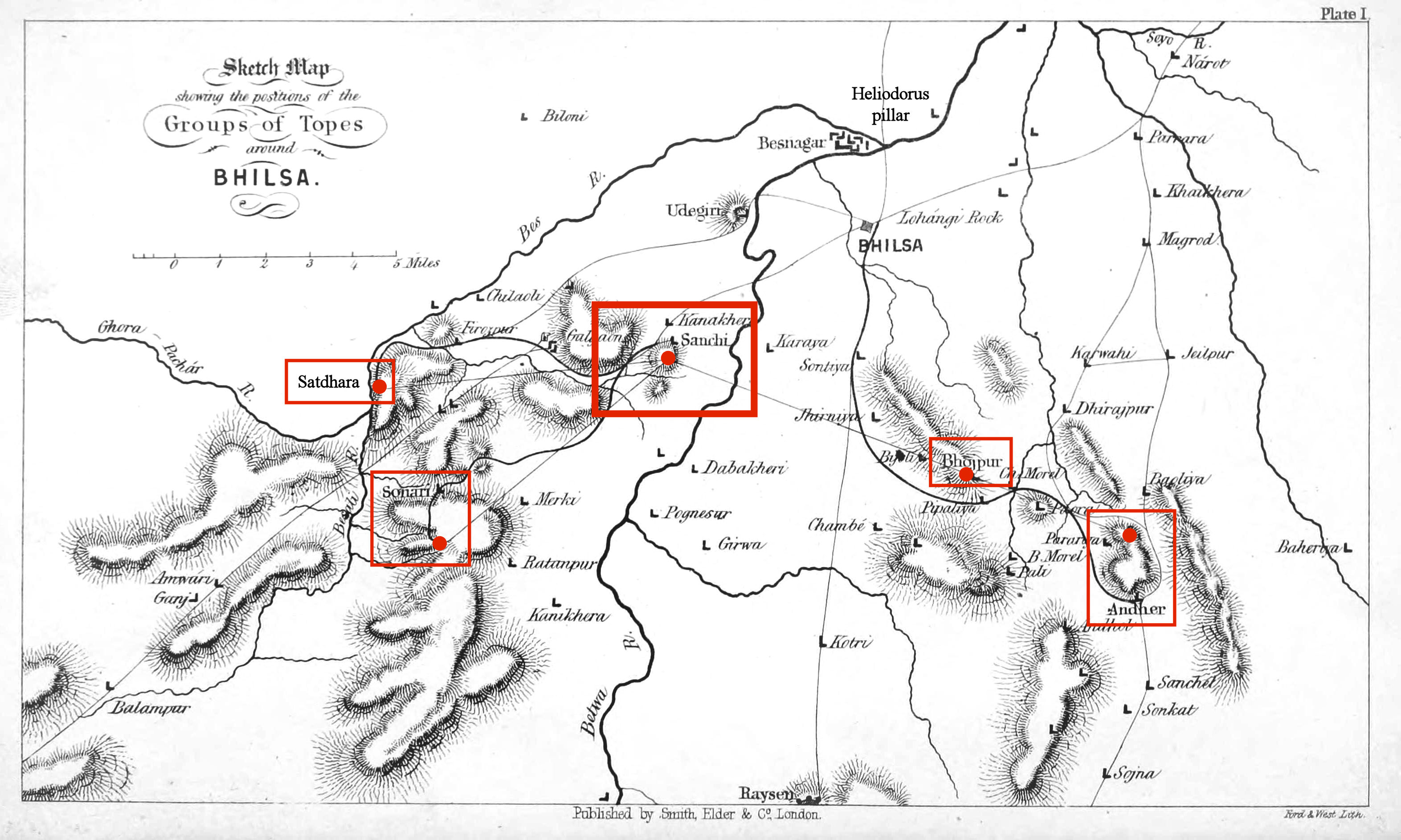
Sanchi and surrounding stupas.

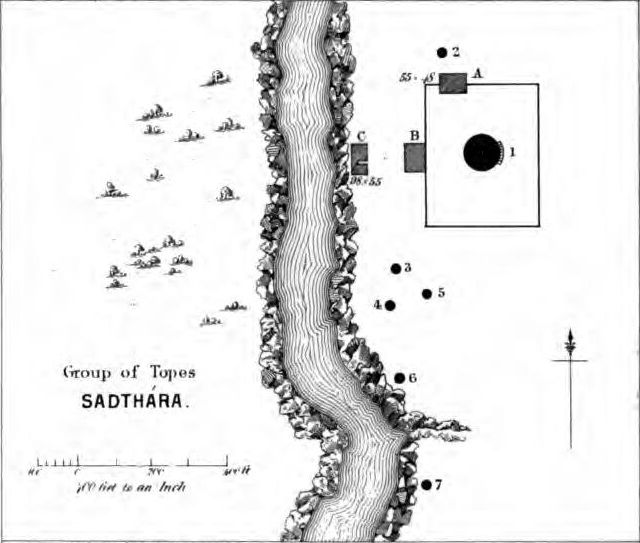
Map of the stupas in Satdhara.

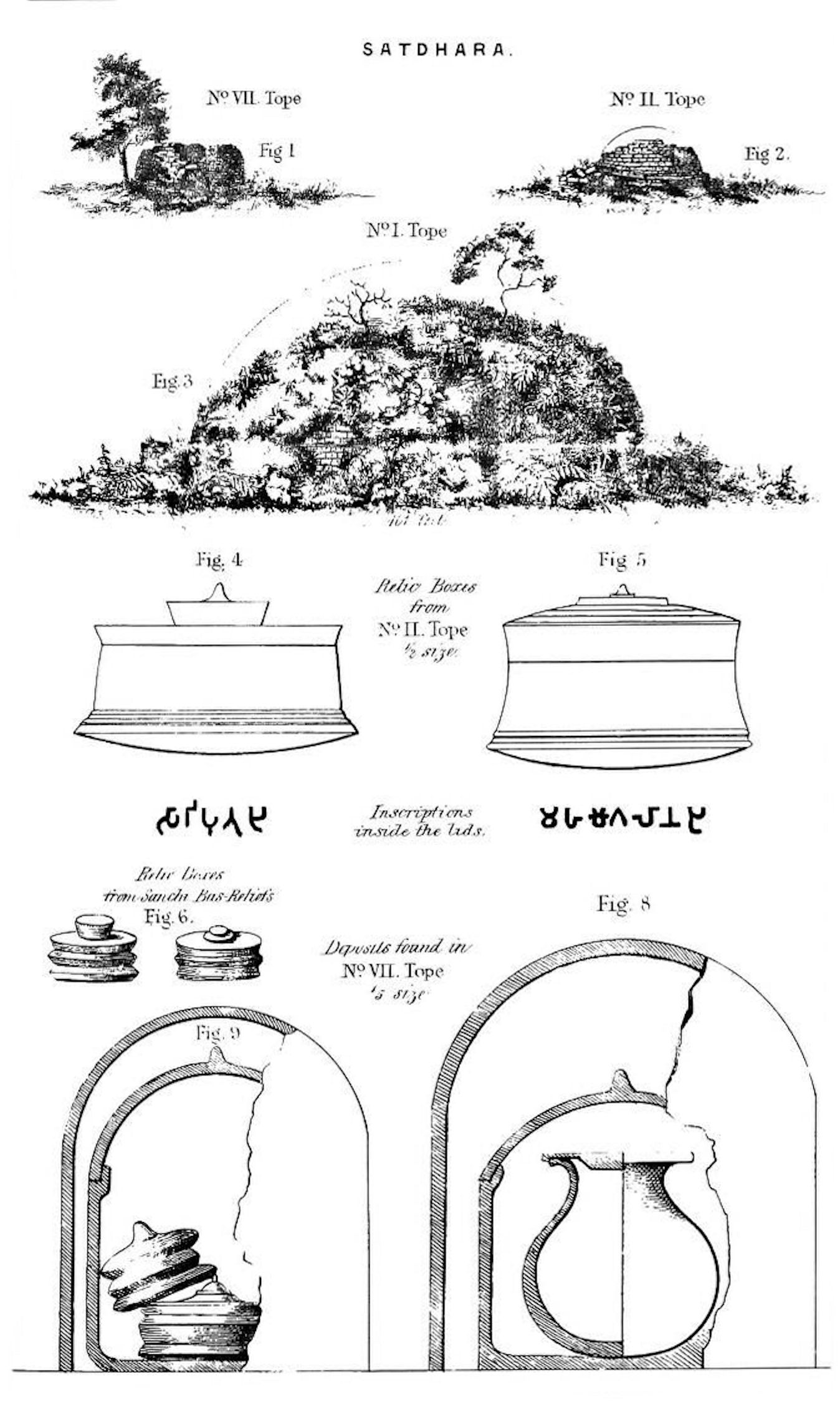
Great stupa, reliquary and inscriptions.

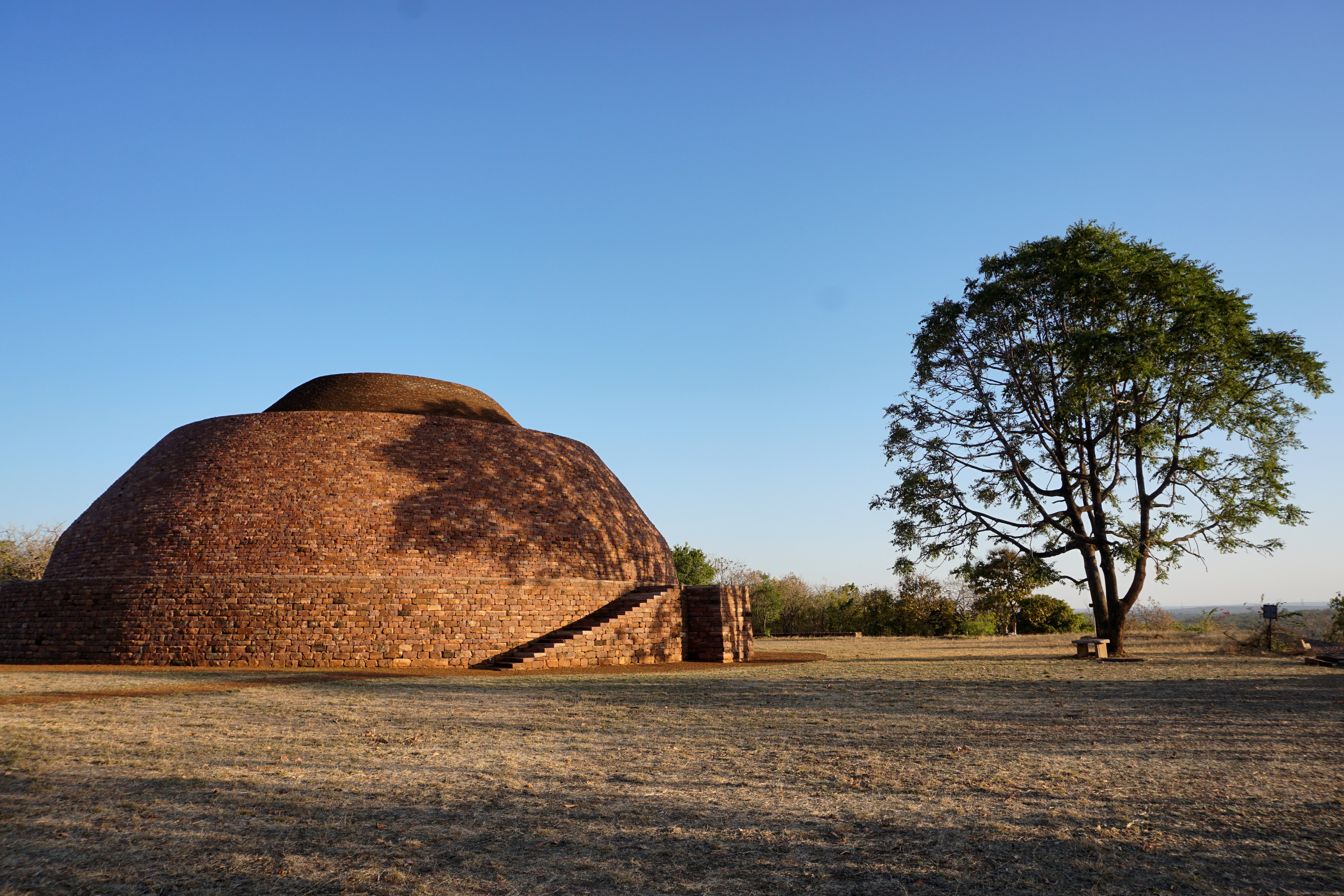
The Great Stupa.

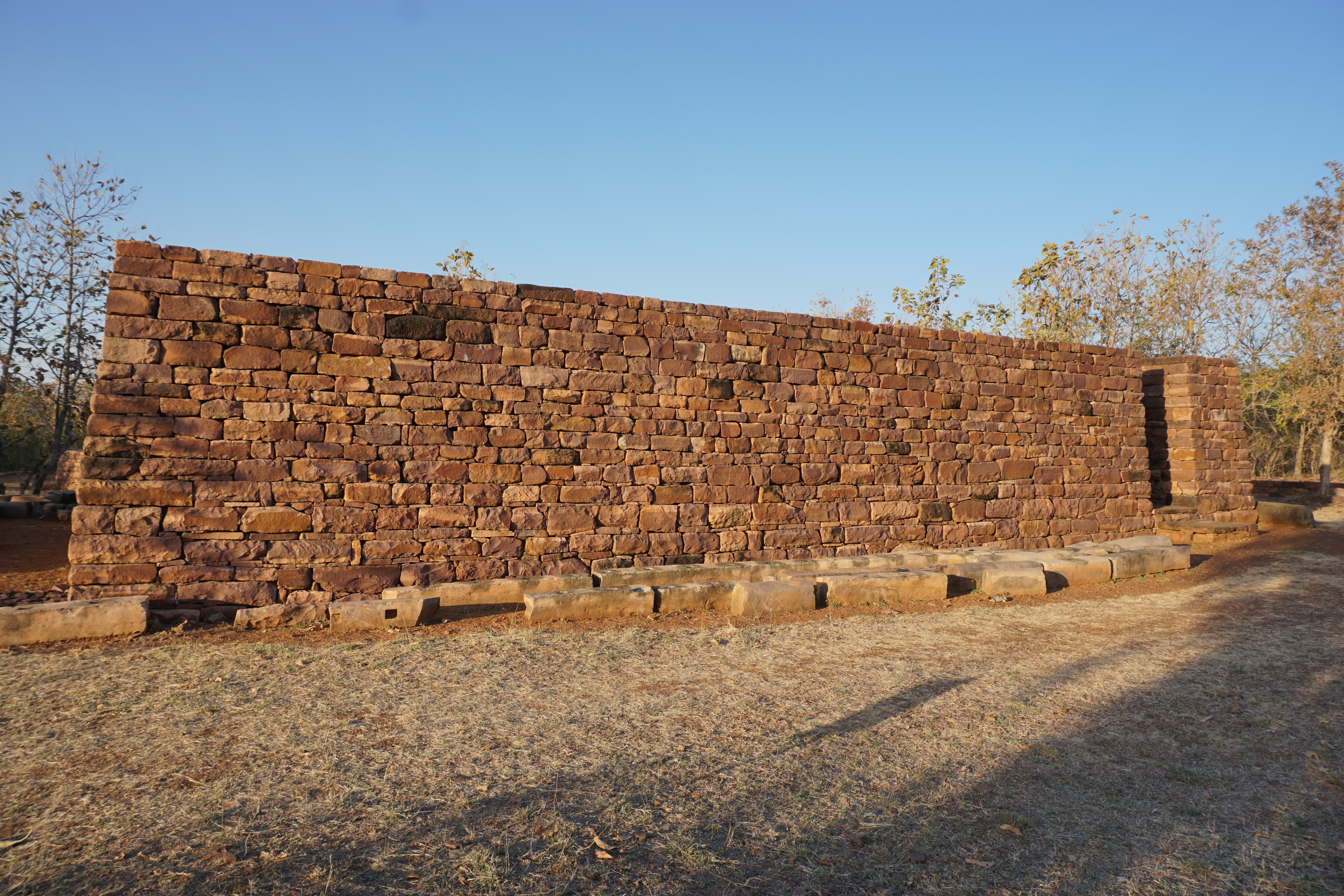
The Vihara.

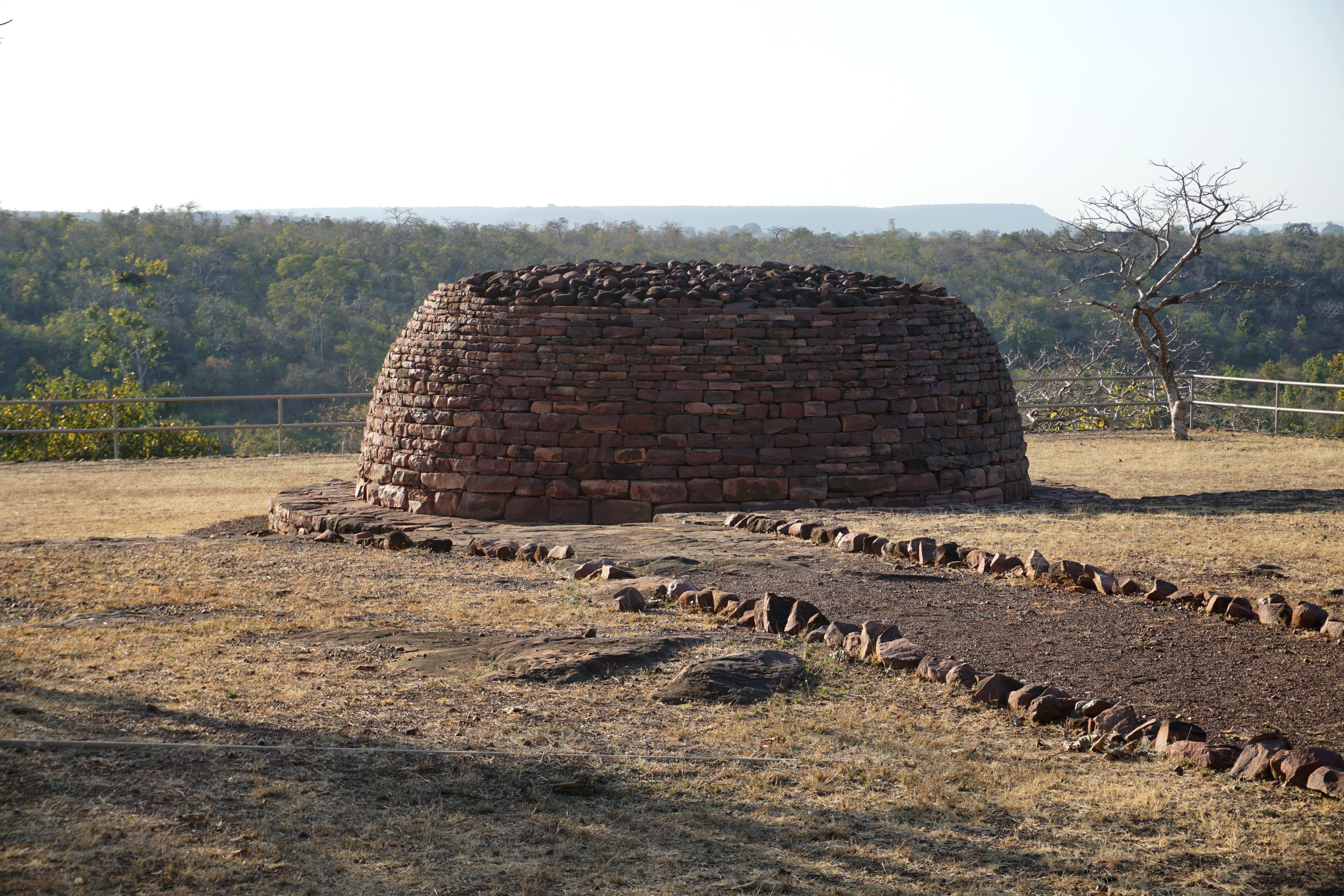
Another stupa.

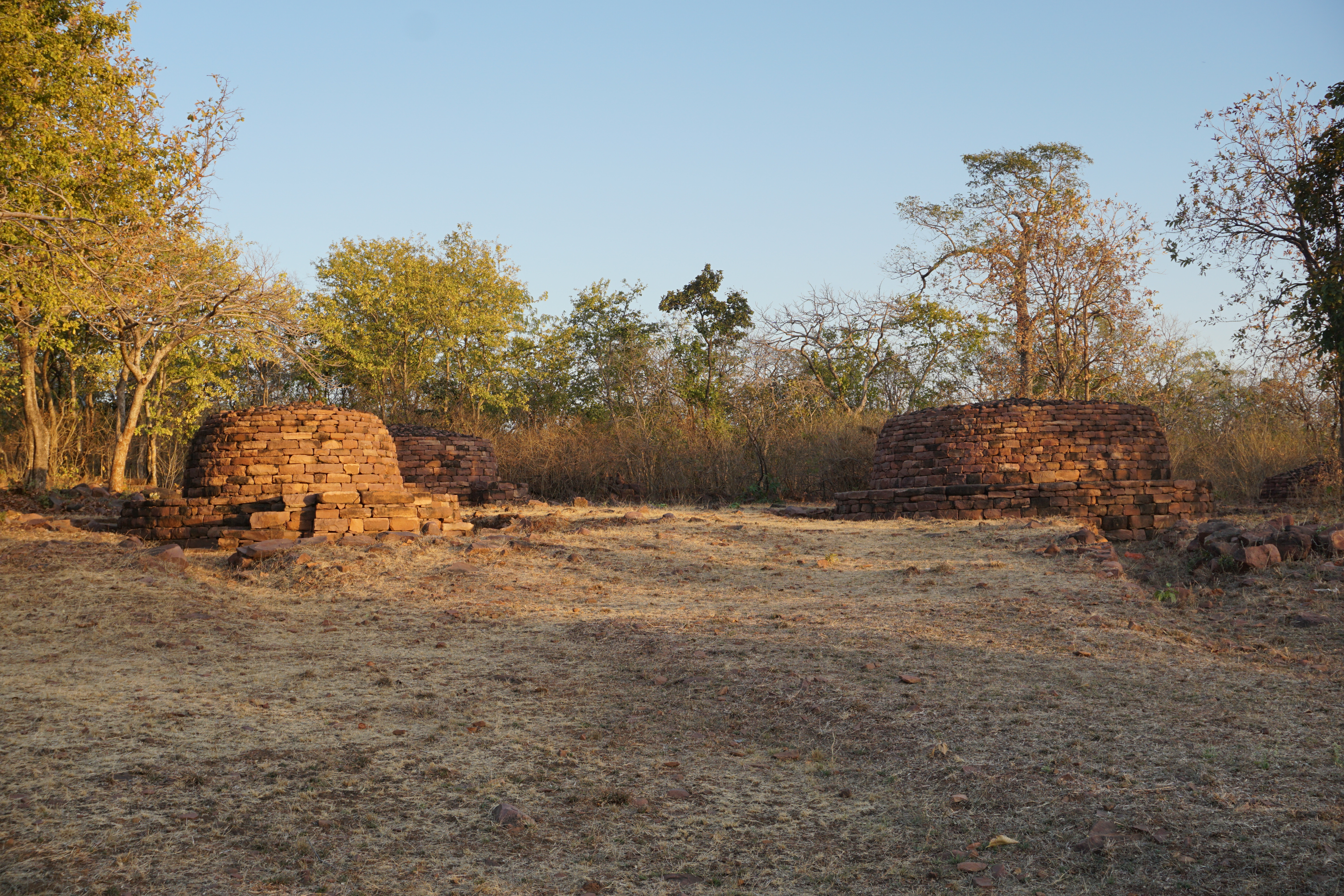
Set of little stupas.

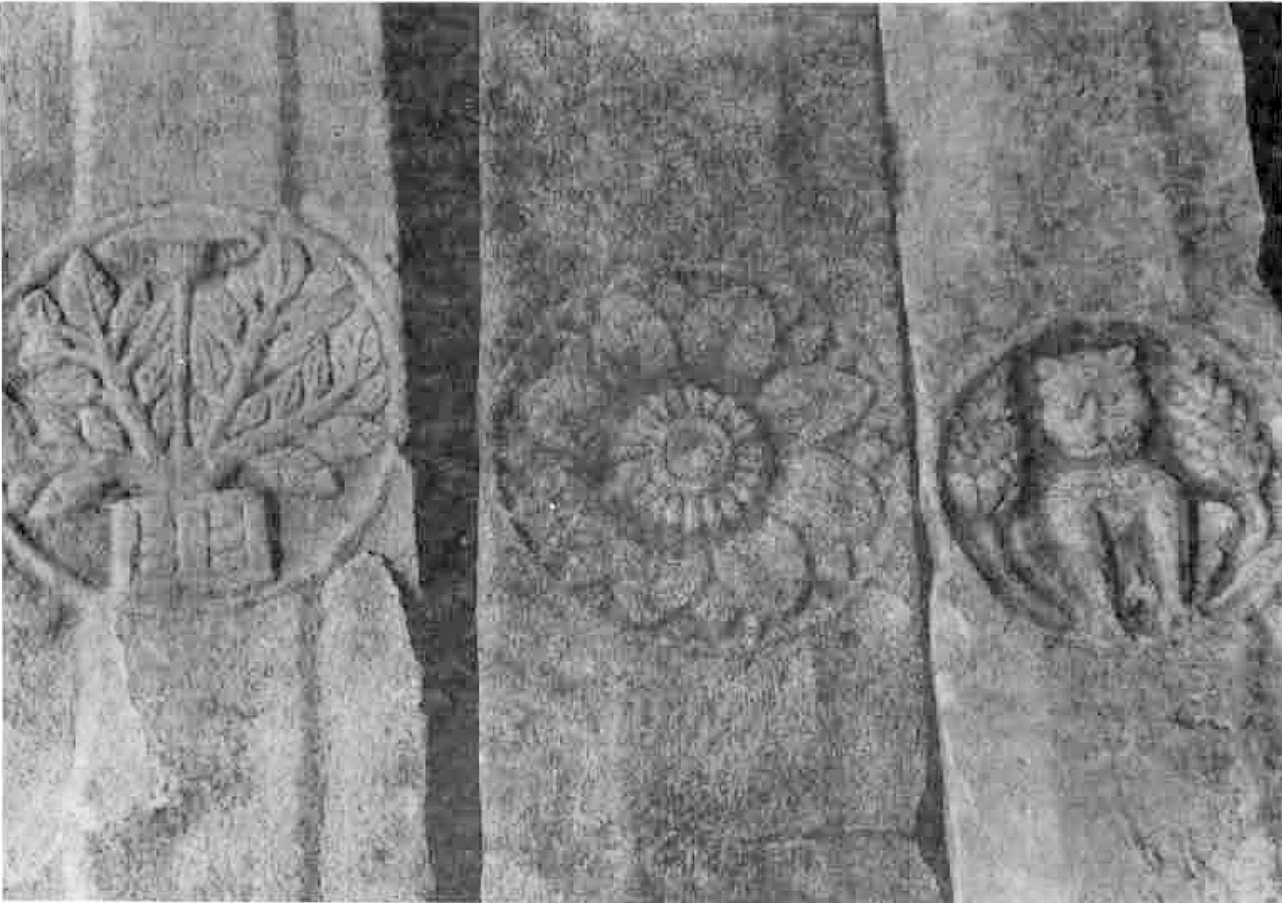
Satdhara vedika pillars
