= Bhojpur Stupas =

- Morel Khurd Stupas
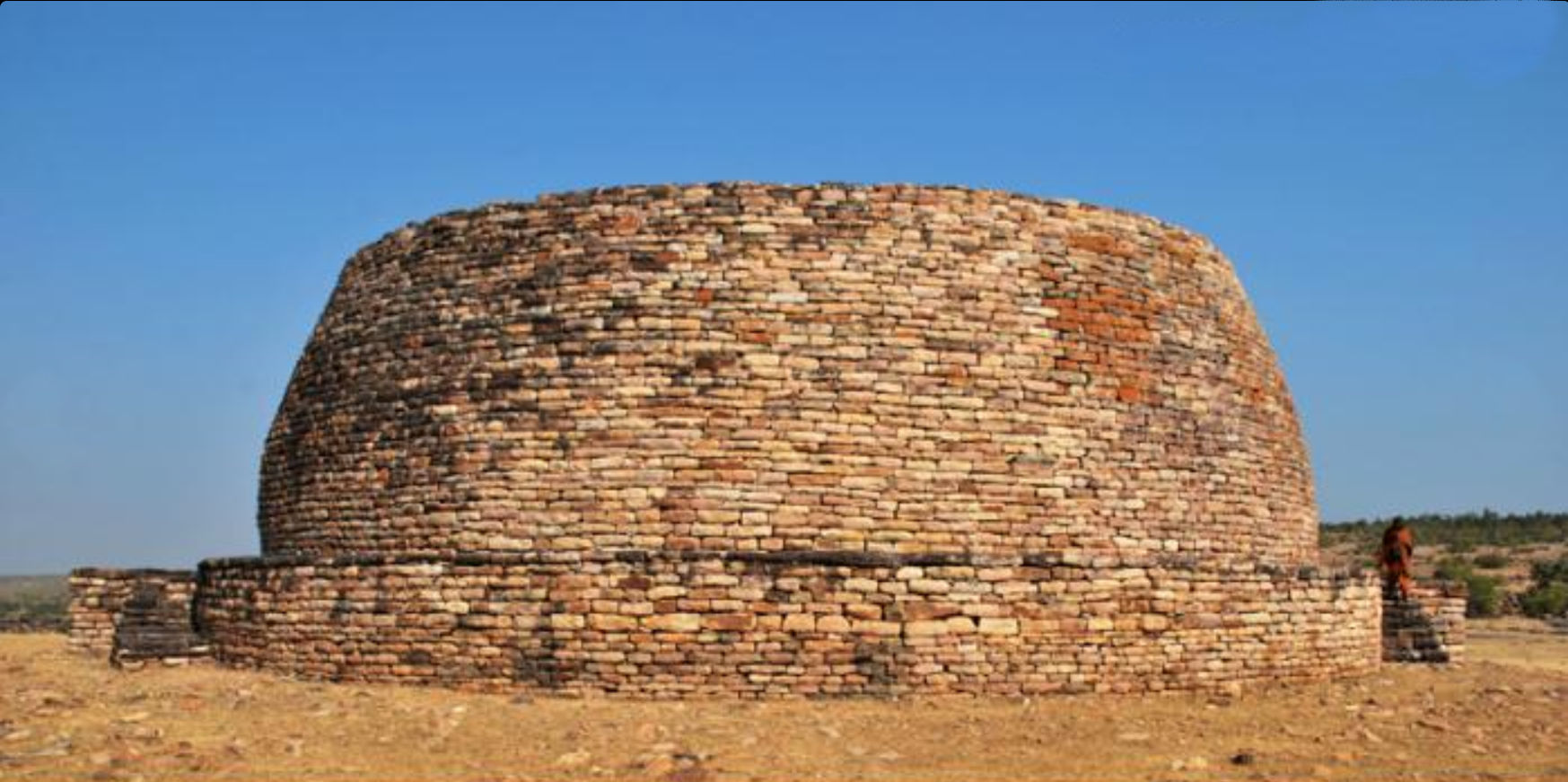
- The Great Stupa of Bhojpur

- Location within India Location within Madhya Pradesh
- 23°25′53″N 77°50′31″E
- Type: Buddhist settlement

The Bhojpur Stupas, also called Murelkhurd Stupas or Morel Khurd Stupas by the Archaeological Survey of India to avoid confusion with the village and archaeological site of Bhojpur, Madhya Pradesh about 45 km to the southwest, are a group of about thirty stupas located southeast of Sanchi, about at about 11 km.

There are in all four groups of stupas surrounding Sanchi within a radius of twenty kilometers: Bhojpur and Andher Stupas in the south-east, Sonari in the southwest, and Satdhara to the west. Further south, about 100 km, is Saru Maru.

All these stupas were searched in the 19th century by Major Cunningham, who in most cases carried the reliquaries to England. One of the reliquaries is made of rock crystal and comes in the form of a Buddhist stupa. Rock crystal, a material of extreme purity, was often used to make containers for sacred relics. This reliquary was found the room of relics of Stupa 2 during the excavations in 1851 by Alexander Cunningham and FC Maisey.

The center of the stupas was hollow to accommodate small relics (present when they were excavated, but now lost), and the stupa would have been wearing an umbrella, symbol of high rank. These stupas probably date from the 1st century BCE.

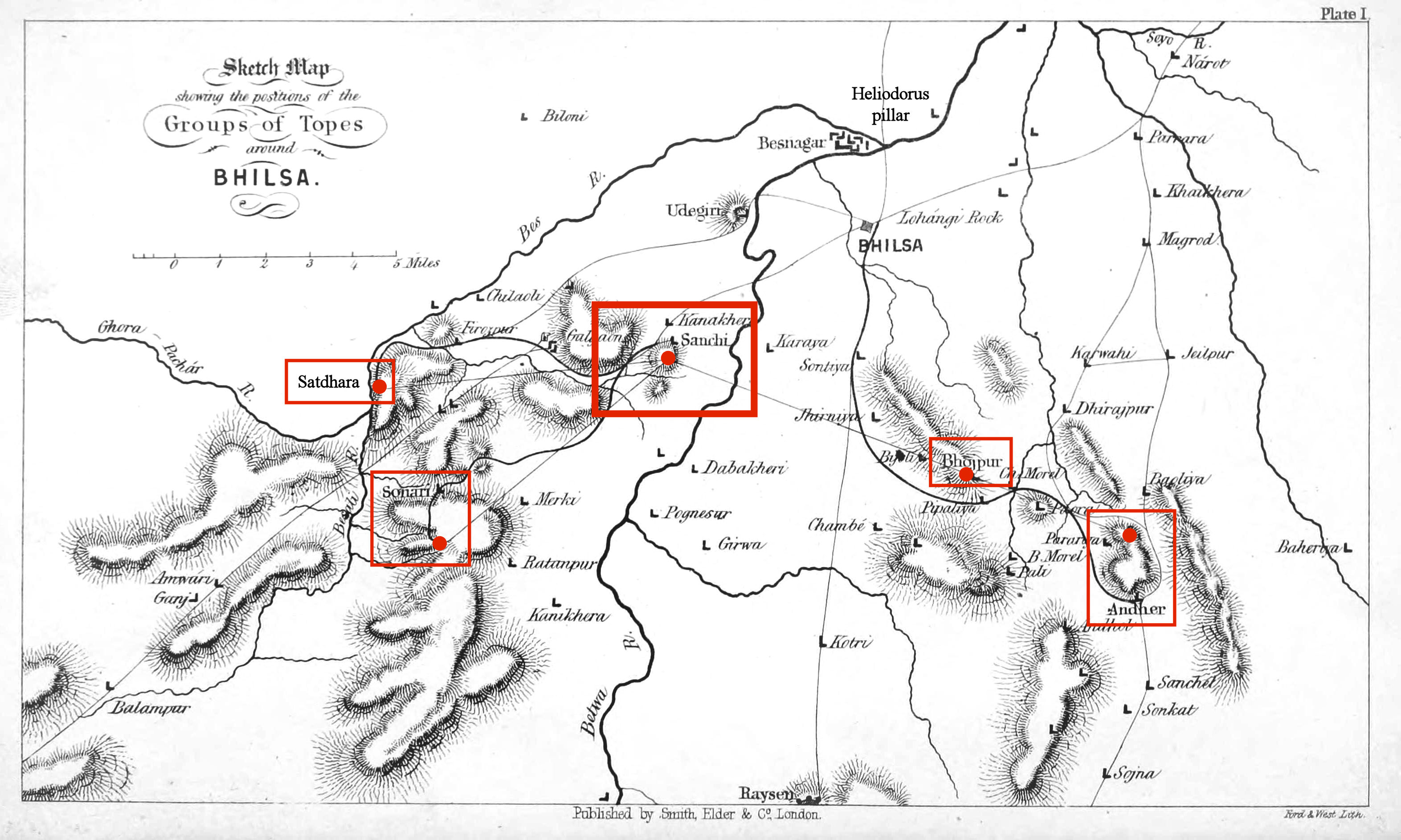
Sanchi and surrounding stupas.

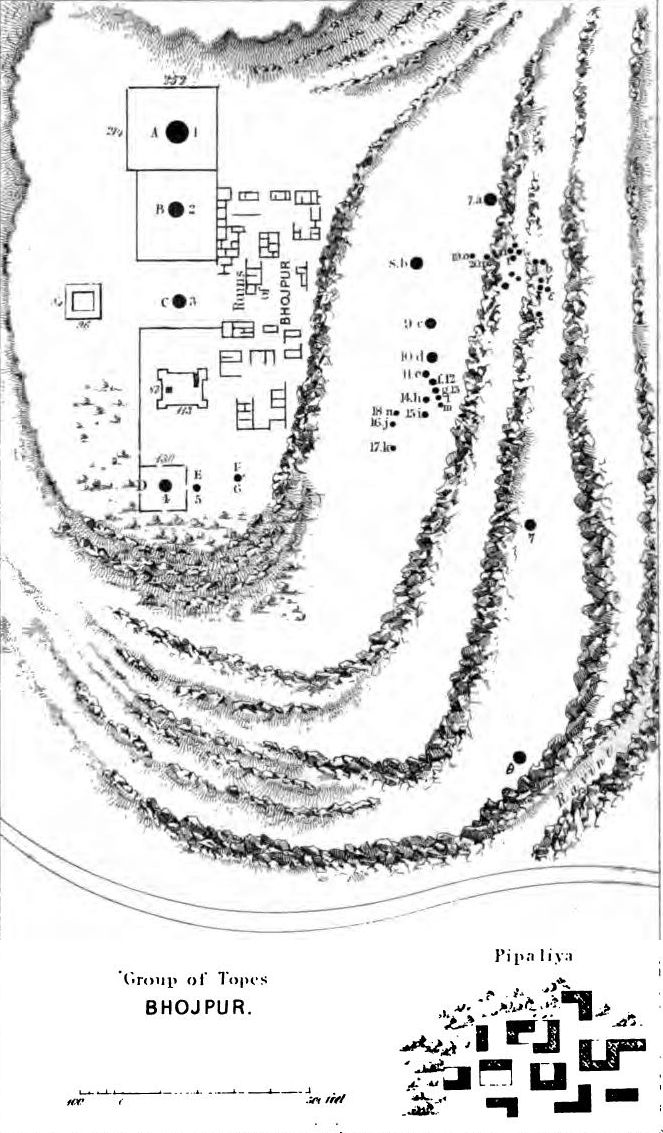
General plan.

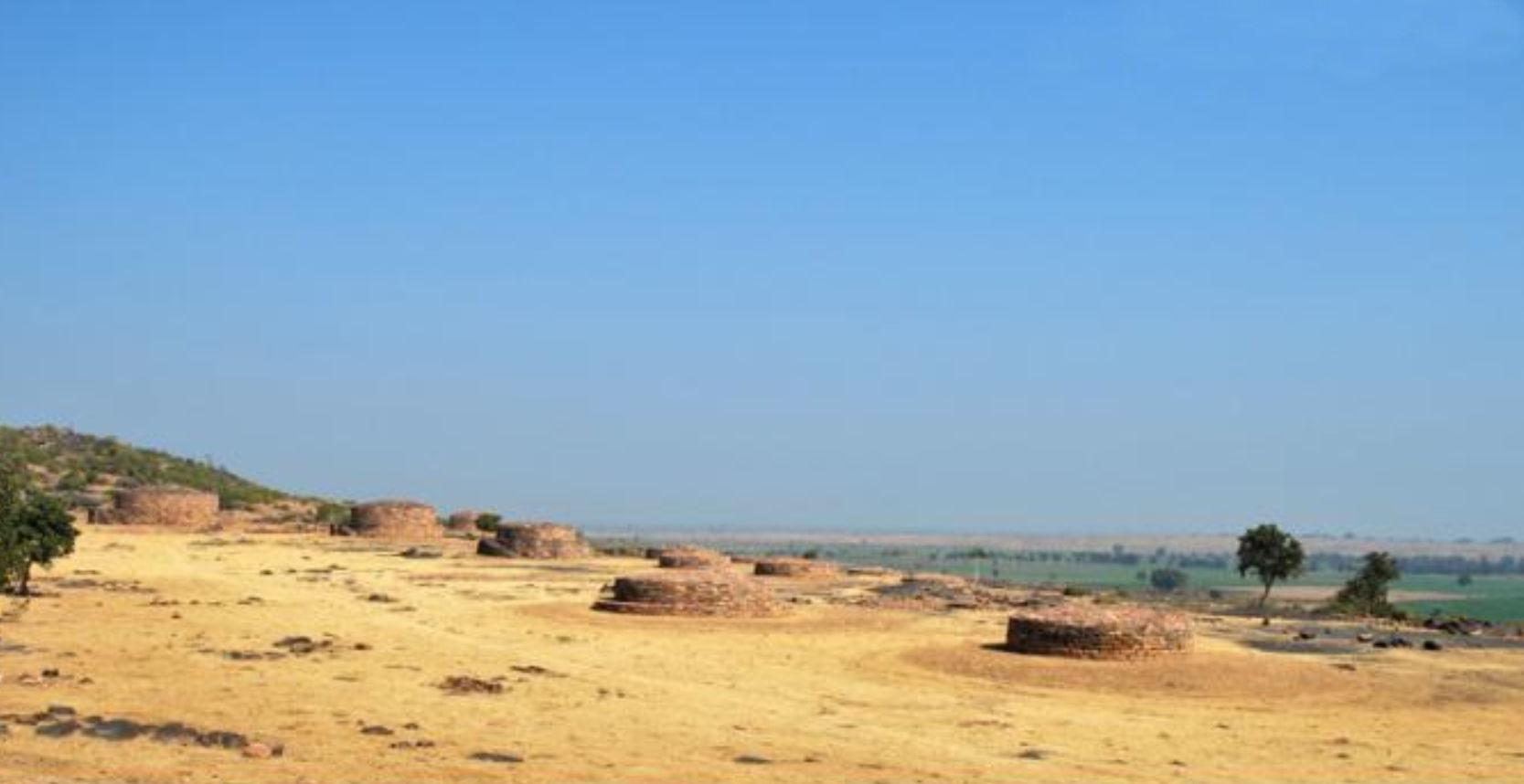
Group of stupas.

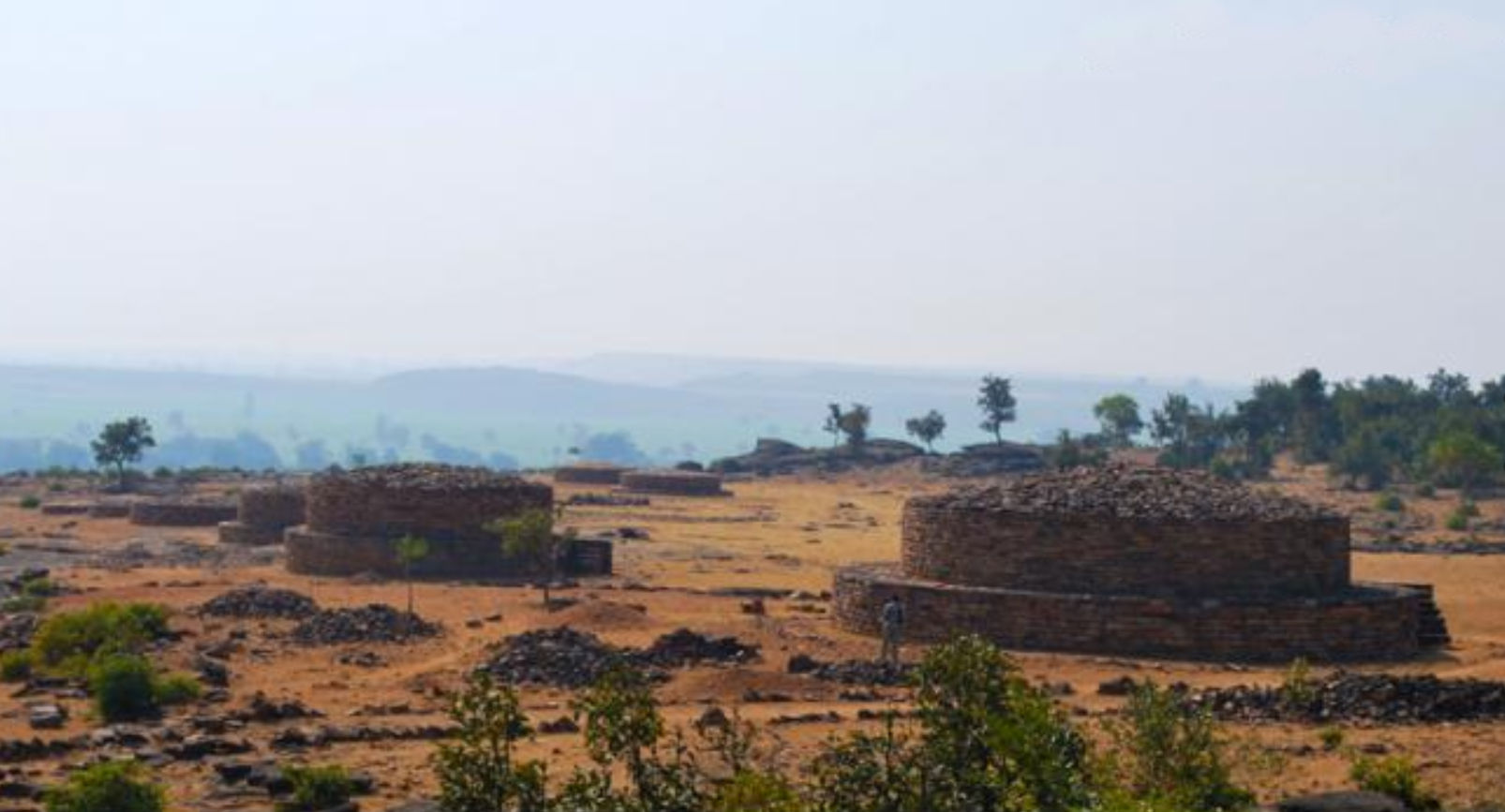
Group of stupas. The Sanchi stupas appear far away on the horizon.

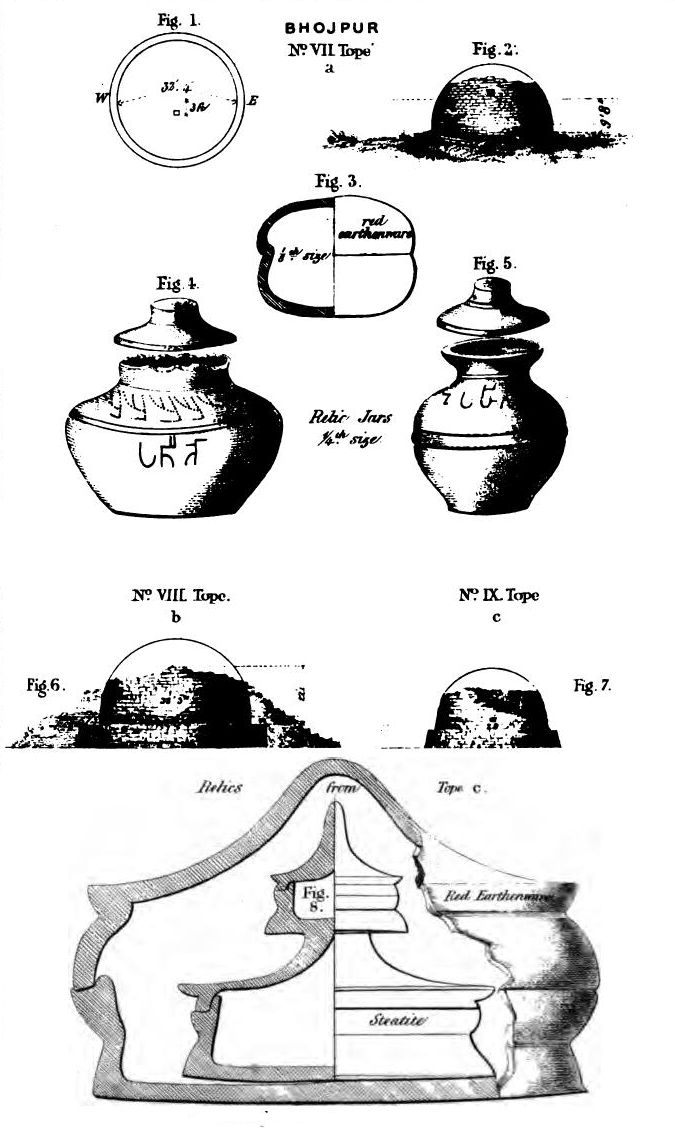
Stupas, reliquaries and inscriptions.

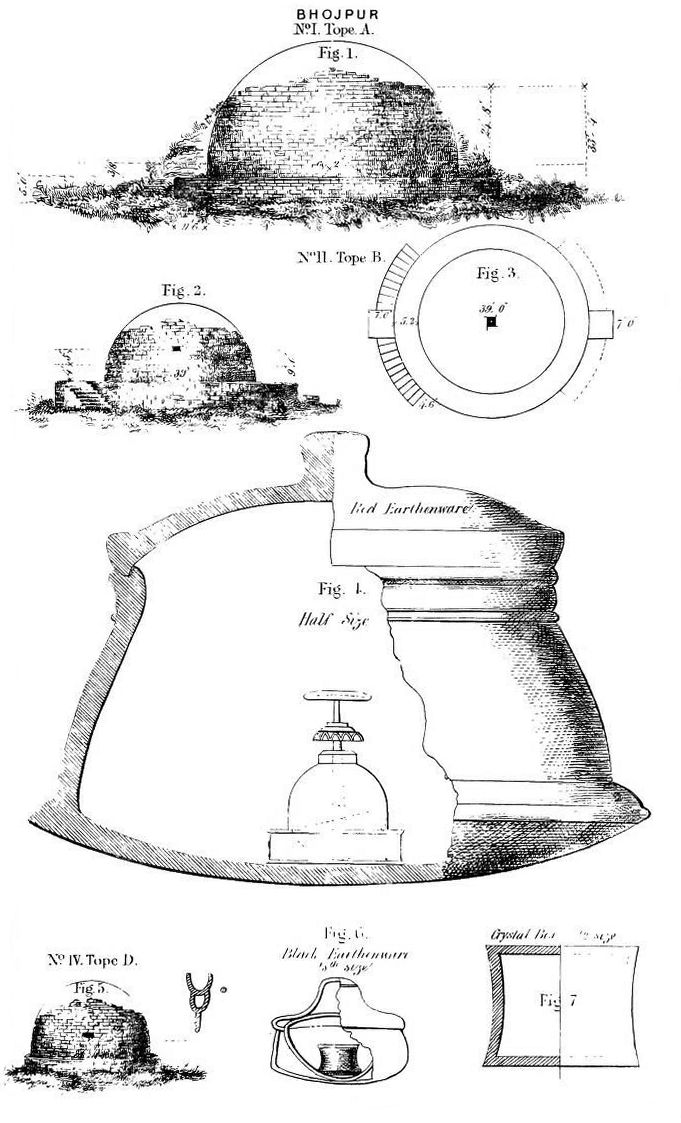
Stupas, reliquaries and inscriptions.

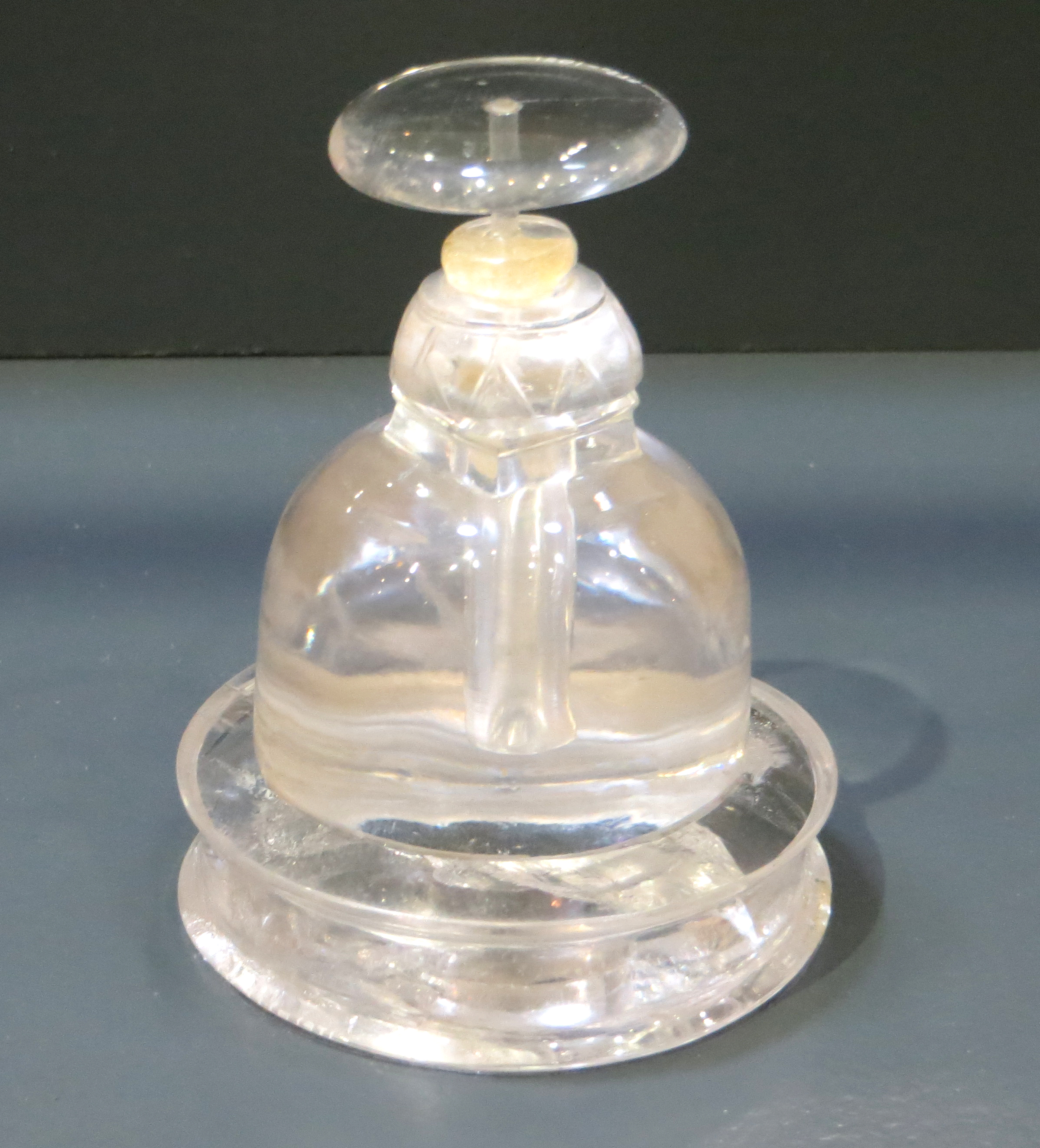
The reliquary of stupa n°2, in rock crystal (H: 11 cm, W: 8 cm, Victoria and Albert Museum).

== See also ==
- Reliquary of Stupa No. 4 (British Museum)
- Reliquary of Stupa No. 4 (British Museum)
- Reliquary of Stupa # 9 (British Museum)
