= Andher Stupas =

- Andher Stupas
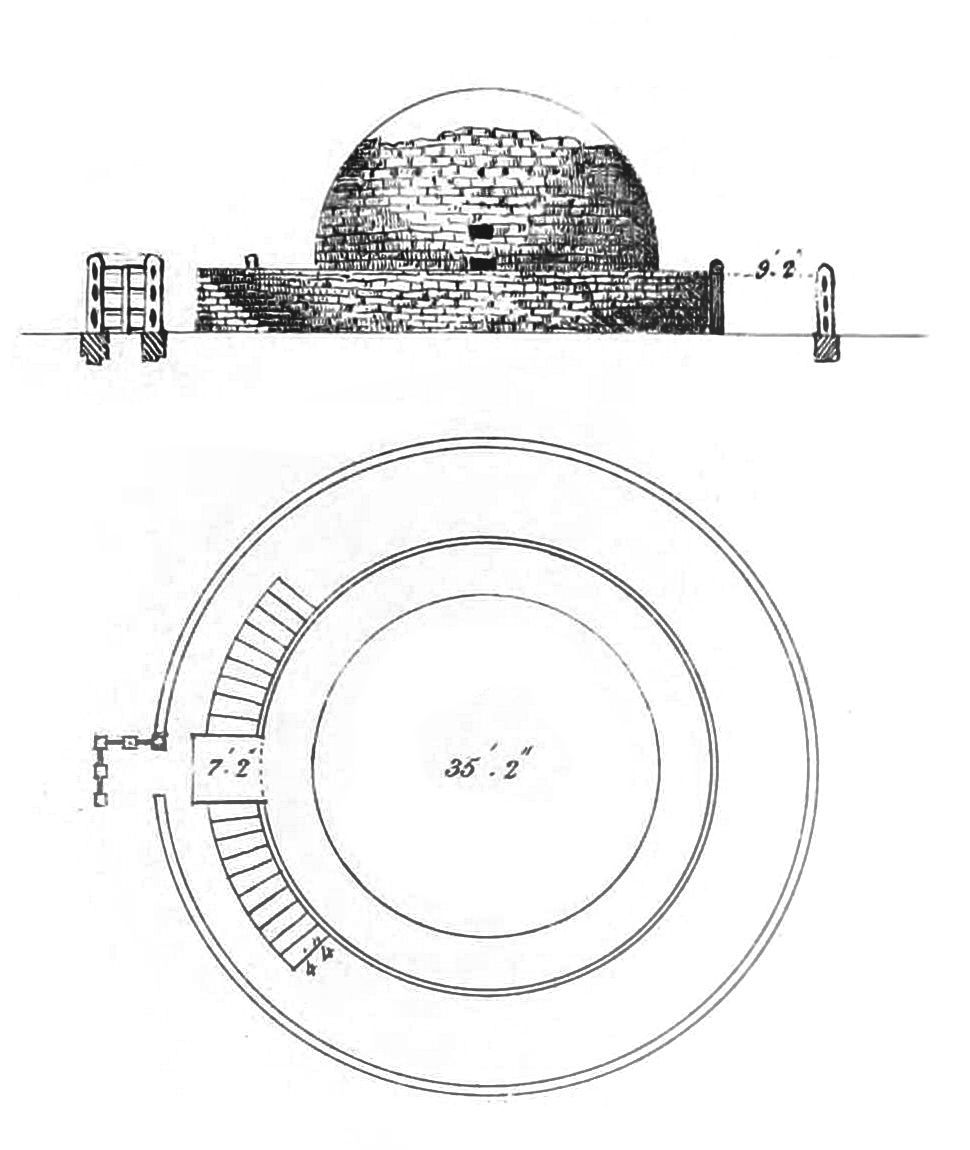
- Stupa No.1 at Andher.

- Location within India Location within Madhya Pradesh
- 23°24′40″N 77°54′26″E
- Type: Buddhist settlement

The Andher Stupas are a group of three stupa located 19 km south-east of Sanchi, Raisen District, Madhya Pradesh, India. Located high enough, they overlook the Bhojpur Stupas, beyond which are visible the stupas of Sanchi.

== The stupas ==
Stupa No.1 can be dated to about 150 BCE. It is the largest of the three stupas, and it has the remains of a barrier of stone surrounding it (Vedika or "railing").

Stupas No.2 and No.3 revealed inscriptions in Brahmi with the same names as the monks whose relics were found in Sanchi Stupa No.2 and Sonari (Vachi and Moggaliputa for stupa No.2 and Haritiputa for stupa No.3.

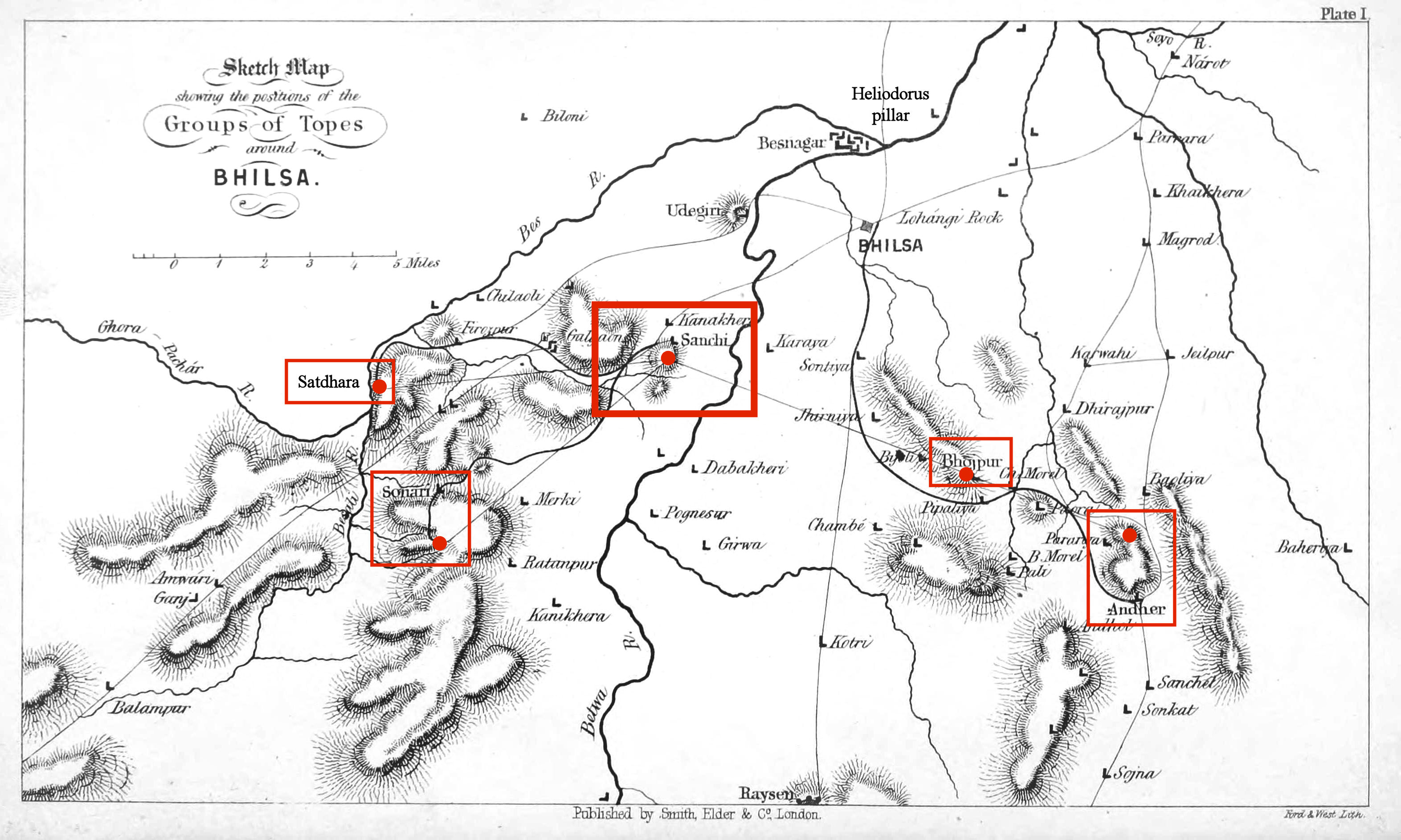
Sanchi and surrounding stupas.

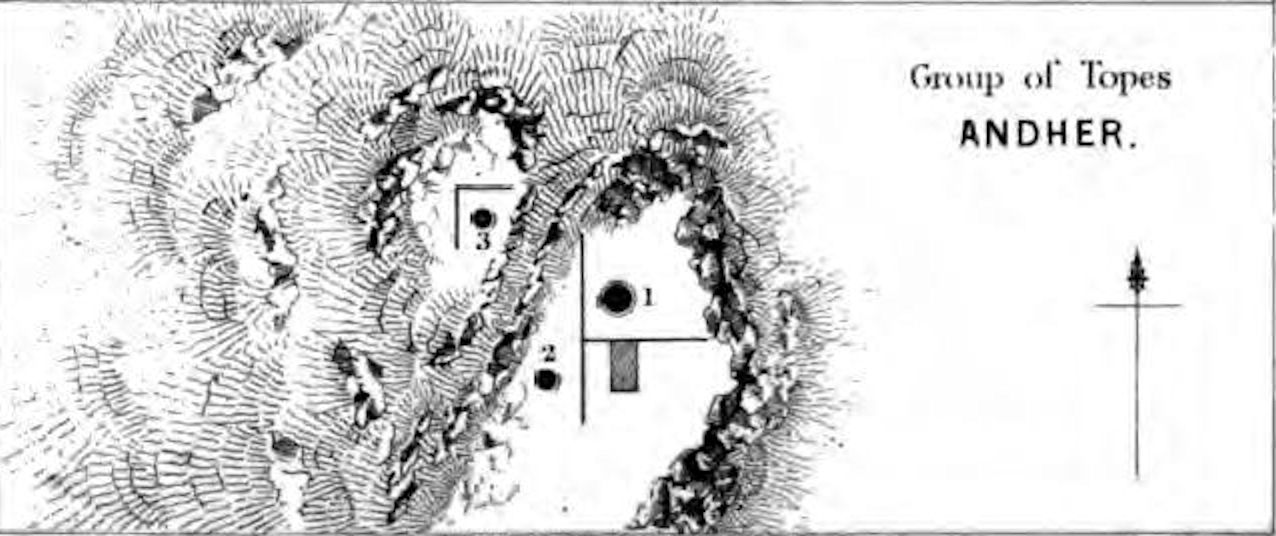
Map of Andher stupas.

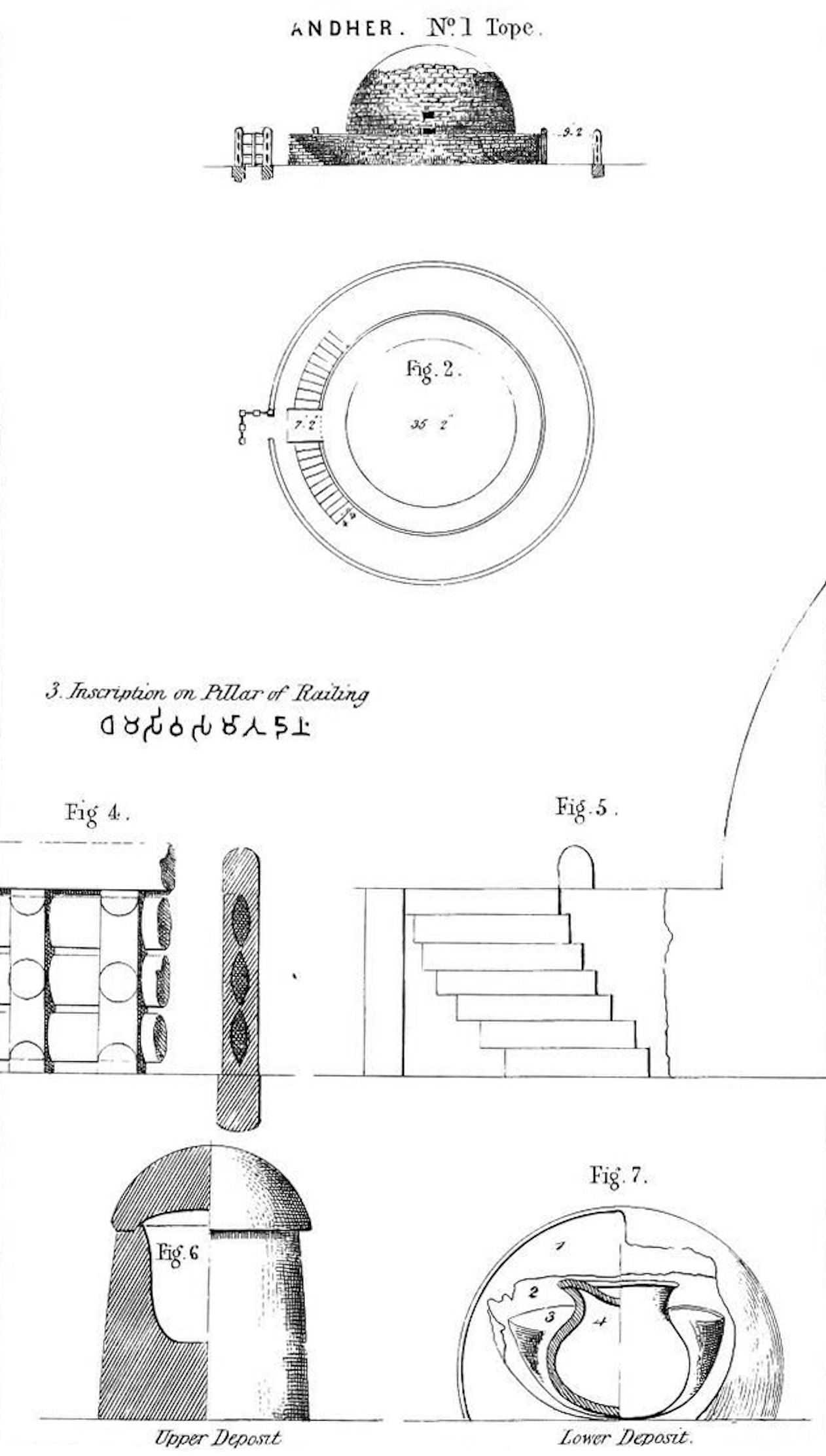
Stupa No.1 and reliquary.

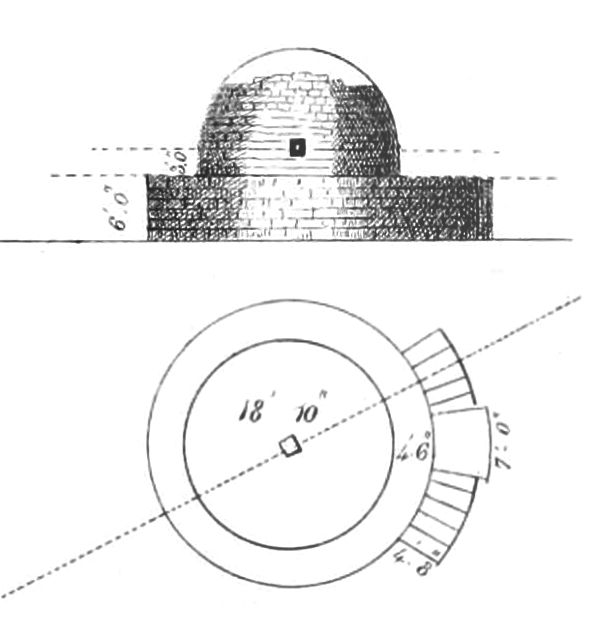
Stupa No.2.

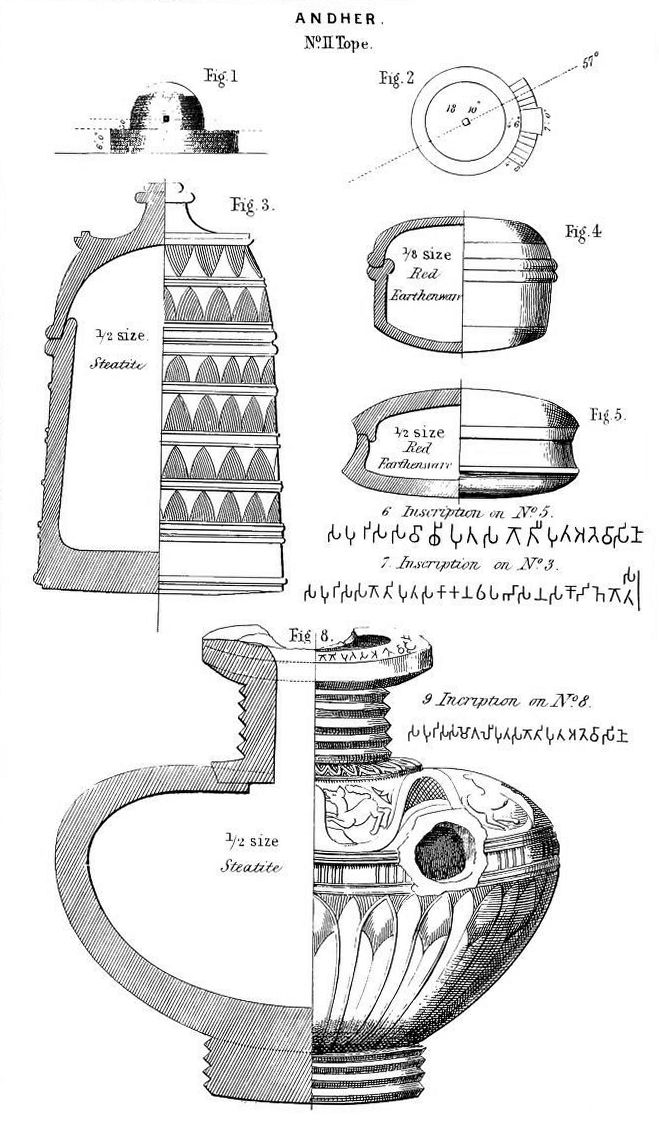
Stupa No.2, reliquary (British Museum) and inscriptions.

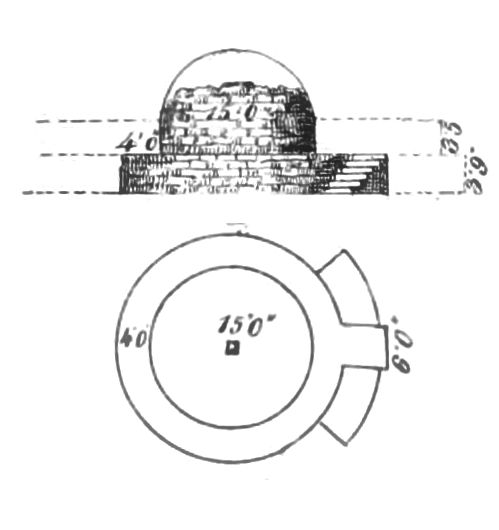
Stupa No.3.

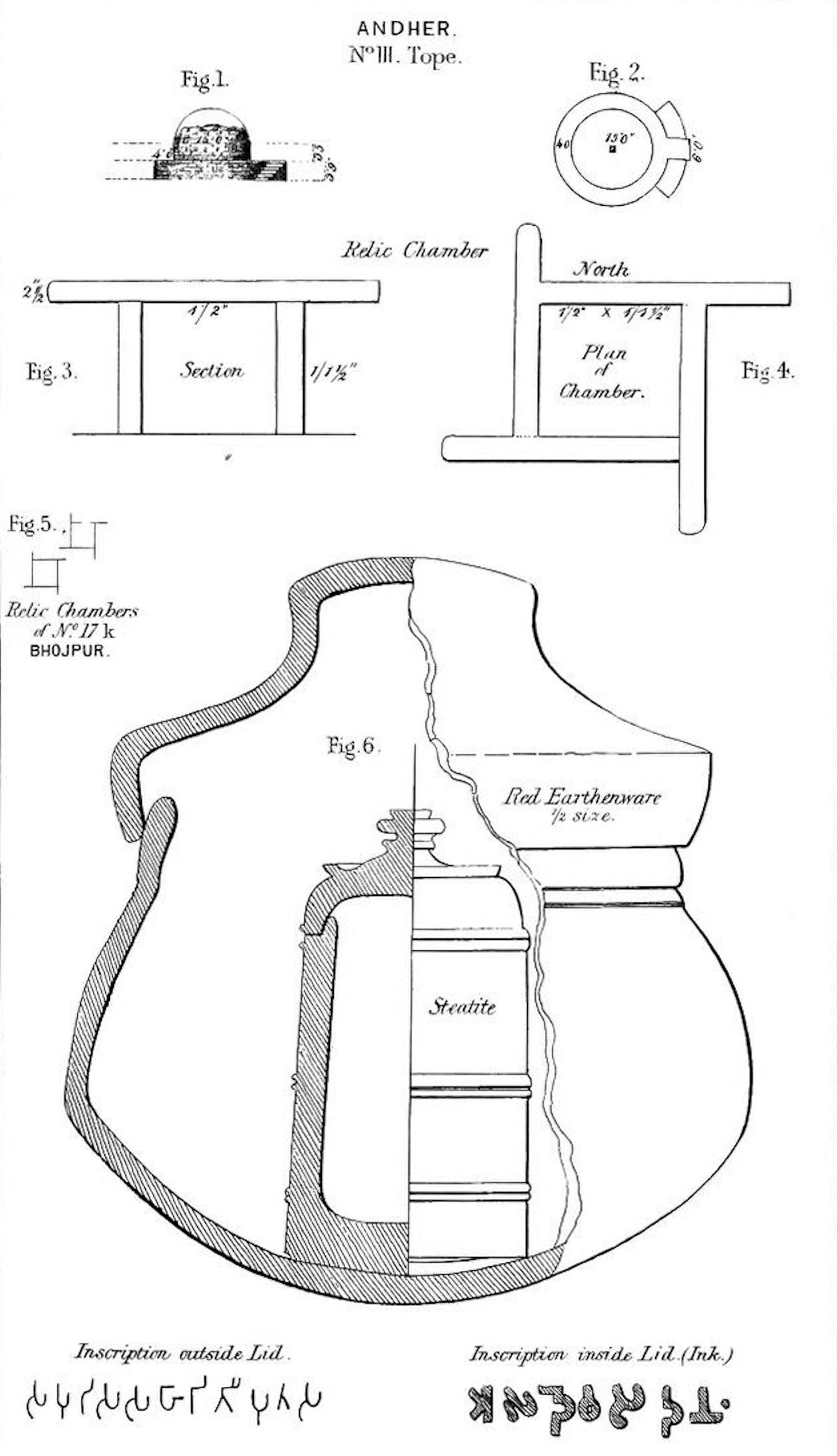
Stupa No.3. In a red pottery vessel, a reliquary (British Museum ).

== Other stupas nearby ==
There are altogether four groups of stupas surrounding Sanchi within a radius of about twenty kilometers: Bhojpur and Andher in the south-east, Sonari in the southwest, and Satdhara to the west. Further south, about 100 km away, is Saru Maru.
