= Sonari Stupas =

- Sonari
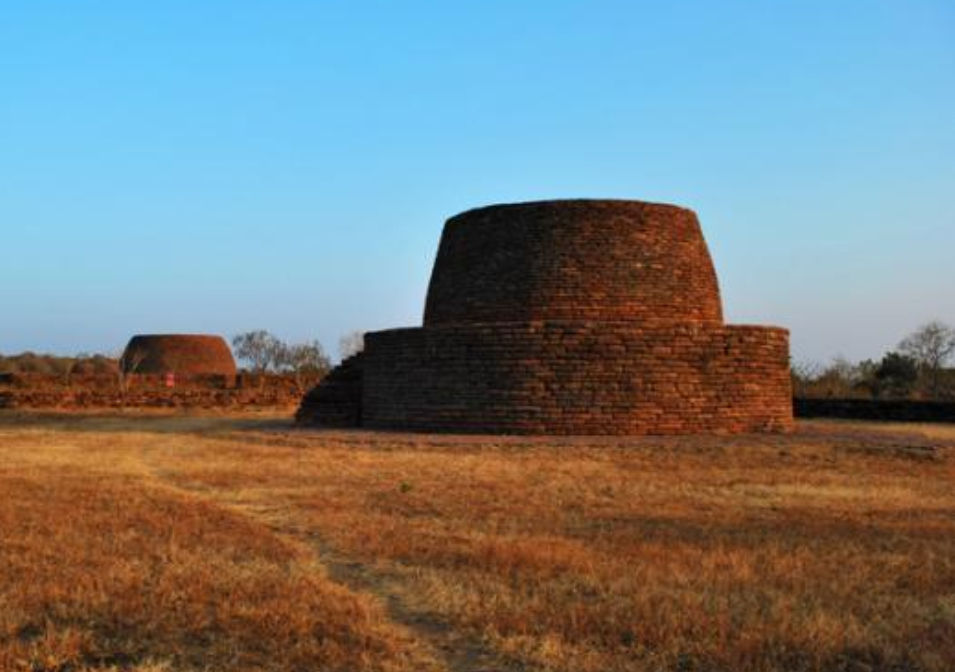
- Sonari stupa n°2 with stupa n°1 in the background.

- Location within India Location within Madhya Pradesh
- 23°25′56″N 77°39′51″E
- Type: Buddhist settlement

Sonari is the archaeological site of an ancient monastic complex of Buddhist stupas. The site, positioned on a hill, is located about 10 km southwest of Sanchi, Madhya Pradesh, India. near Salamatpur Railway Station.

== History ==
The stupas were excavated around 1850 by Alexander Cunningham, who discovered two boxes containing relics. One of the reliquaries, which is very ornate, is visible nowadays at the Victoria and Albert Museum.

The reliquary of Stupa No.2 presents has inscriptions in Brahmi mentioning the names of Buddhist monks also appearing in the reliquary of Sanchi Stupa No.2 and Andher Stupas: Kasapagota, Majjhima, Kosikiputa, Gotiputa, and Apagira. It would seem, then, that the ashes of these monks were divided between these three stupas.

The date of construction of Stupa 1 and Stupa 2 must therefore be equivalent to those of Sanchi Stupa No.2, i.e. 125-100 BCE.

There are in all four groups of stupas surrounding Sanchi within a radius of twenty kilometers: Bhojpur and Andher to the southeast, Sonari to the southwest, and Satdhara in the west. Further south, about 100 km away, is Saru Maru.

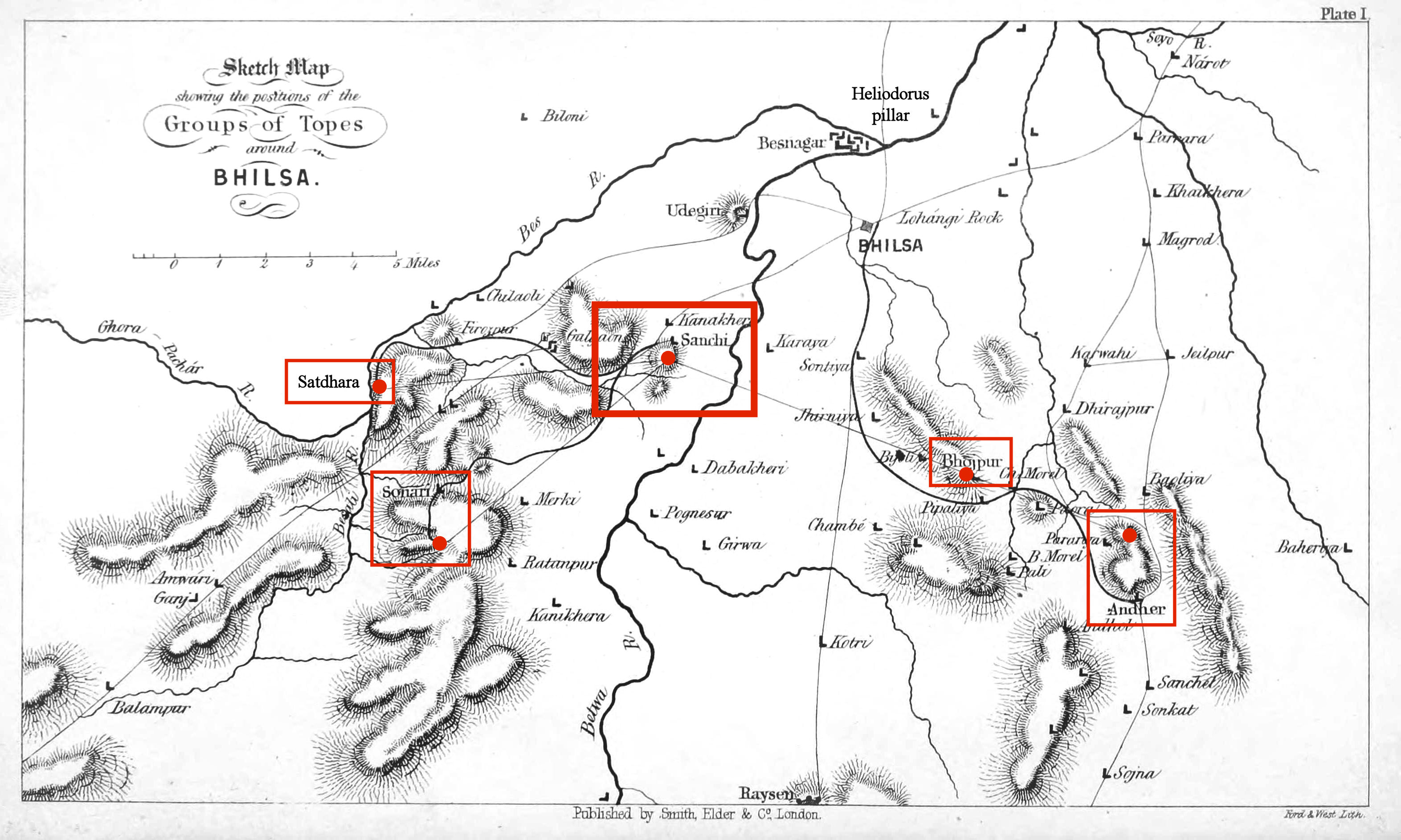
Sanchi and surrounding stupas, including Sonari southwest of Sanchi.

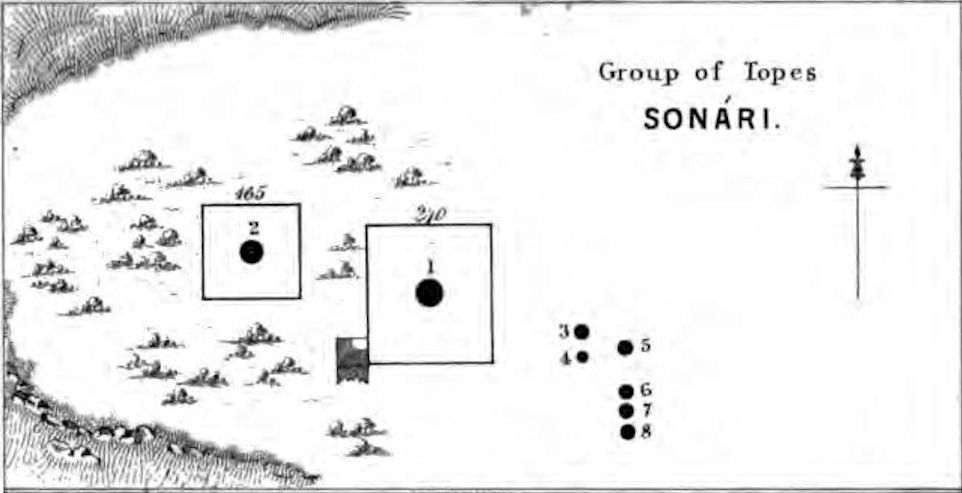
Plan of Sonari stupas.

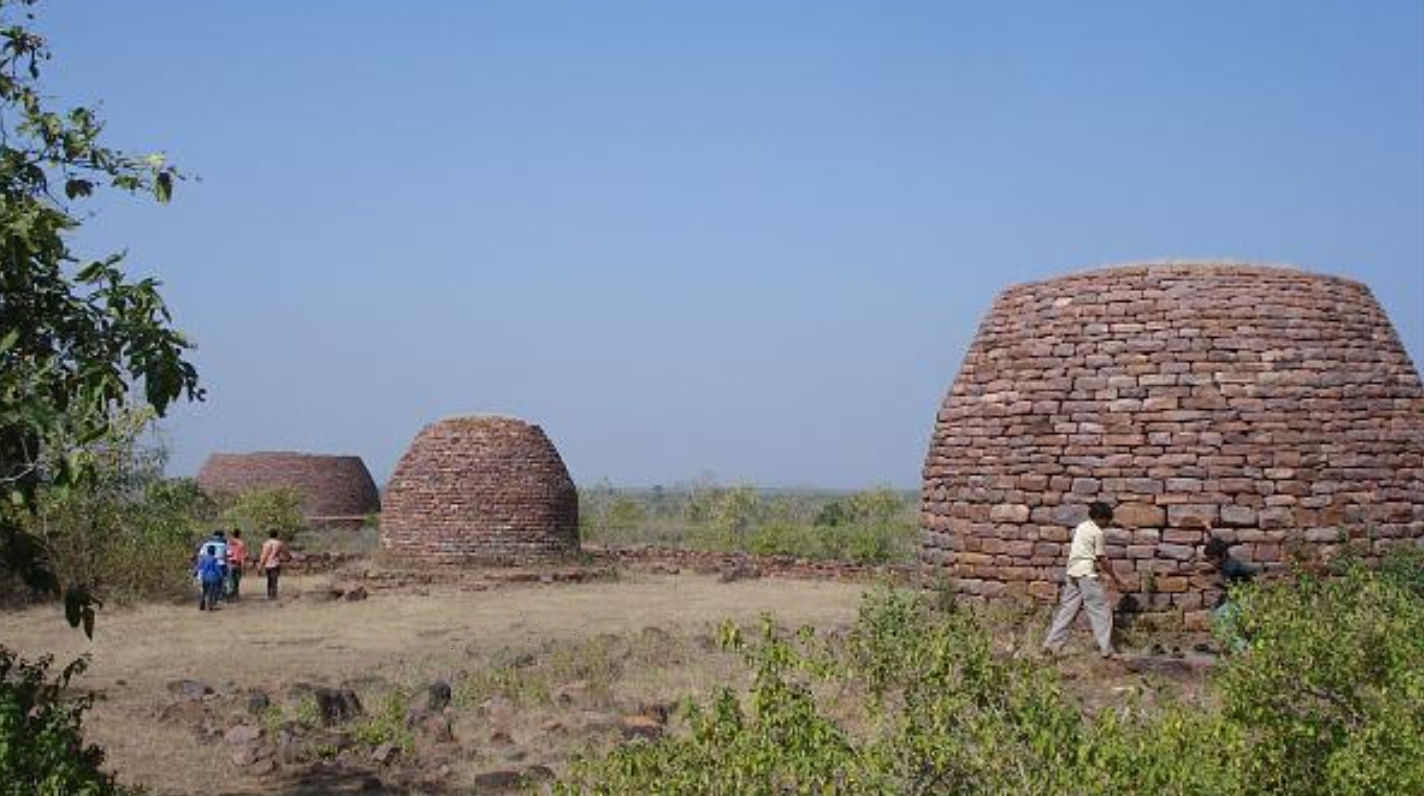
Small stupas in Sonari, and stupa No.1 in the background.

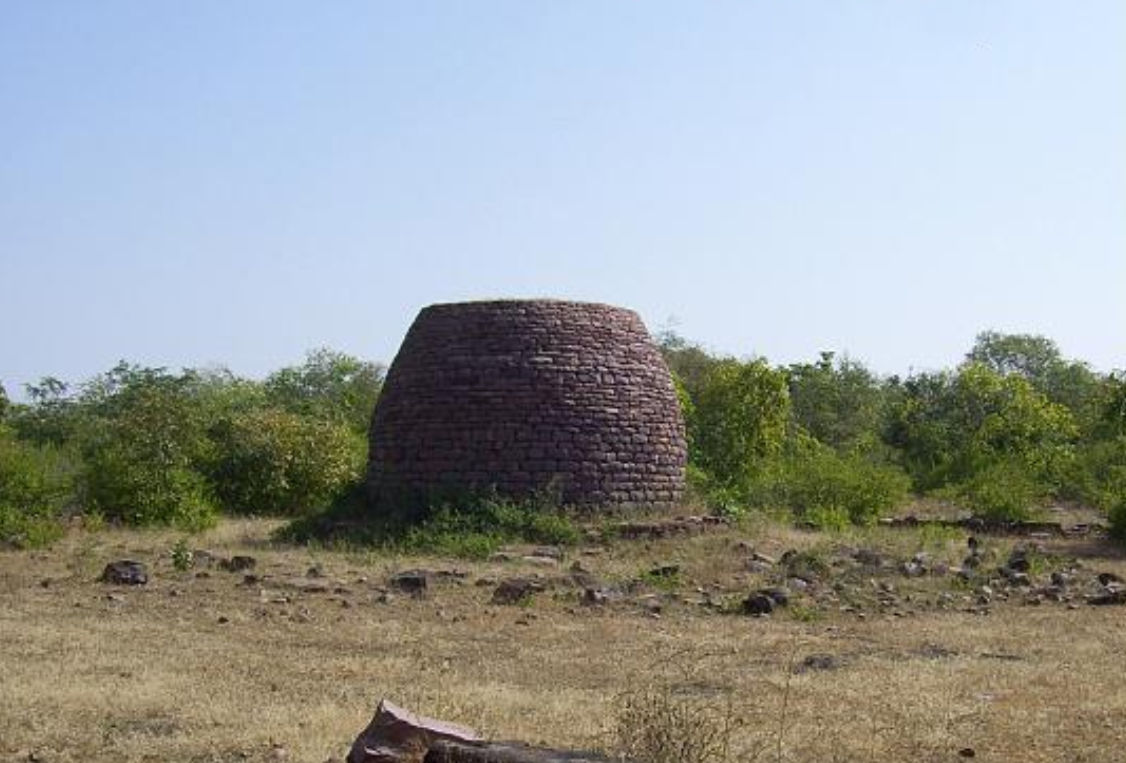
One of the little stupas.

== Stupa No.1 ==
Alexander Cunningham and FC Maisey searched Sonari's Stupa 1 in 1851. The stupa contained a miniature soapstone reliquary.

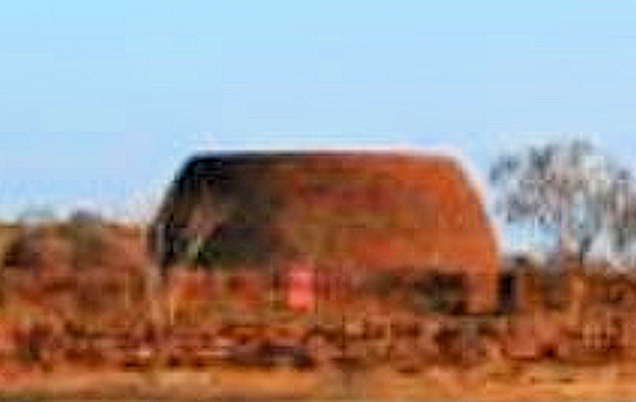
Stupa No.1

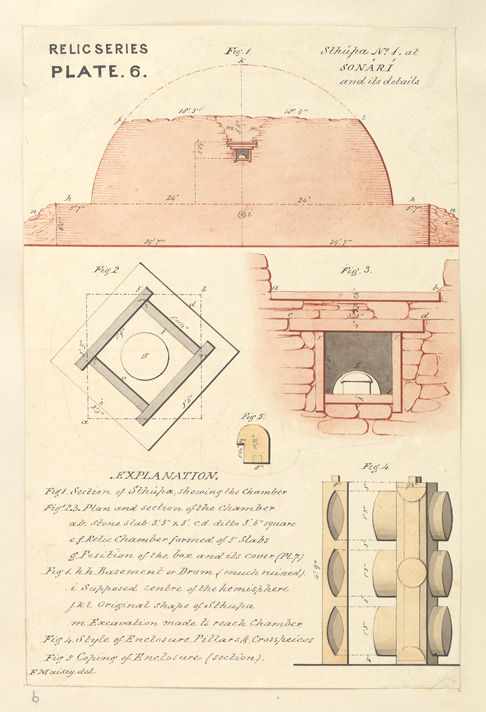
Plan of excavations of stupa No.1

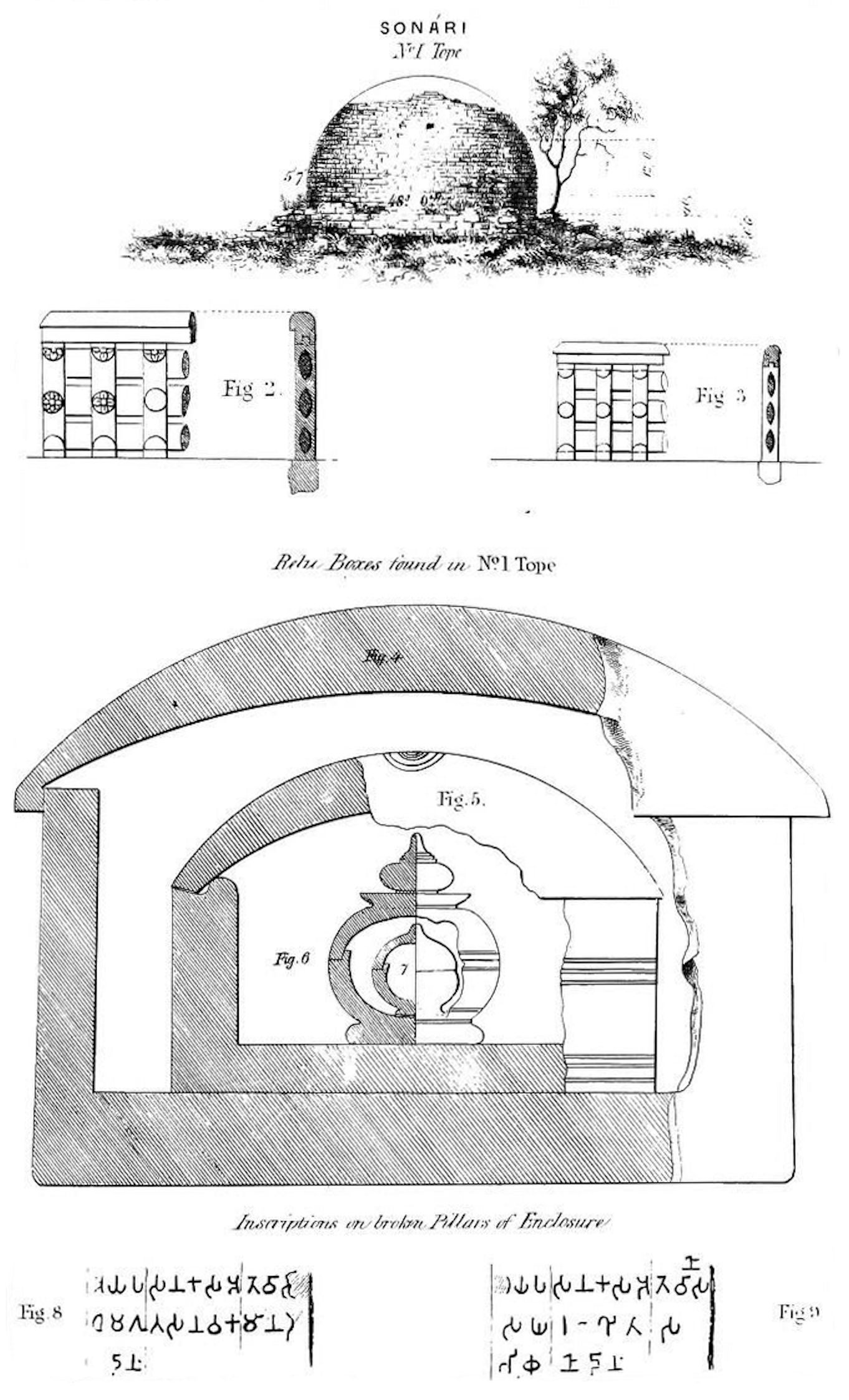
Reliquary of Stupa No.1

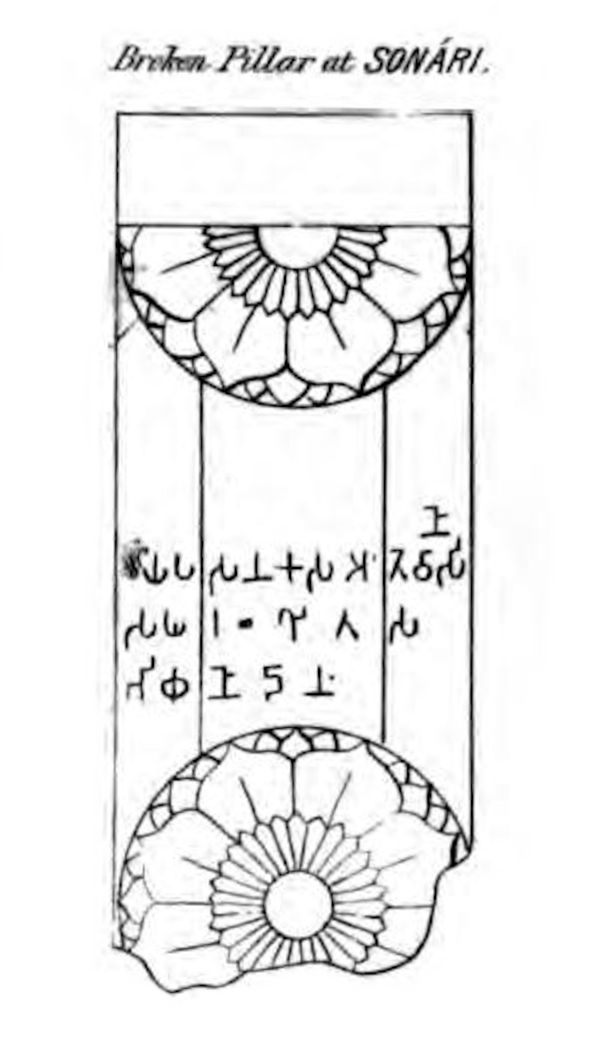
Decorated pillar of Sonari stupa No.1

== Stupa No.2 ==
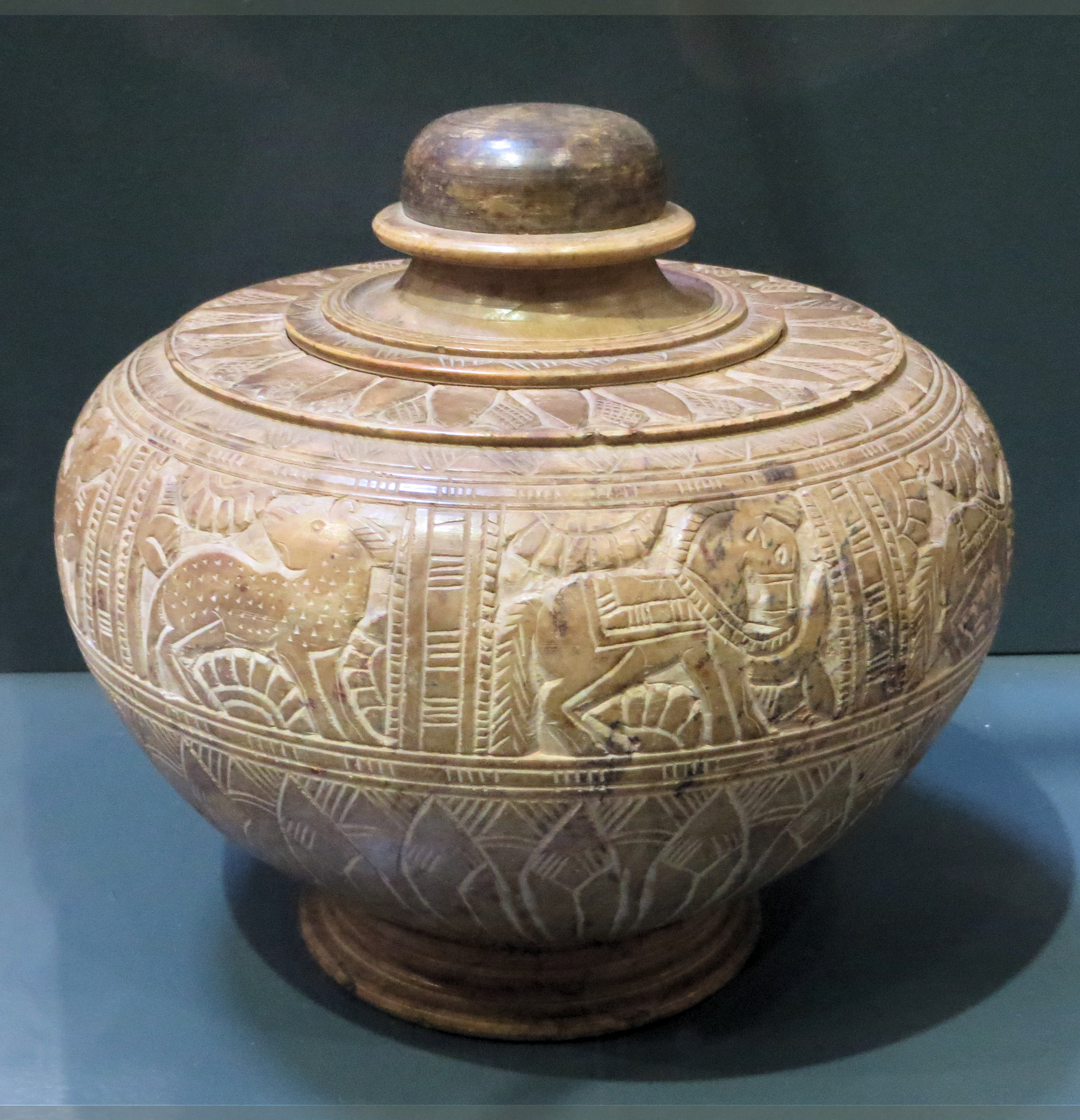
The main reliquary of Stupa No.2 at Victoria and Albert Museum .

Alexander Cunningham and FC Maisey searched Sonari's Stupa No.2 in 1851. The stupa contained three miniature reliquaries, two in soapstone and one in rock crystal, as well as a certain amount of bone ash and a piece of wood. The main reliquary is shaped to resemble a lotus bud, with incised petals decorating the lower half of the reliquary. It was turned on a lathe and then carved in bas-relief with lotus petal strips on the shoulder and lower body, while on the upper body is a large area divided into eight rectangular compartments in each of which are an elephant, horse, deer or winged lion, patterns typical of the period of the Maurya Empire. These discoveries were published by A Cunningham in The Bhilsa Topes in 1854.

It had been customary since the death of the Buddha to preserve and venerate his relics. Under emperor Ashoka (around 268-233 BCE), converted to Buddhism and energetic protector of the faith, a series of stupas, mounds of relics, were erected throughout the empire, marking sites important in the life of the Buddha. This practice continued, and this container of relics was buried around 200 BCE. Relic deposits of this period usually represented original deposits of the relics of the Buddha.

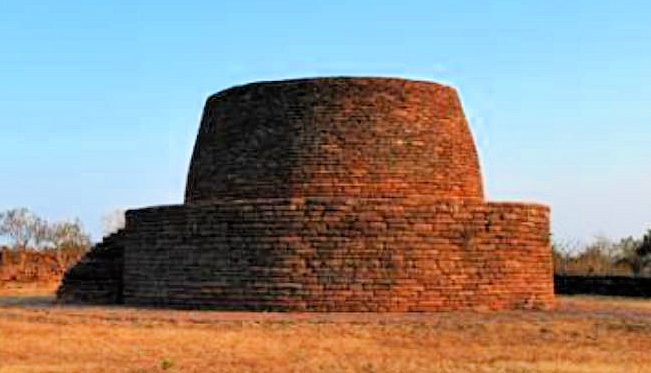
Stupa No.2

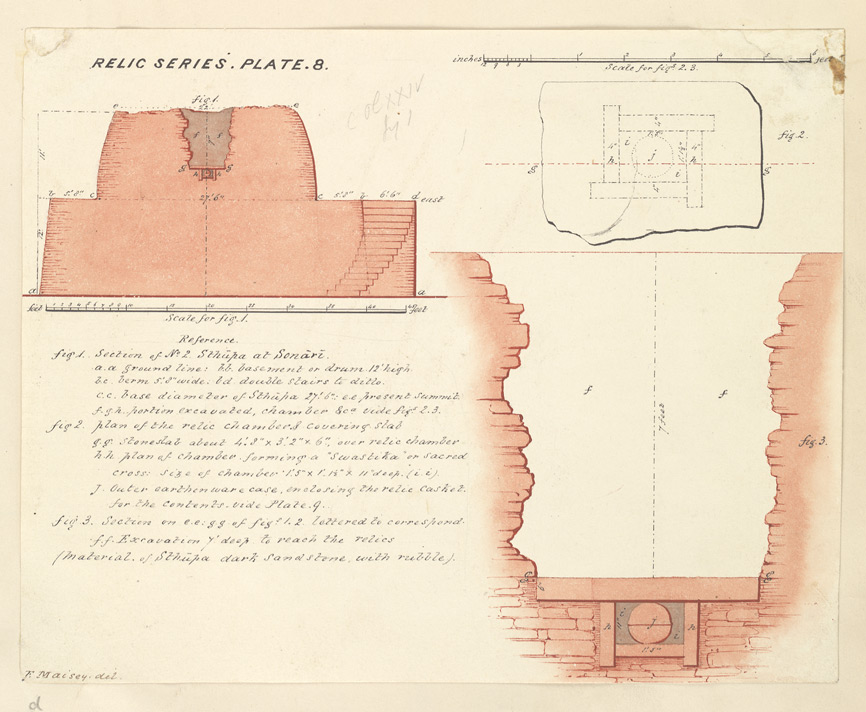
Section and plan.

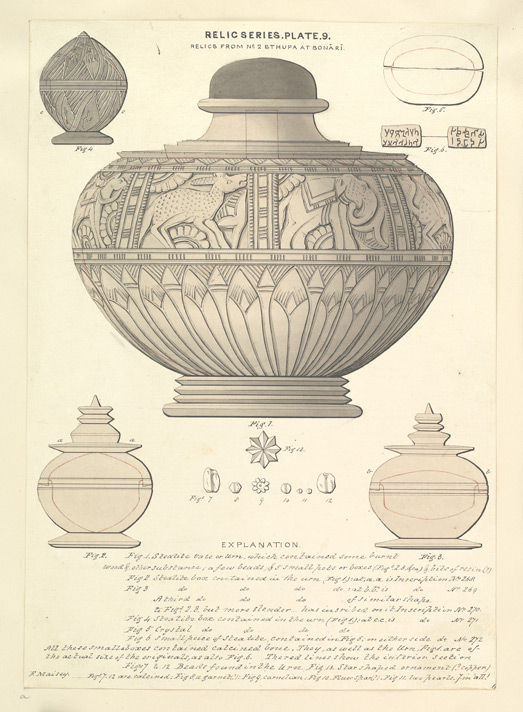
Relics of Stupa No.2.

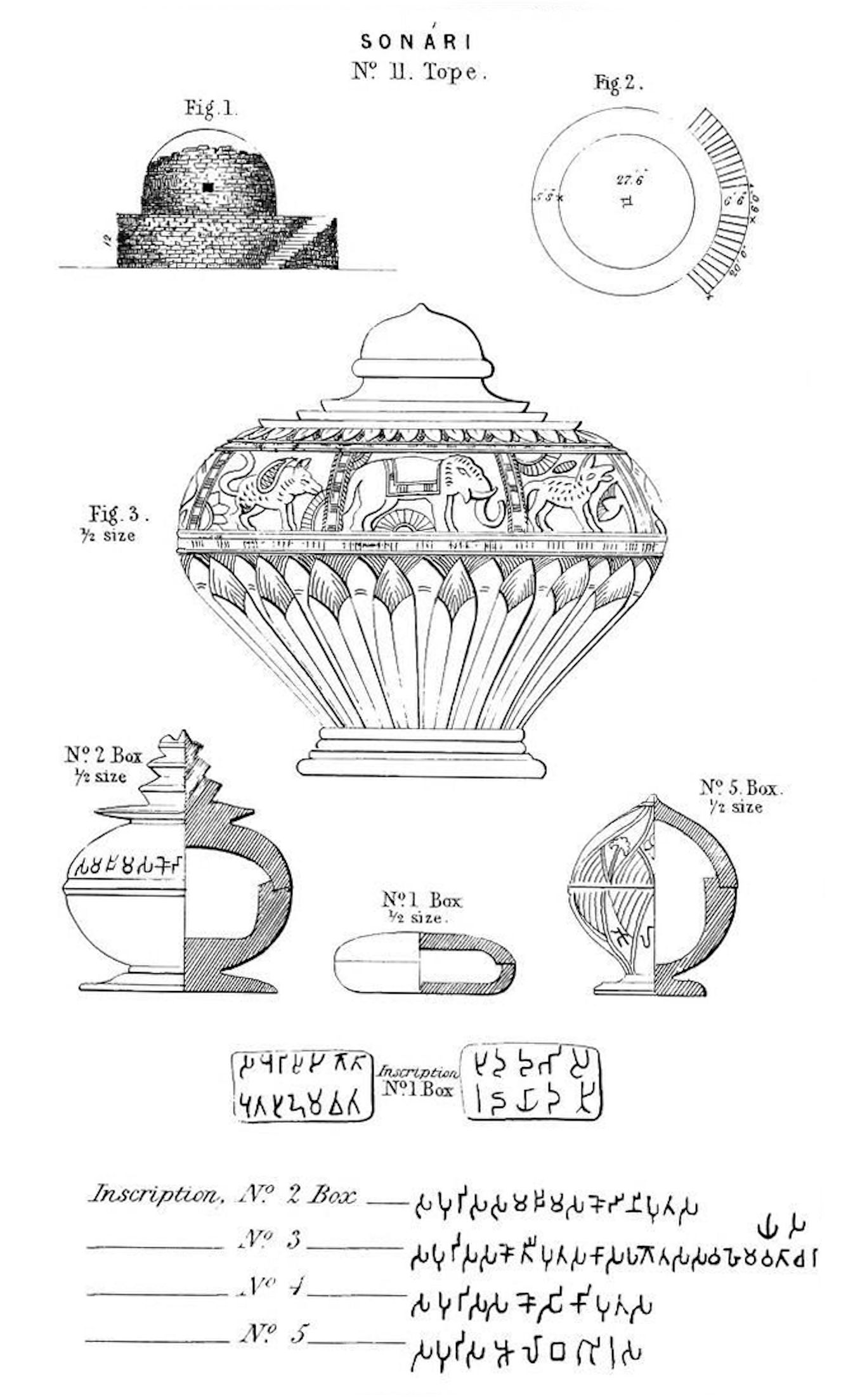
Relics of Stupa No.2.
