= Saru Maru =

Archaeological site in Madhya Pradesh, India

- Saru Maru
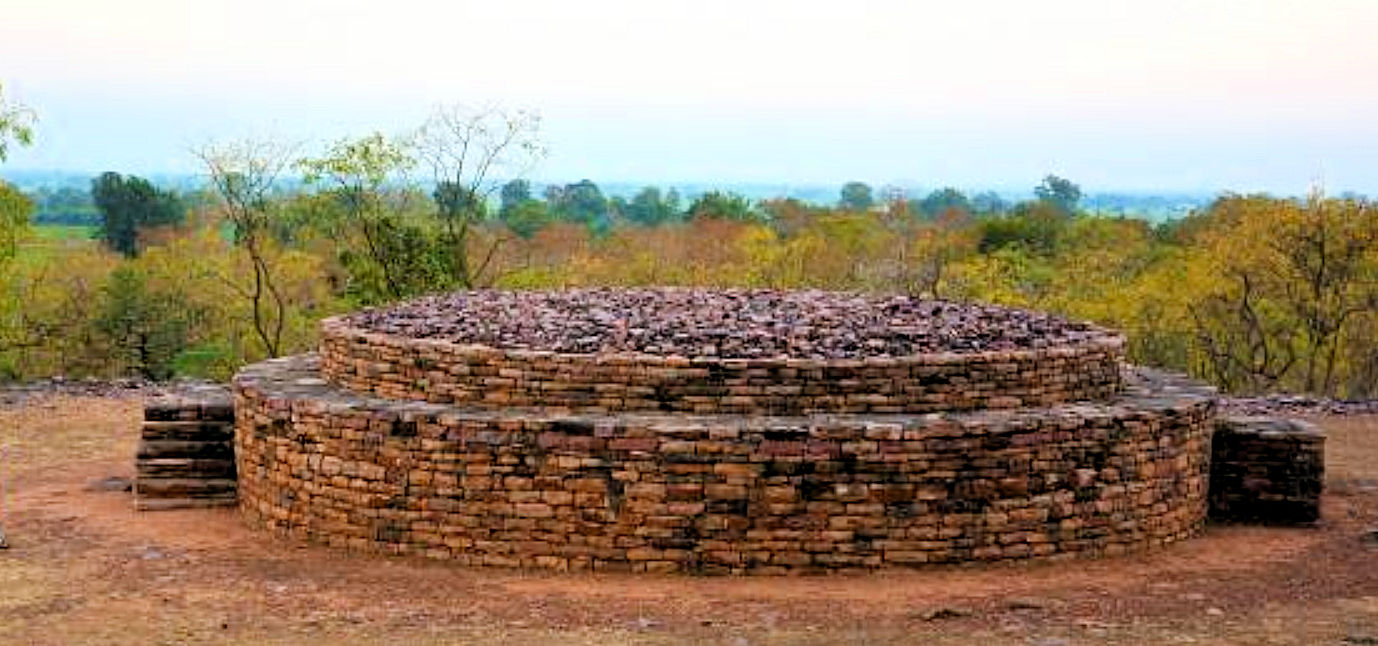
- The great stupa of Saru Maru

- Location within India Location within Madhya Pradesh
- 22.729949°N 77.519910°E
- Type: Buddhist settlement, stupas and caves
- Satellite of: Pangoraria

Saru Maru is the archaeological site of an ancient monastic complex and Buddhist caves. The site is located near the village of Pangoraria, Budhani Tehsil, Sehore District, Madhya Pradesh, India. The site is about 120 km south of Sanchi.

== Description ==
The site contains a number of stupas as well as natural caves for monks. In the caves many Buddhist graffiti have been found (swastika, triratna, kalasa ...). In the main cave were found two inscriptions of Ashoka: a version of the Minor Rock Edict n°1, one of the Edicts of Ashoka, and another inscription mentioning the visit of Piyadasi (honorific name used by Ashoka in his inscriptions) as Maharahakumara (Prince).

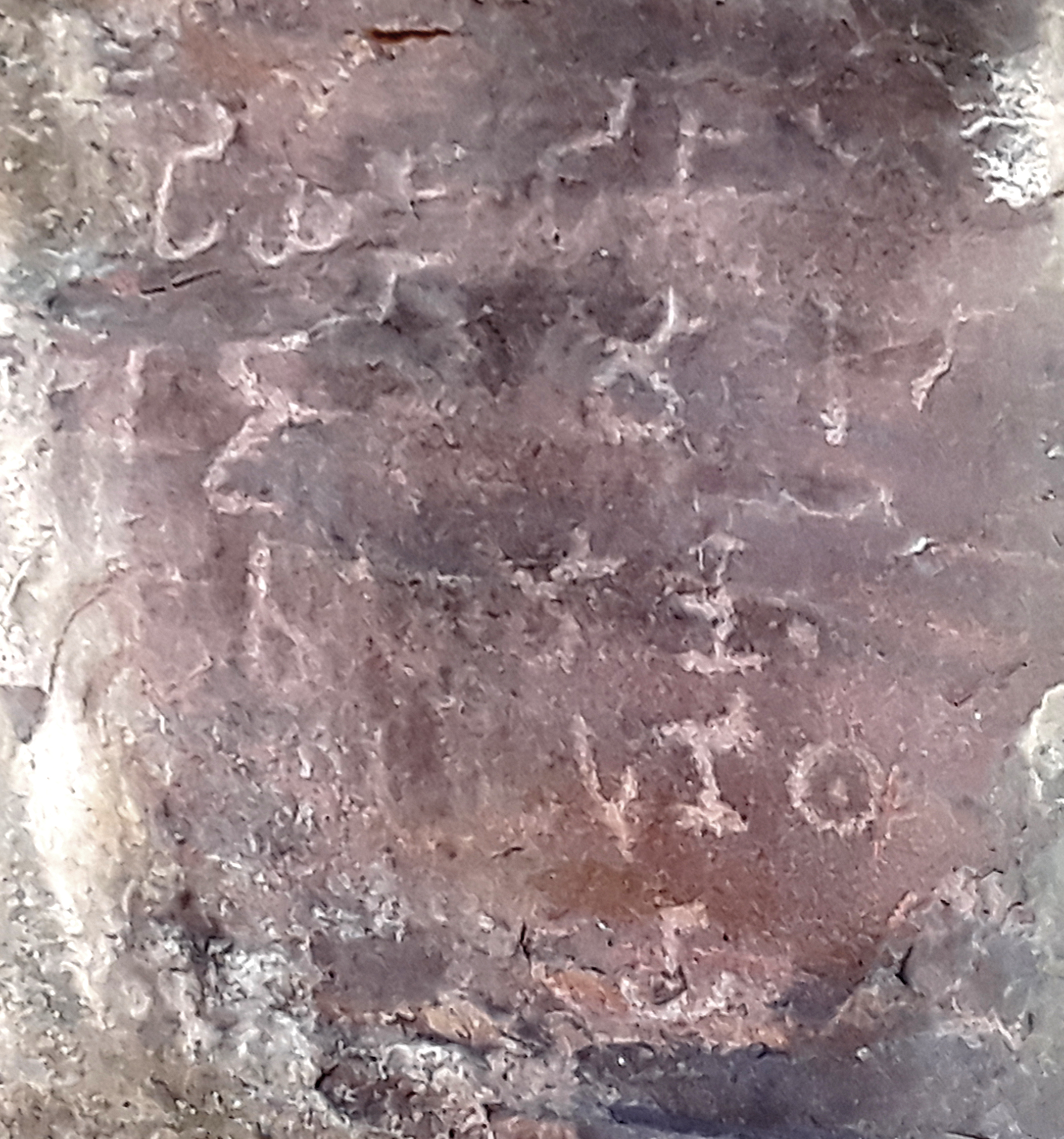
The commemorative inscription

Piyadasi nama/ rajakumala va/ samvasamane/ imam desam papunitha/ vihara(ya)tay(e)

"The king, who (now after consecration) is called "Piyadasi", (once) came to this place for a pleasure tour while still a (ruling) prince, living together with his unwedded consort."

— Commemorative Inscription of the visit of Ashoka, Saru Maru. Translated by Falk.

According to the inscription, it would seem that Ashoka visited this Buddhist monastic complex while he was still a prince, and viceroy of the region of Madhya Pradesh, while his residence was to be at Vidisha. In the Buddhist tradition, Ashoka's wife was called Vidishadevi.

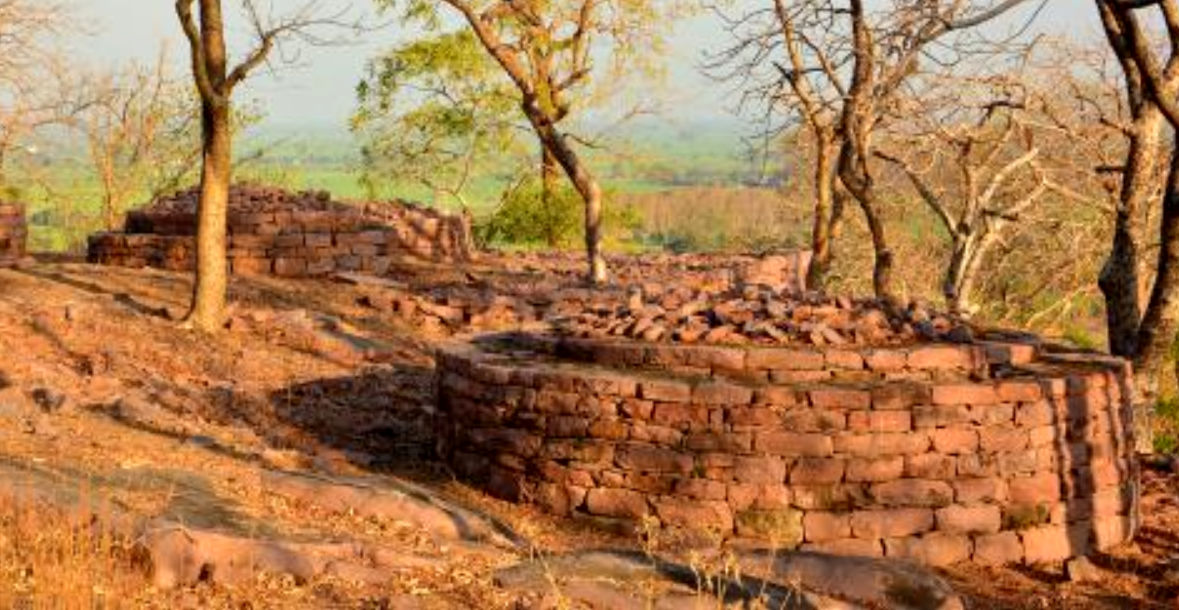
Small stupas on the hill of Saru Maru.

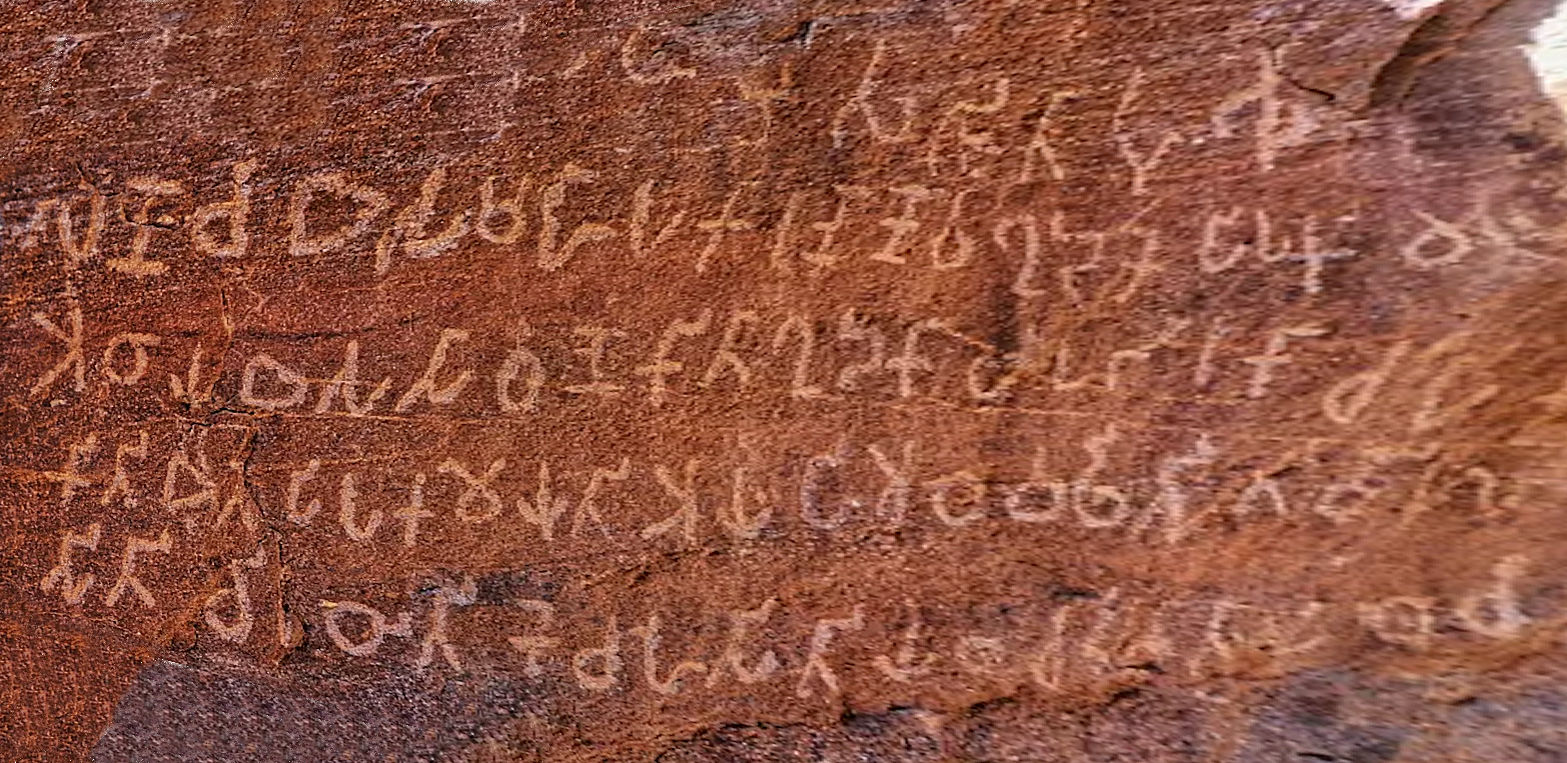
An inscription of Ashoka in one of the Saru Maru caves. It is a portion of Minor Rock Edict No.1.

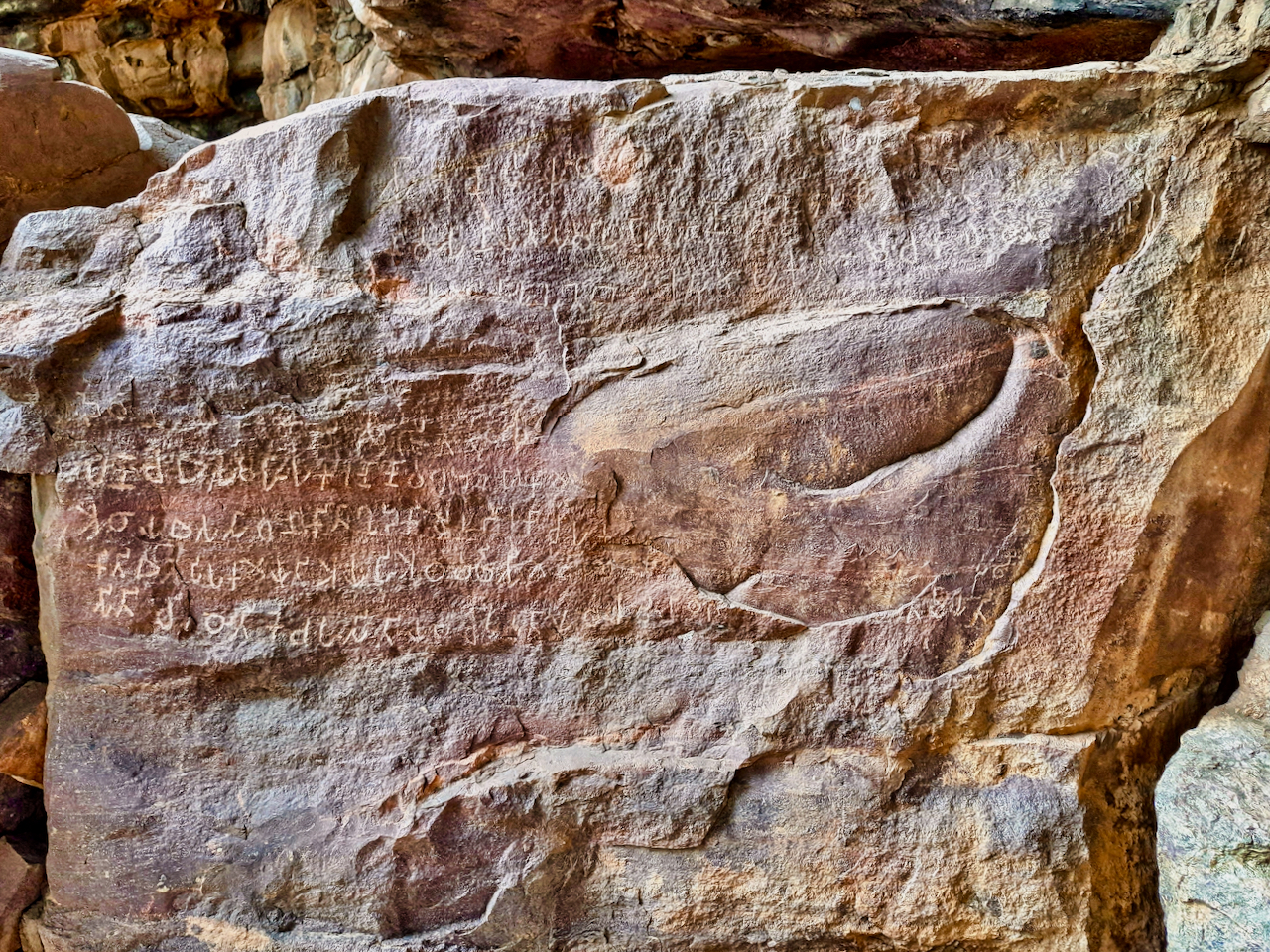
View of the Minor Edicts in-situ

== Full commemorative inscription ==
Commemorative inscription of Ashoka from Saru Maru, Madhya Pradesh.
Translation
(English)

The king, who (now after consecration) is called "Piyadasi", (once) came to this place for a pleasure tour while still a (ruling) prince, living together with his unwedded consort.

— Commemorative Inscription of the visit of Ashoka, Saru Maru. Translated by Falk.

Transliteration

Piyadasi nāma
rajakumala va
samvasamane
imam desam papunitha
vihara(ya)tay(e)

Transcription
(Brahmi script)

𑀧𑀺𑀬𑀤𑀲𑀺 𑀦𑀸𑀫
𑀭𑀸𑀚𑀓𑀼𑀫𑀮 𑀯
𑀲𑀁𑀯𑀲𑀫𑀦𑁂
𑀇𑀫𑀁 𑀤𑁂𑀲𑀁 𑀧𑀧𑀼𑀦𑀺𑀣
𑀯𑀺𑀳𑀭𑀬𑀢𑀬𑁂

Inscription
(Prakrit in the Brahmi script)

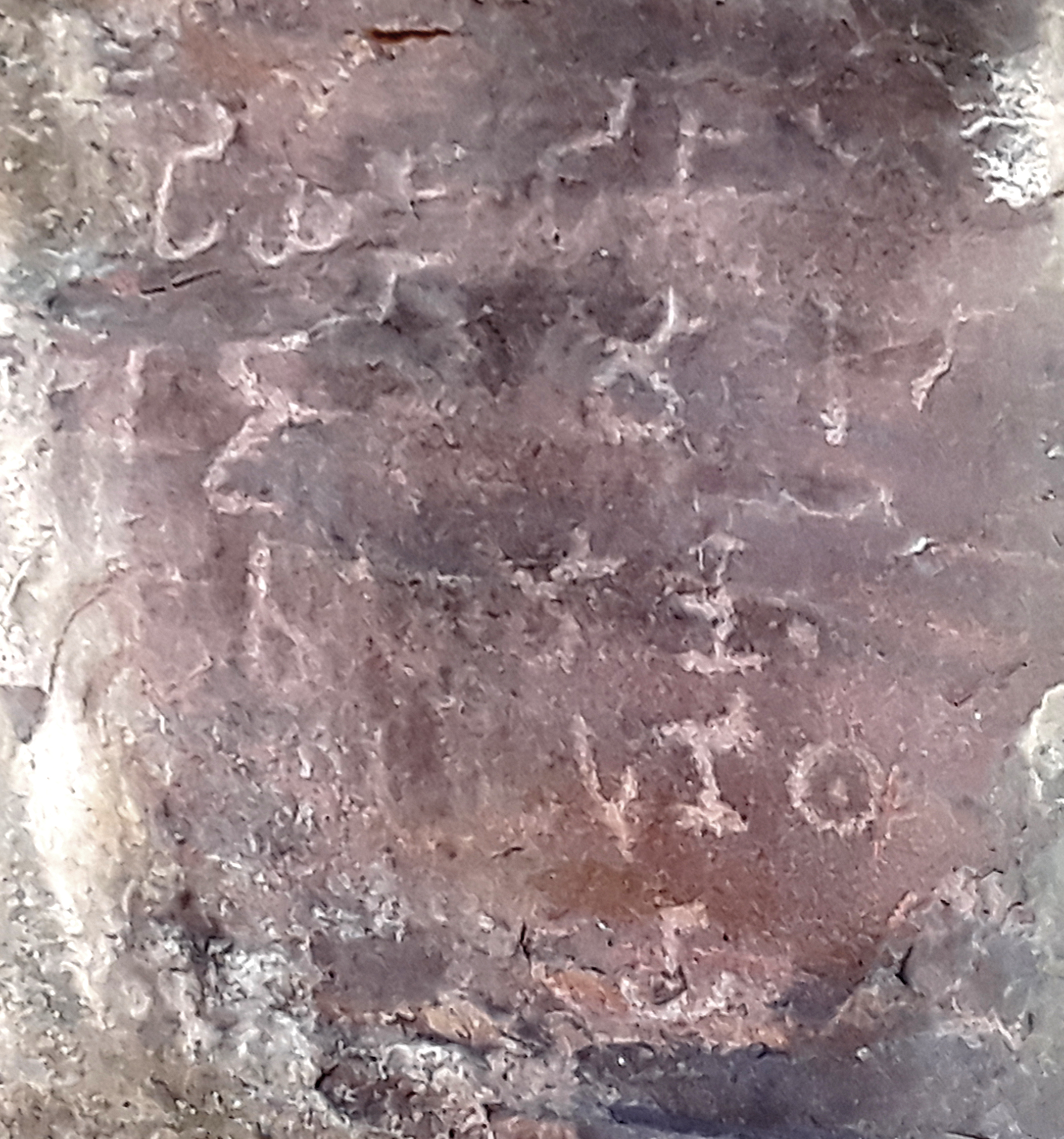
