= Amalaka =

Stone disk on the top of a Hindu temple's main tower

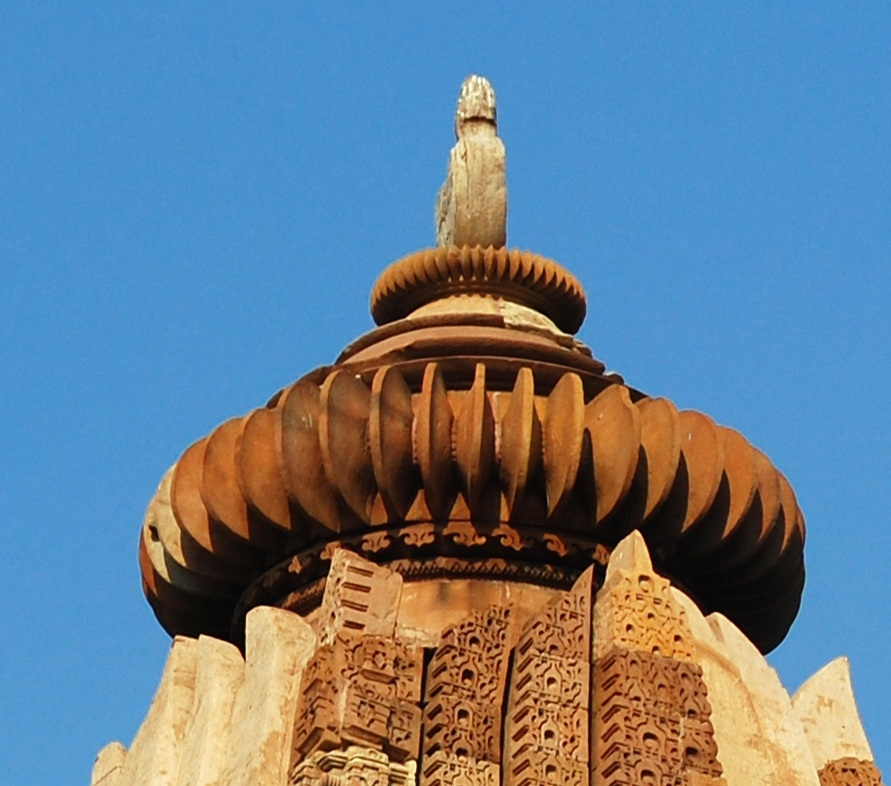
Double amalaka at the top of the Devi Jagadambi Temple at Khajuraho

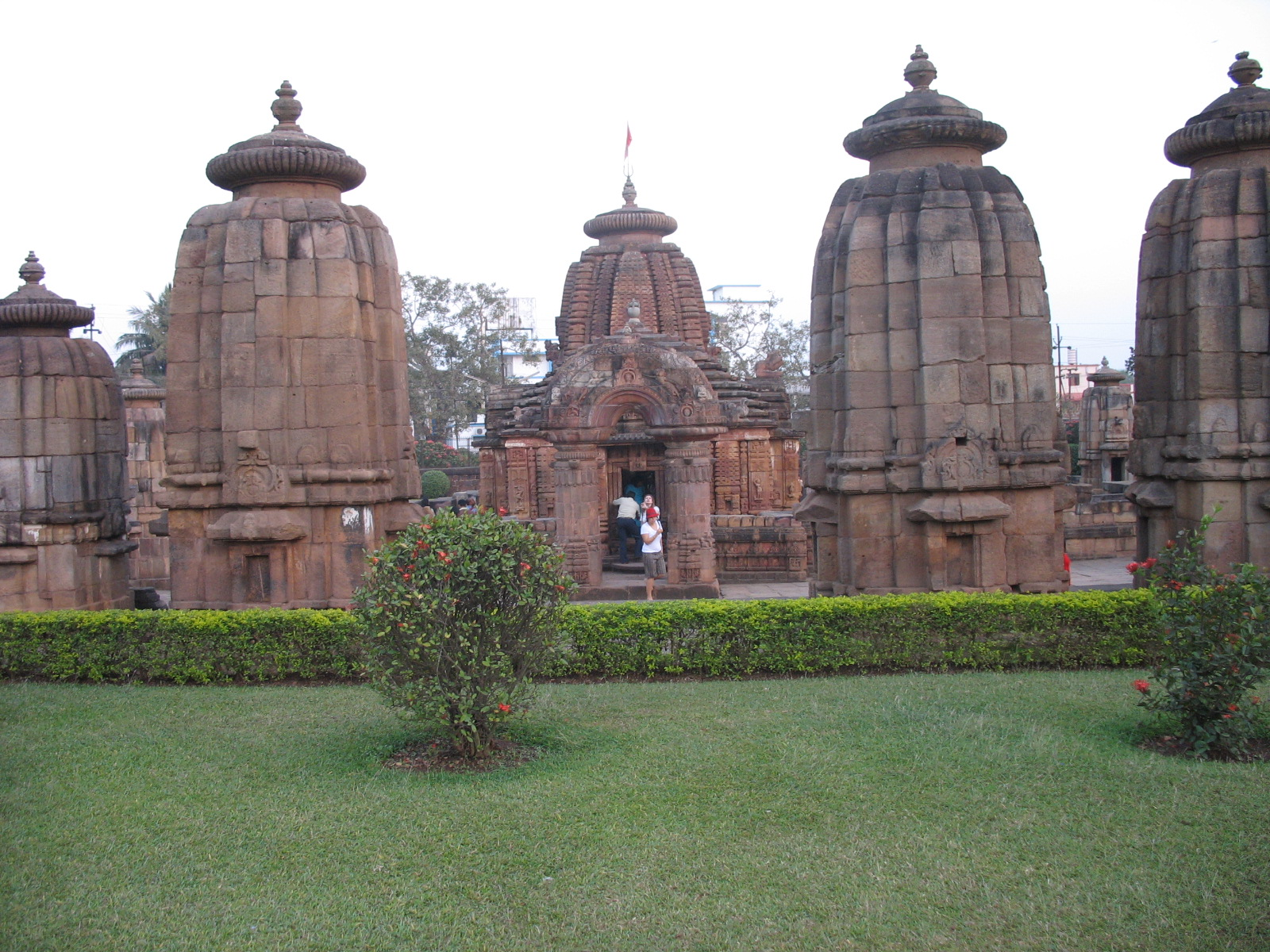
Prominent amalakas at the Siddheshwar Mukteshwar Group Temple, Bhubaneswar

An amalaka (Sanskrit: आमलक) is a notched stone disk similar to an indented wheel that sits on the top of a shikhara of Nagara style Hindu temples, serving as a crown of the temple.

According to one interpretation, the amalaka represents a lotus, and thus the symbolic seat for the deity below. Another interpretation is that it symbolizes the sun, and is thus the gateway to the heavenly world.

The name and, according to some sources the shape, of the amalaka comes from the fruit of Phyllanthus emblica (or Mirobalanus embilica), the Indian gooseberry, or myrobolan fig tree. This is called āmalaki in Sanskrit, and the fruit has a slightly segmented shape, though this is much less marked than in the architectural shape.

The amalaka itself is crowned with a kalasha or finial, from which a temple banner is often hung.

== Etymology ==
Amalaka is a Sanskrit word that is a derivative of the root word 'mal', meaning 'to hold' or 'to gather', which describes the role the amalaka plays in temple architecture.

Amalaka has several variations in spelling, each with its own unique meaning. Amala beginning with a 'short a' means 'without impurities'. This variation is primarily used by Buddhists, who refer to the stone as Amalashila, meaning 'pure stone'. Another variation in its name is Amalasara, meaning 'pure essence'. Both Amalashila and Amalasara describe the celestial world, in which the amalaka serves as the 'door of liberation'.

In Vastu shastra, Amalaka is written beginning with a 'long a', referring to the Emblic Myroblan fruit due to its resemblance in shape. Additionally, in Vastu shastra, the Amalaka is also referred to as 'Anda', meaning 'egg'.

== History ==
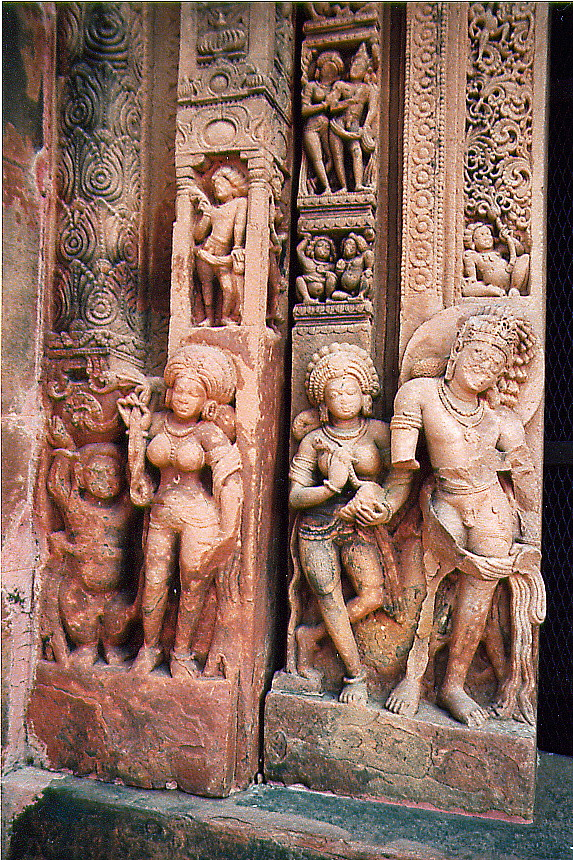
Door jab with amalaka, above a gavaksha, Dashavatara Temple, Deogarh

The shape first appears (or survives) as an element in the capitals of columns around the time of Ashoka in the 3rd century BCE, recurring in some capitals of the 1st century CE. In some of these, as at the Great Chaitya at the Karla Caves, and the verandahs to Caves 3, 10 and 17 at the Pandavleni Caves, the amalaka is "boxed" with a rectangular framework cage.

The oldest representation of an amalaka as the base for the kalasha is seen in a doorjamb at the Dashavatara temple at Deogarh, dated to about 500 AD. Amalakas appear to have been common at the top of shikhara by the Gupta period, though no originals remain in place. They were to remain standard in most of India, in the Nagara and Kalinga architecture styles of the west and east respectively, but not in the Dravidian architecture of South India. Some early temples in the Deccan, such as the 7th-century Lakshamana temple in brick at Sirpur, have amalakas at the corners of some level of the shikhara (but not, as it survives, at the top in the usual way).

== Form and placement ==
The amalaka is shaped like a ring stone, and has a cogged rim similar to indented wheel.

The amalaka sits atop the shikharas of a temple, surrounding its central shaft, and can also be found atop mandapas. In addition to serving as the crown of the temple, the amalaka is also a clasp that locks together the stones in the shikhara structure.

Sitting atop the amalaka is the stupika, or the finial, which is either made of or plated with gold. The most recognizable part of the stupika is the kalasha.

== Meaning and symbolism ==
Like other parts of Hindu temple architecture, there is a large body of symbolic and mystical interpretation around the amalaka. It is seen as a ring gripping and embracing a notional pillar that rises from the main cult image of the deity below it in the sanctum, and reaches up to heaven through the top of the temple.

The kalasha which sits atop the amalaka represents the sun, and amalaka represents the sun's rays. The amalaka is thought to encompass the celestial world.

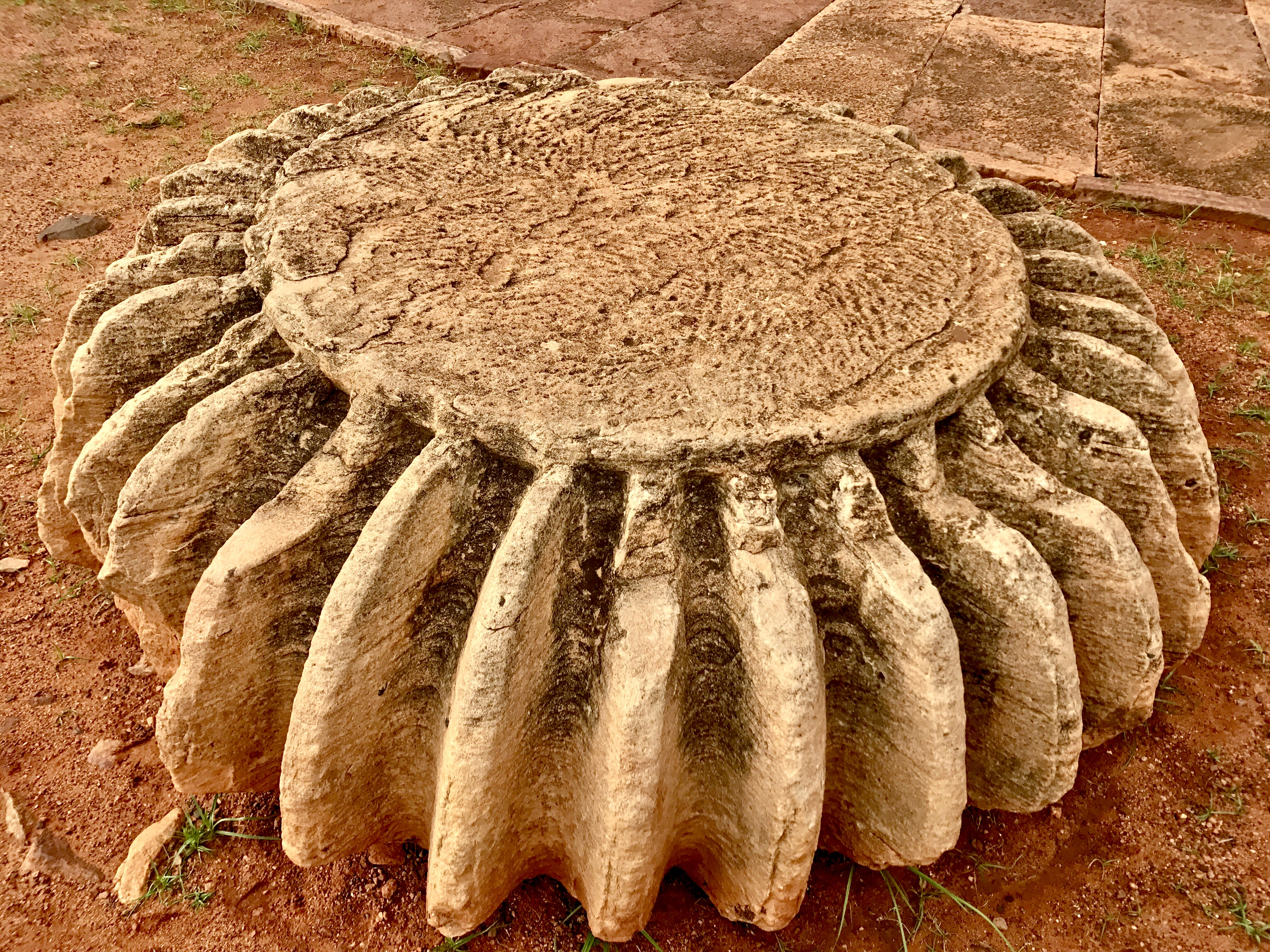
Detached amalaka stone of the Durga Temple, Aihole, 7th century

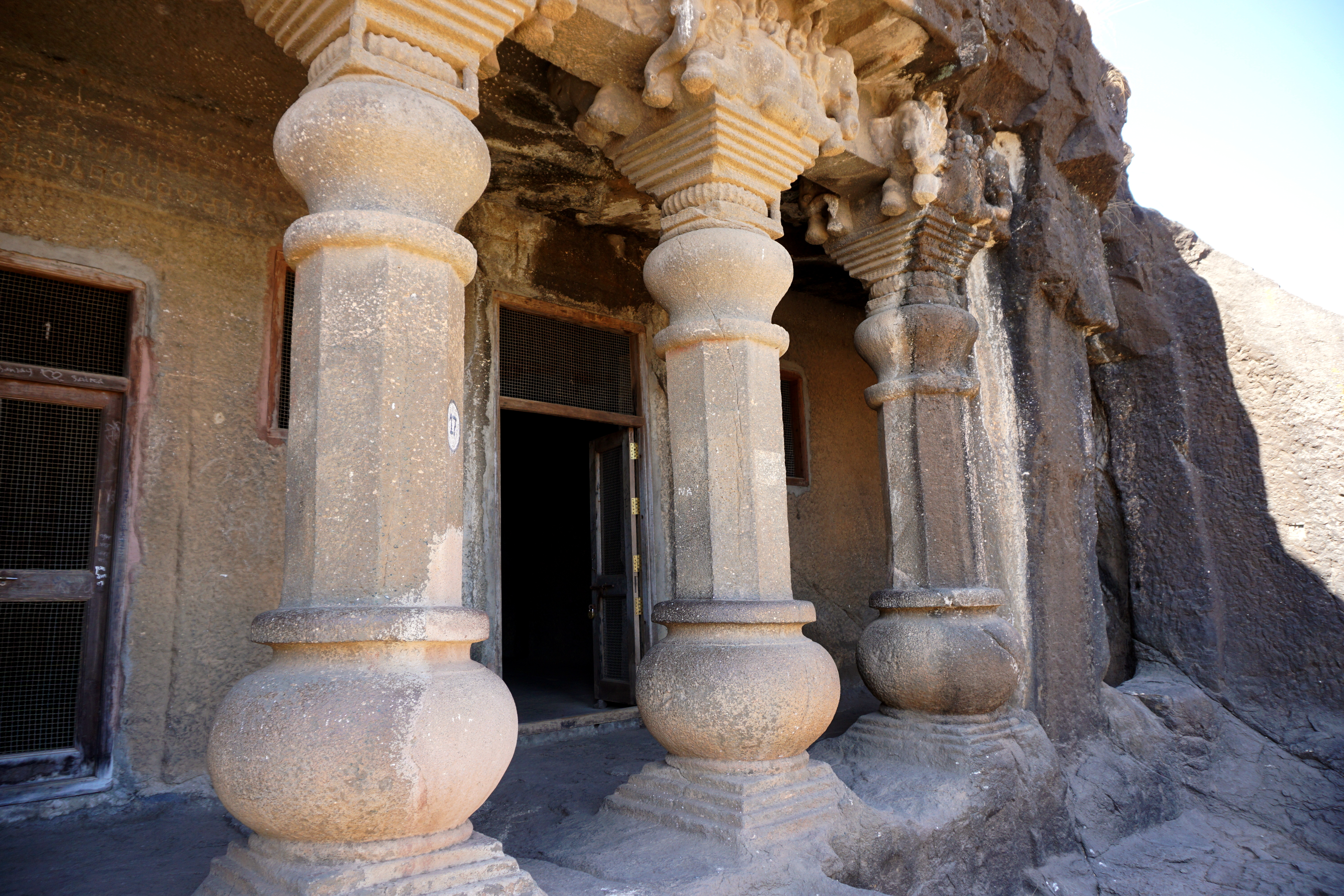
"Boxed" amalakas in the capitals outside Cave 17, Pandavleni Caves, 2nd-3rd century CE

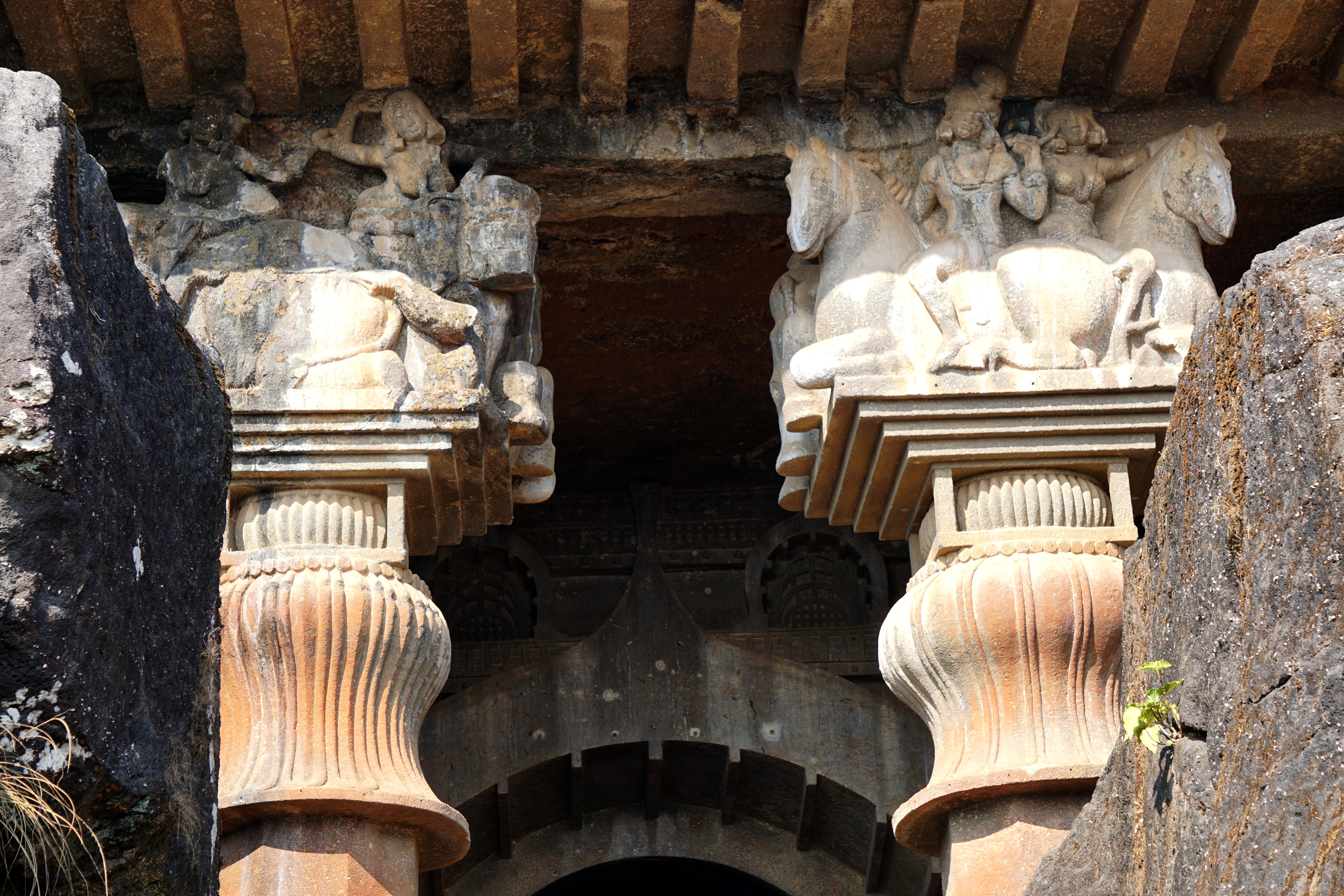
"Boxed" amalakas in the capitals, Bedse Caves

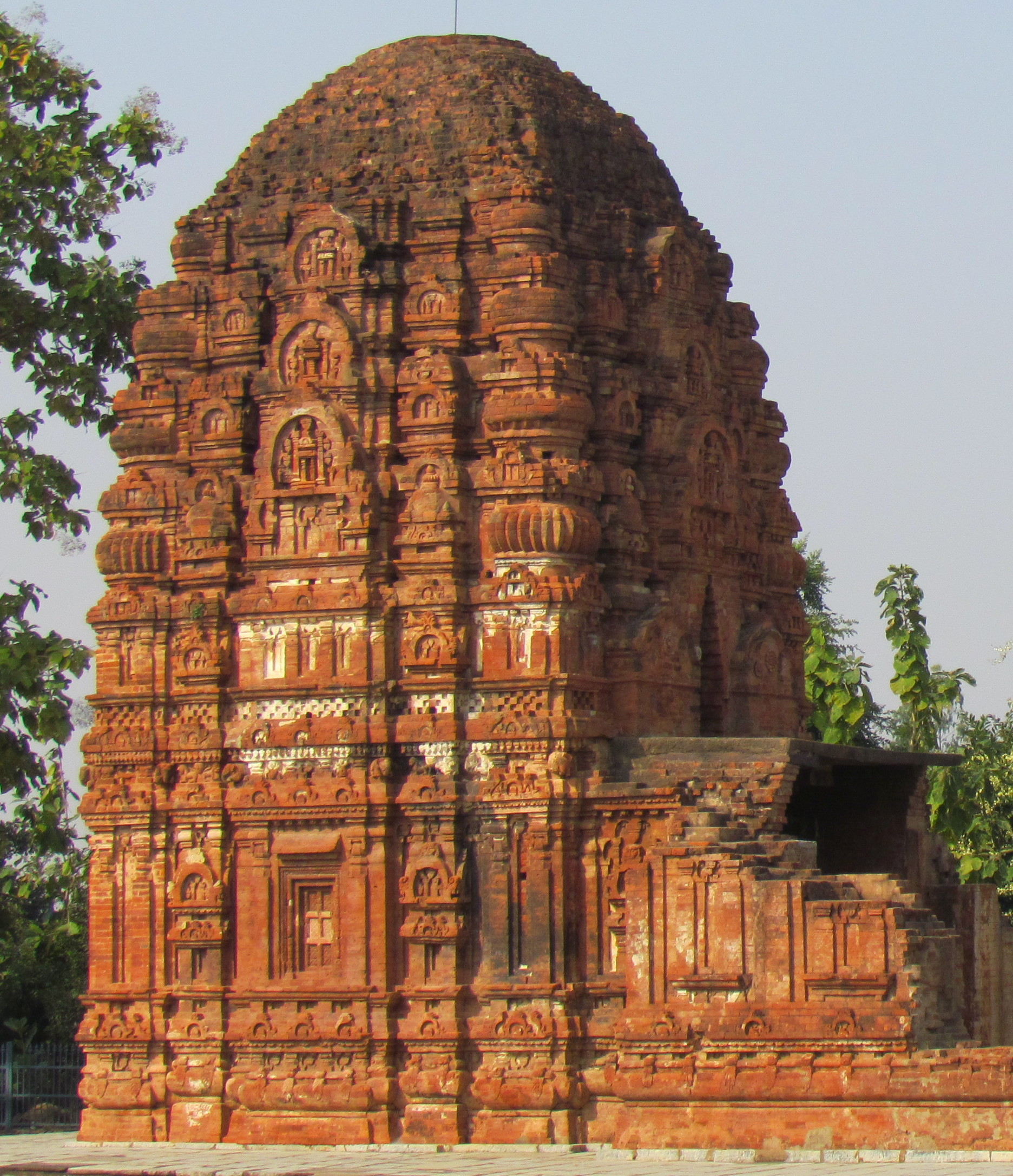
Corner amalakas at the 7th-century Lakshamana temple in brick at Sirpur

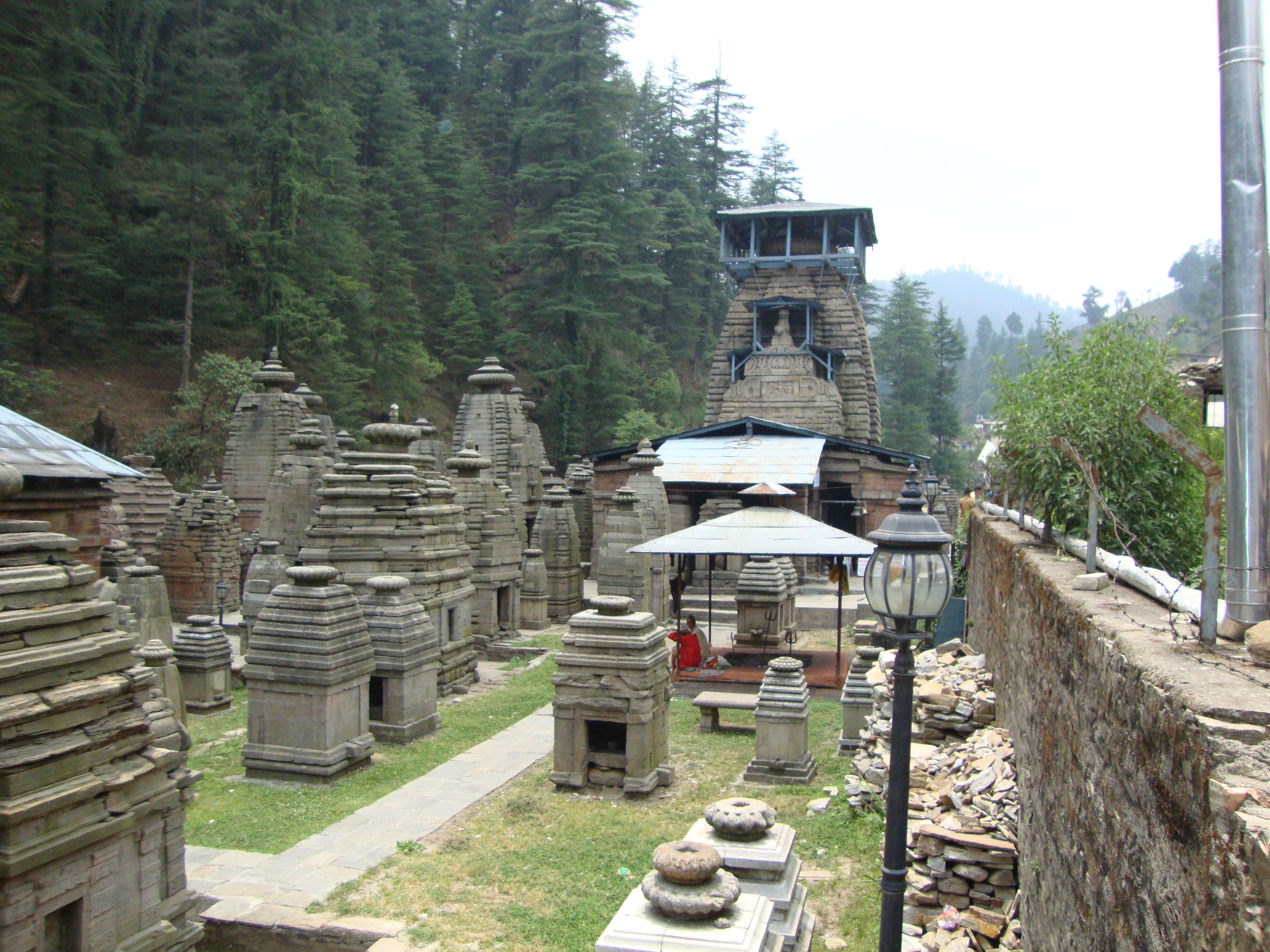
7-12th century temples at Jageshwar, Uttarakhand. In some of them the amalakas are boxed to hold a roof.

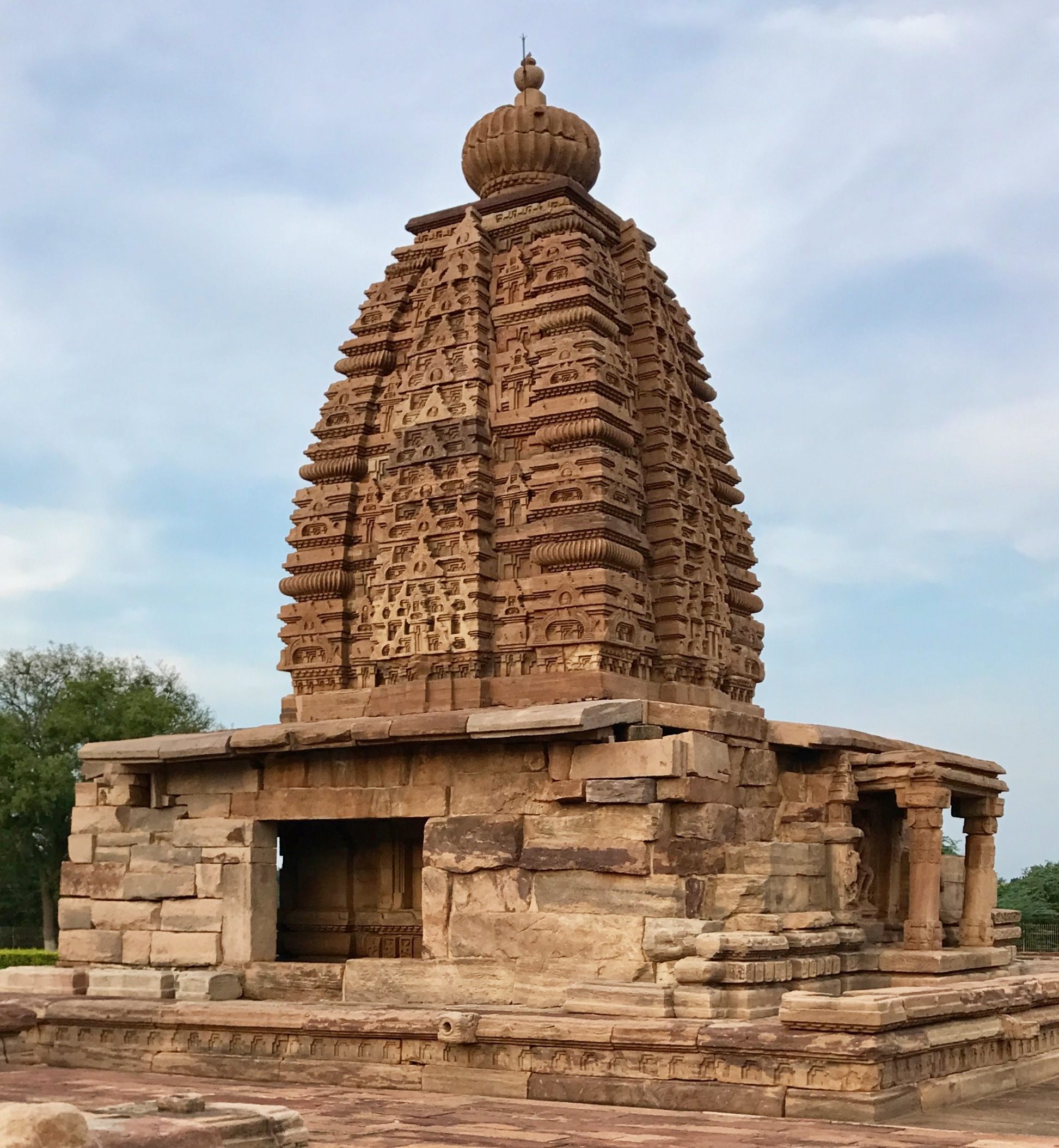
Early, rounded, amalaka, with squared amalakas at the corners below, 8th century. Galaganatha Temple, Pattadakal, Karnataka
