= Valinath Mahadev Temple =

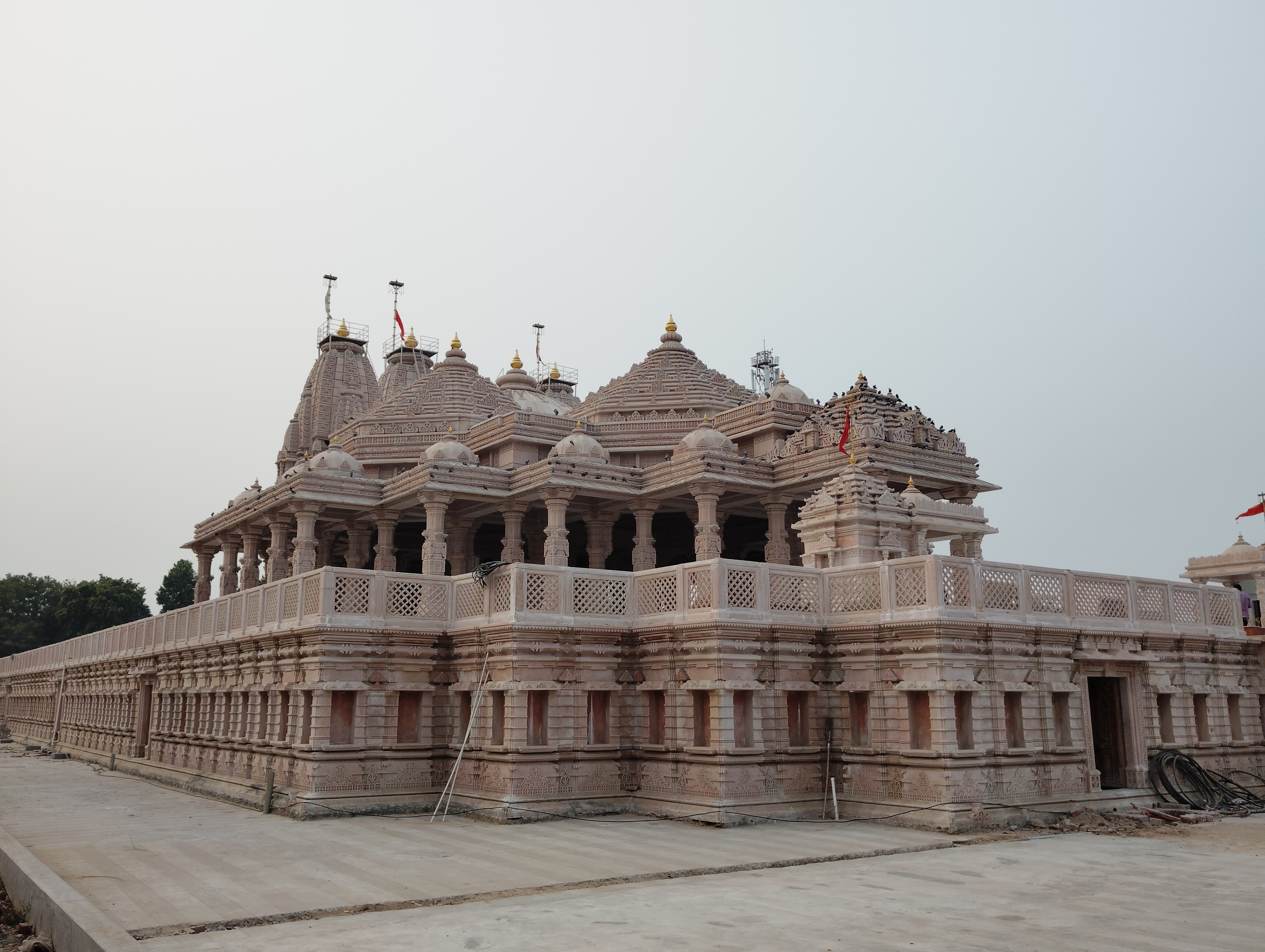

- Location in Gujarat

Religion
- Affiliation: Hinduism
- Deity: Valinath Mahadev
- Governing body: Valinath Mahadev Mandir Trust

Location
- Location: Tarabh
- State: Mehsana district, Gujarat
- Country: India
- Interactive map of Valinath Mahadev Temple
- Coordinates: 23.752039°N 72.45765°E

Architecture
- Type: Hindu temple architecture
- Style: Nagara Style (Maru-Gurjara architecture)
- Groundbreaking: 2011
- Completed: 2024

Specifications
- Direction of façade: East
- Length: 265 ft (81 m)
- Width: 165 ft (50 m)
- Height (max): 101 feet
- Materials: Bansi Paharpur pink stone

Website
- Official website

Valinath Mahadev Temple is a Hindu temple, dedicated to Shiva, located in Tarabh village in Visnagar Taluka of Mehsana district, Gujarat, India. It was opened in February 2024.

== History ==
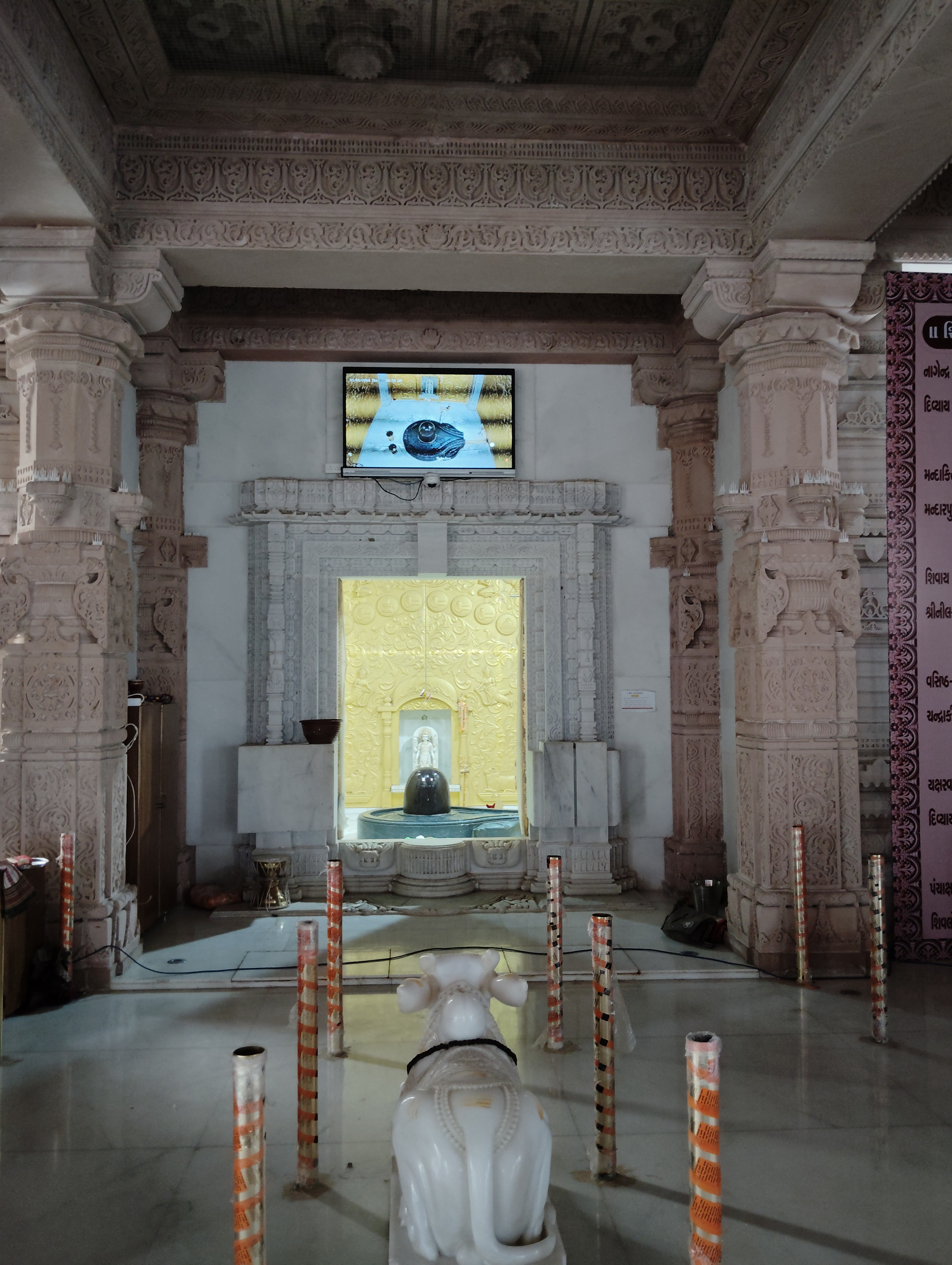
Central sanctum

The temple site has a history of about 900 years. The seat of the temple was held by Viramgiri Bapu who founded the original temple. It is currently held by the 14th successor Jayramgiri Bapu. The temple is a centre of faith of Rabari caste as well as other Hindu castes. The foundation of the new temple was laid in 2011. The construction was completed in 2024. The prana pratishtha ceremony held over a week from 16 to 22 February 2024. The event was attended Prime Minister Narendra Modi and other politicians on last day. Around 5 lakh people attended the ceremony. It is the second largest Shiva temple in Gujarat, next to the Somnath temple.

== Architecture ==
The temple is built in Nagara Style of Hindu temple architecture. It has three shikharas. The central sanctum houses a shivalinga of Valinath Mahadev while two secondary sanctums house Dattatreya and Hinglaj respectively. The central sanctum has the carvings of 12 jyotirlingas. The temple is 101 feet high, 265 feet long and 165 feet wide. It has 68 pillars. The construction used over 1.45 lakh cubic feet of stone. It is built primarily using Bansi Paharpur stone.

== Gallery ==
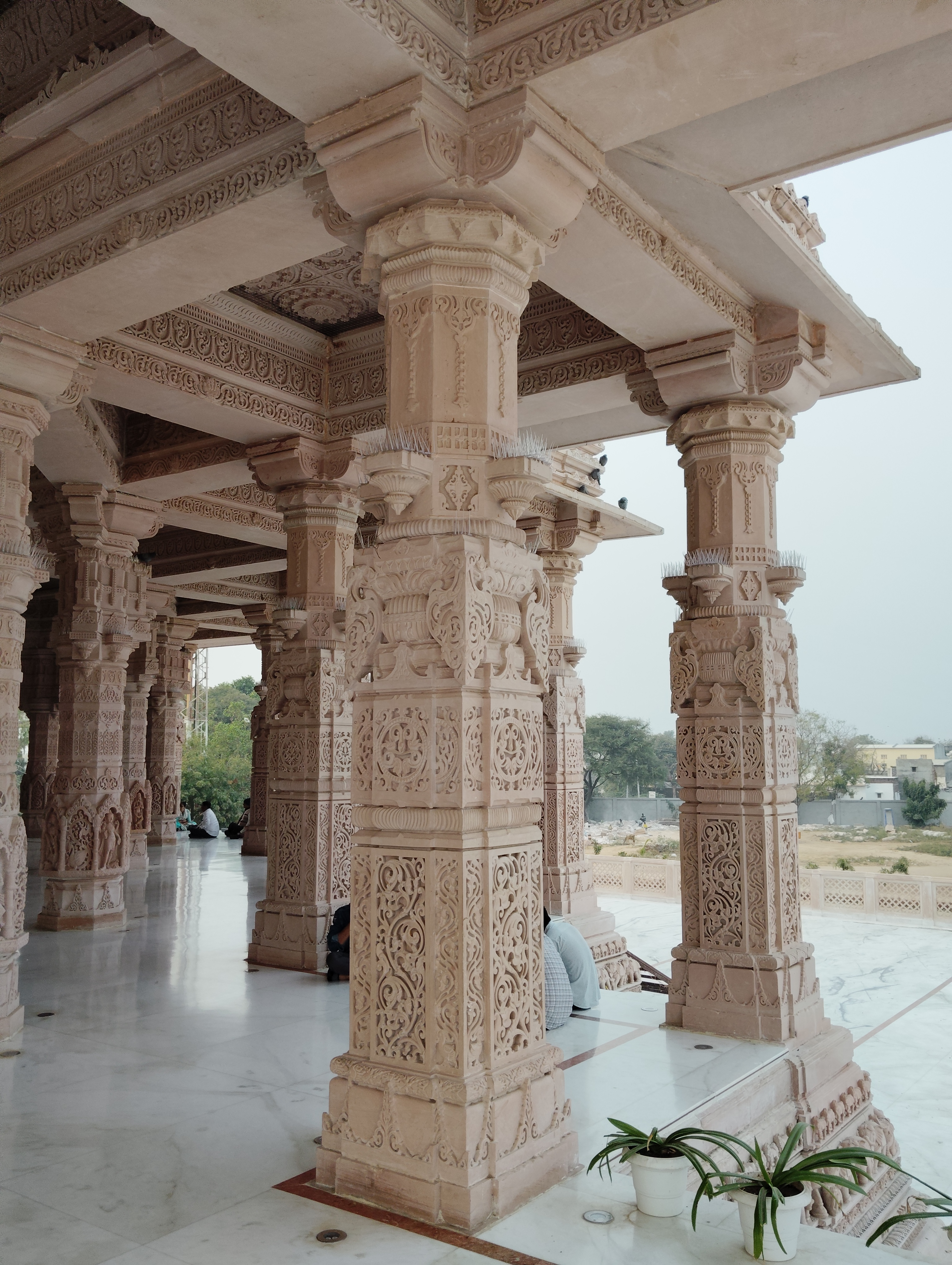
Pillars

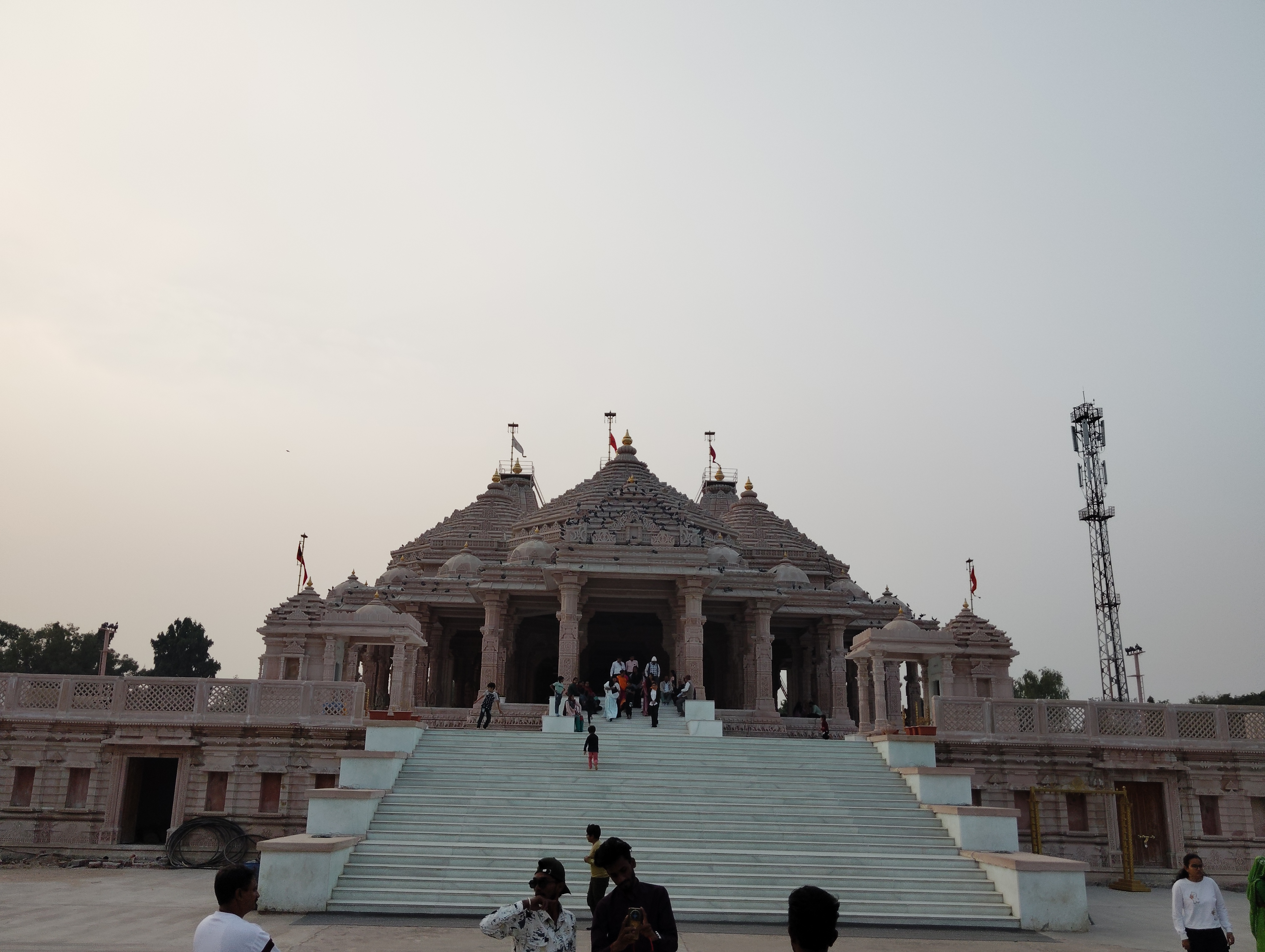
From front

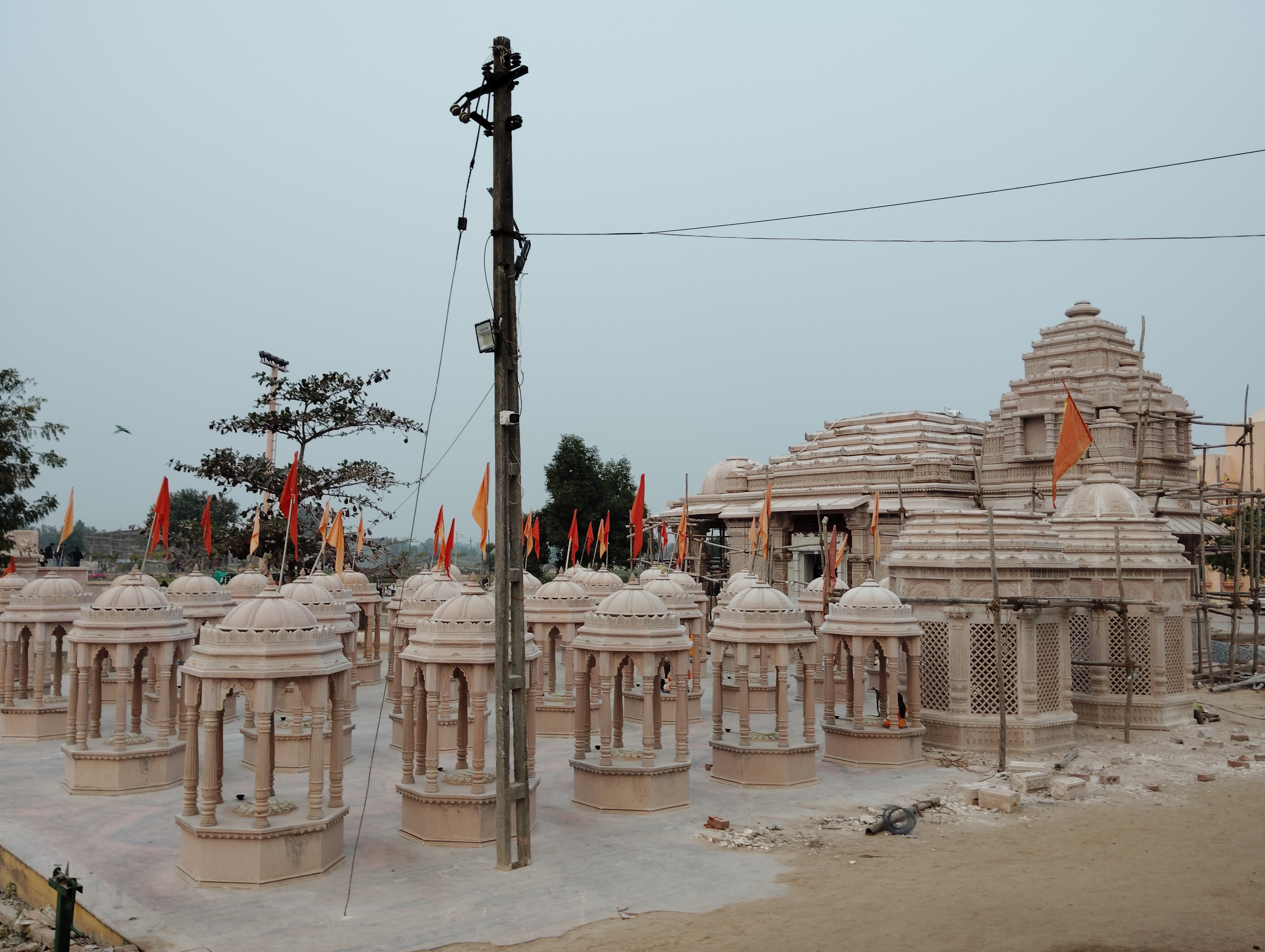
Memorial cenotaphs of Gurus

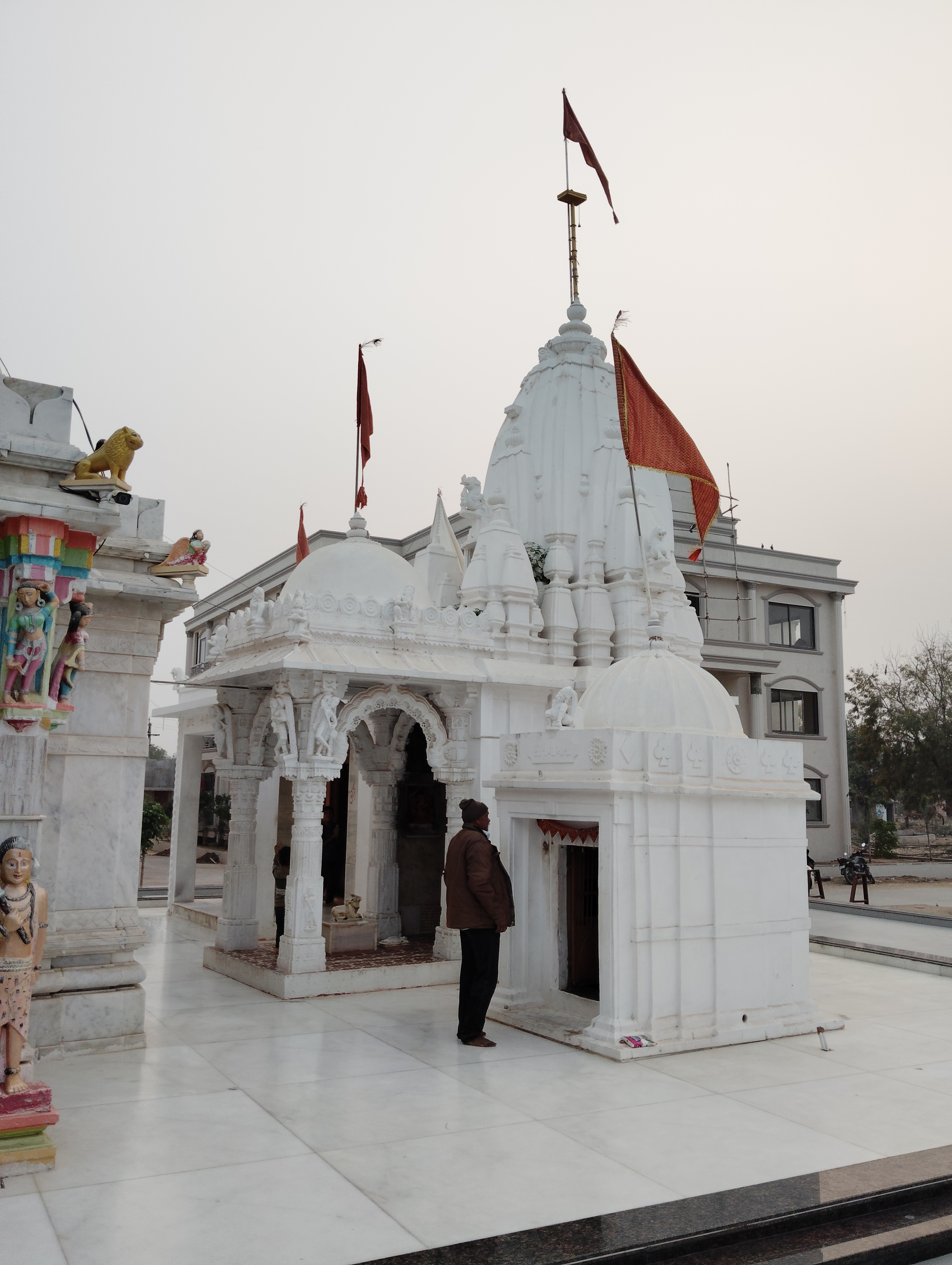
Old shrines
