= Chitragupta Temple, Khajuraho =

Chitragupta temple
- चित्रगुप्त मन्दिर
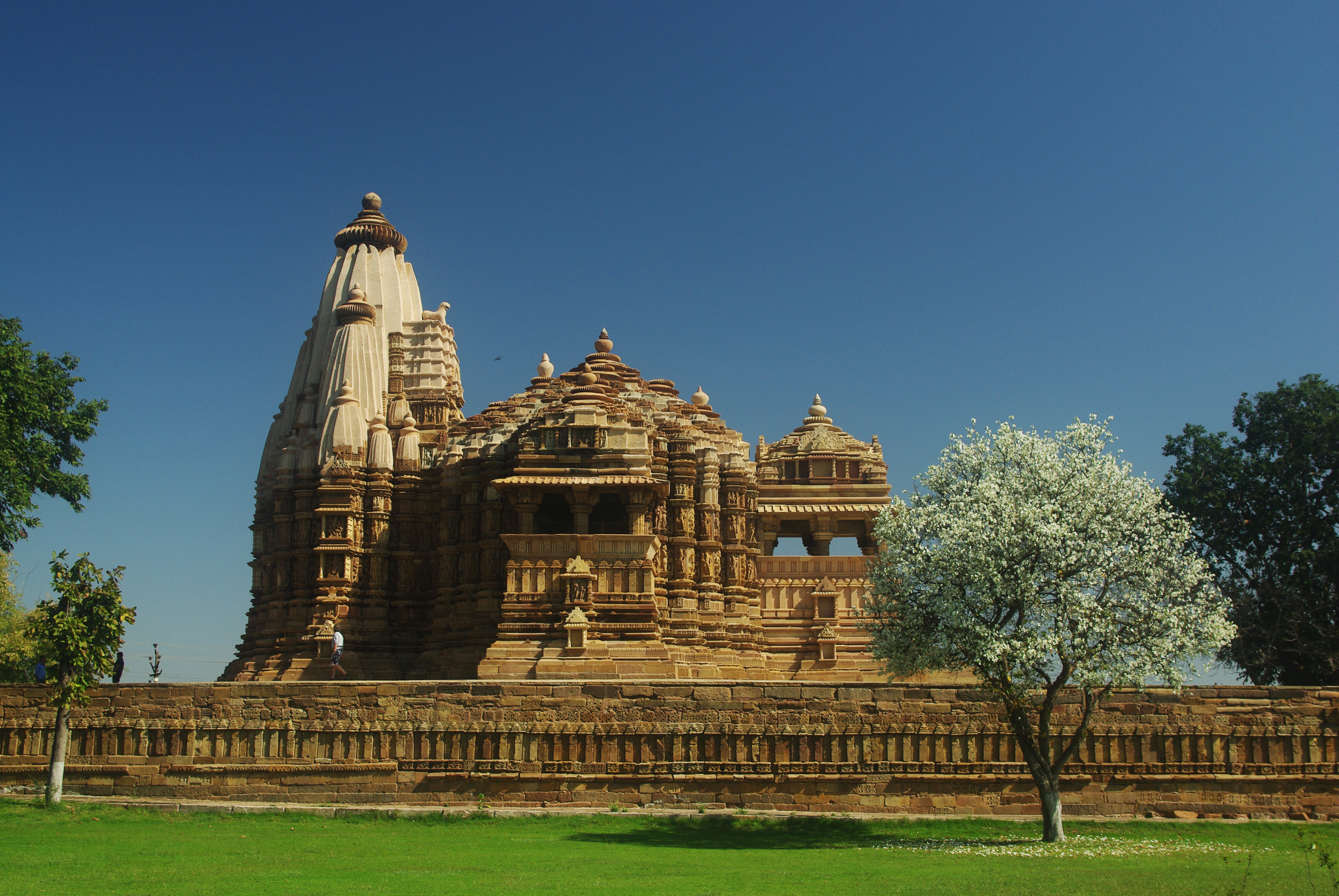

- Location in Madhya Pradesh, India Chitragupta Temple, Khajuraho (India)

Religion
- Affiliation: Hinduism
- District: Chhatarpur
- Deity: Surya

Location
- Location: Khajuraho
- State: Madhya Pradesh
- Country: India
- Coordinates: 24.8544234°N 79.9200664°E

Architecture
- Established: 11th century CE

The Chitragupta temple is an 11th century temple of Surya (sun god) in the Khajuraho town of Madhya Pradesh, India. Architecturally, it is very similar to the nearby Jagadambi temple. The temple is a part of the Khajuraho Group of Monuments, a World Heritage Site.

== History ==
Based on the epigraphic evidence, the temple's construction can be dated to 1020-1025 CE. It was probably consecrated on 23 February 1023 CE, on the occasion of Shivaratri.

The temple has been classified as a Monument of National Importance by the Archaeological Survey of India.

== Architecture ==
The Chitragupta temple is very similar to the nearby Jagadambi temple. It has a sanctum with a circumambulatory path, a vestibule, a maha-mandapa (large hall) with transepts, and an entrance porch. The large hall has an octagonal ceiling, which is more ornate than the corresponding ceiling in the Jagadambi temple. This suggests that the Chitragupta temple was constructed slightly later than the Jagadambi temple. The building has two balconies, and the ascending scale of the roof is not as impressive as that of the more prominent temples in Khajuraho.

The temple is part of the Khajuraho Group of Monuments, designated a World Heritage Site for its outstanding art and architecture.

== Sculptures ==
The temple's sanctum has a partially broken 2.1 metres (6.9 ft) tall statue of Surya riding a chariot of seven horses. He is shown standing, dressed in an armoured coat and boots, and holding lotus flowers. The door lintel of the sanctum also features three similar but smaller images of Surya.

The exterior walls of the temple are covered with erotic couples, surasundari, and various gods, including an 11-headed Vishnu. The Vishnu sculpture shows the god in his para rupa (supreme form) with his ten incarnations: this rare representation is not seen anywhere else, and does not find a mention in any historical text. Other sculptures include figures of couples engaged in mithuna, and the apsaras showing their yoni by holding their garments lower. There is also a sculpture of Shiva's attendant Nandi, who is shown with a human body and a bull's head.

These sculptures (and those in the Jagadambi temple) can be dated after the Vishvanatha sculptures and before the Kandariya Mahadeva sculptures.

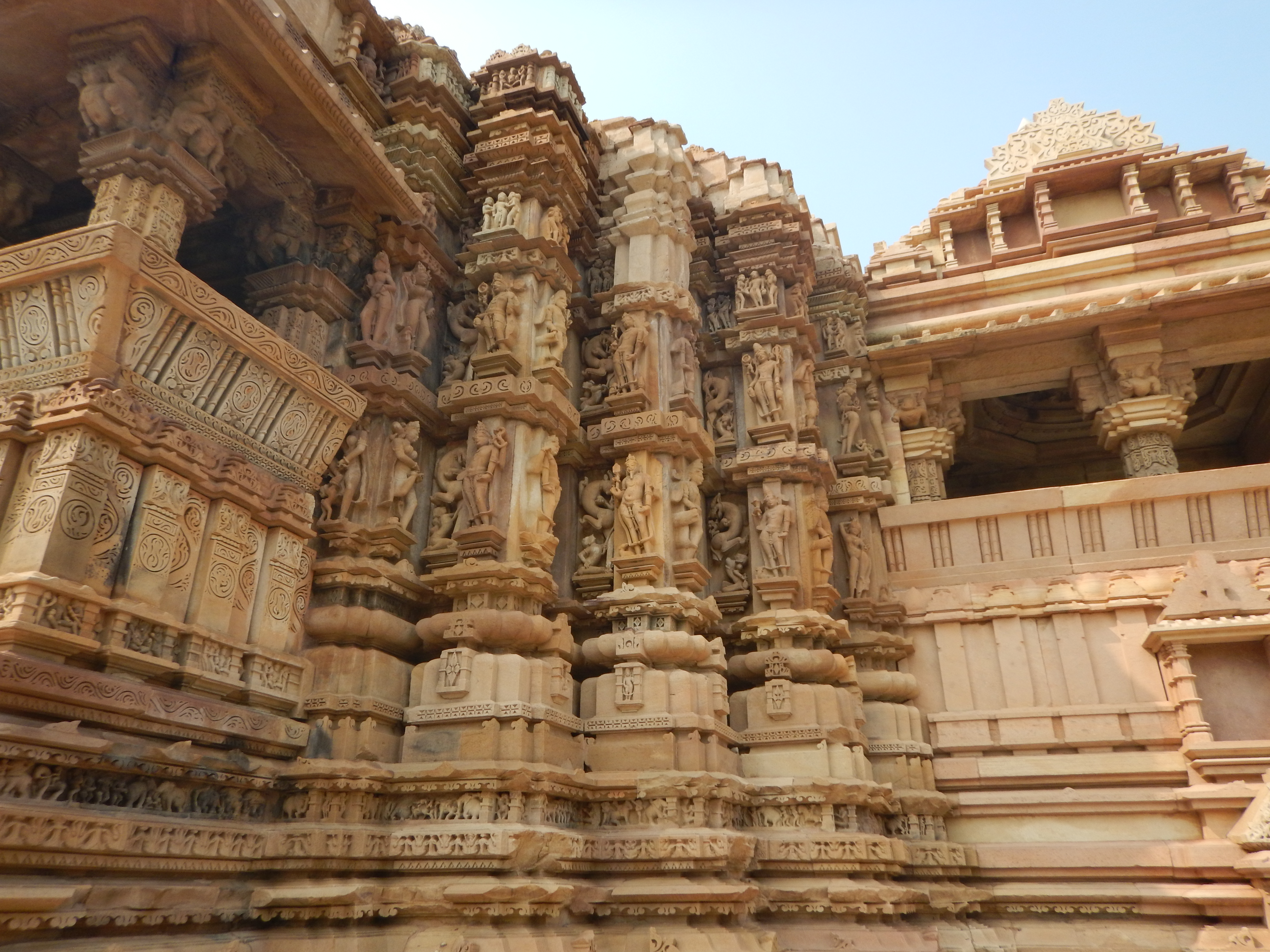
Exterior sculptures

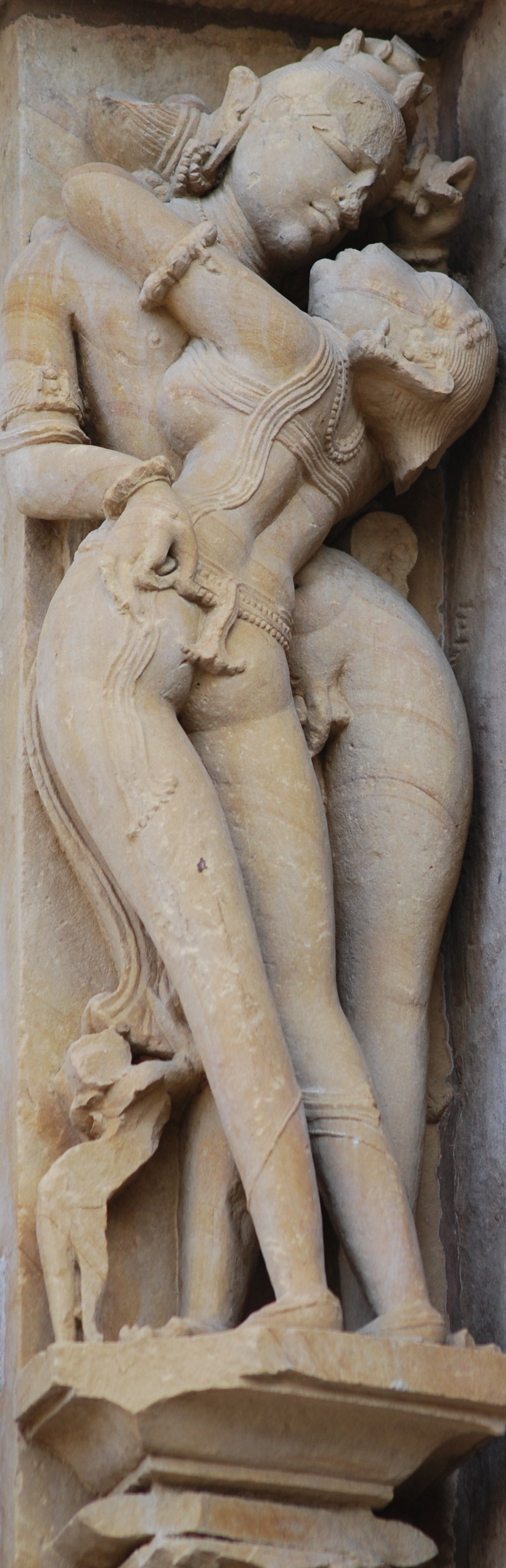
Mithuna couple

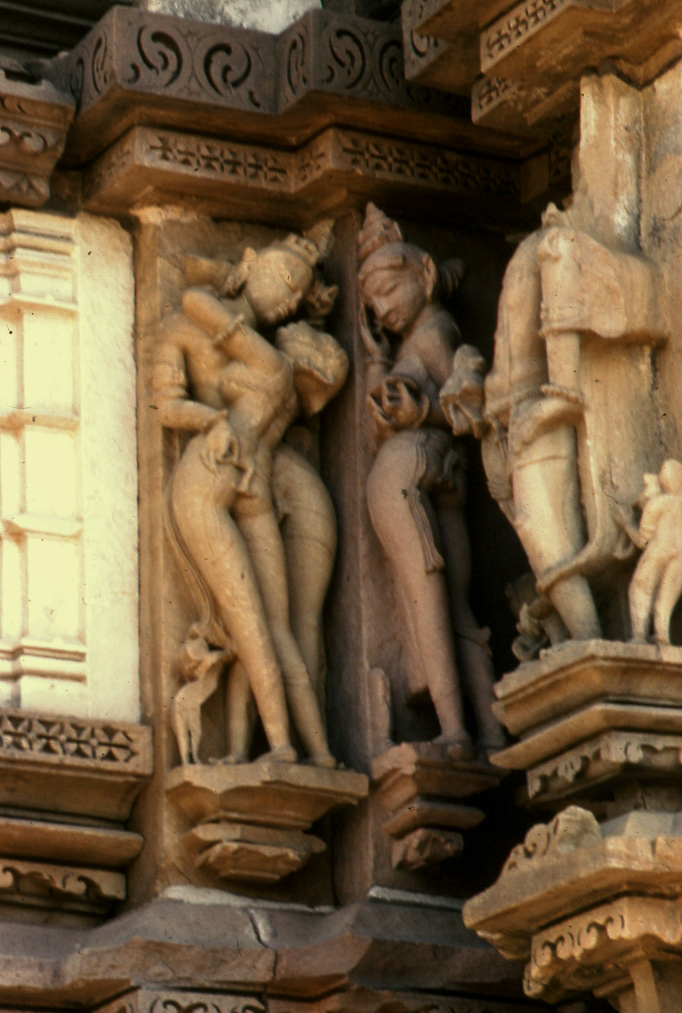
Apsara (right) exposes her yoni

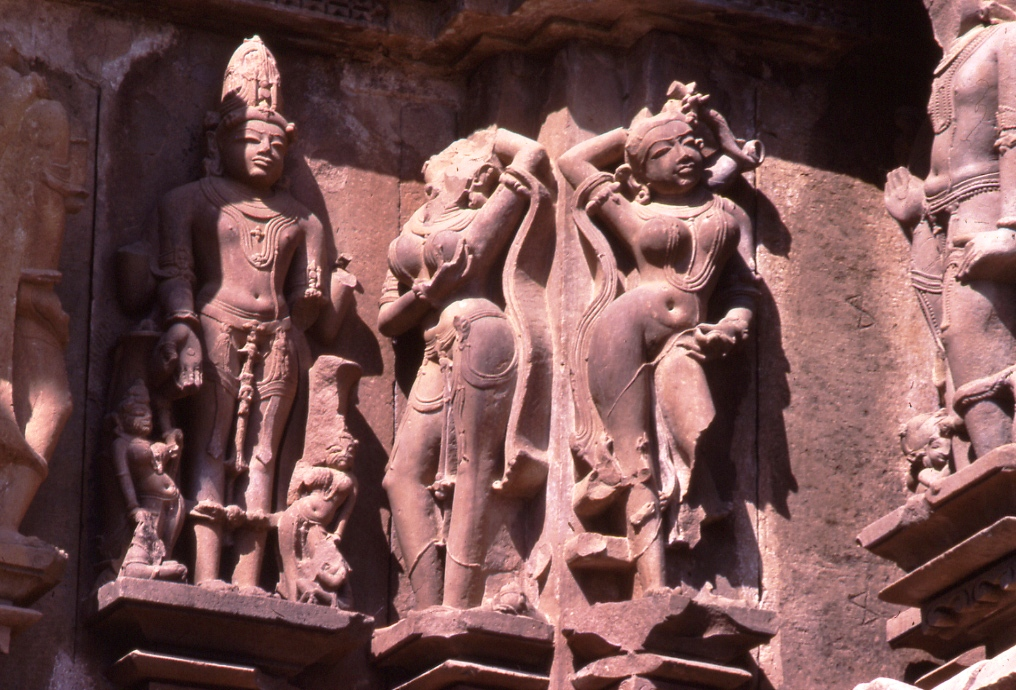
Apsara (right) exposes her yoni

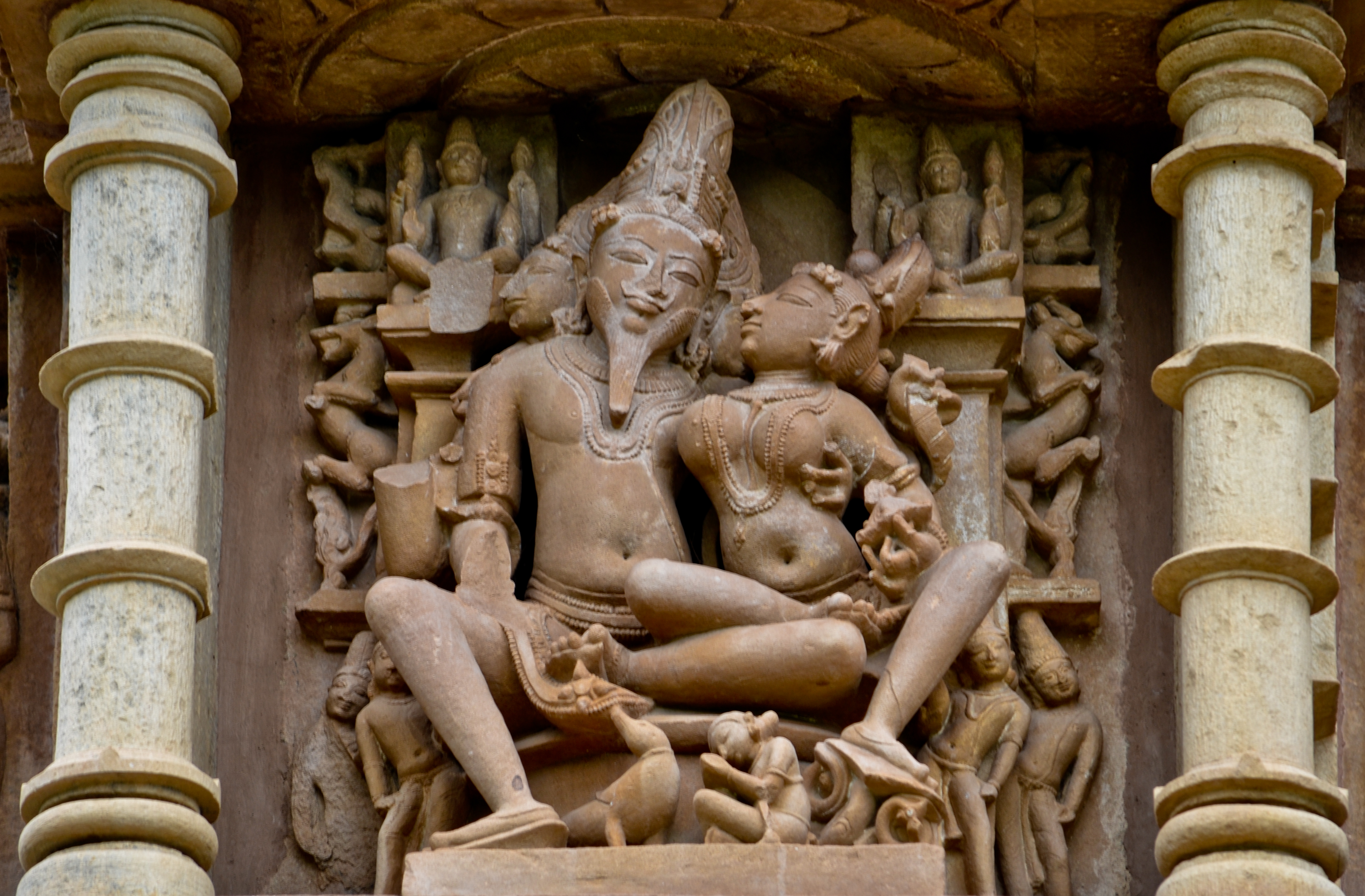
Brahma and his consort

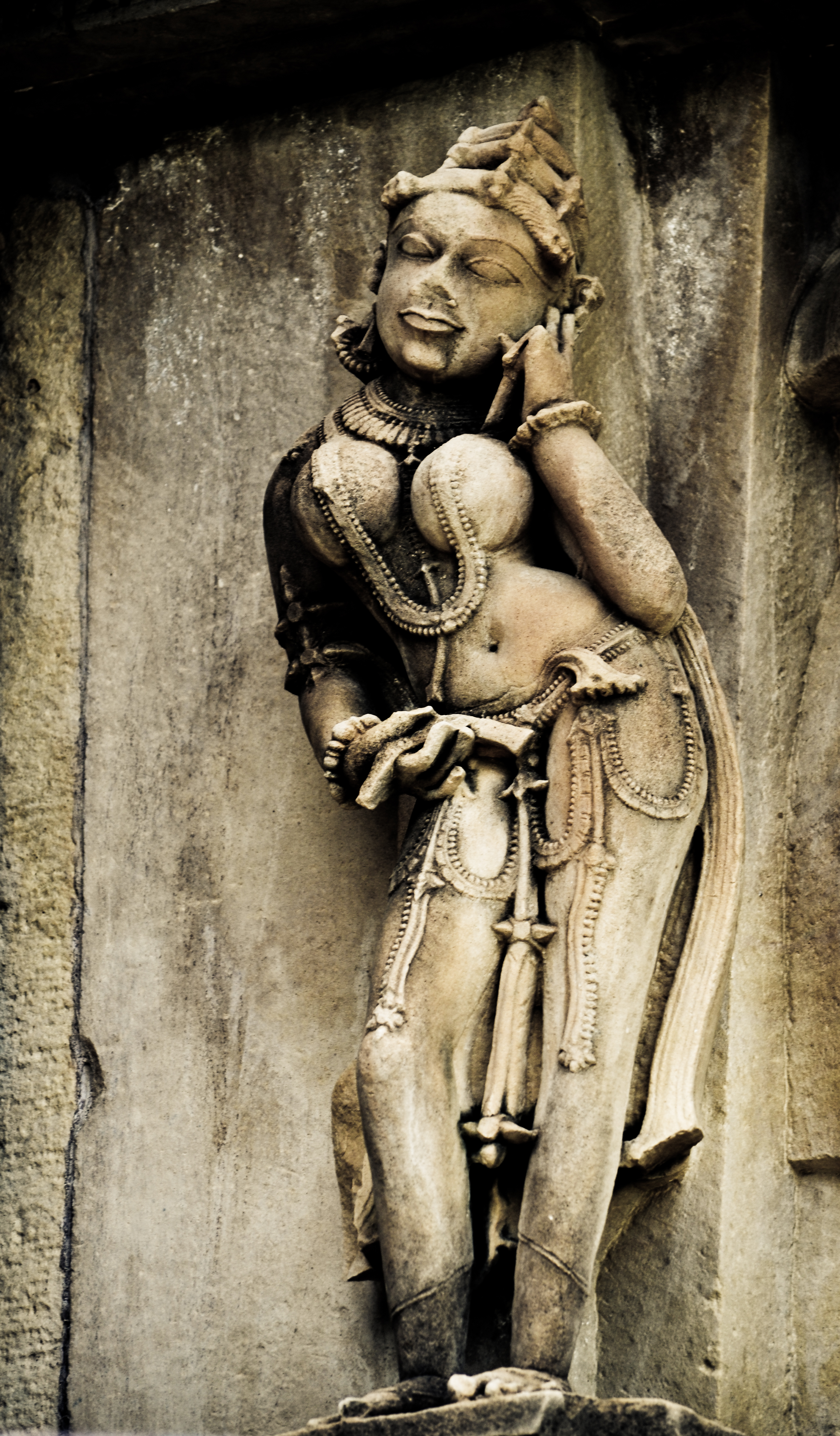
Surasundari
