= Nagara Style =

Hindu architectural style

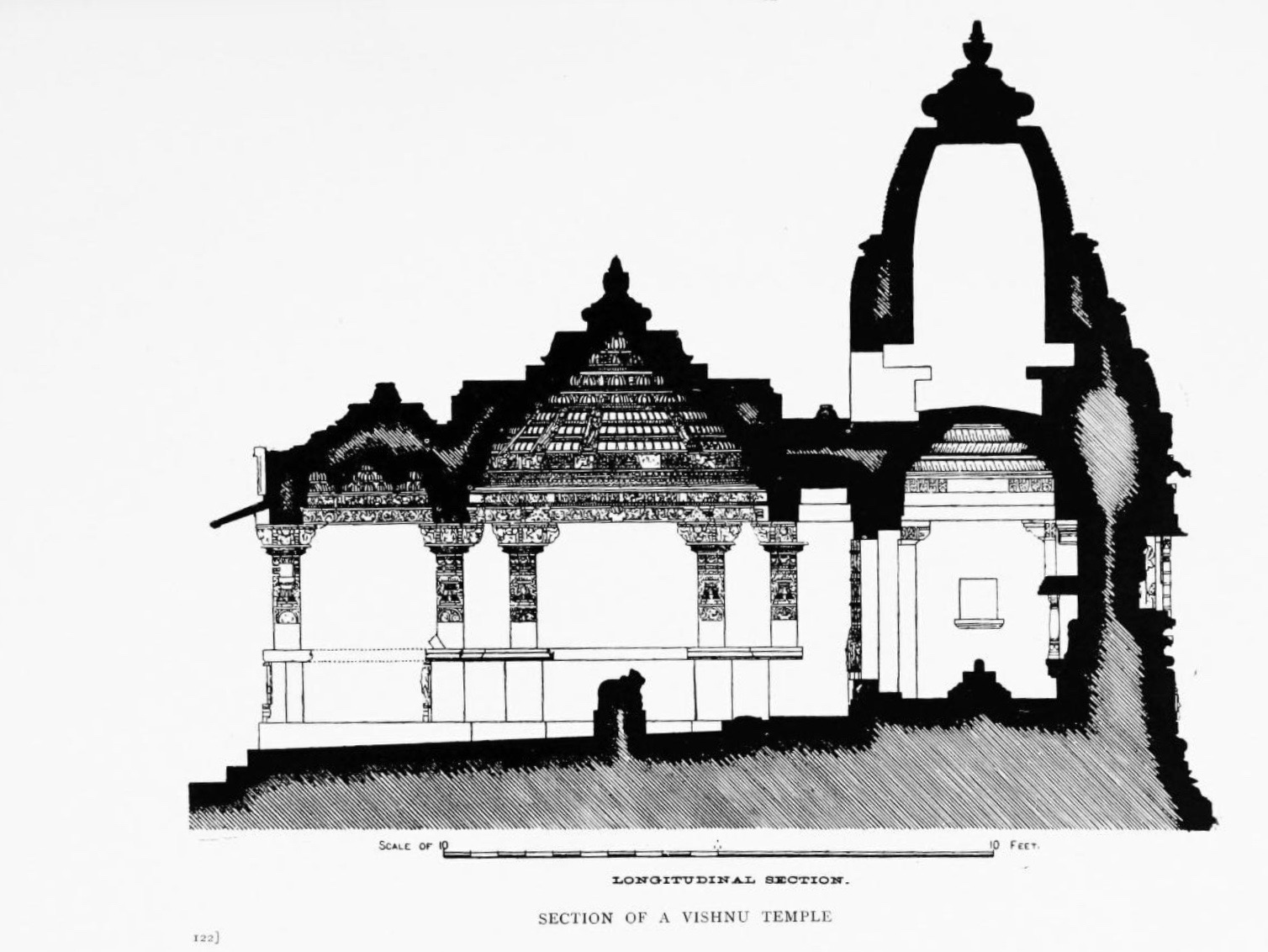
Design of a Vishnu Temple belonging to the Nagara Style, drawn in 1915

The Nagara Style or Nagara architectural style is a Hindu style of temple architecture, which is popular in Northern, Central, Western and Eastern India, especially in the regions around Malwa, Rajputana and Kalinga. Temples classified as Nagara Style are found in Madhya Pradesh, Uttar Pradesh, Rajasthan, Uttarakhand, Himachal Pradesh, Gujarat, Odisha, Jharkhand, Bihar, Maharashtra, Andhra Pradesh (areas bordering Odisha) and West Bengal (southwest and Sundarbans areas).

In the fifth century, the use of simple curved Shikhara (spires) began in temples; the earliest such temples being classified as Early Nagara Style. The Early Nagara Style was transformed into the Mainstream Nagara Style in the seventh century.

This architectural style is one of the two main styles of Hindu temple architecture, the other being the Dravidian architectural style. The Nagara style has three sub-styles or schools, which differ slightly from each other. The sub-styles or schools are Orissa school, Chandel school and Solanki school.

Developed in North India, this style of temple is built on a simple stone platform. One or more Sikharas are observed in temples, but the earliest temples consist of only one Sikhara. The garbhagriha is always located directly below the highest Sikhara. Also, the Nagara Style is characterized by the absence of boundary walls, which are widely used in the Dravidian architectural style of Hindu temple architecture. Some temple complexes and individual structures in the Nagara Style are listed as UNESCO World Heritage Sites. (Note: The Khajuraho temple complex, and the Konark Sun Temple and Mahabodhi Temple built in Nagara Style, which are recognized as UNESCO World Heritage Sites.)

== History ==
=== Origin and formative stage ===
The Nagara temple style evolved from the Gupta structural temples. From about the 5th century onwards, the development of Nagara temple style began, which passed through three formative stages until reaching its present form.

== Schools of Nagara Style ==
Nagara architectural style are observed in northern, western and eastern parts of India. Since its origin, this style has gone through various changes to its form. Variations within the style have developed over time from region to region, which have come to be recognized as sub-styles. Nagara architectural style has three sub-styles, namely Chandel, Solanki and Odisha.

=== Chandela School ===
The Chandela School or Chandela sub-style of temple construction originated in Central India. It was developed by the Chandel dynasty, the rulers of the Bundelkhand region (then called Jejakabhukti).This school or sub-style of temple construction is also known as Khajuraho School or sub-style. Temples built in this style have intricate carvings, which adorn the inner and outer walls. The sculptures in the temple are known for sensual themes, which were inspired by Vatsyayana's Kama Sutra. Sandstone is mainly used in the construction of such temples.

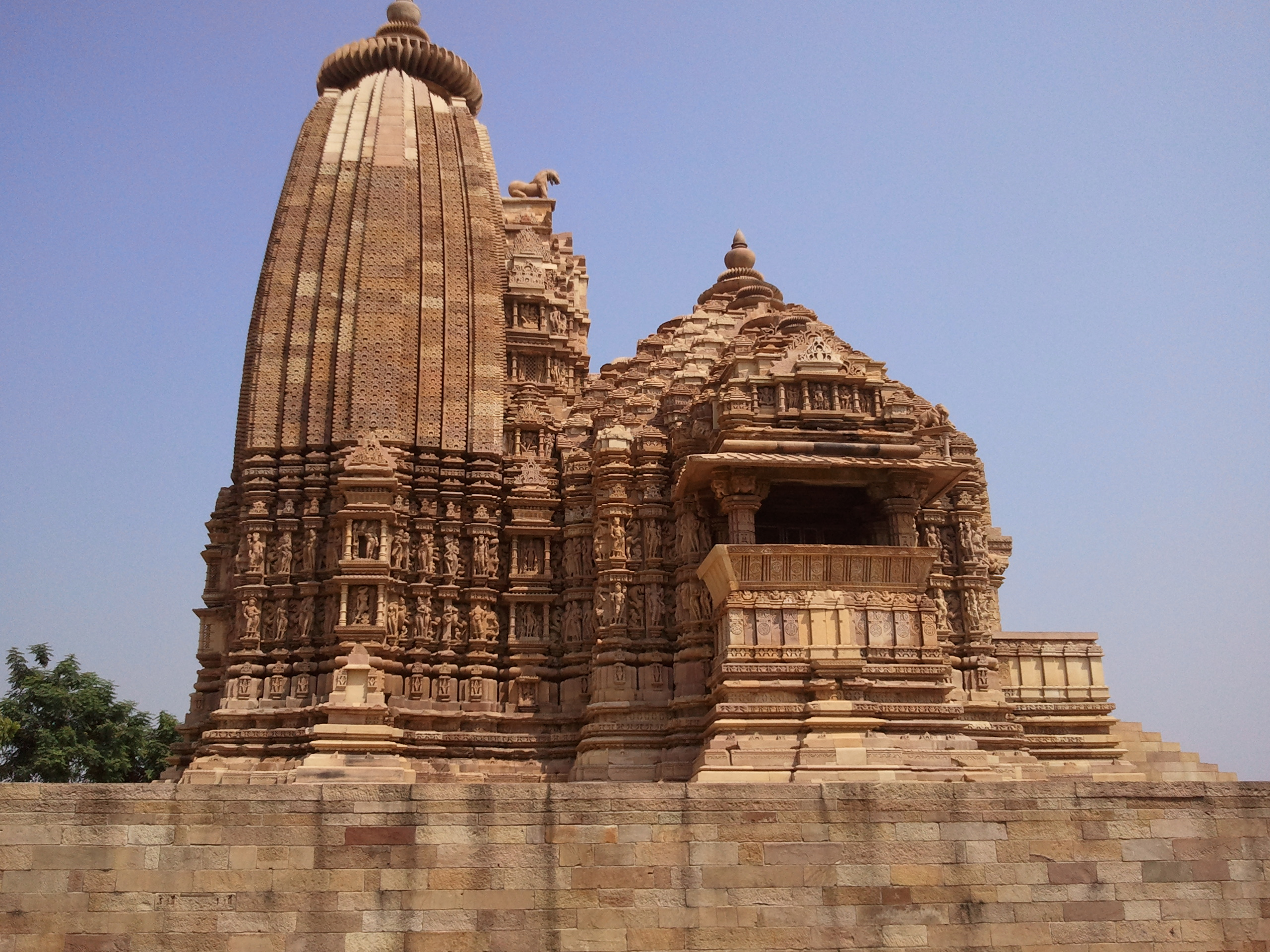
Vamana Temple

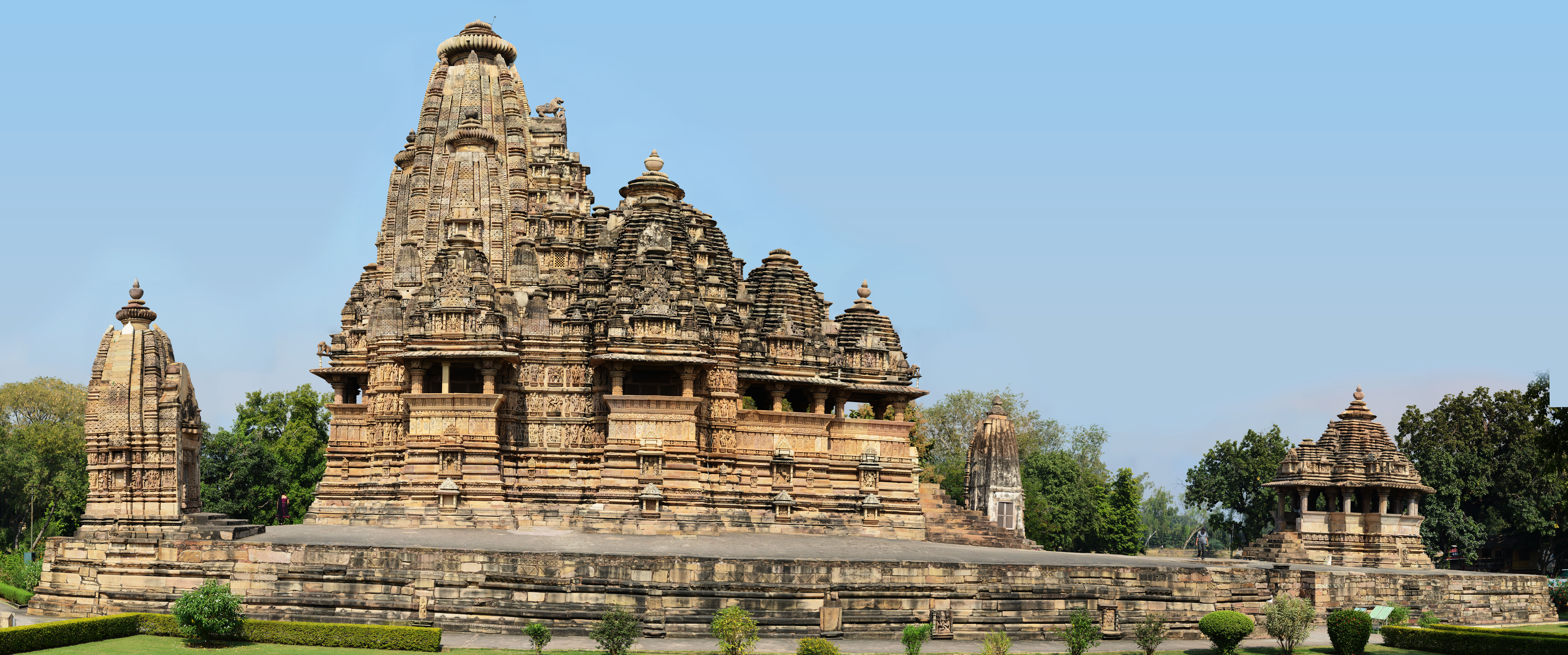
Vishwanath temple

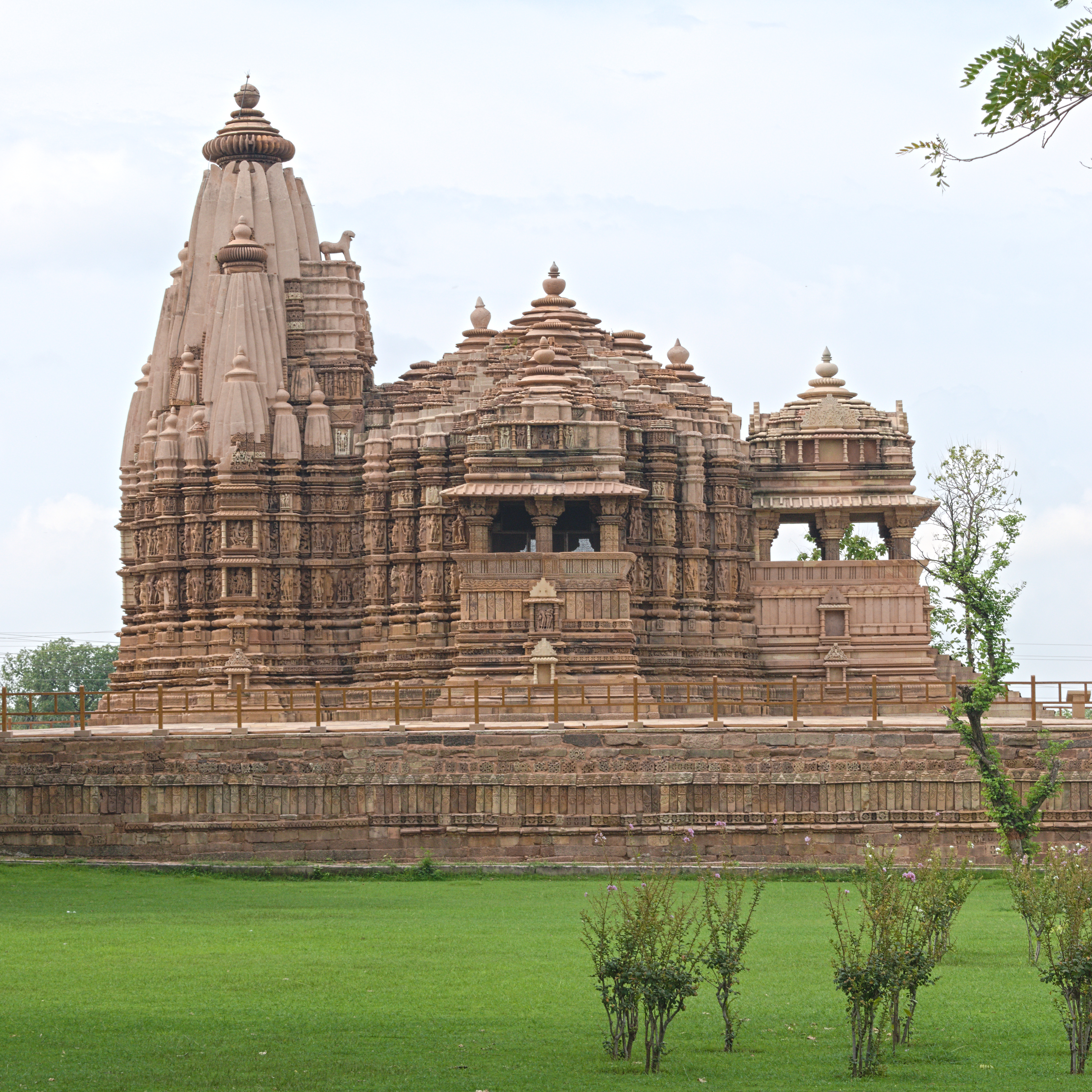
Chitragupta temple

=== Solanki school ===
The Solanki school or sub-style originated in Northwest India, particularly in the present-day Indian states of Gujarat and Rajasthan. As this sub-style expanded and developed, the Solanki kings provided support and encouragement. The walls of temples built in the Solanki sub-style are without sculptures. Internally and externally the garbhagriha and mandapa are interconnected. A terraced water tank, known as Surya Kund, is often found next to temples of this sub-style. This sub-style has also come to be known as the Māru-Gurjara school or sub-style since the 20th century.

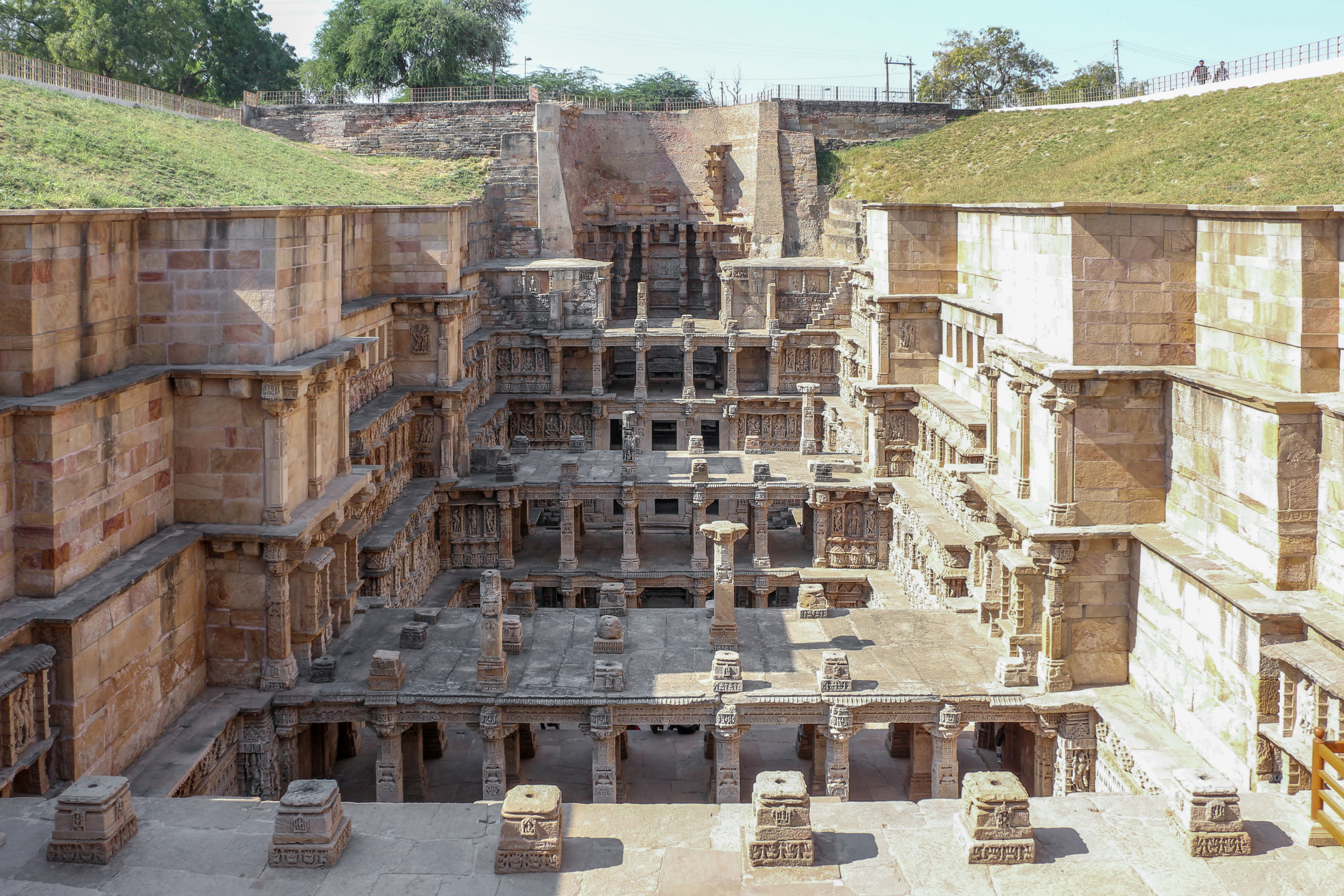
Rani Ki Vav, Patan

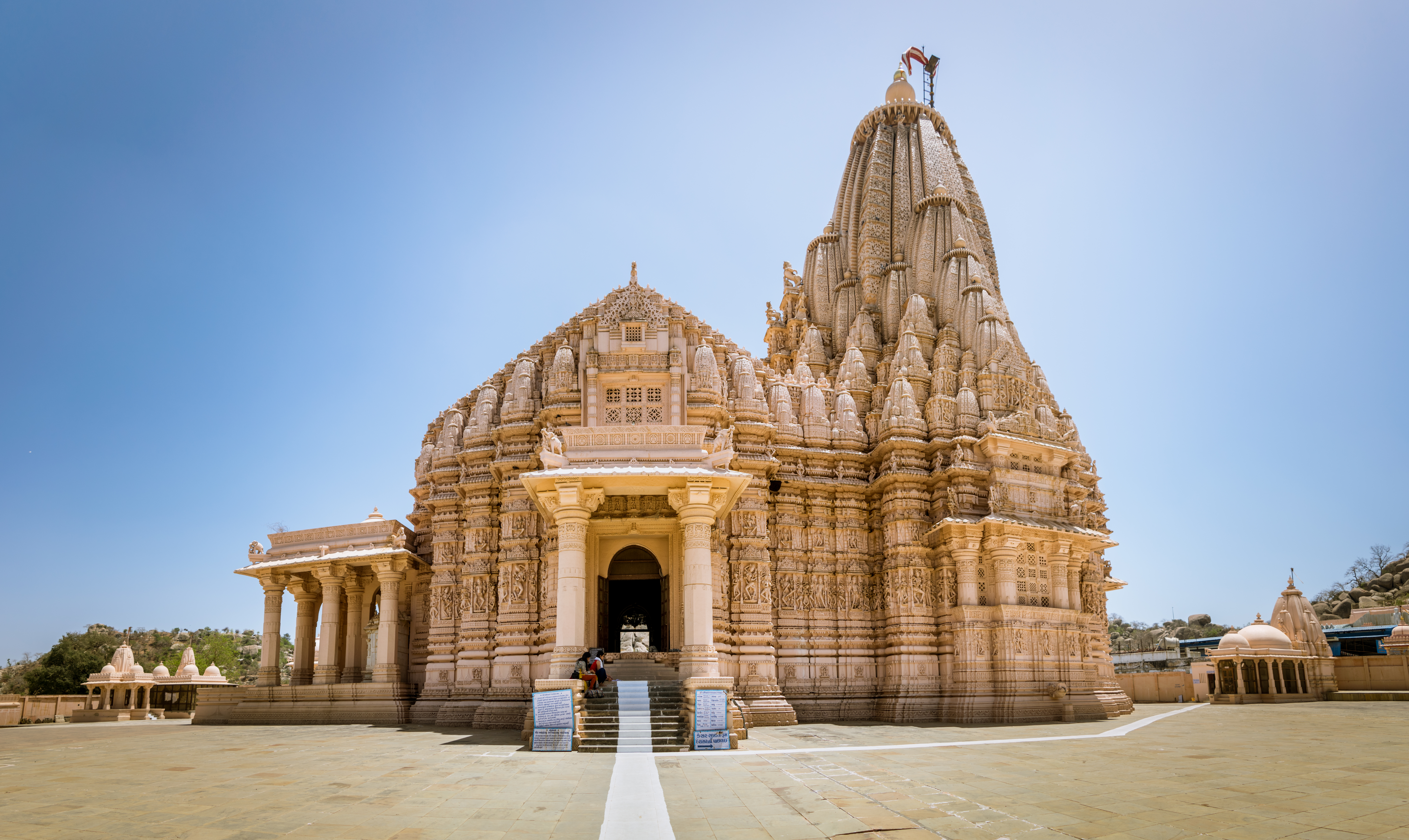
Taranga Jain temple

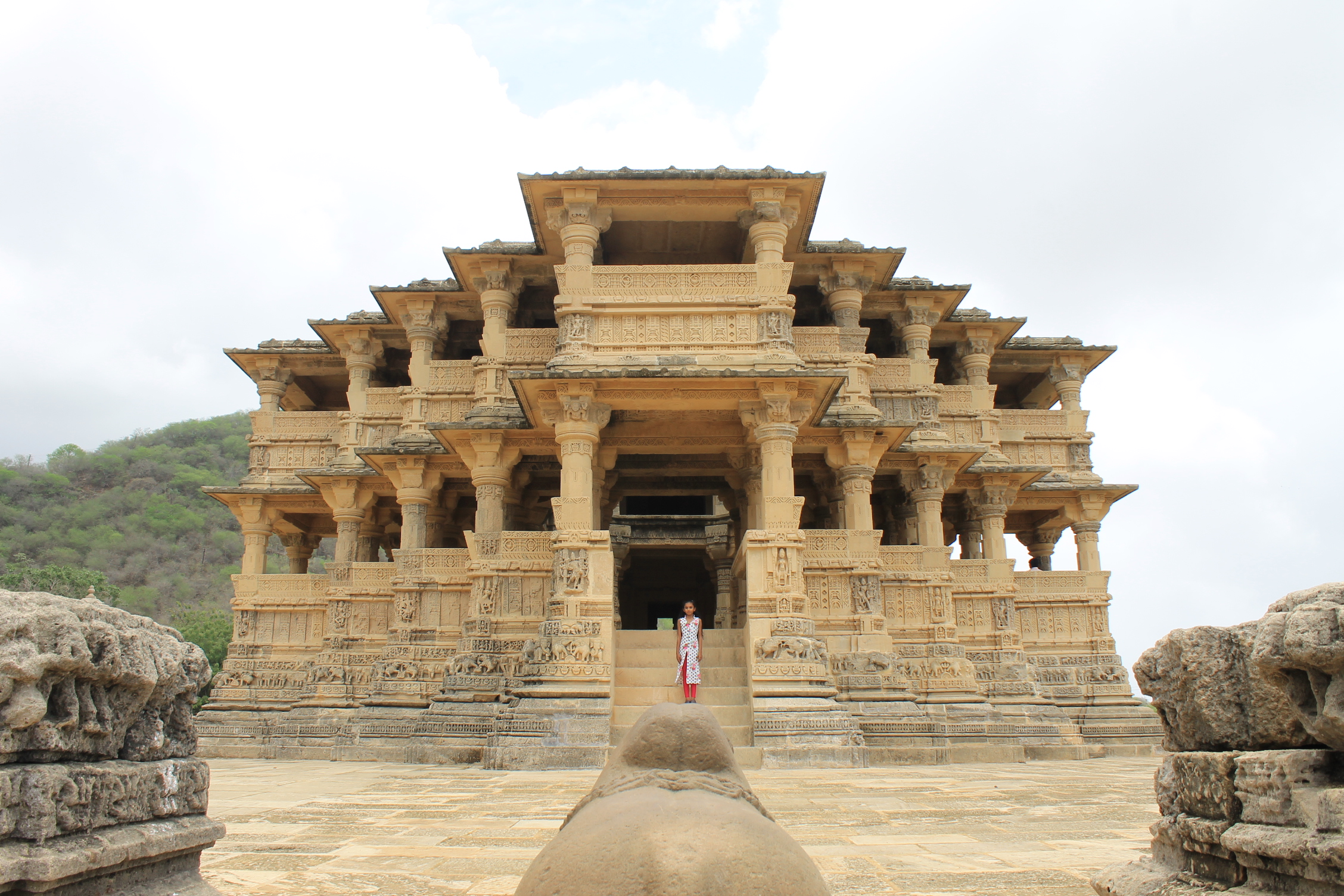
Navlakha Temple

=== Odisha School ===
The Odisha school or sub-style originated in the coastal regions of East India, especially the present Indian state of Odisha and Andhra Pradesh. This school or sub-style of temple construction is also known as Kalinga School or sub-style.

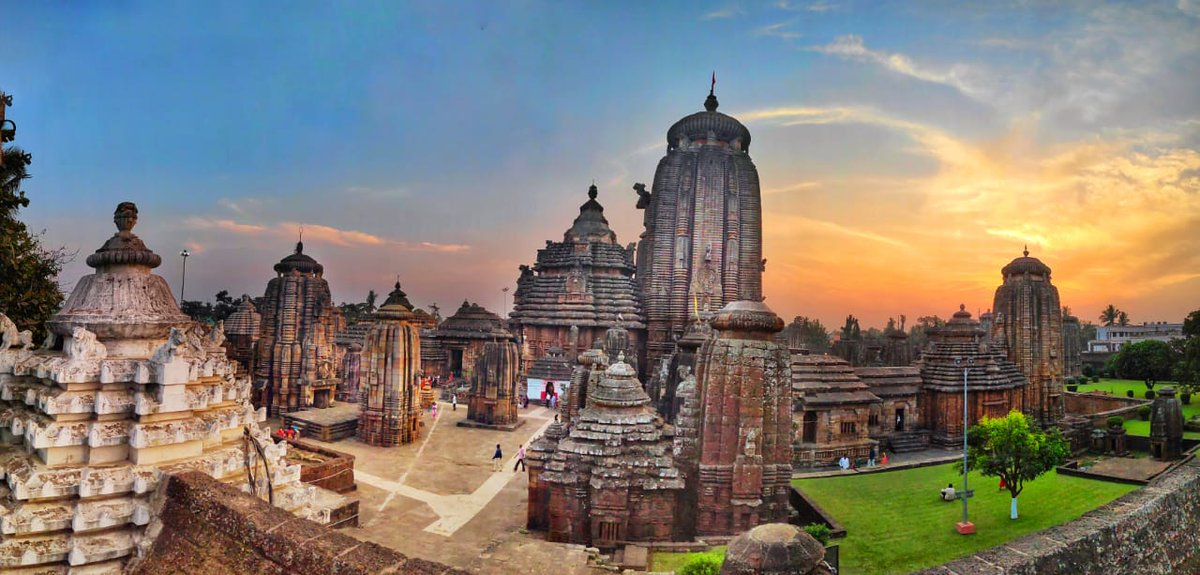
Lingaraj Temple, Bhubaneswar

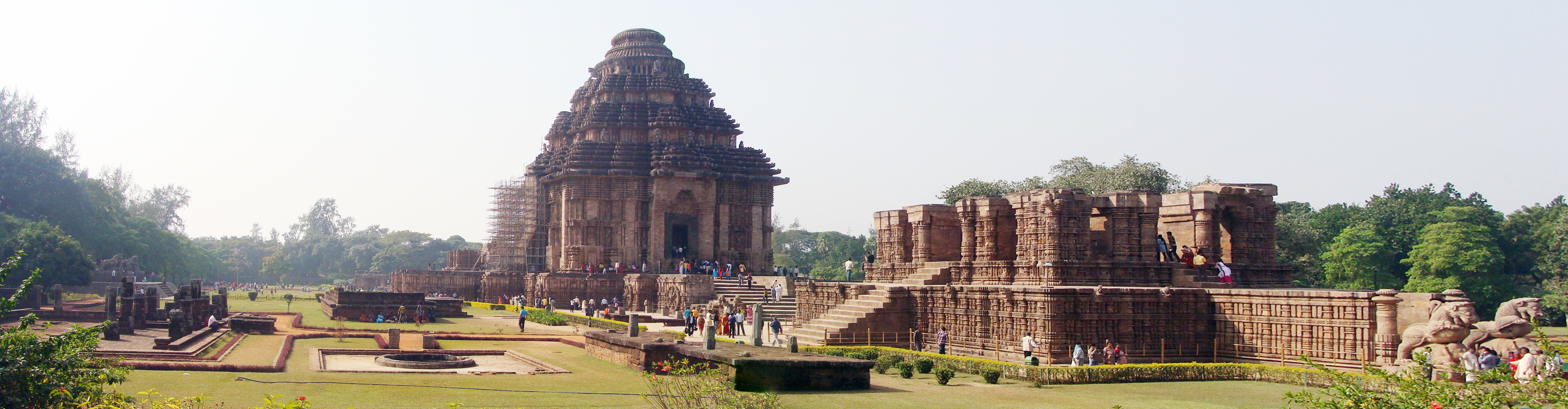
Konark Sun Temple, Konark

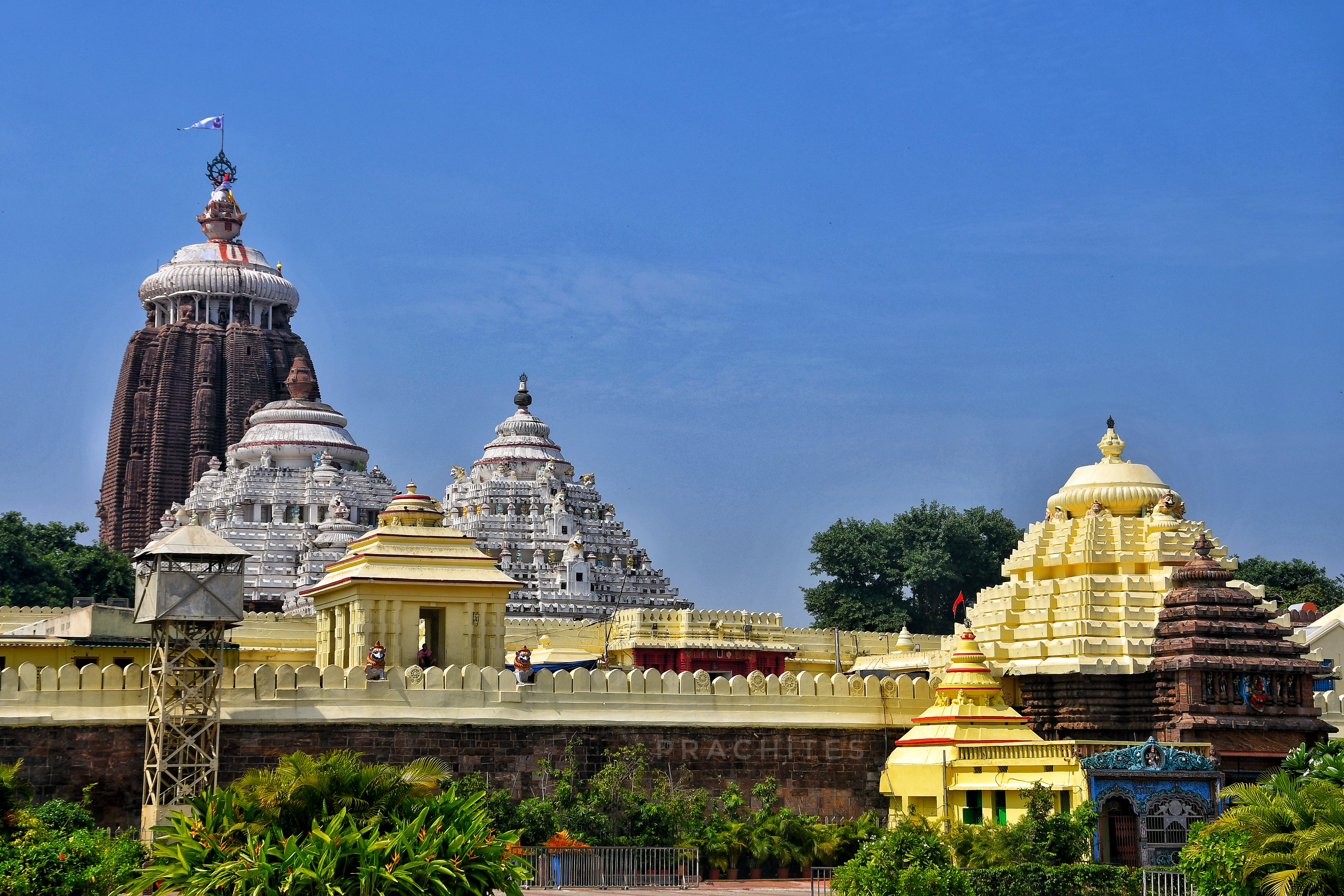
Jagannath Temple, Puri

== Bibliography ==
- Hardy, Adam (2007). The temple architecture of India. Chichester (GB): J. Wiley and sons. ISBN 978-0-470-02827-8.
- Rastogi, Twinkle (May 2023). Study of North Indian-Style or Nagara Style of Indian Architecture in the Temples of Gwalior Fort. pp. 1–14. ISBN 978-81-960067-2-3.
- Vardia, Shweta. "Building Science of IndianTemple Architecture".
- Kumar, Surender; Ashish, Dalal; Sitender, Chillar. "Building Science of Ancient Indian Temples" (PDF). International Journal of Engineering Sciences Paradigms and Researches.
- Dey, Monidipa (2022). Himachal Temple & The Bengal Connection. Gurugram, India: Garuda Prakashana Private Limited. ISBN 979-8-88575-058-5.
