= Devi Jagadambi Temple =

Temple in India

Devi Jagdambi Temple
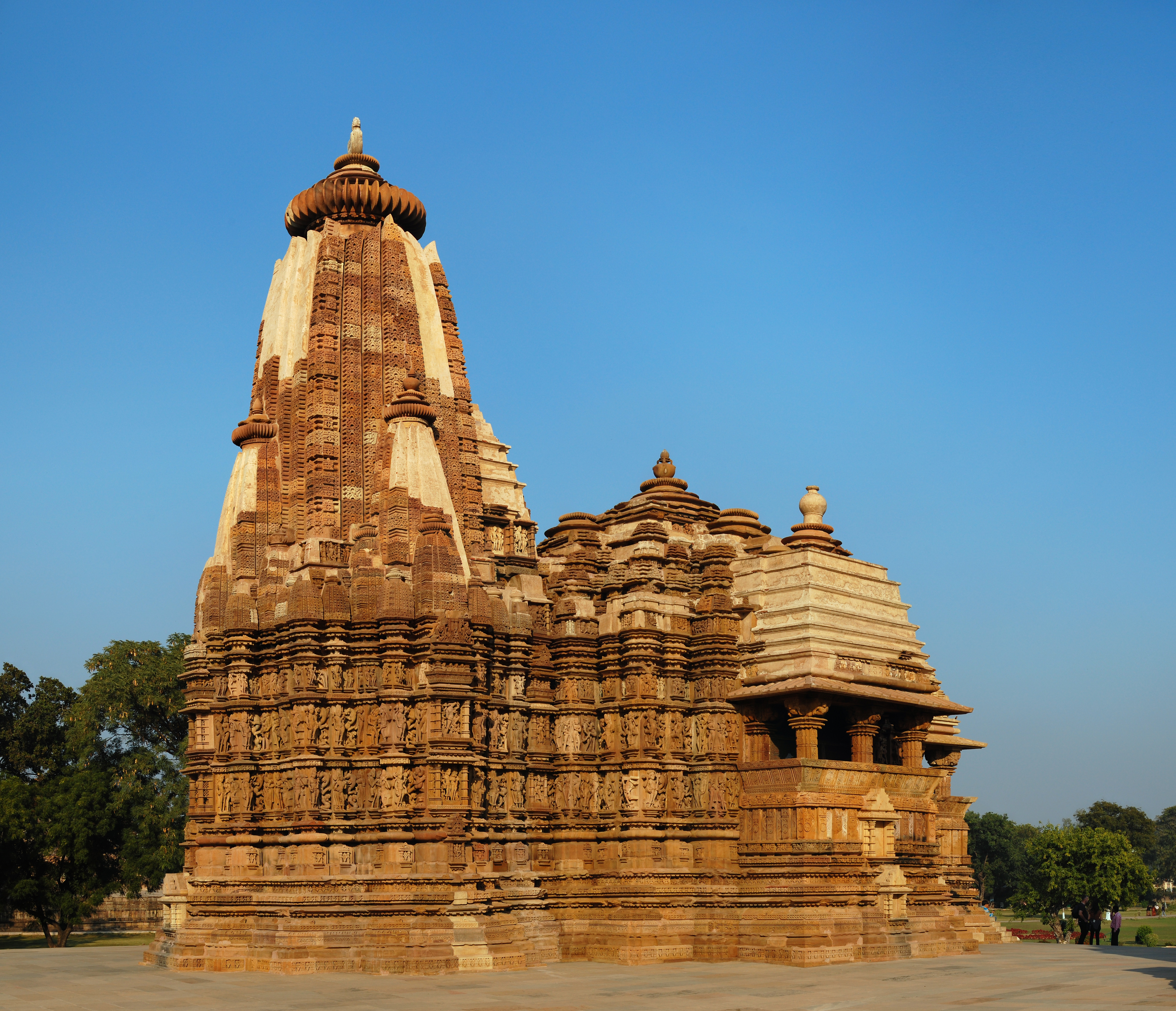
- Devi Jagdambi temple at Khajuraho

- Location in Madhya Pradesh

Religion
- Affiliation: Hinduism
- District: Chattarpur, Khajuraho
- Deity: Parvati

Location
- Location: Khajuraho
- State: Madhya Pradesh
- Country: India
- Interactive map of Devi Jagdambi Temple
- Coordinates: 24°51′12.2″N 79°55′10.8″E

Architecture
- Creator: Chandella Rulers
- Completed: Circa A.D.1000-25
- Temple: 1

Devi Jagadambika Temple or Jagadambika Temple is one of a group of about 25 temples at Khajuraho, Madhya Pradesh, India. Along with the other temples at Khajuraho, the temple was listed as a World Heritage Site because of its outstanding architecture, art, and historical importance. The temples of Khajuraho were built by the rulers of the Chandela dynasty between the 10th and the 12th centuries.

Devi Jagadambika temple, in a group to the north, is one of the most finely decorated temples at Khajuraho. It is named after Jagadambika, a Hindu goddess related to devi. Three bands of carvings encircle the body of the temple. In the sanctum is an enormous image of the Goddess (Parvati).

== History ==
The Devi Jagadambi Temple is one of the Khajuraho group of monuments that were built during the rule of the Chandela dynasty. The building activity started almost immediately after the rise of their power, throughout their kingdom to be later known as Bundelkhand. Most temples were built during the reigns of the Hindu kings Yashovarman and Dhanga. Yashovarman's legacy is best exhibited by the Lakshmana Temple. Vishvanatha temple best highlights King Dhanga's reign. The largest and currently most famous surviving temple is Kandariya Mahadeva built in the reign of King Vidyadhara. The temple inscriptions suggest many of the currently surviving temples were complete between 970 and 1030 CE, with further temples completed during the following decades.

The first documented mention of Khajuraho was made in 641 by Xuanzang, a Chinese pilgrim who described encountering several dozen inactive Buddhist monasteries and a dozen Hindu temples with a thousand worshipping brahmins. In 1022 CE, Khajuraho was mentioned by Abu Rihan-al-Biruni, the Persian historian who accompanied Mahmud of Ghazni in his raid of Kalinjar; he mentions Khajuraho as the capital of Jajahuti. The raid was unsuccessful, and a peace accord was reached when the Hindu king agreed to pay a ransom to Mahmud of Ghazni to end the attack and leave.

Khajuraho temples were in active use through the end of the 12th century. This changed in the 13th century; after the army of Delhi Sultanate, under the command of the Muslim Sultan Qutb-ud-din Aibak, attacked and seized the Chandela kingdom. About a century later, Ibn Battuta, the Moroccan traveller in his memoirs about his stay in India from 1335 to 1342 CE, mentioned visiting Khajuraho temples, calling them "Kajarra" as follows:

...near (Khajuraho) temples, which contain idols that have been mutilated by the Moslems, live a number of yogis whose matted locks have grown as long as their bodies. And on account of extreme asceticism they are all yellow in colour. Many Moslems attend these men in order to take lessons (yoga) from them.

— Ibn Battuta, about 1335 CE, Riḥlat Ibn Baṭūṭah, Translated by Arthur Cotterell

The central Indian region, where Khajuraho temples are, was controlled by various Muslim dynasties from the 13th century through the 18th century. In this period, some temples were desecrated, followed by a long period when they were left in neglect. In 1495 CE, for example, Sikandar Lodi's campaign of temple destruction included Khajuraho. The remoteness and isolation of Khajuraho protected the Hindu and Jain temples from continued destruction by Muslims. Over the centuries, vegetation and forests overgrew the temples.

In the 1830s, local Hindus guided a British surveyor, T.S. Burt, to the temples and they were thus rediscovered by the global audience. Alexander Cunningham later reported, few years after the rediscovery, that the temples were secretly in use by yogis and thousands of Hindus would arrive for pilgrimage during Shivaratri celebrated annually in February or March based on a lunar calendar. In 1852, F.C. Maisey prepared earliest drawings of the Khajuraho temples.

== Festivals ==
Some festivals celebrated at the temple are as follows:

- The Khajuraho dance festival
- Navaratri
- Durga Puja
- Ram Navami
- Dussehra

== Sources ==
- Devangana Desai (2005). Khajuraho (Sixth impression ed.). Oxford University Press. ISBN 978-0-19-565391-5.
