= Lakshmana Temple, Khajuraho =

Hindu temple in Khajuraho, India

Lakshmana Temple
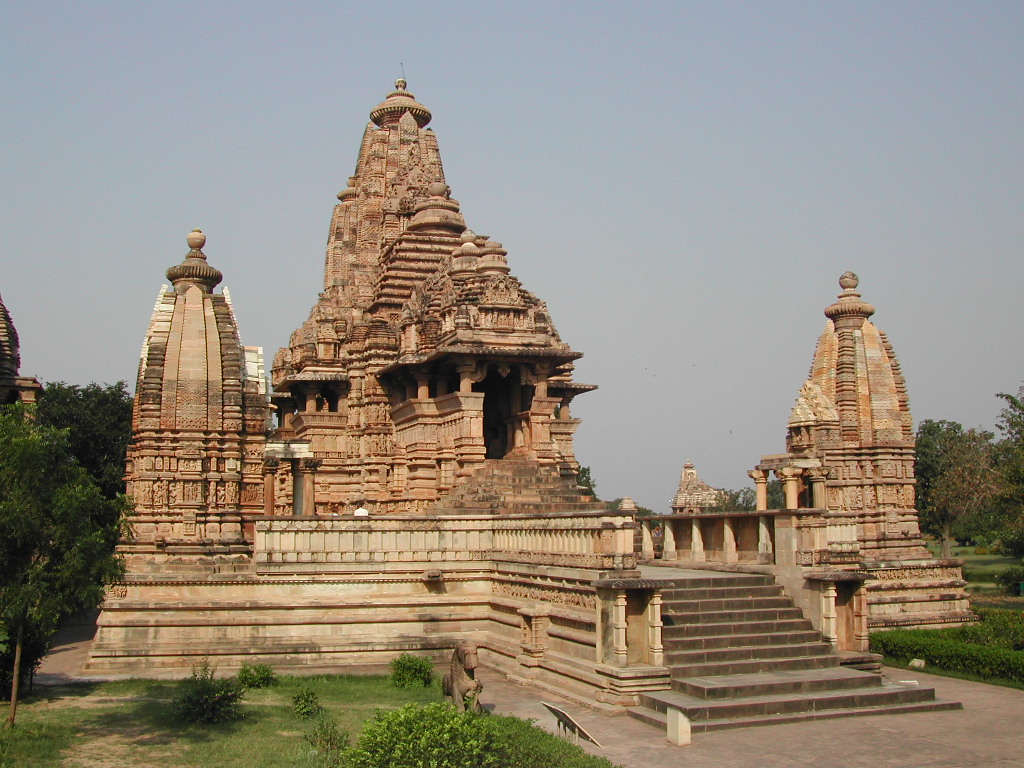
- Lakshmana temple at Khajuraho

- Location in Madhya Pradesh Lakshmana Temple, Khajuraho (India)

Religion
- Affiliation: Hinduism
- District: Chattarpur, Khajuraho
- Deity: Vaikuntha Vishnu

Location
- Location: Khajuraho
- State: Madhya Pradesh
- Country: India
- Interactive map of Lakshmana Temple
- Coordinates: 24°51′7.7″N 79°55′18.1″E

Architecture
- Creator: Yashovarman, (Chandella Ruler)
- Completed: c. 930 – c. 950 CE
- Temple: 1 (+4 small temples on corners)

The Lakshmana Temple is a 10th-century Hindu temple built by Yashovarman during the Chandela dynasty located in Khajuraho, India. It is dedicated to Vaikuntha Vishnu - an aspect of Vishnu. As part of the Khajuraho Group of Monuments, and owing to its architecture and religious importance, the temple was inscribed on the UNESCO World Heritage List in 1986.

== Location ==
This temple is located in the Western Temple complex in Khajuraho. Khajuraho is a small village in the Chhatarpur District of Madhya Pradesh, India.

== Architecture ==
It is a Sandhara Temple of the Panchayatana Variety. The entire temple complex stands on a high platform (Jagati), as seen in image. The structure consists of all the elements of Hindu temple architecture. It has entrance porch (ardh-mandapa), Mandapa, Maha-Mandapa, Antarala and Garbhagriha.

Unlike other temples in Khajuraho, its sanctum is Pancharatha on plan (top-view). Its shikhara is clustered with minor urushringas (refer images of temple top i.e. shikhara).

The wall portion is studded with balconied windows with ornate balustrades. It has two rows of sculptures (refer images of temple's outer wall) including divine figures, couples and erotic scenes. The sanctum doorway is of seven sakhas (vertical panels). The central one being decorated with the ten incarnation of Vishnu. The Lintel depicts goddess Lakshmi in the centre flanked by Brahma and Vishnu. The sanctum contains four-armed sculpture of Vishnu. One of the niches has the image of the sculptor and his disciples at work.

== Sculptures ==
=== Main idol ===
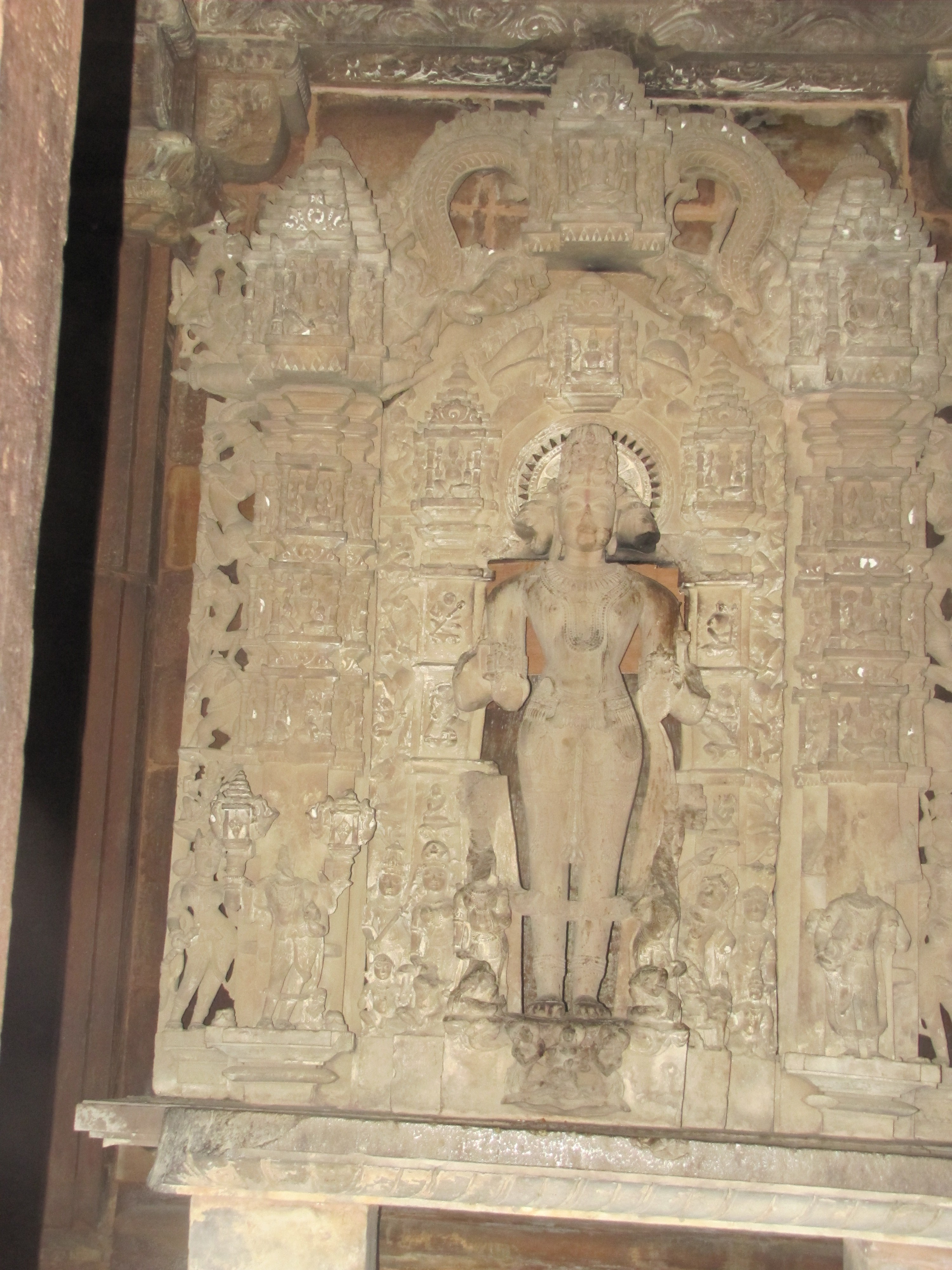
Main Idol (Tri-Headed Vishnu), Lakshman Temple, Khajuraho India

Main image is of three-headed & four-armed sculpture of Vaikuntha Vishnu.

The central head is of human, and two sides of boar (depicting Varaha) and lion (depicting Narashima).

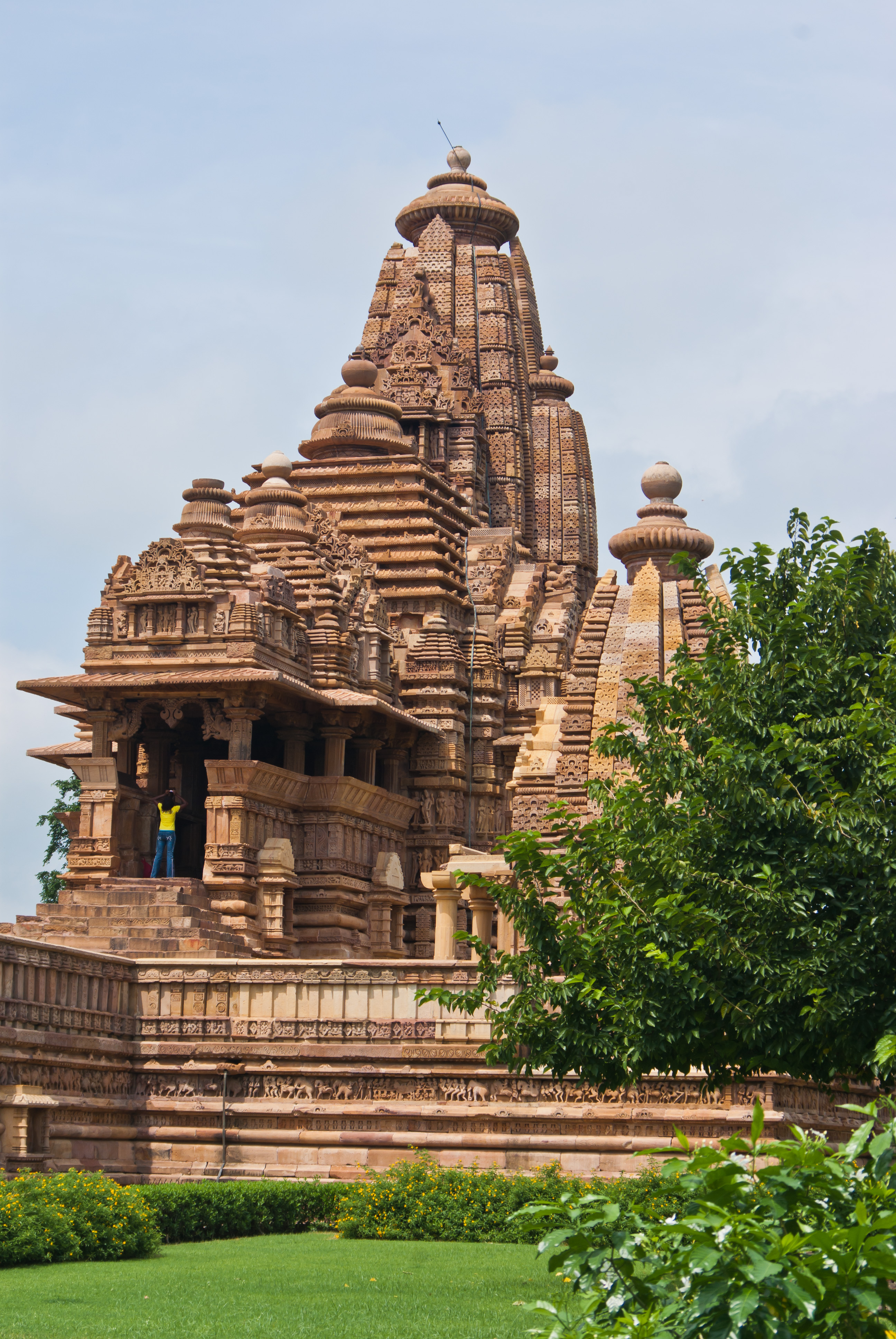

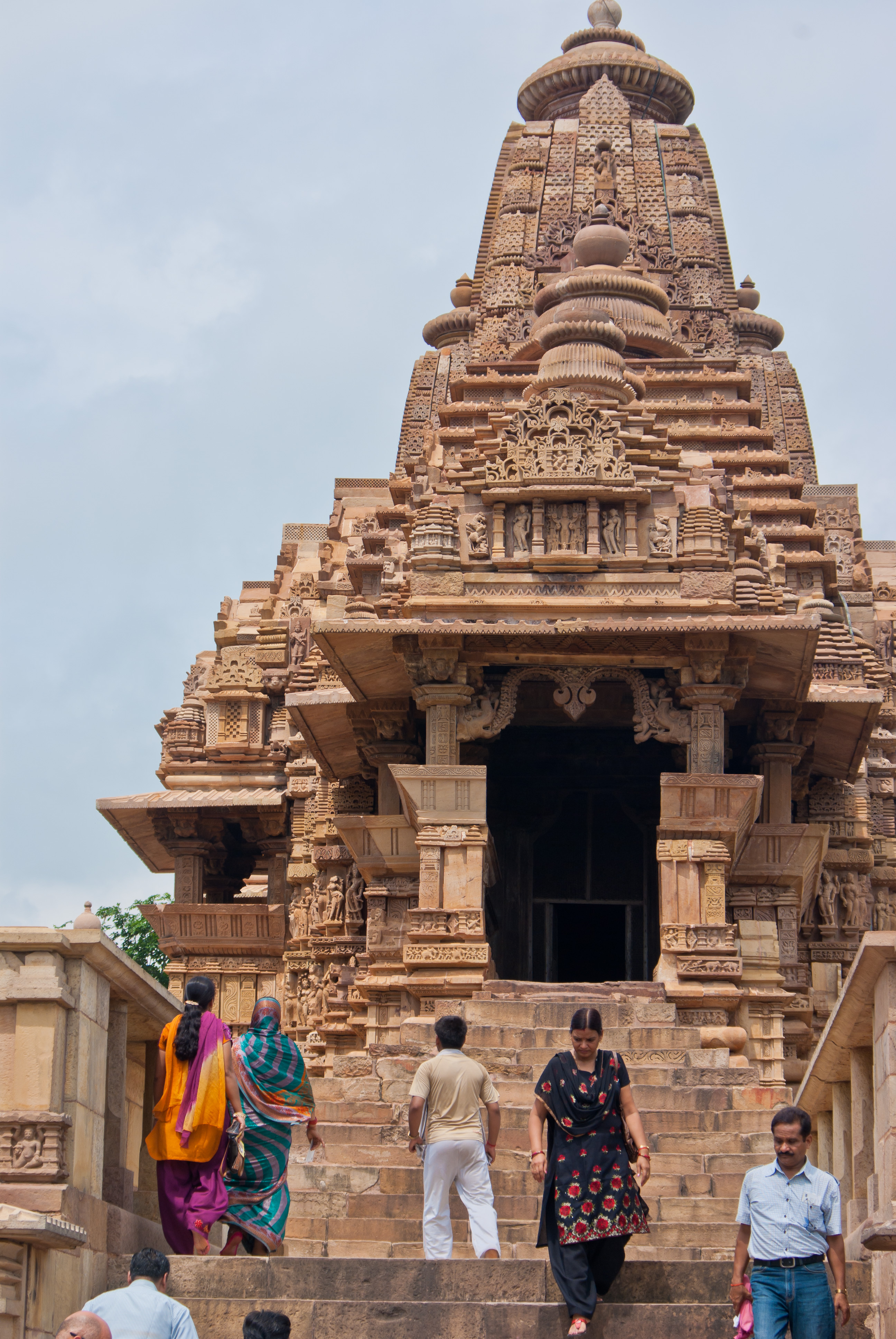

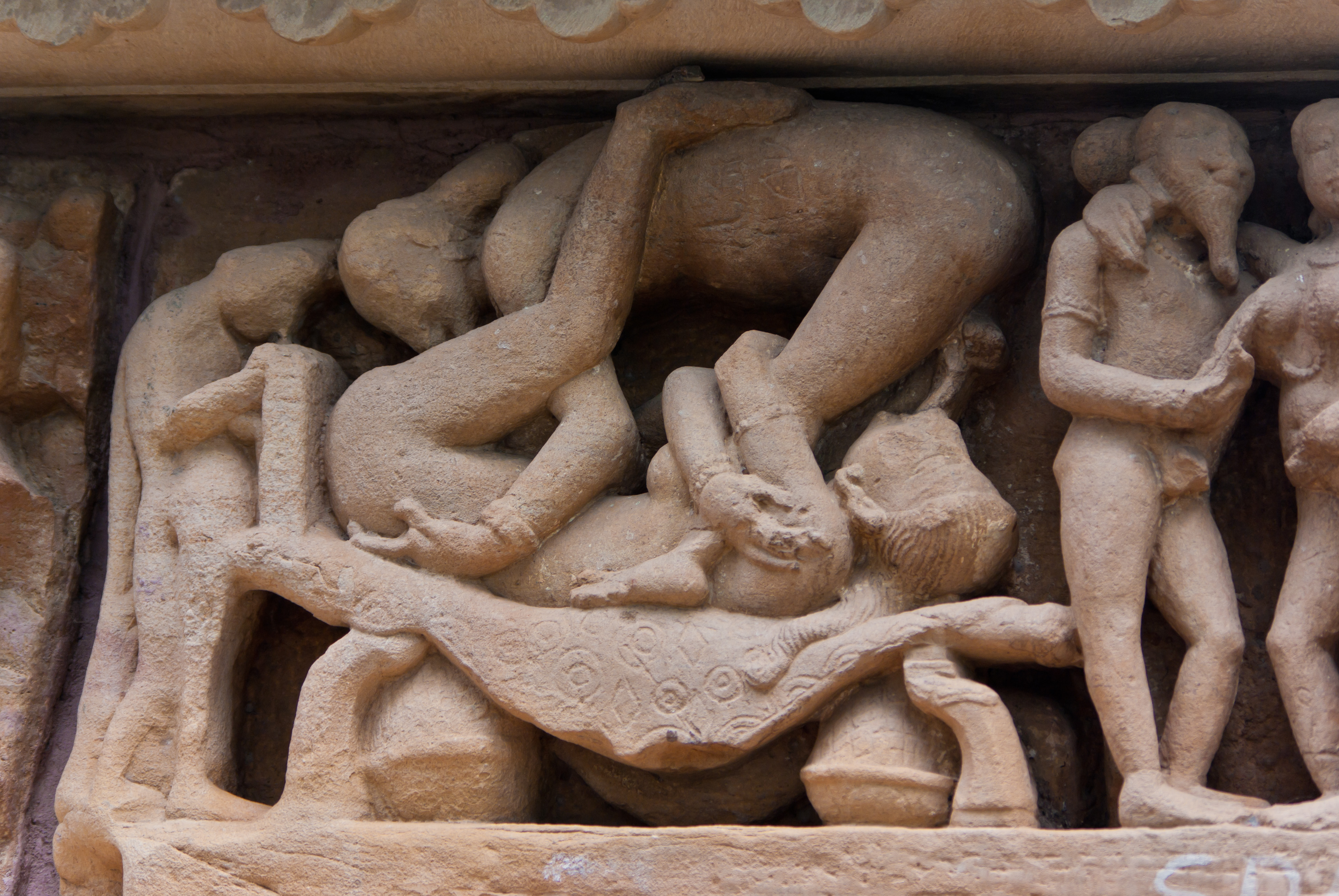

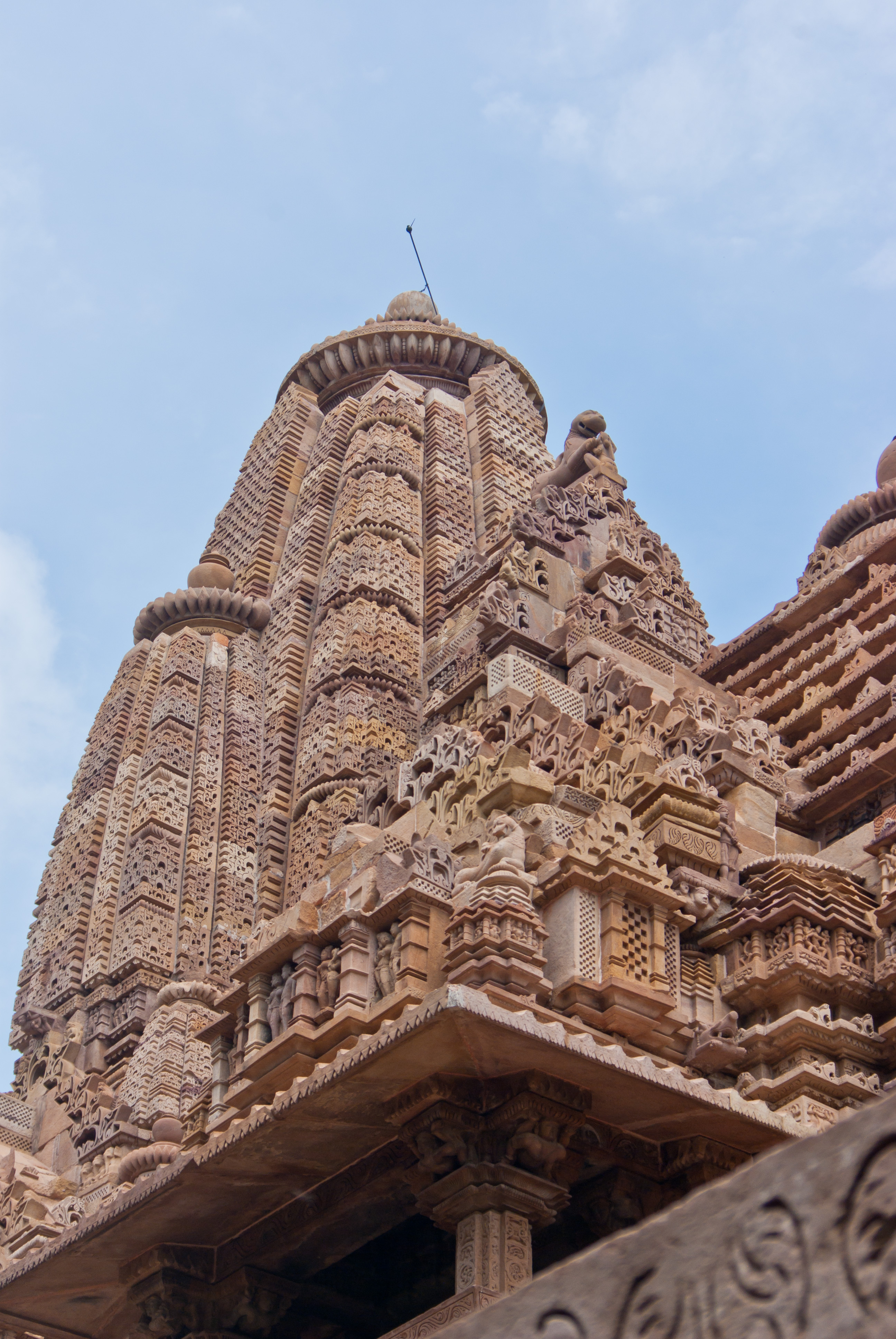

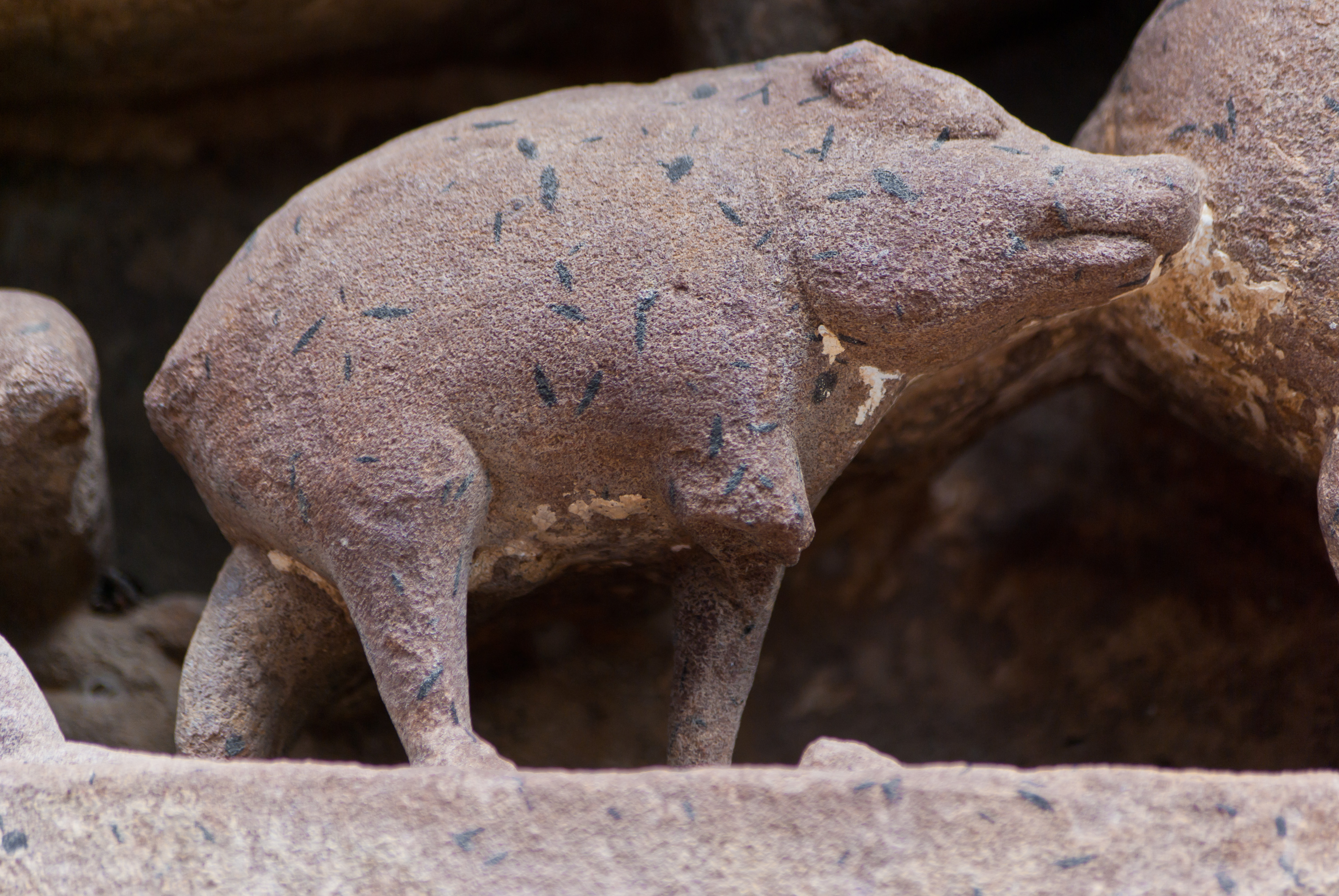

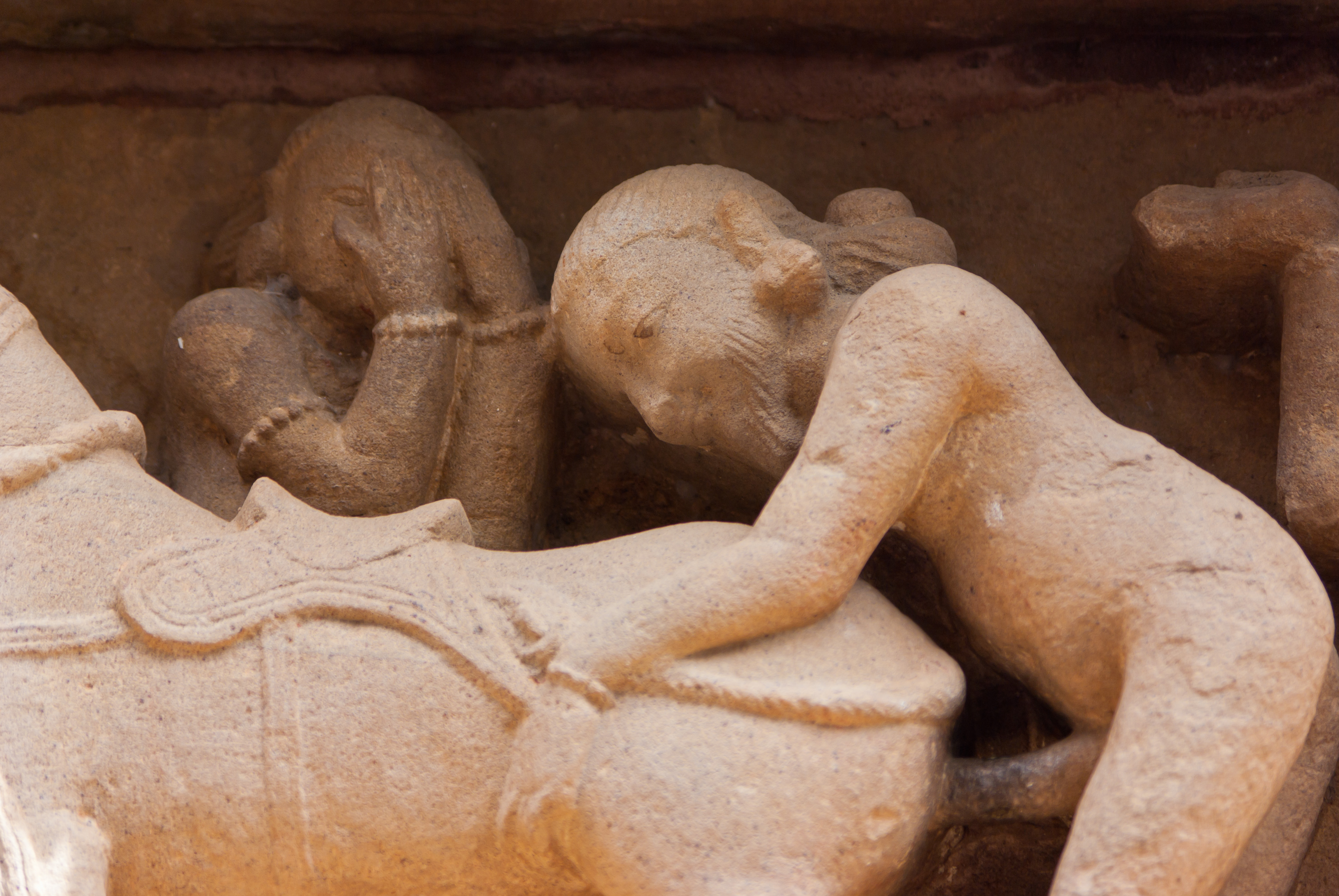

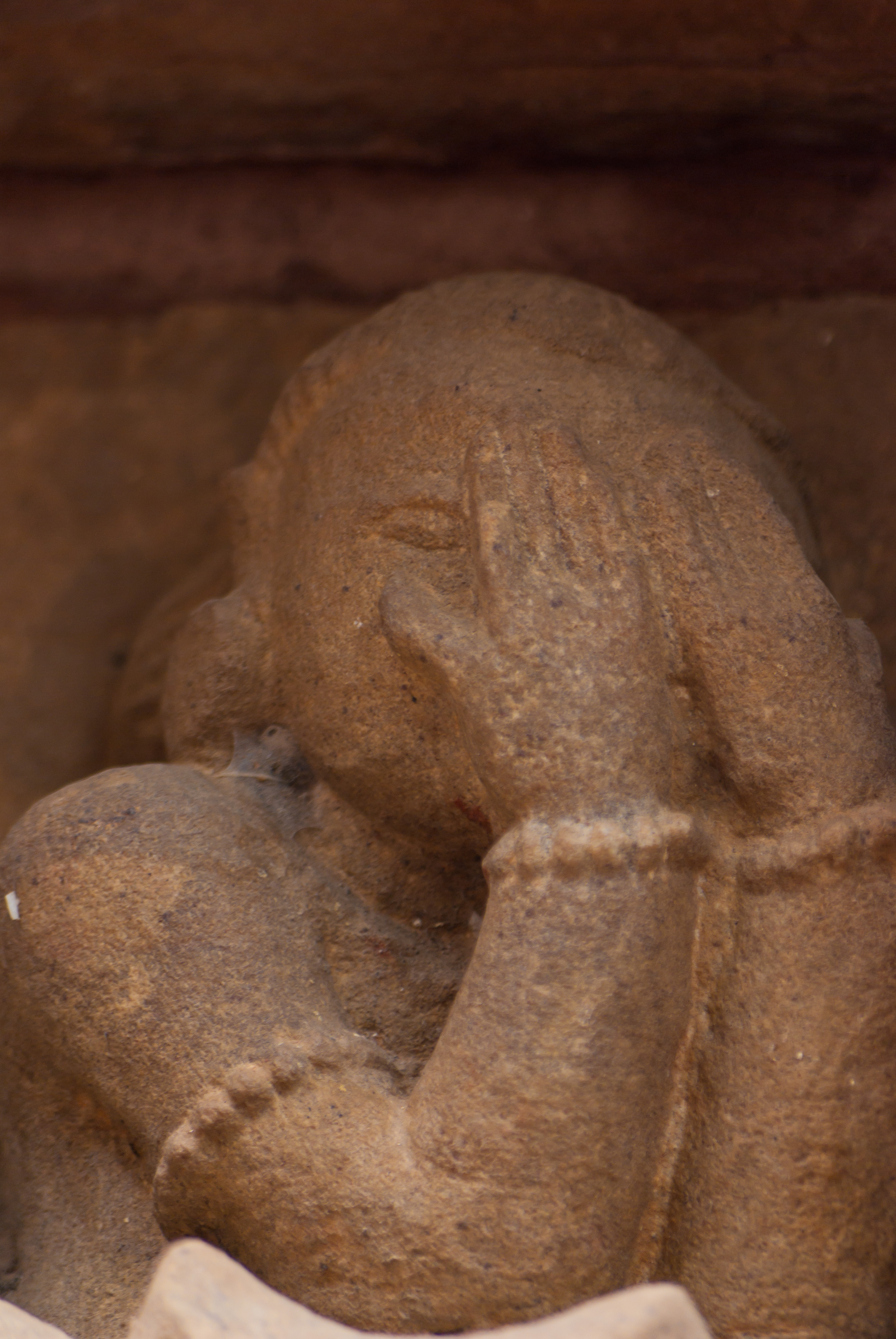

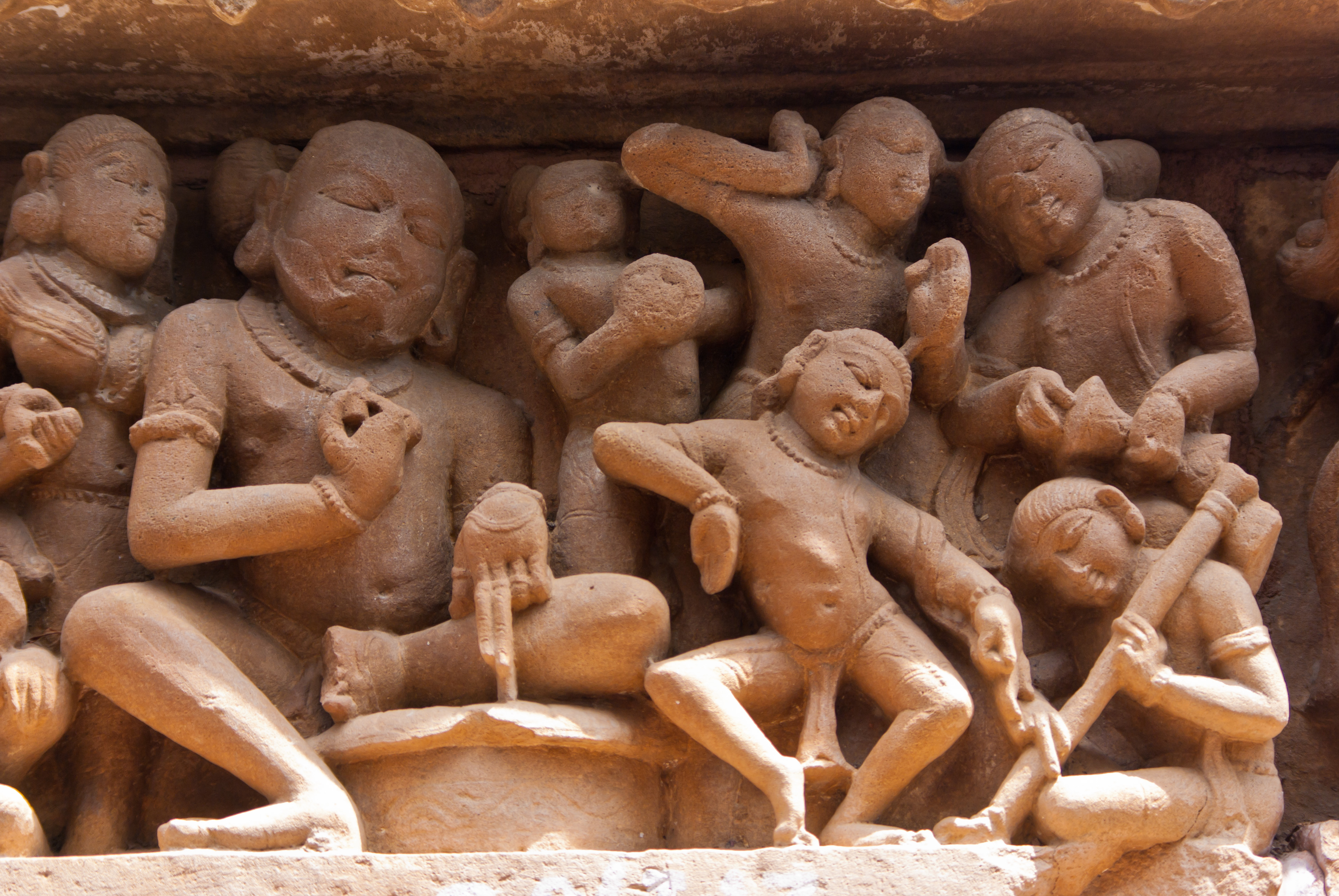

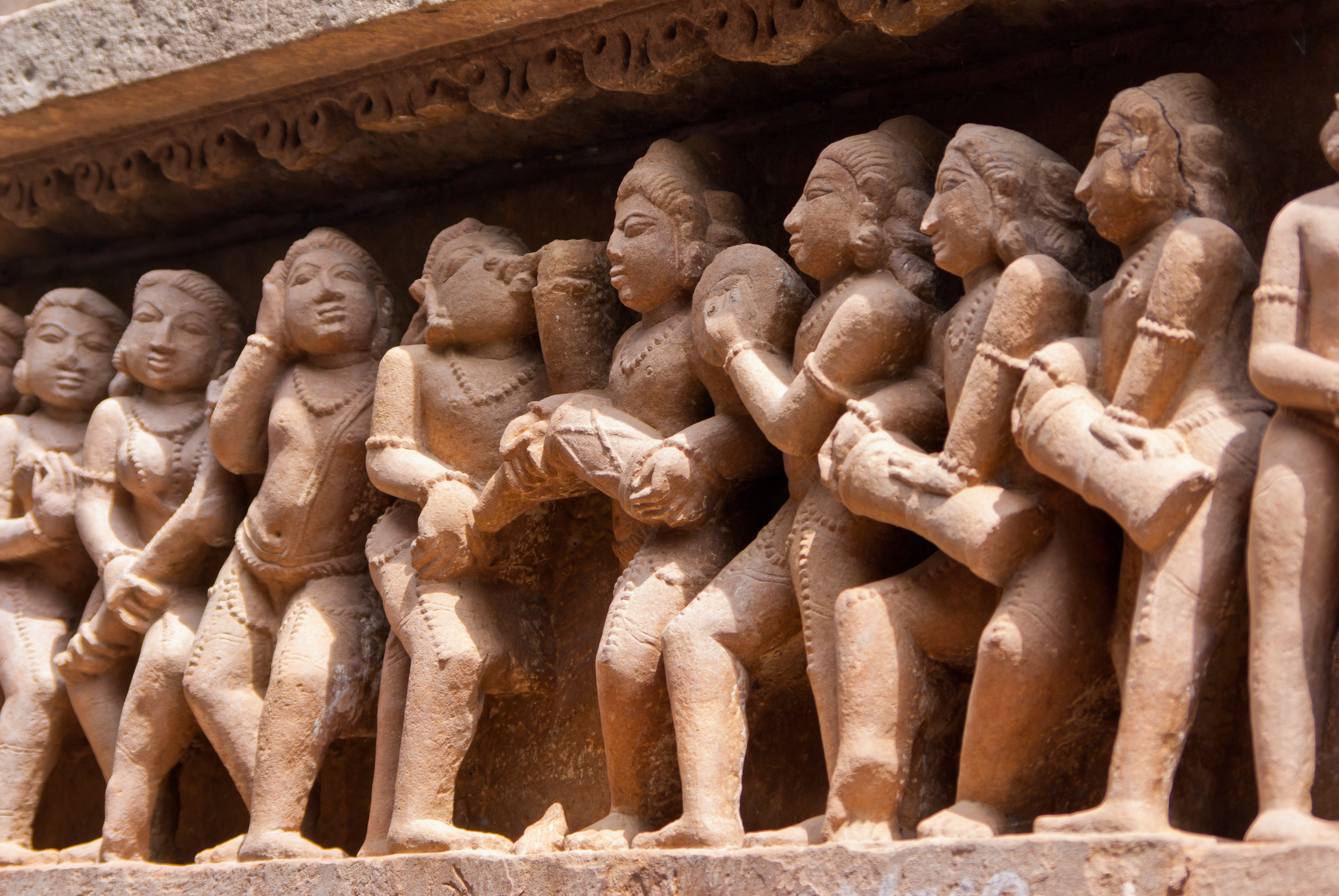

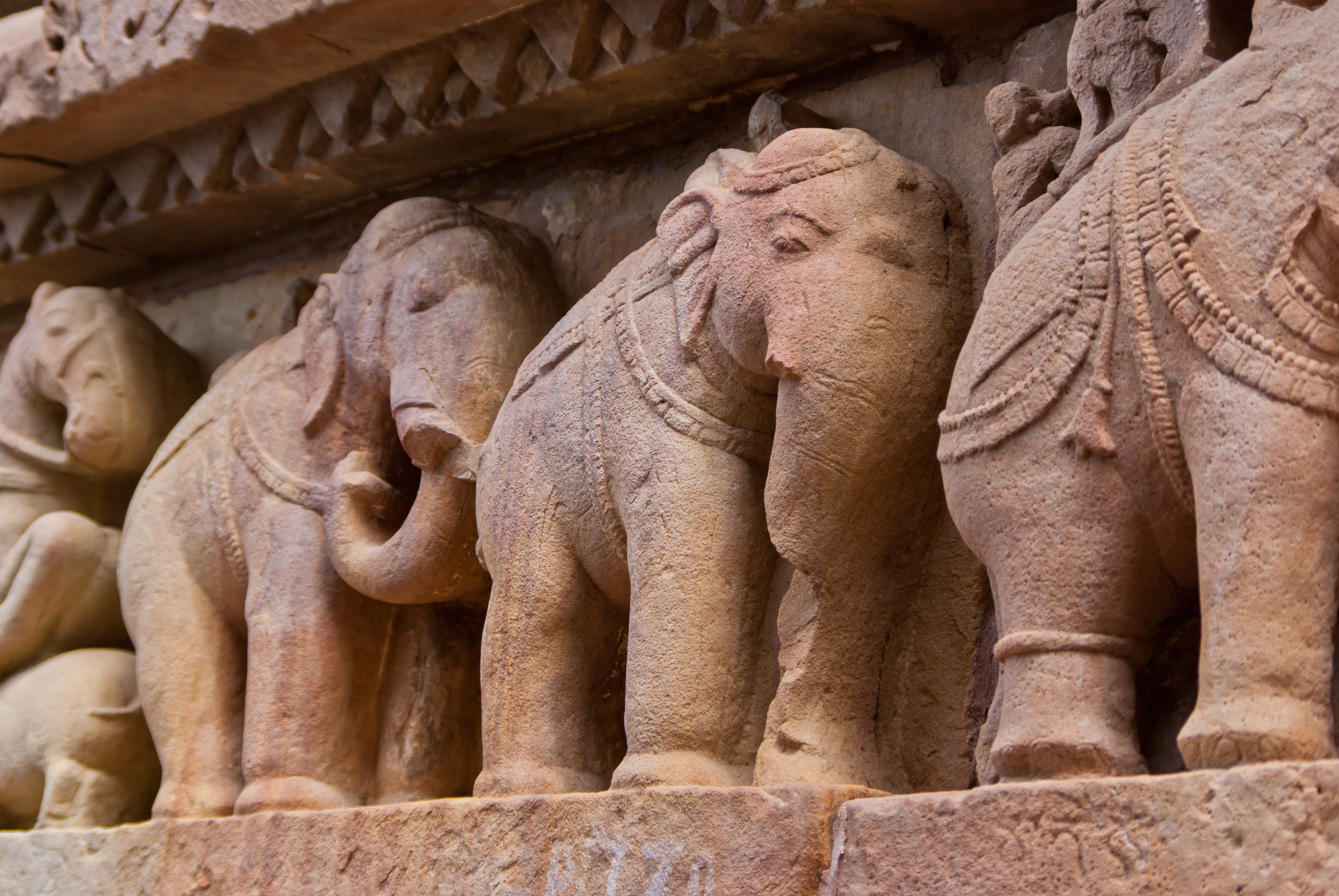

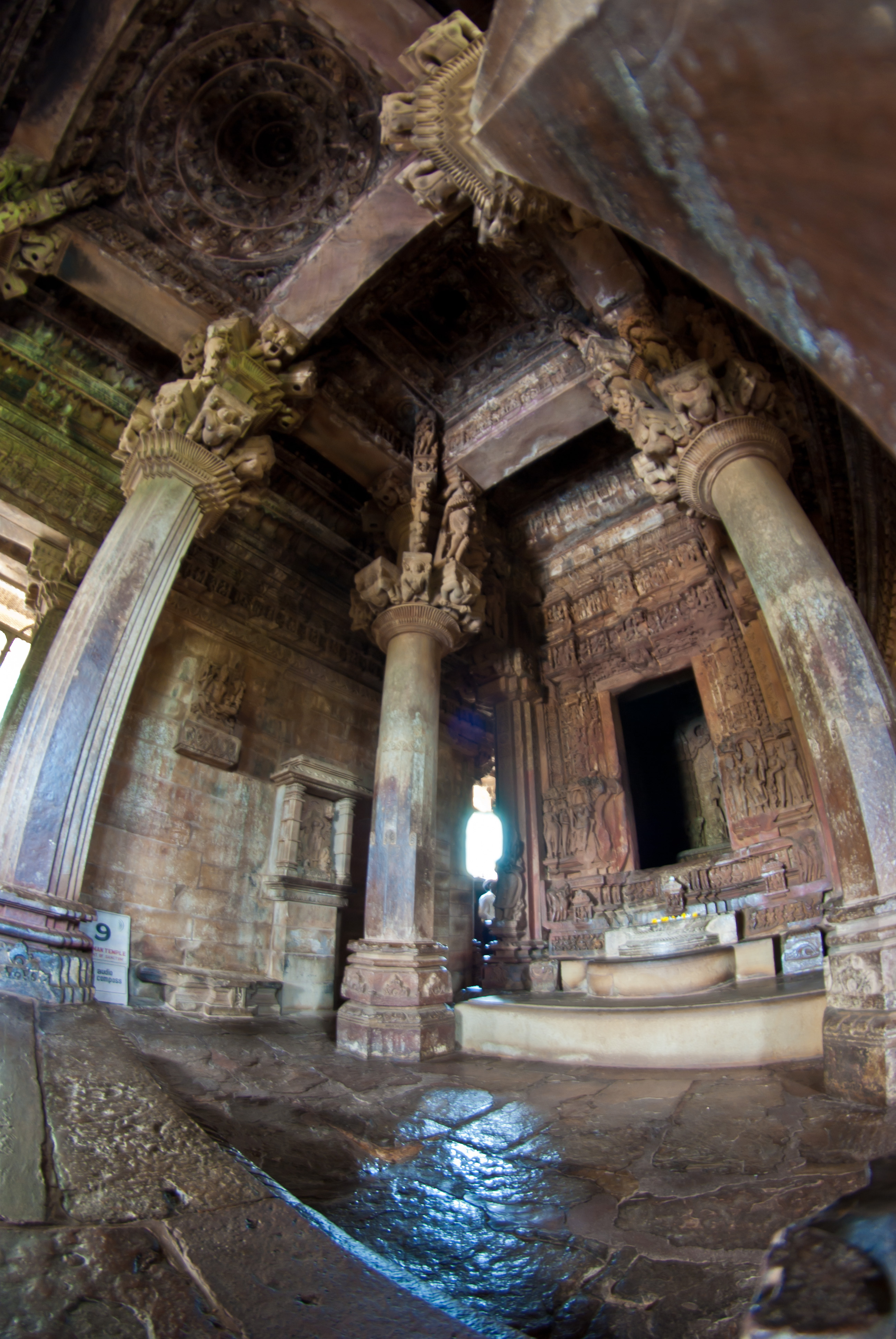

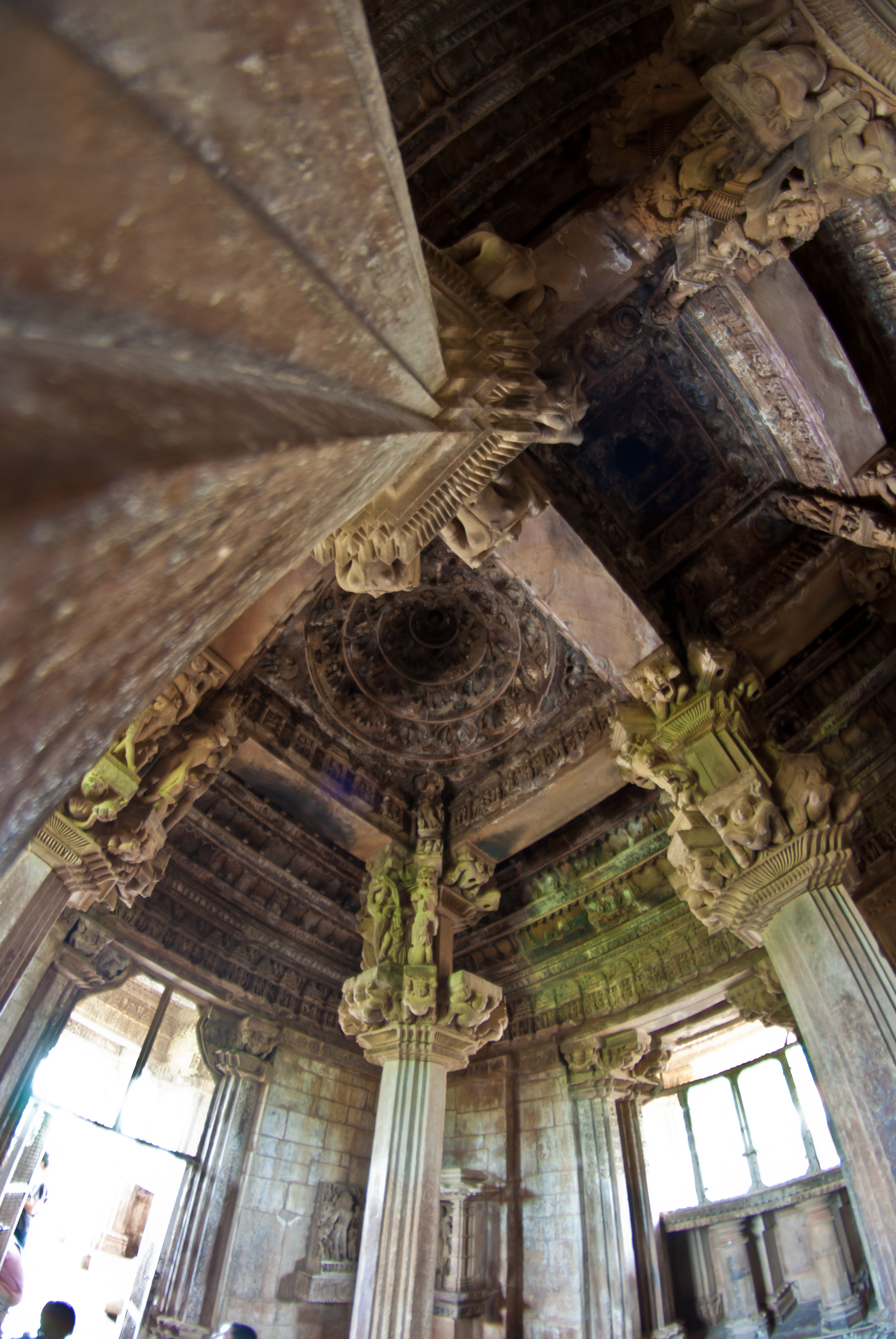

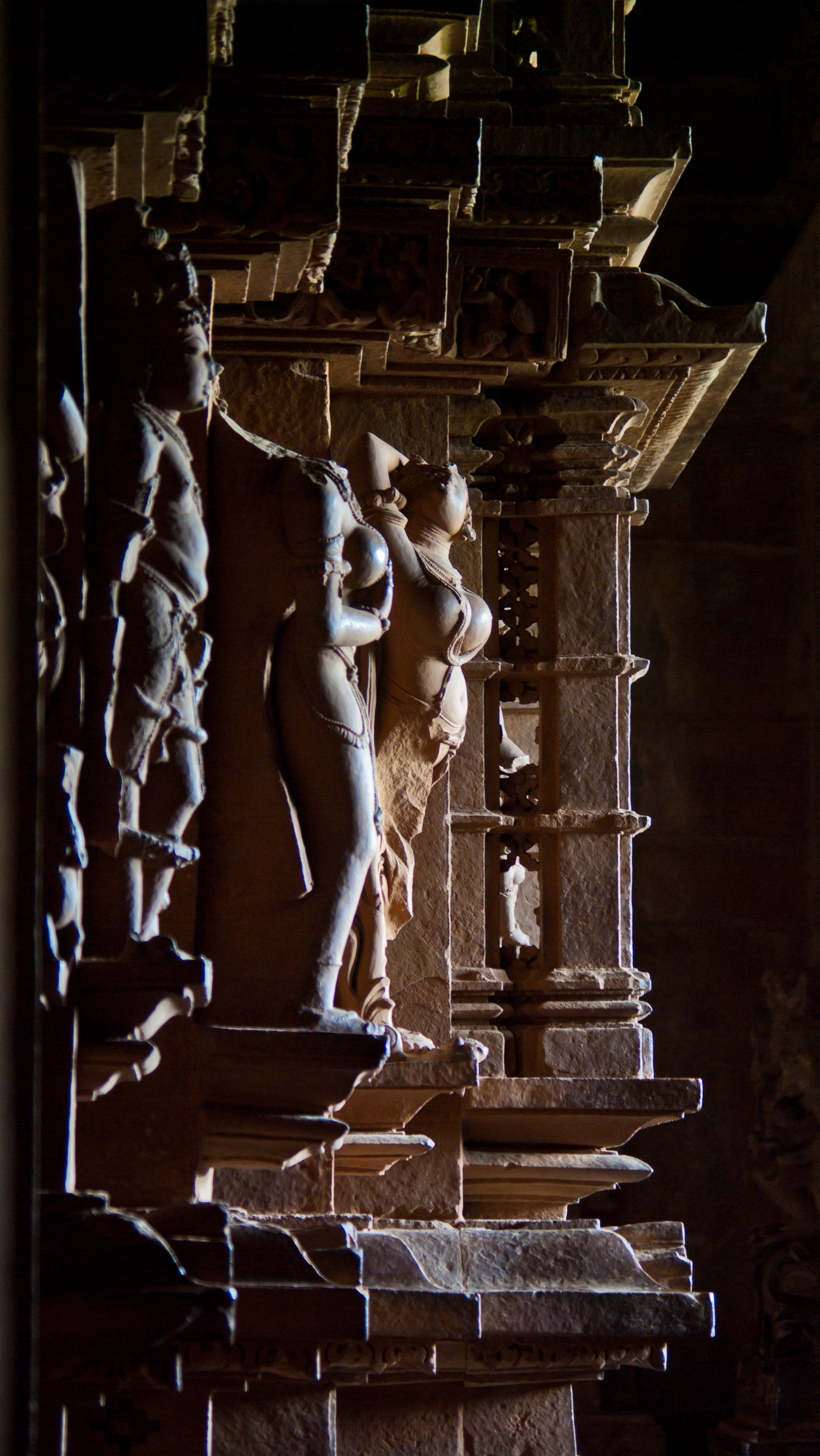

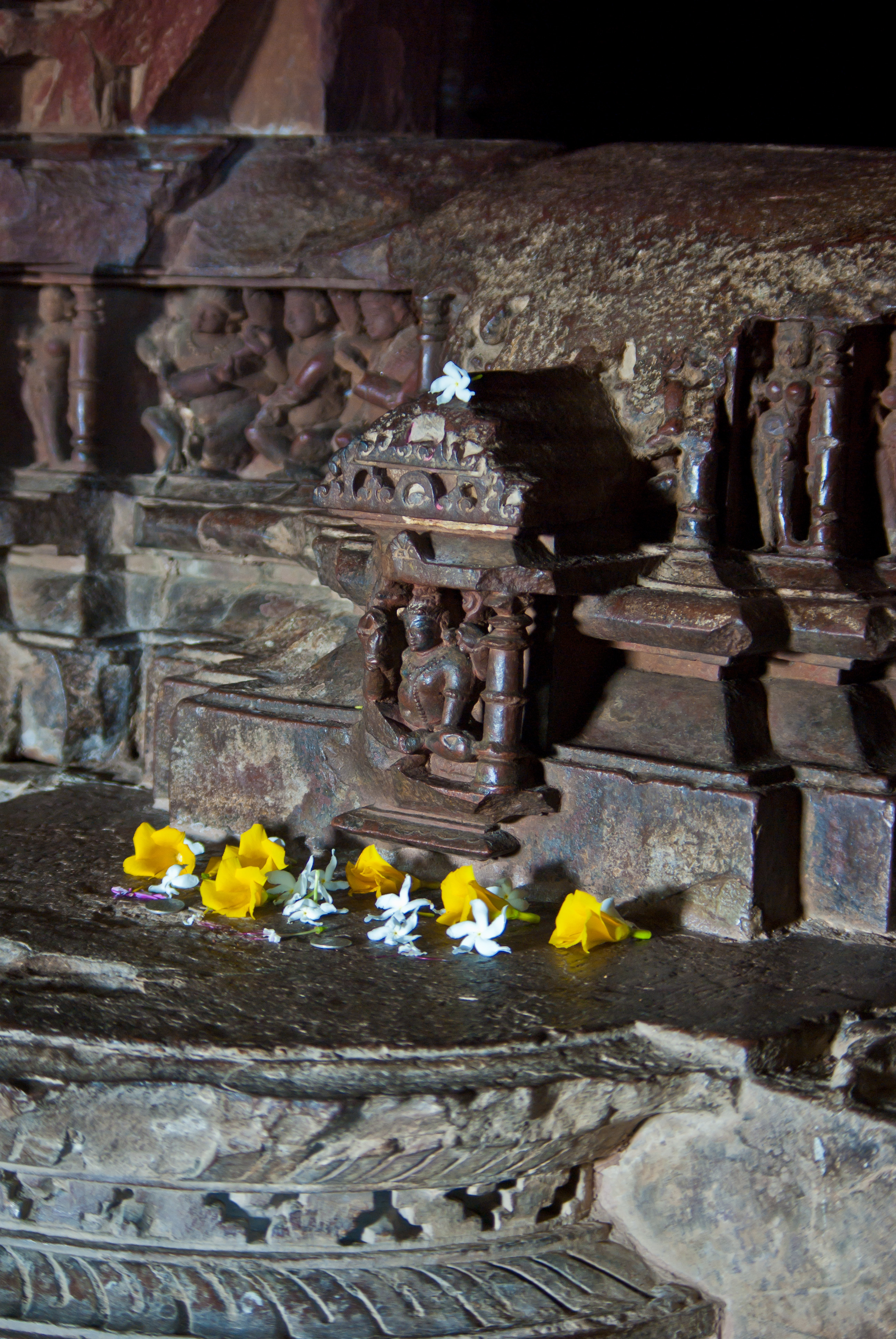

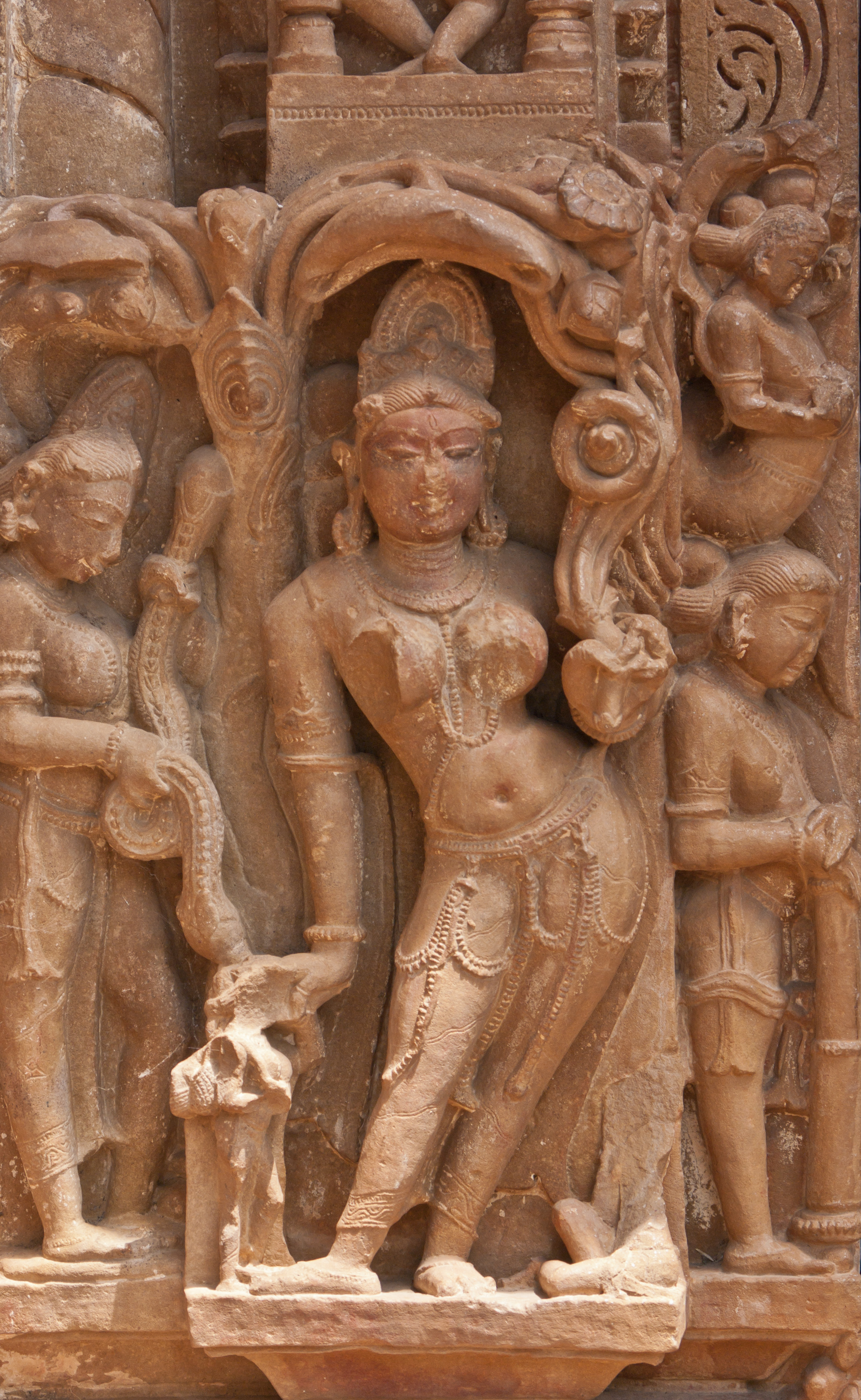

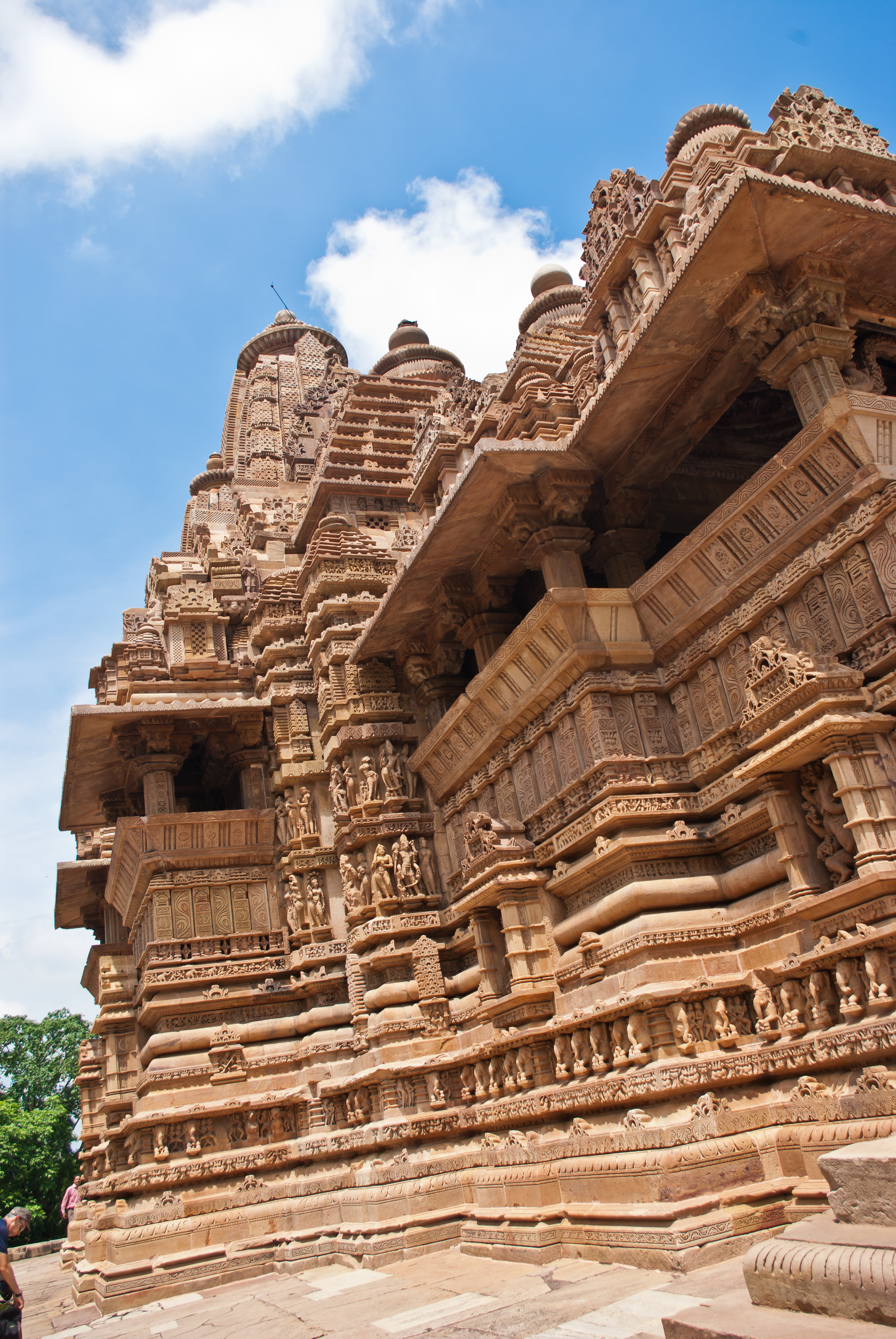

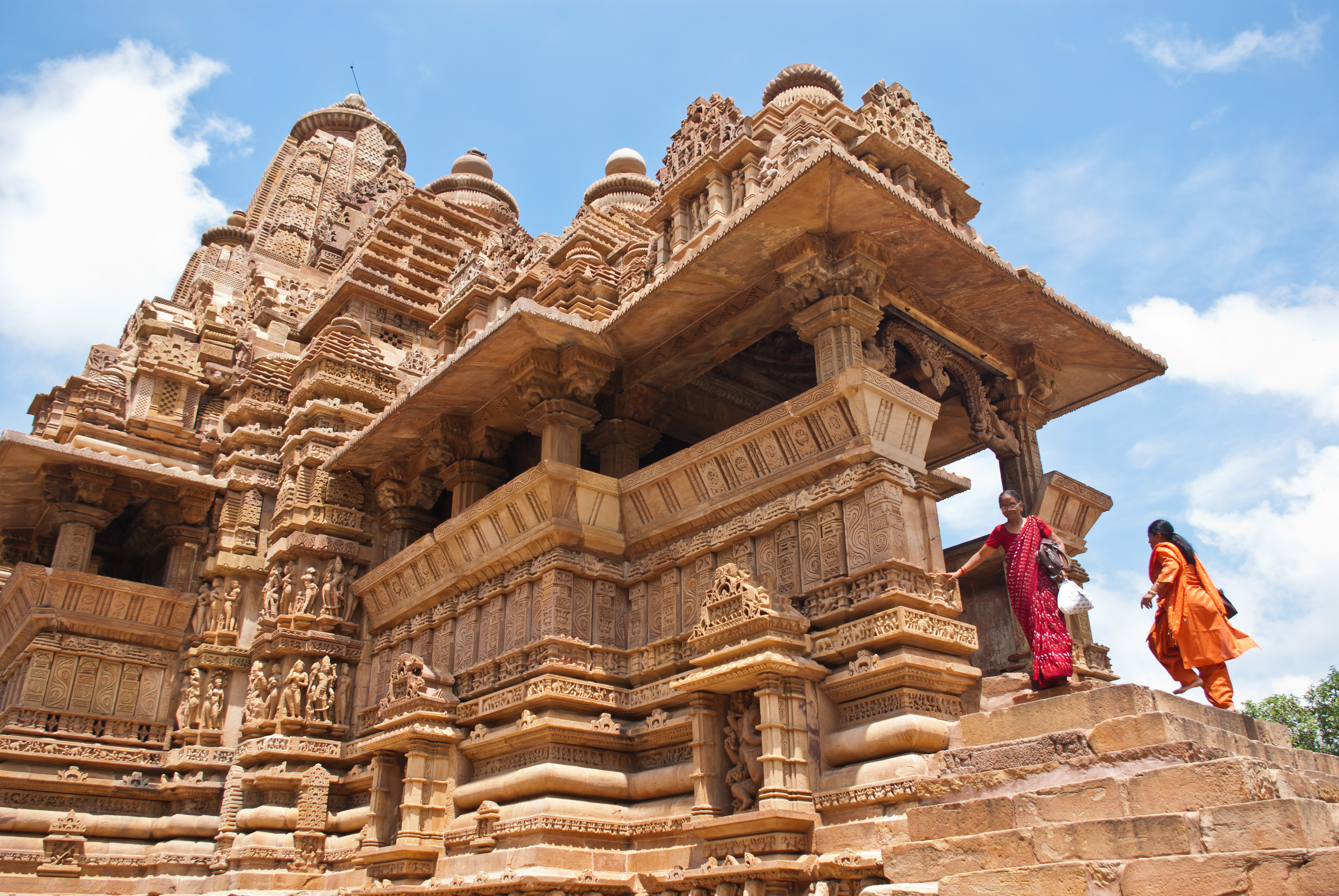

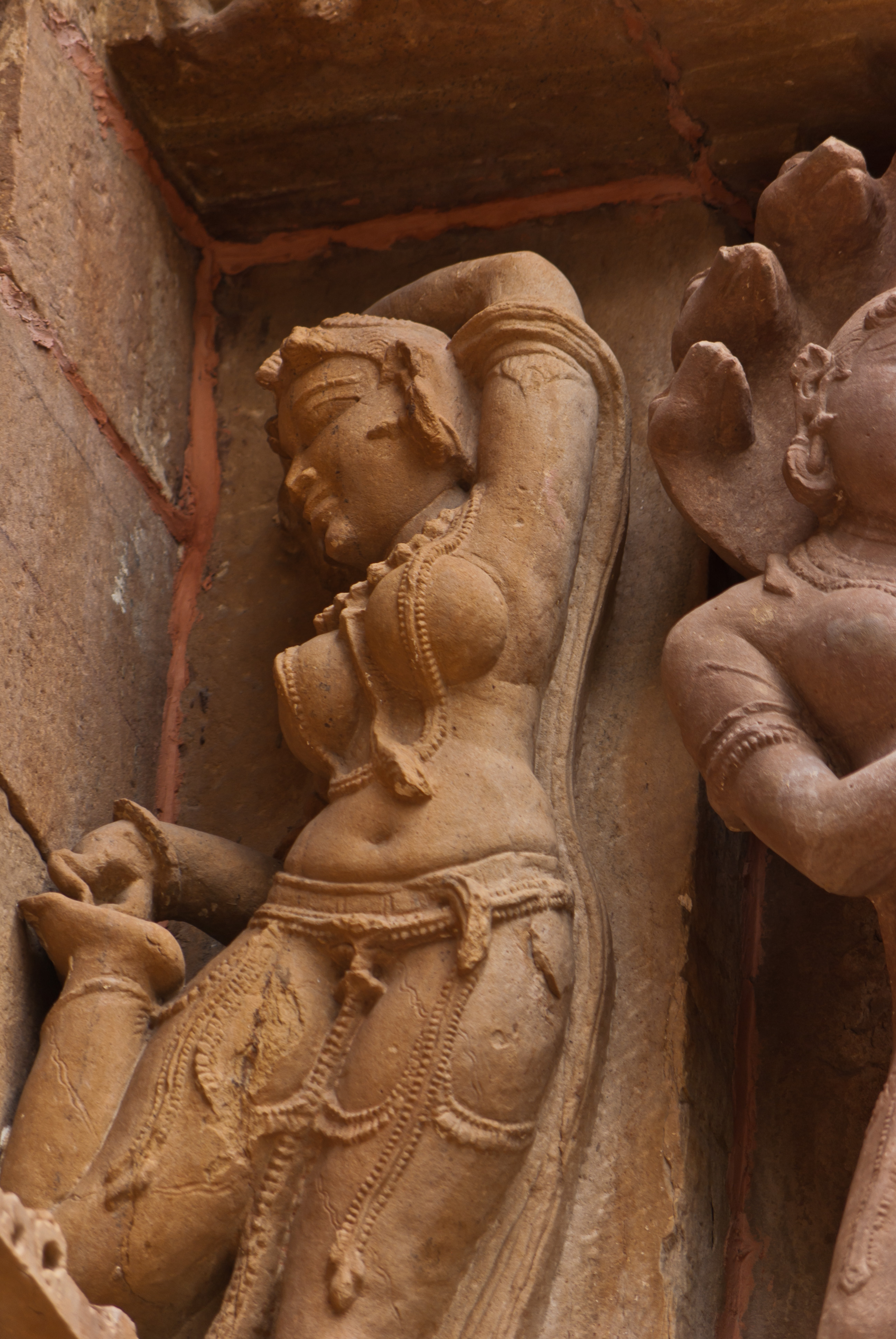

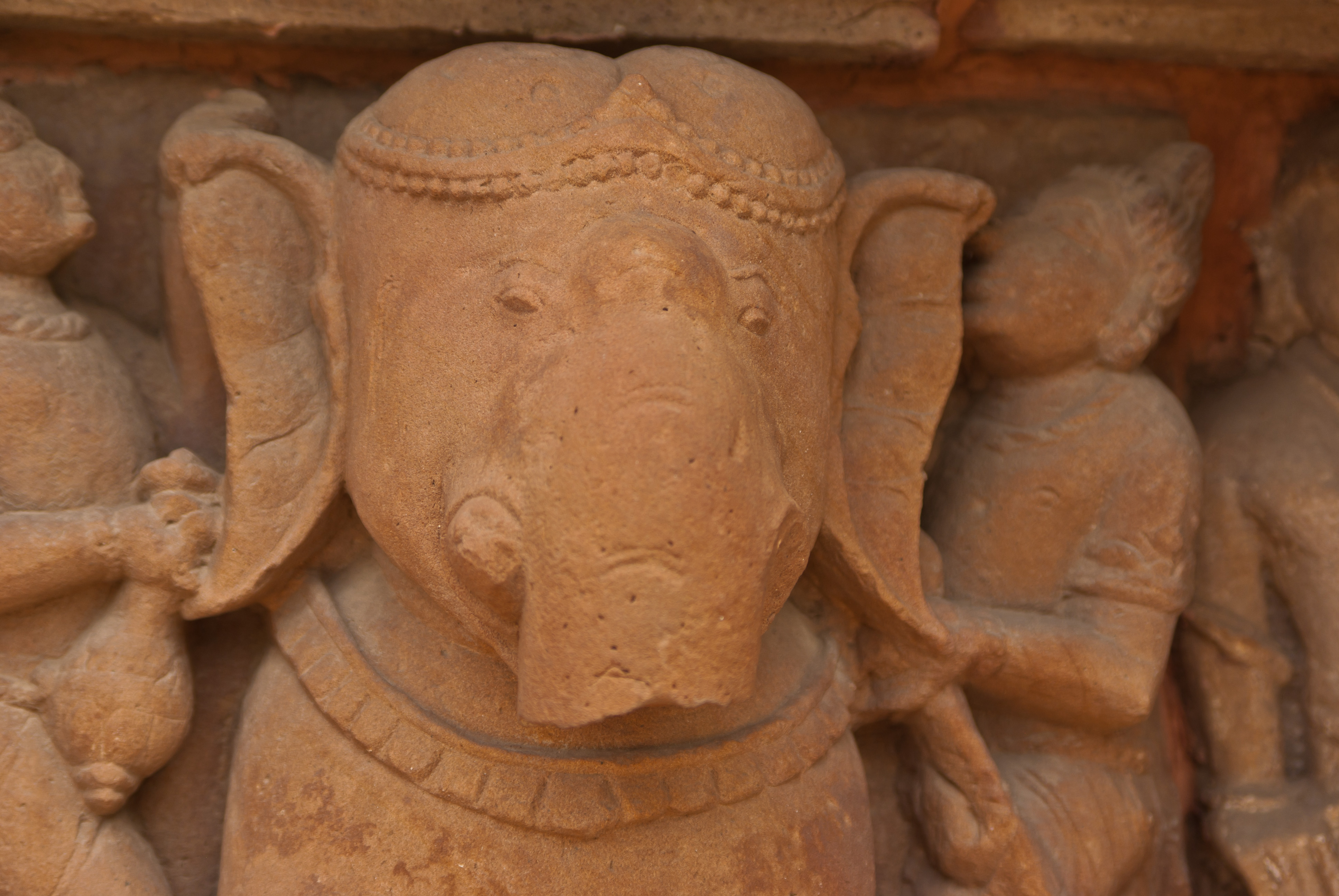

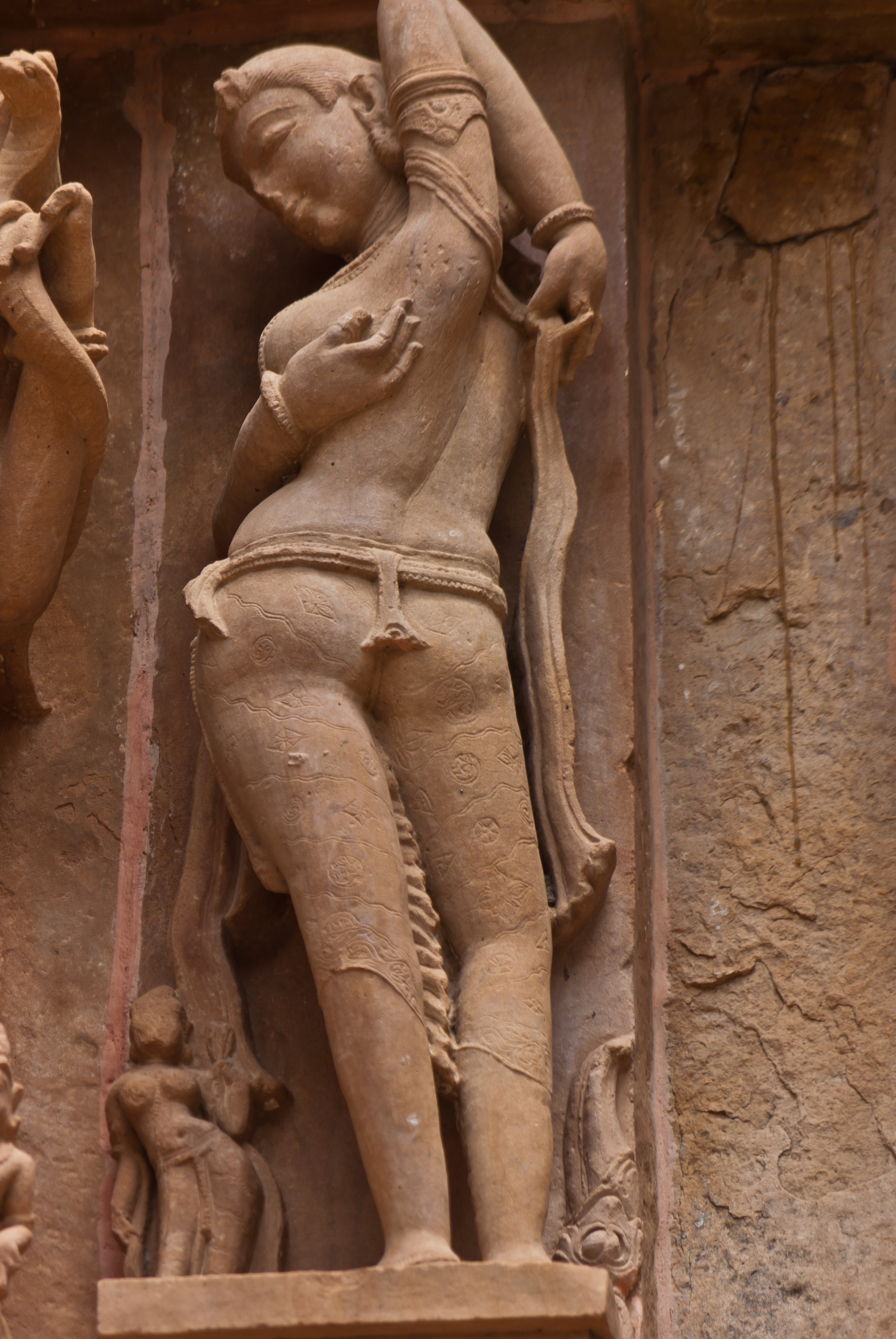

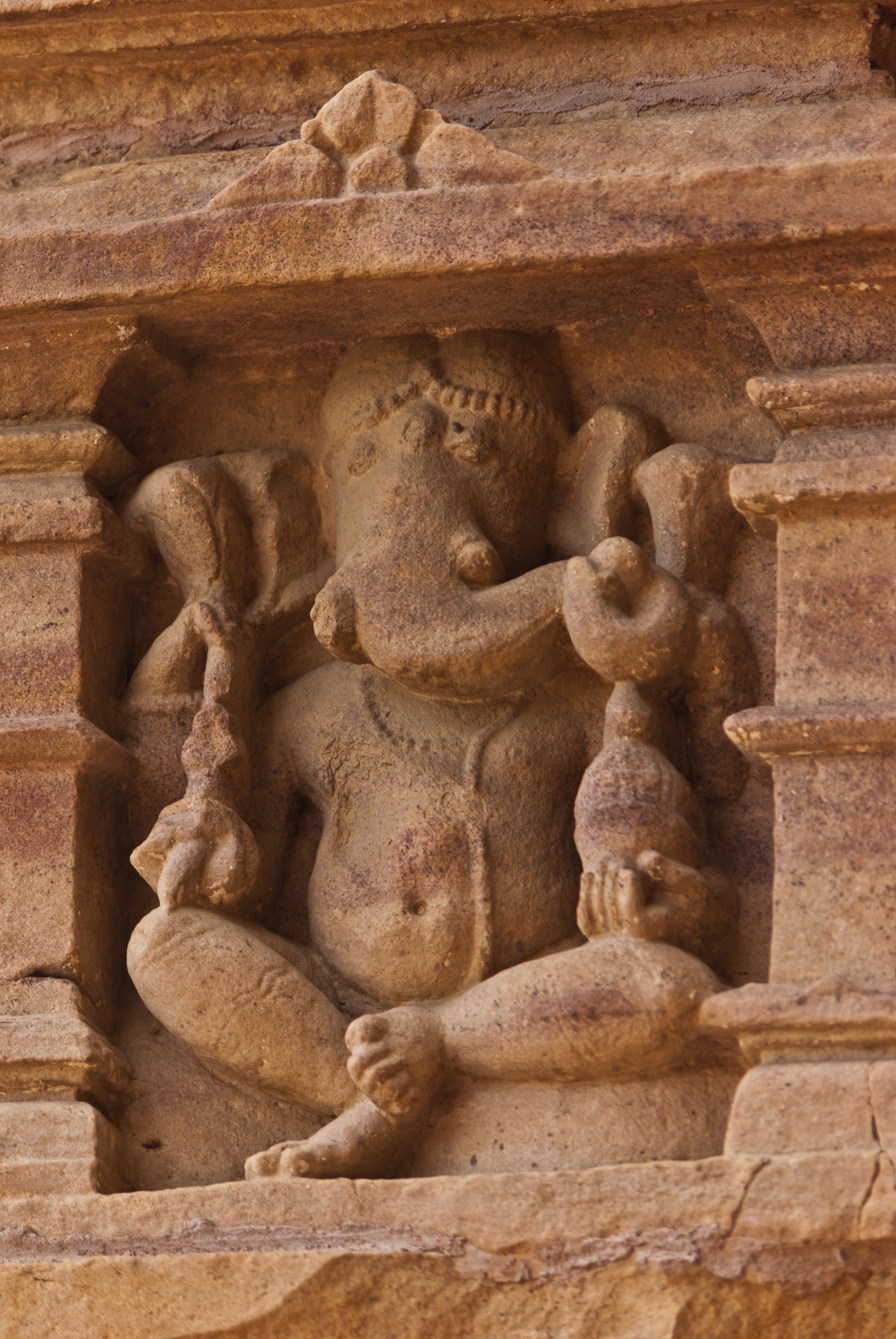

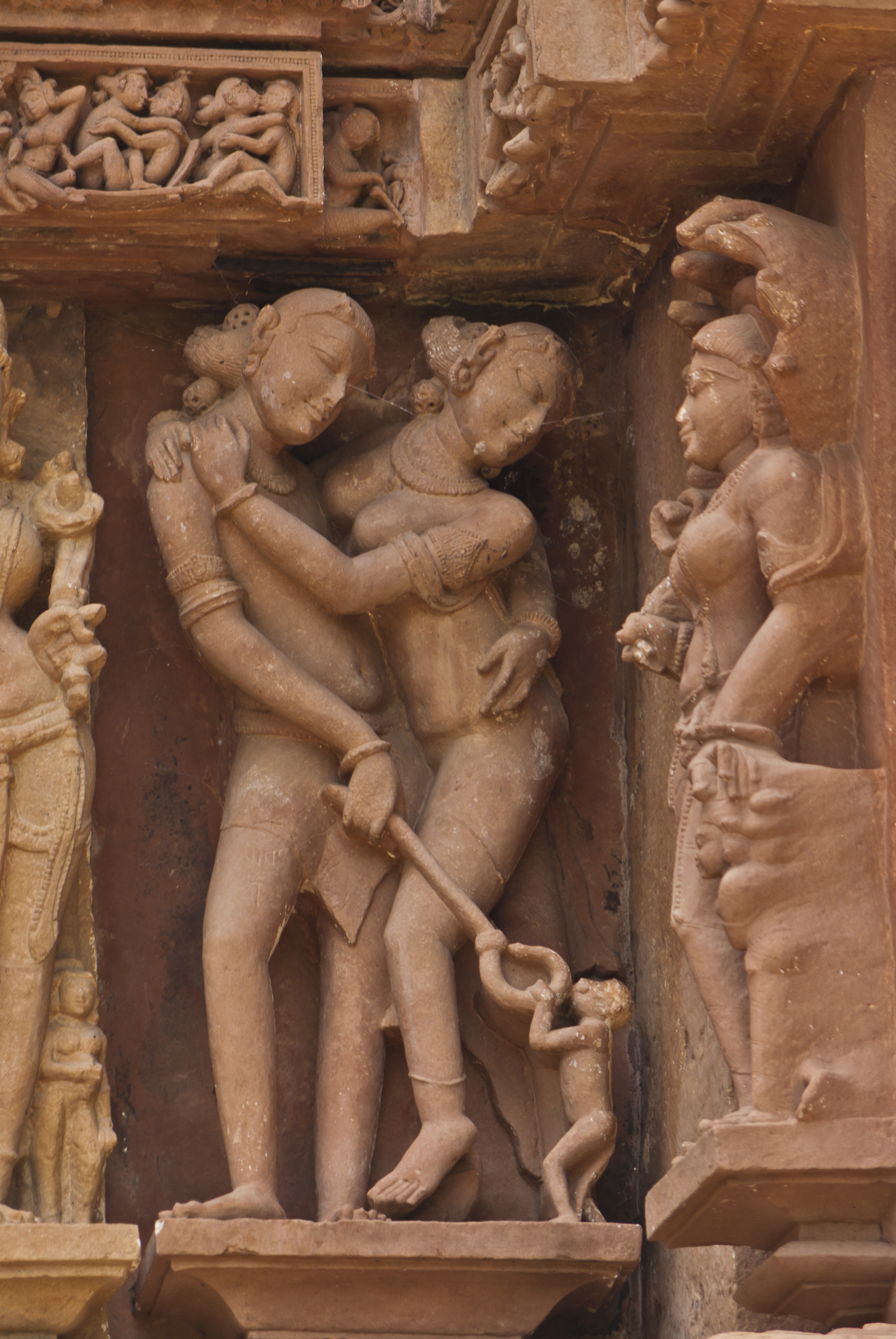

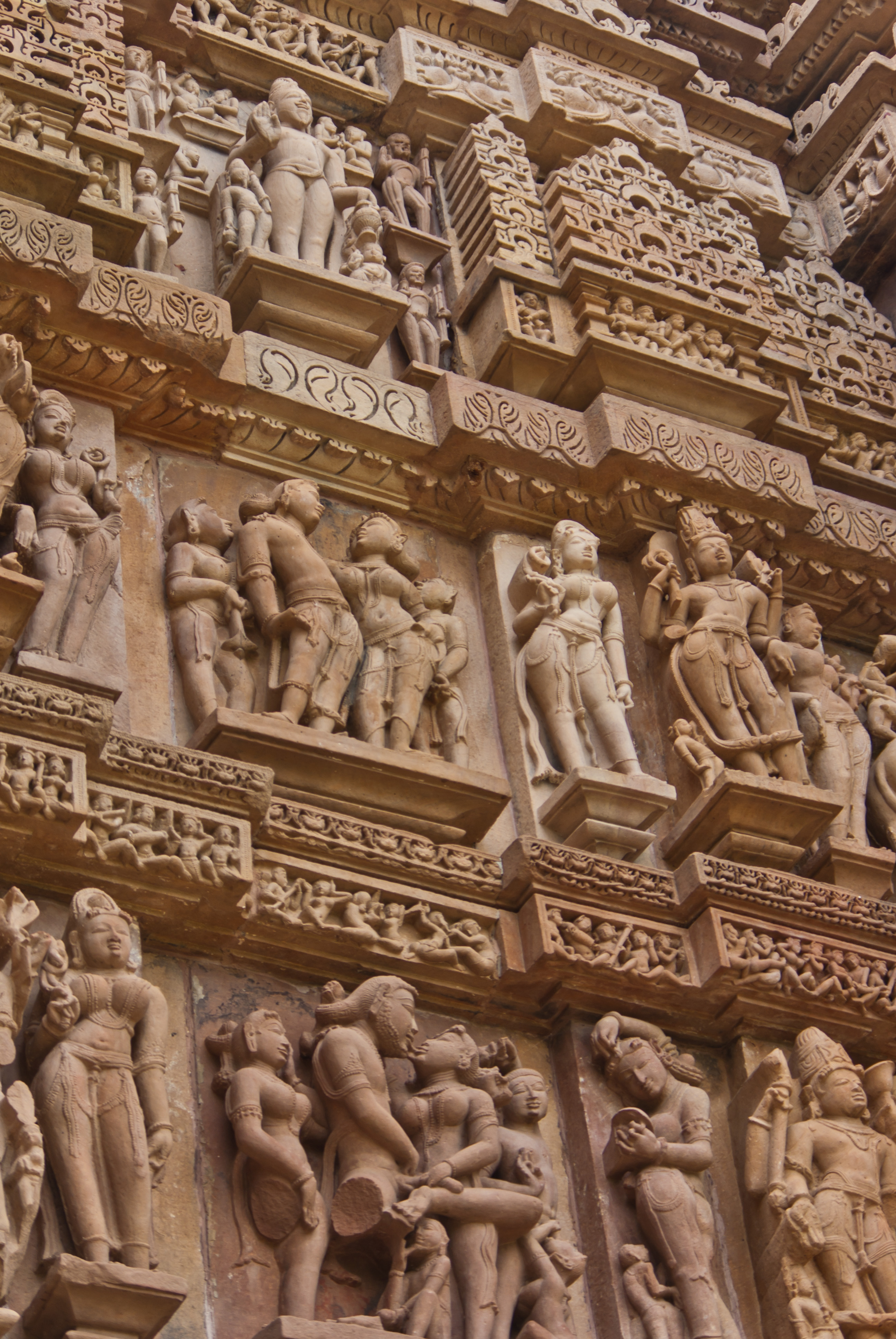

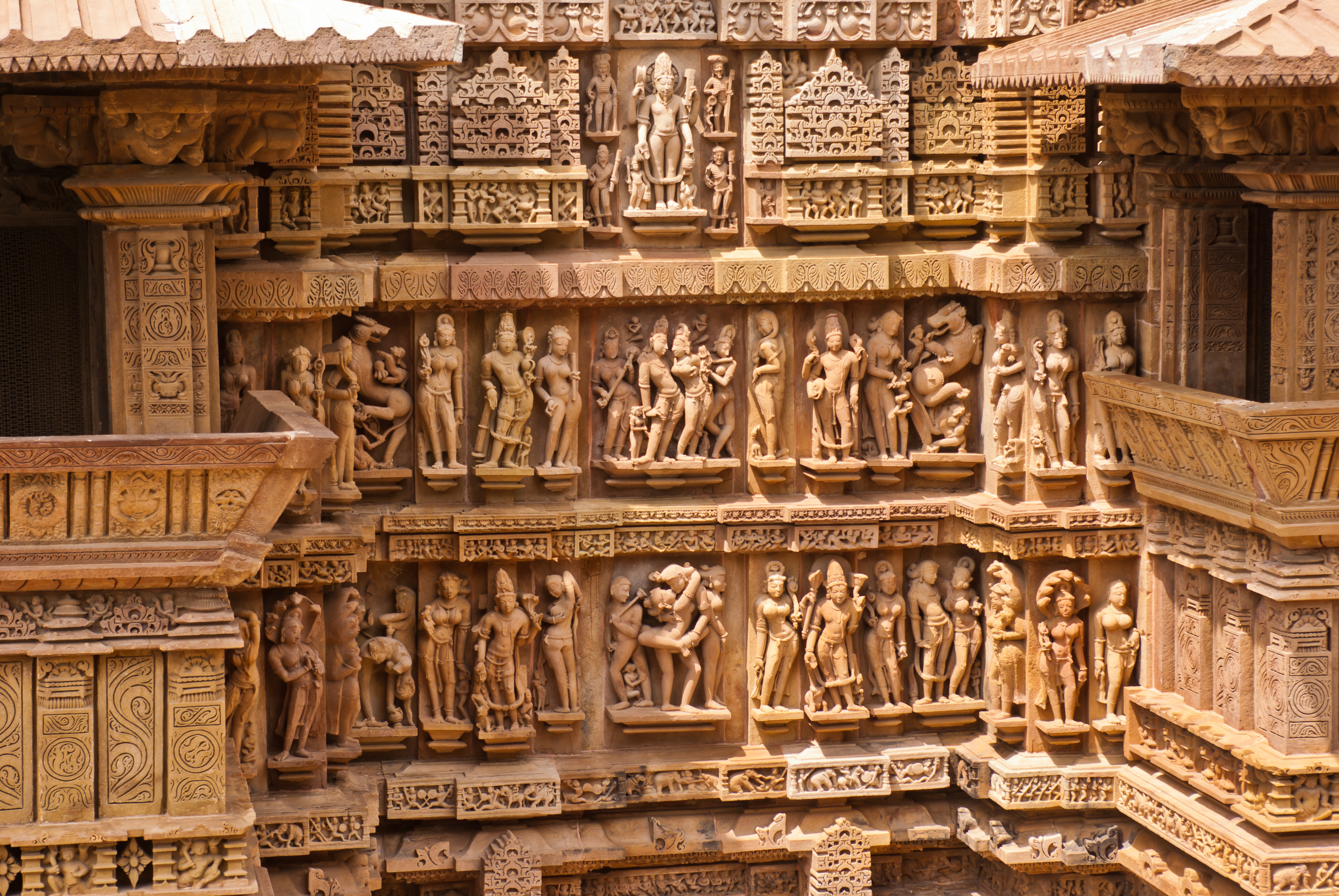

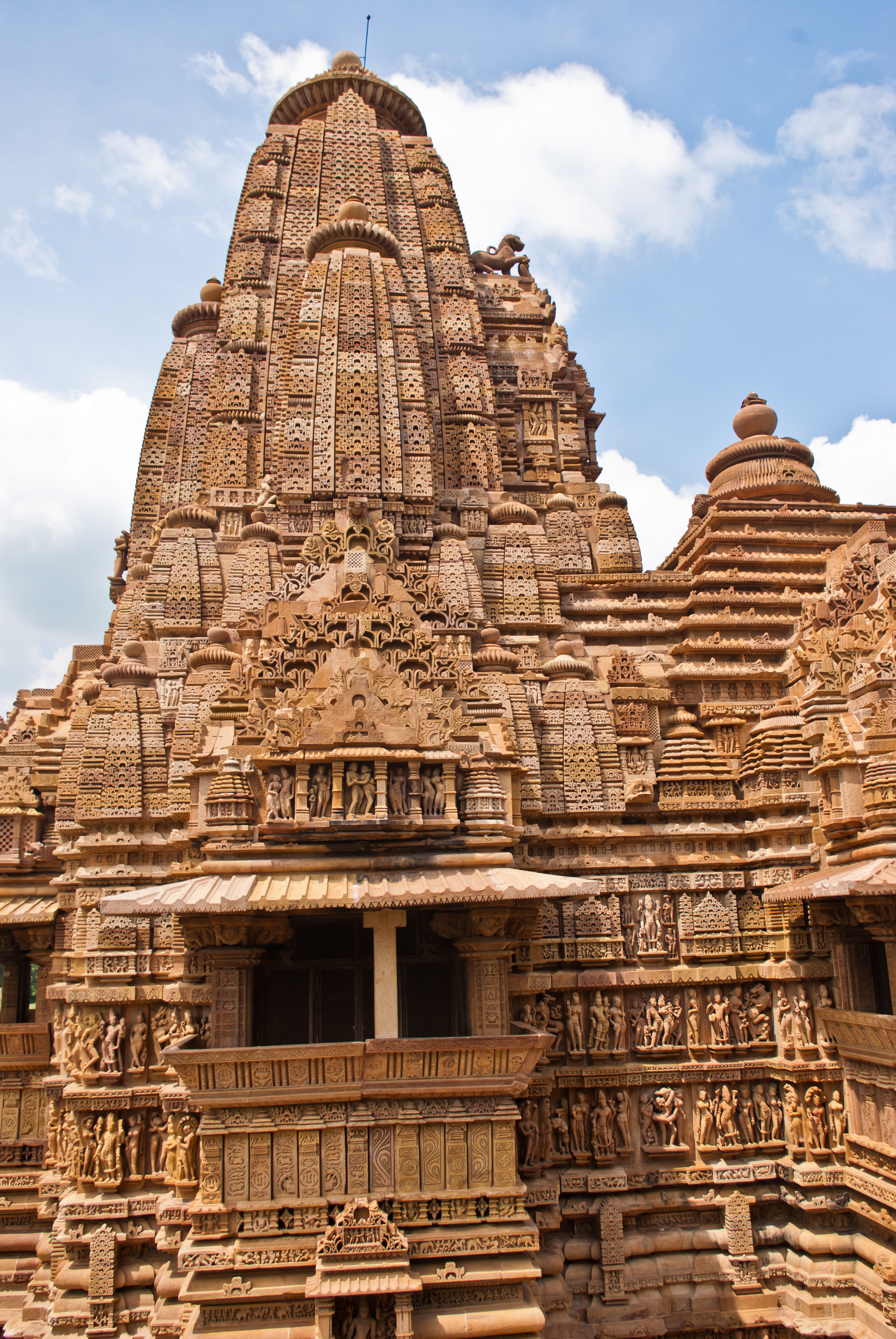

=== Outer wall sculpture ===
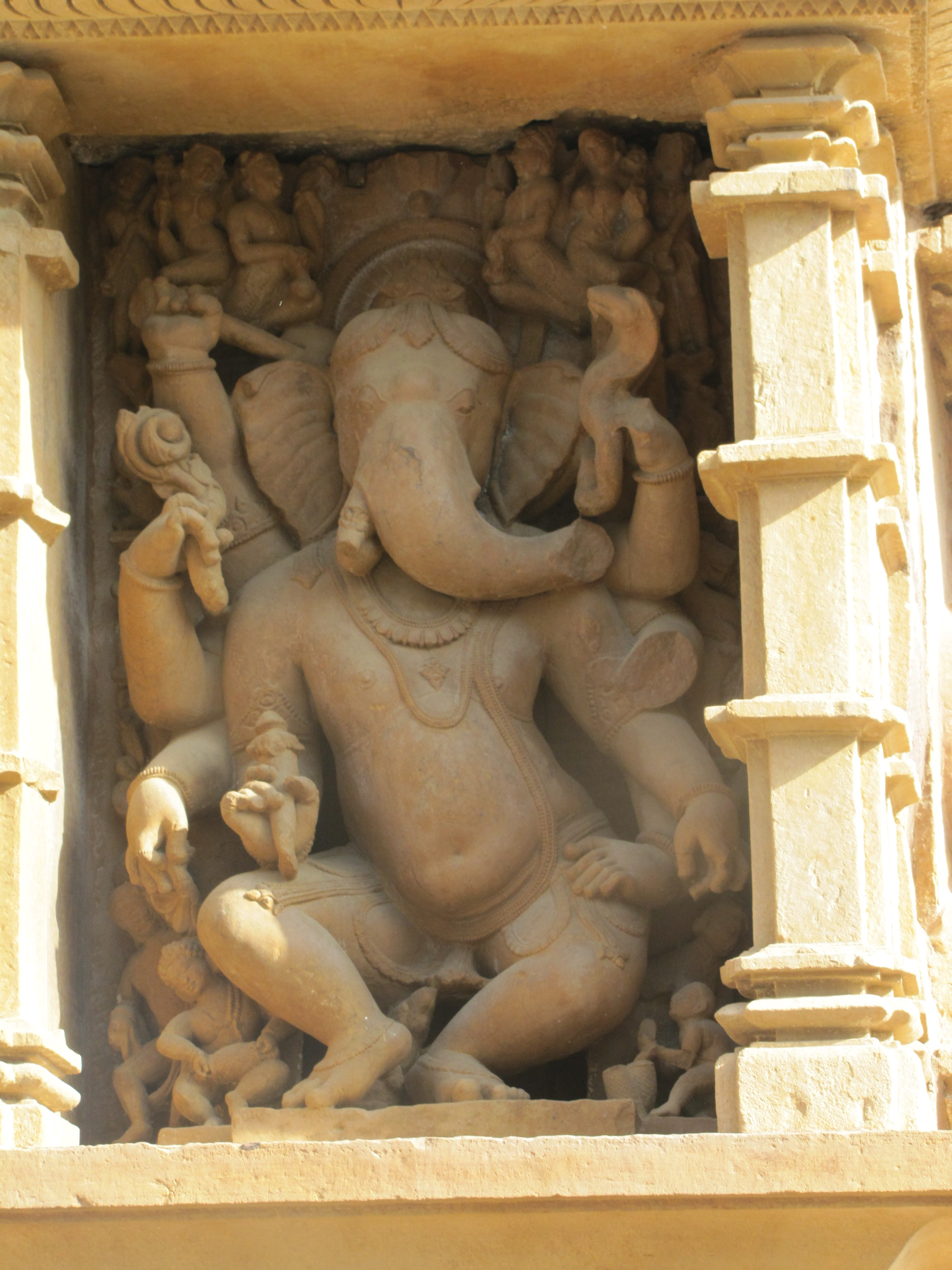
Ganesha sculpture (outer wall), Lakshman Temple, Khajuraho, India

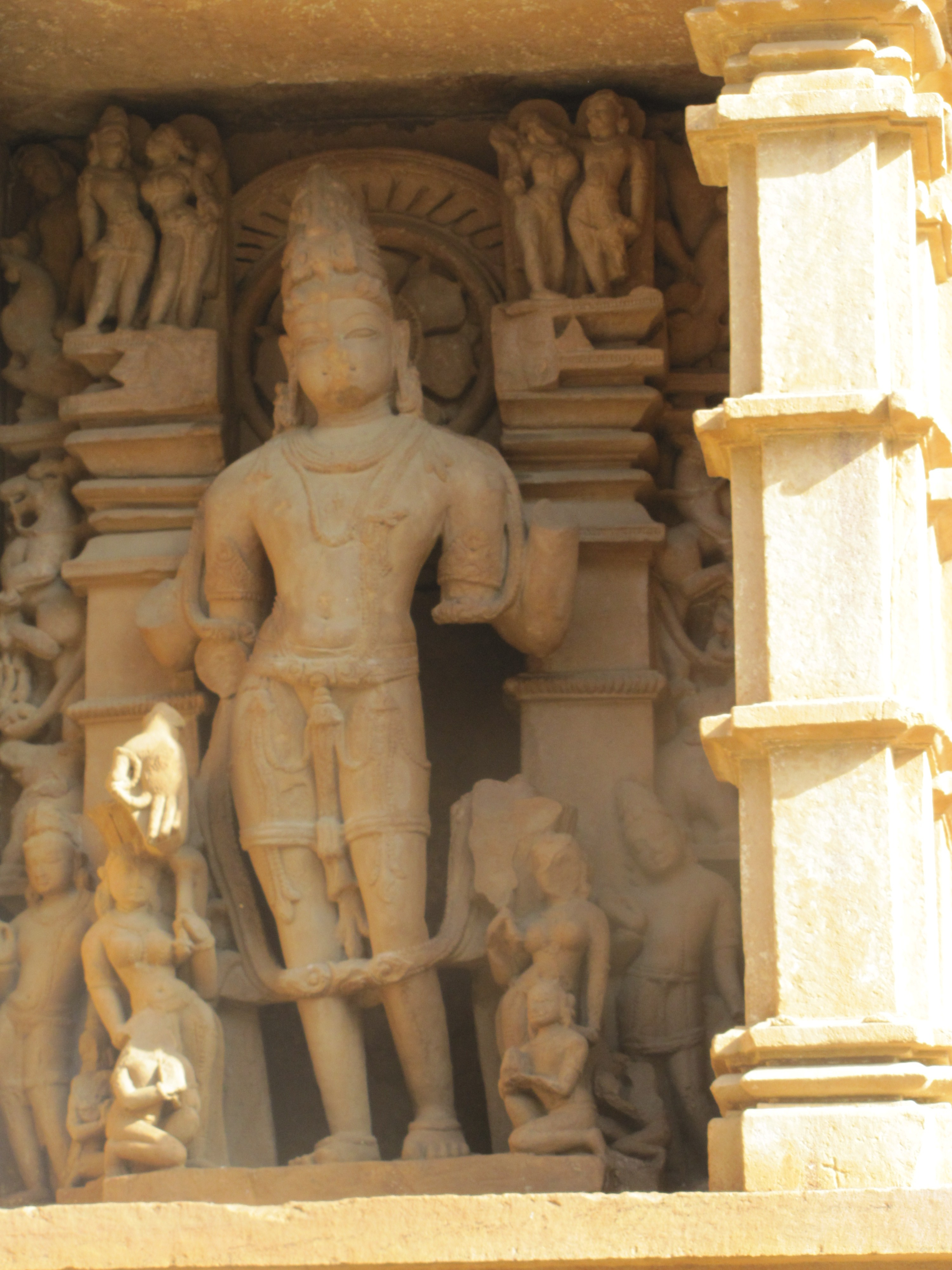
Sculpture (outer wall), Lakshman Temple, Khajuraho, India

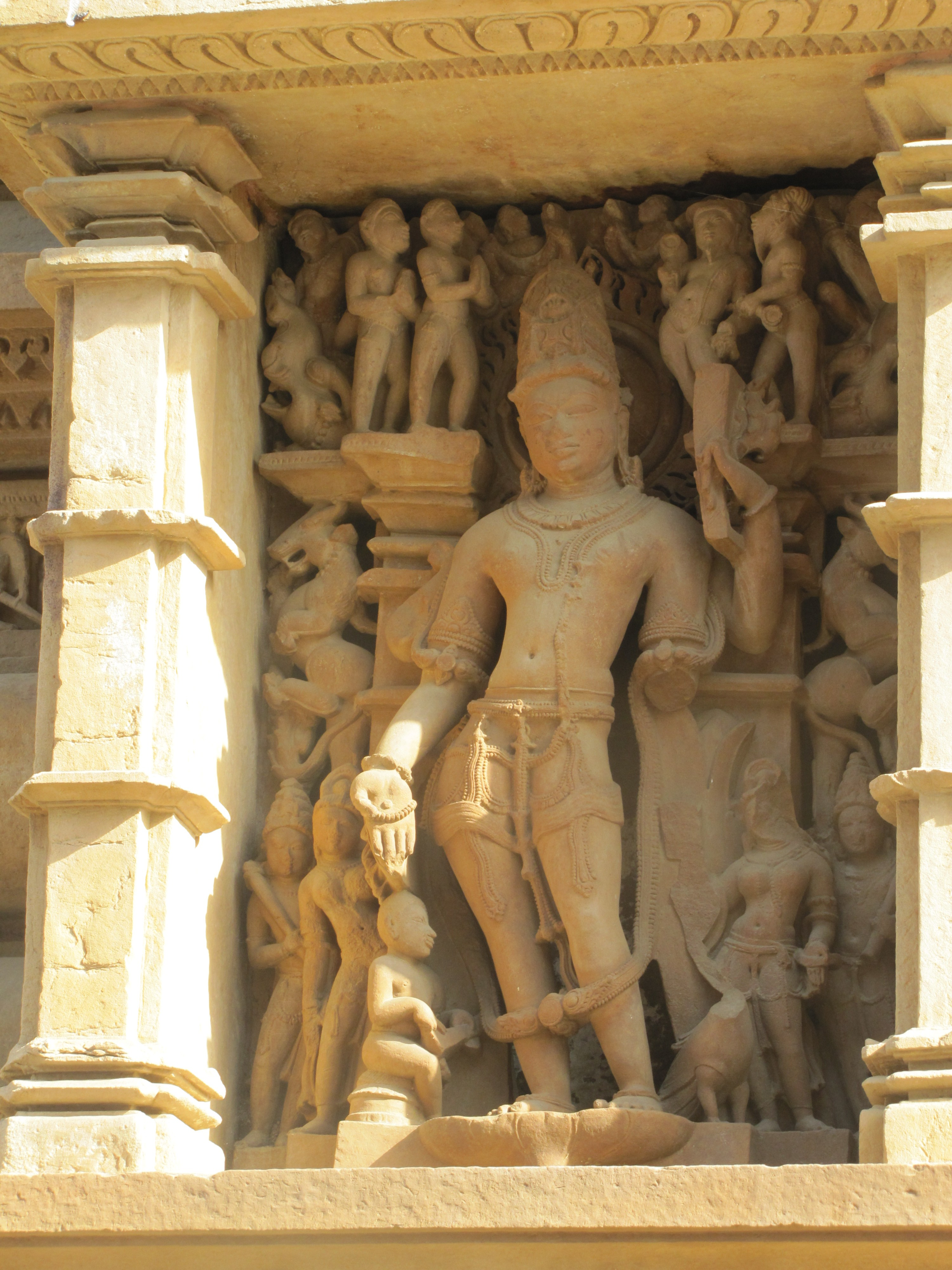
Sculpture (outer wall), Lakshman Temple, Khajuraho, India

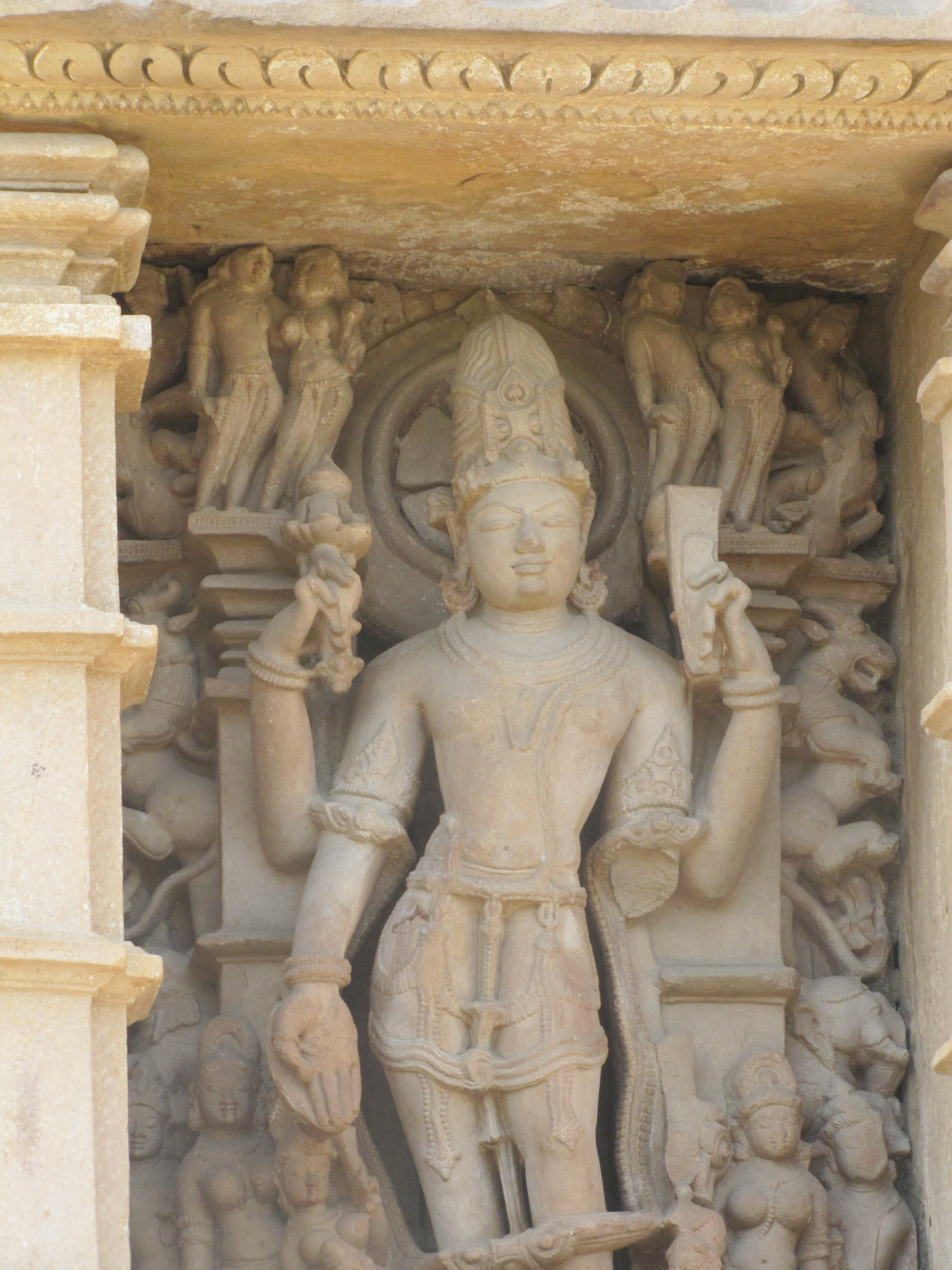
Sculpture (outer wall), Lakshman Temple, Khajuraho, India

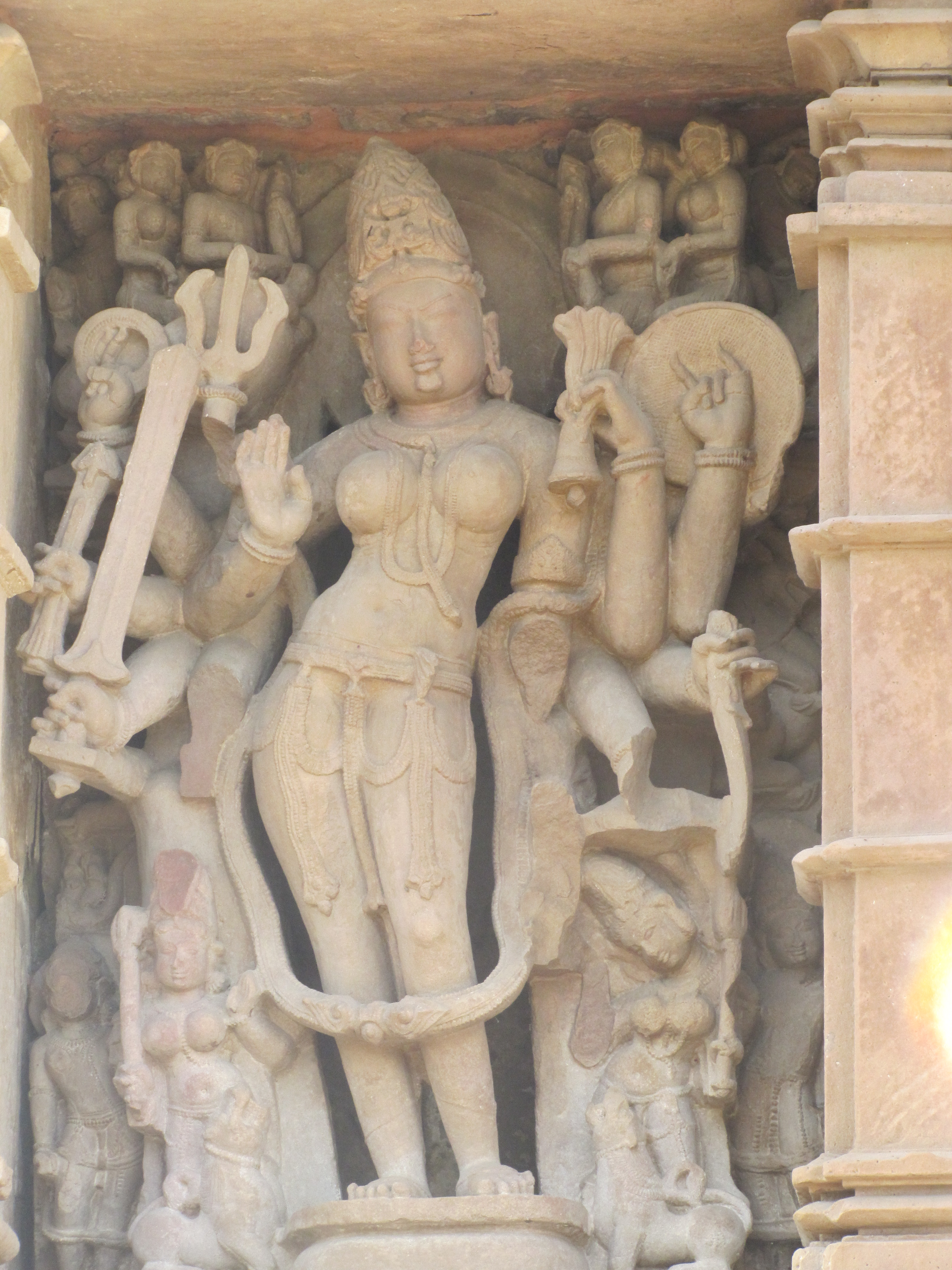
Sculpture (outer wall), Lakshman Temple, Khajuraho, India

=== Sculptures inside temple ===
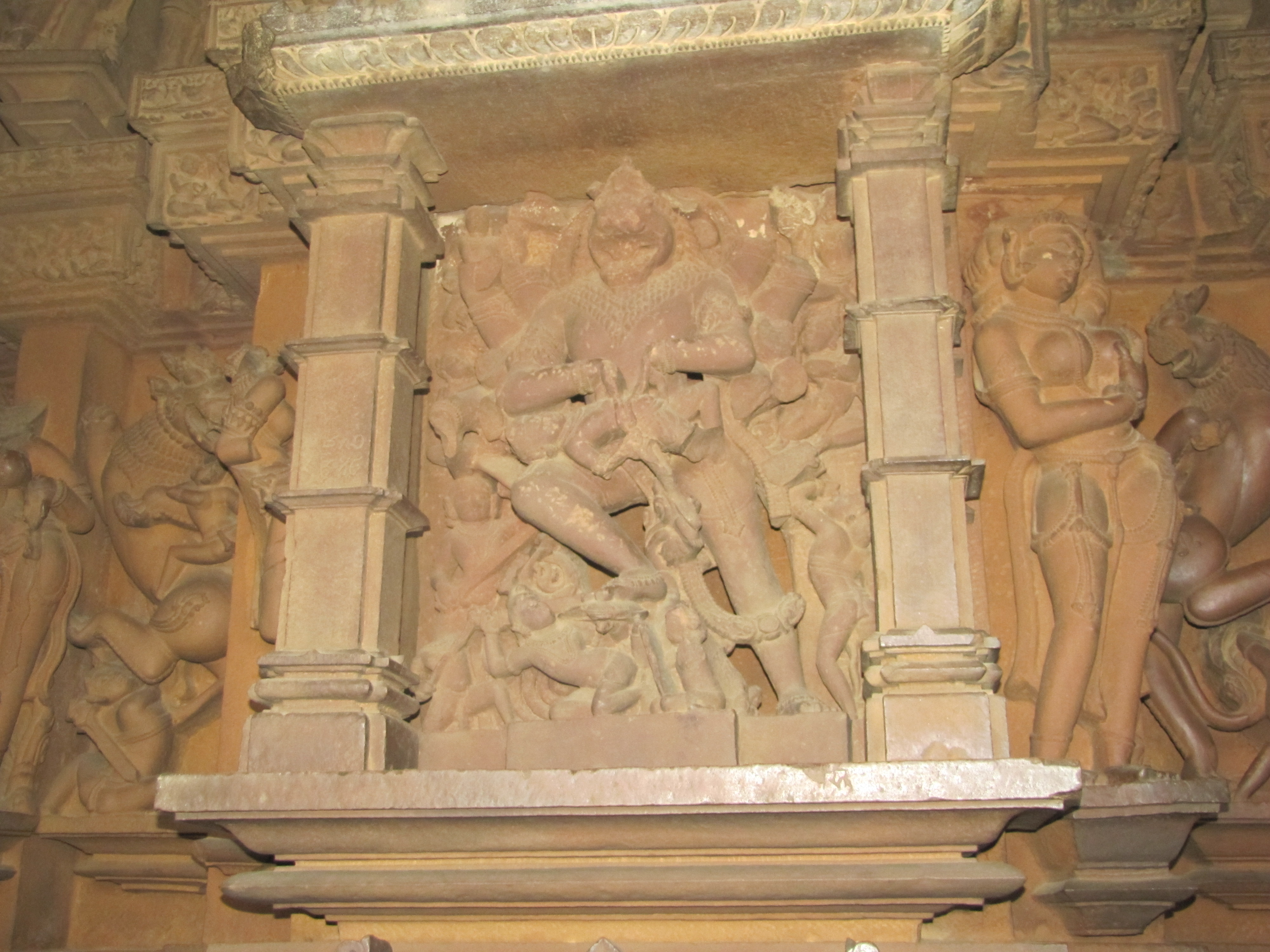
Narshima sculpture (inside temple sanctum), Lakshman Temple, Khajuraho, India

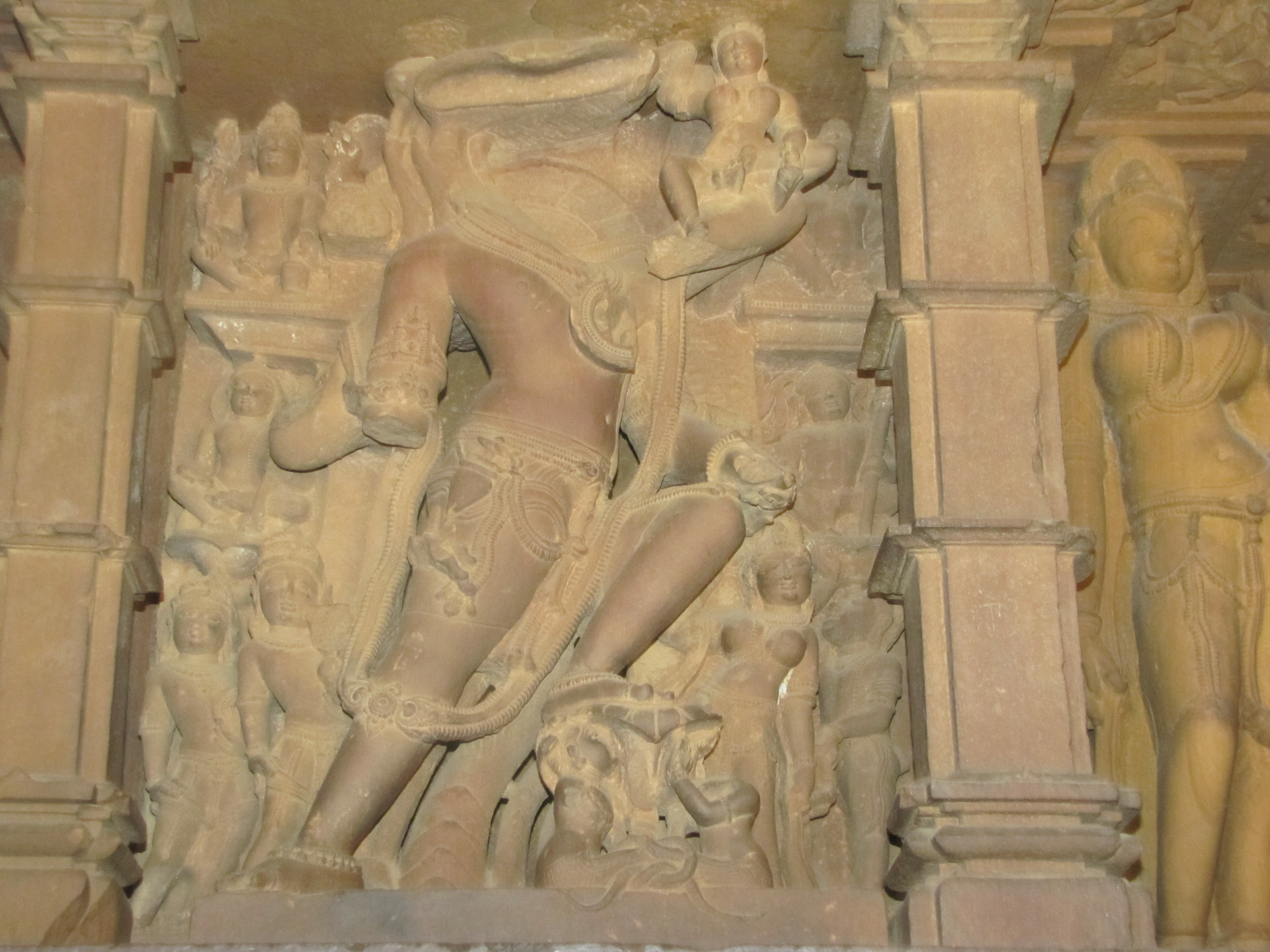
Damaged Varaha sculpture (inside temple sanctum), Lakshman Temple, Khajuraho, India

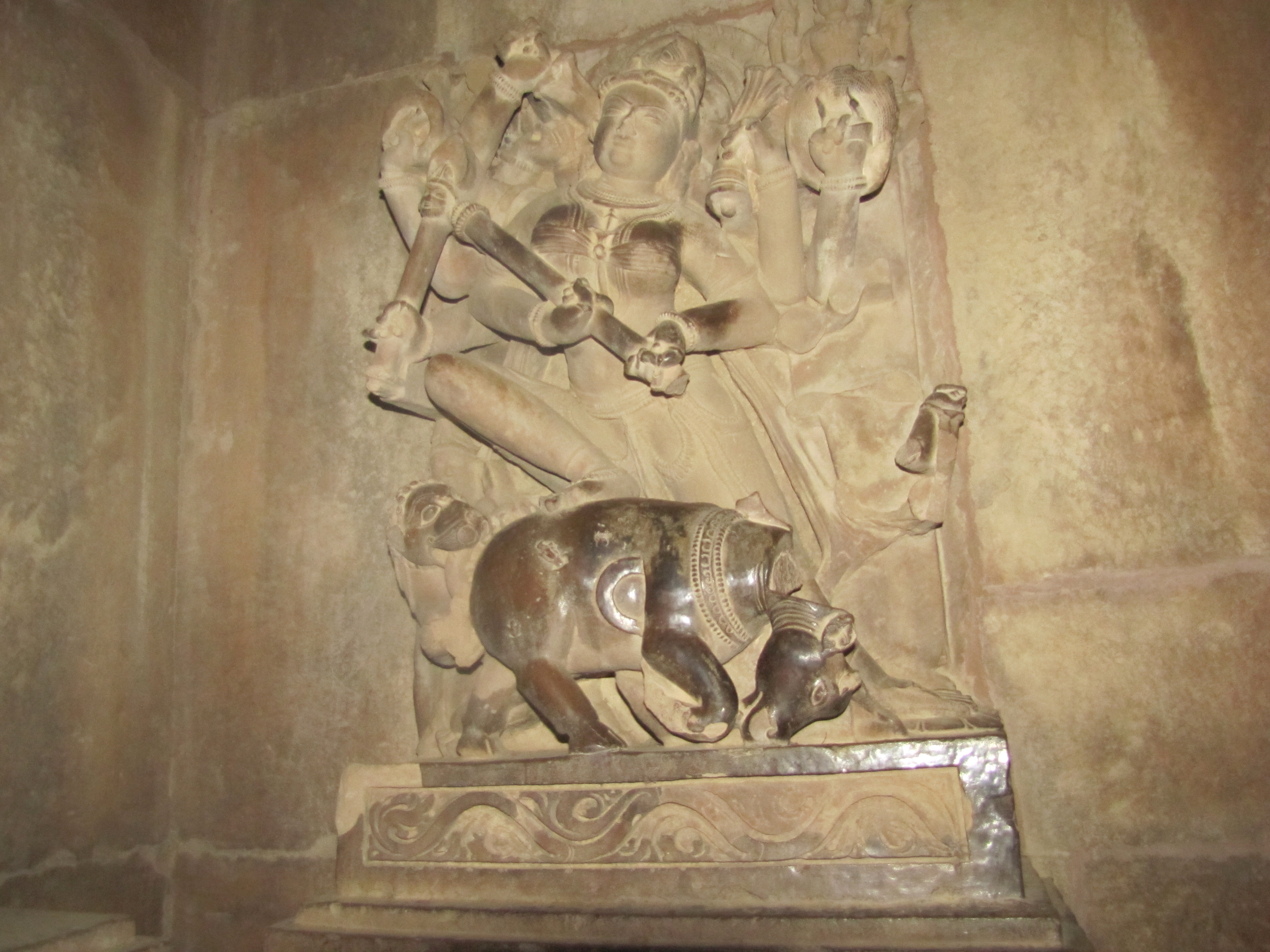
Devi Killing Mahisasura sculpture (inside temple sanctum), Lakshman Temple, Khajuraho, India

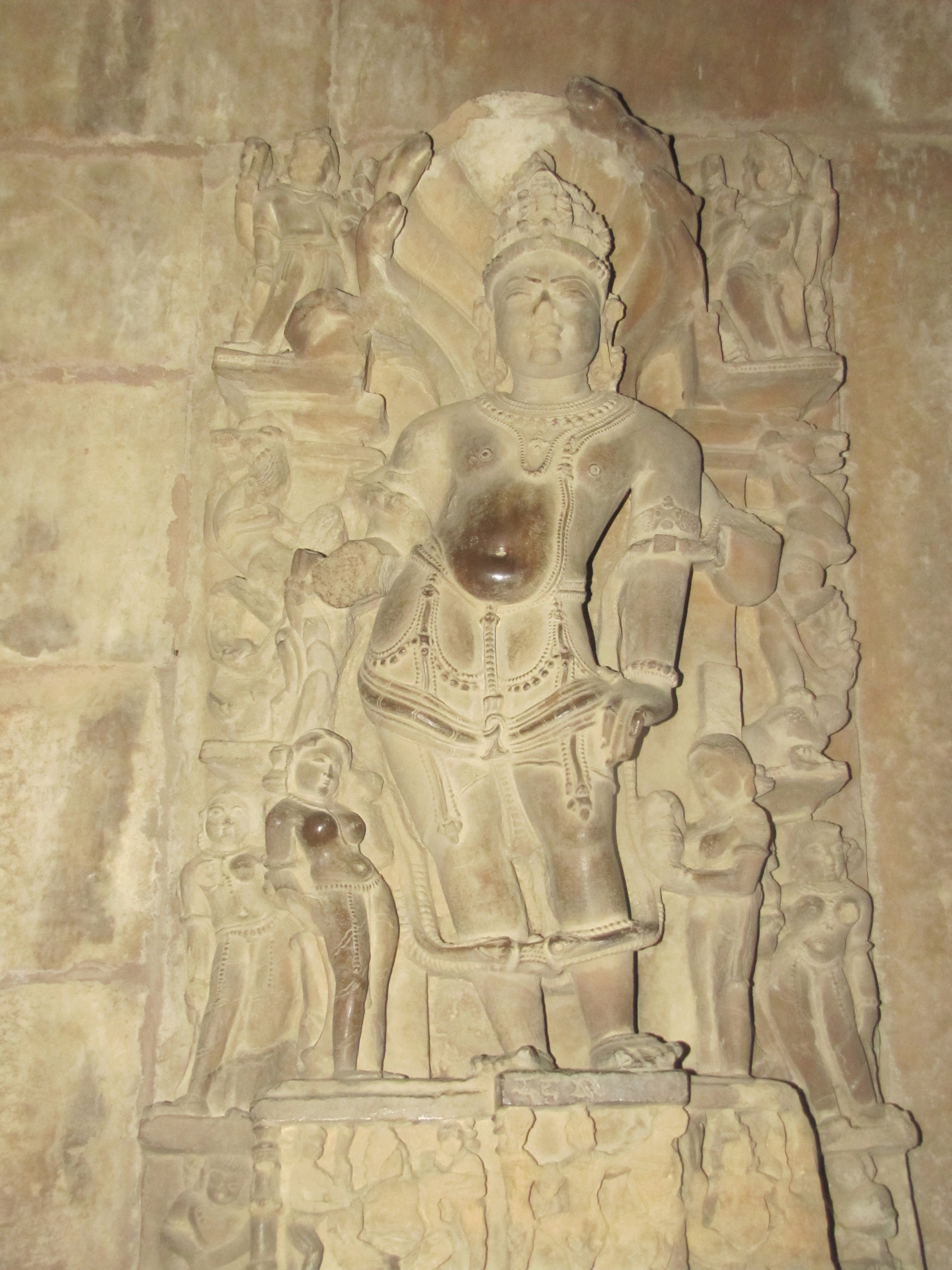
Lakshman Temple, Khajuraho, India

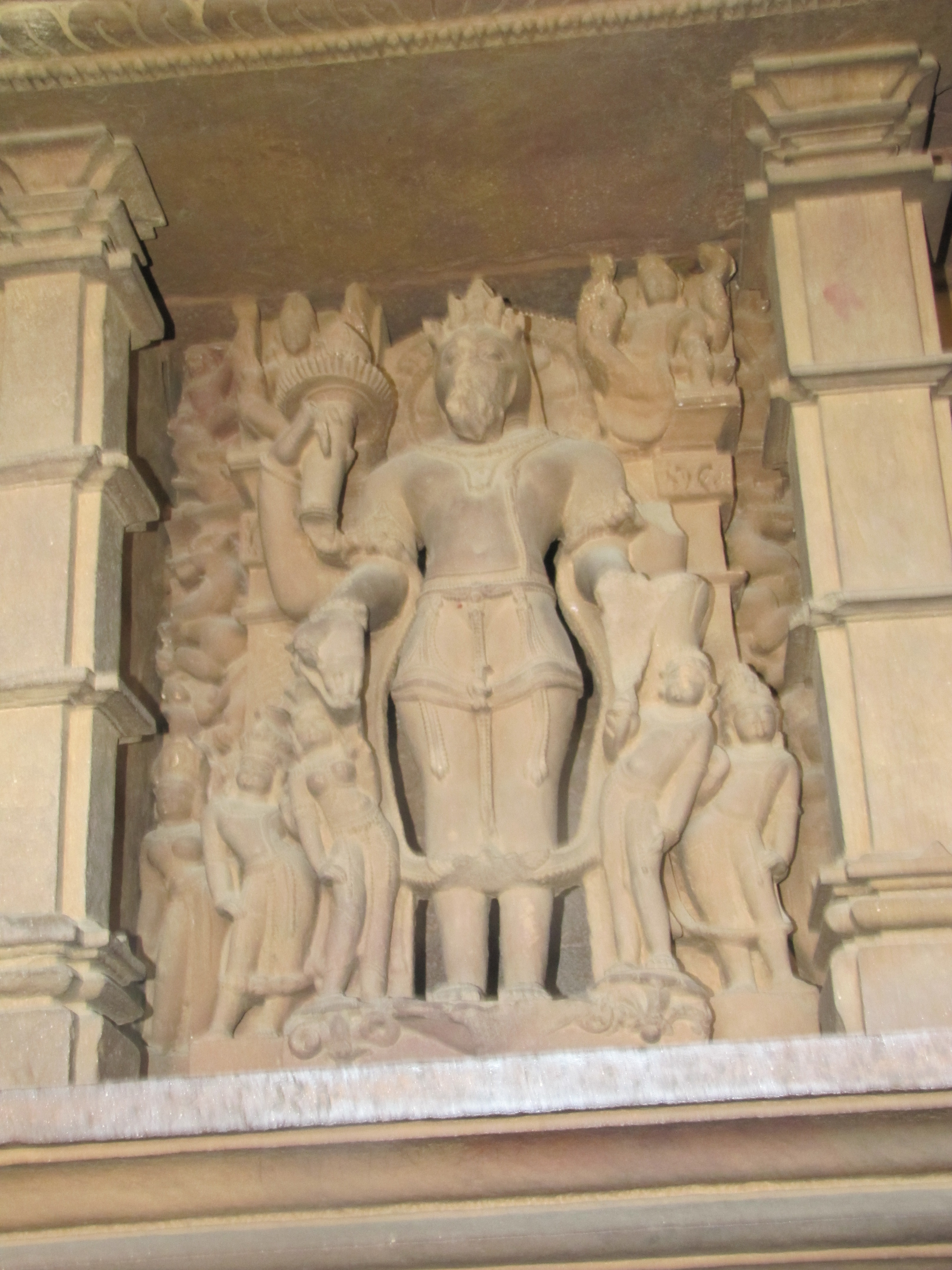
Hayagriva sculpture (inside temple sanctum), Lakshman Temple, Khajuraho, India

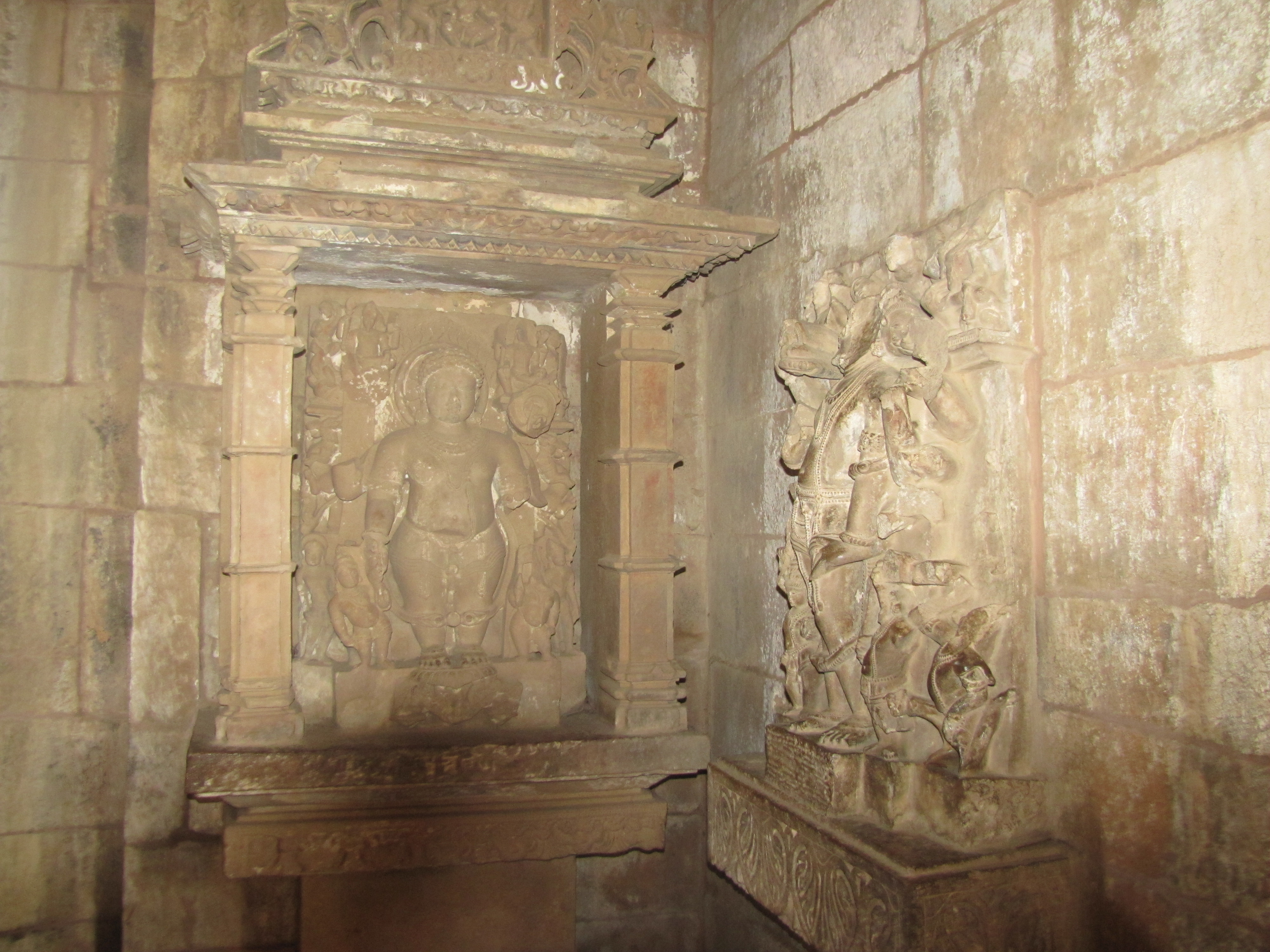
Vamana sculpture (inside temple sanctum), Lakshman Temple, Khajuraho, India

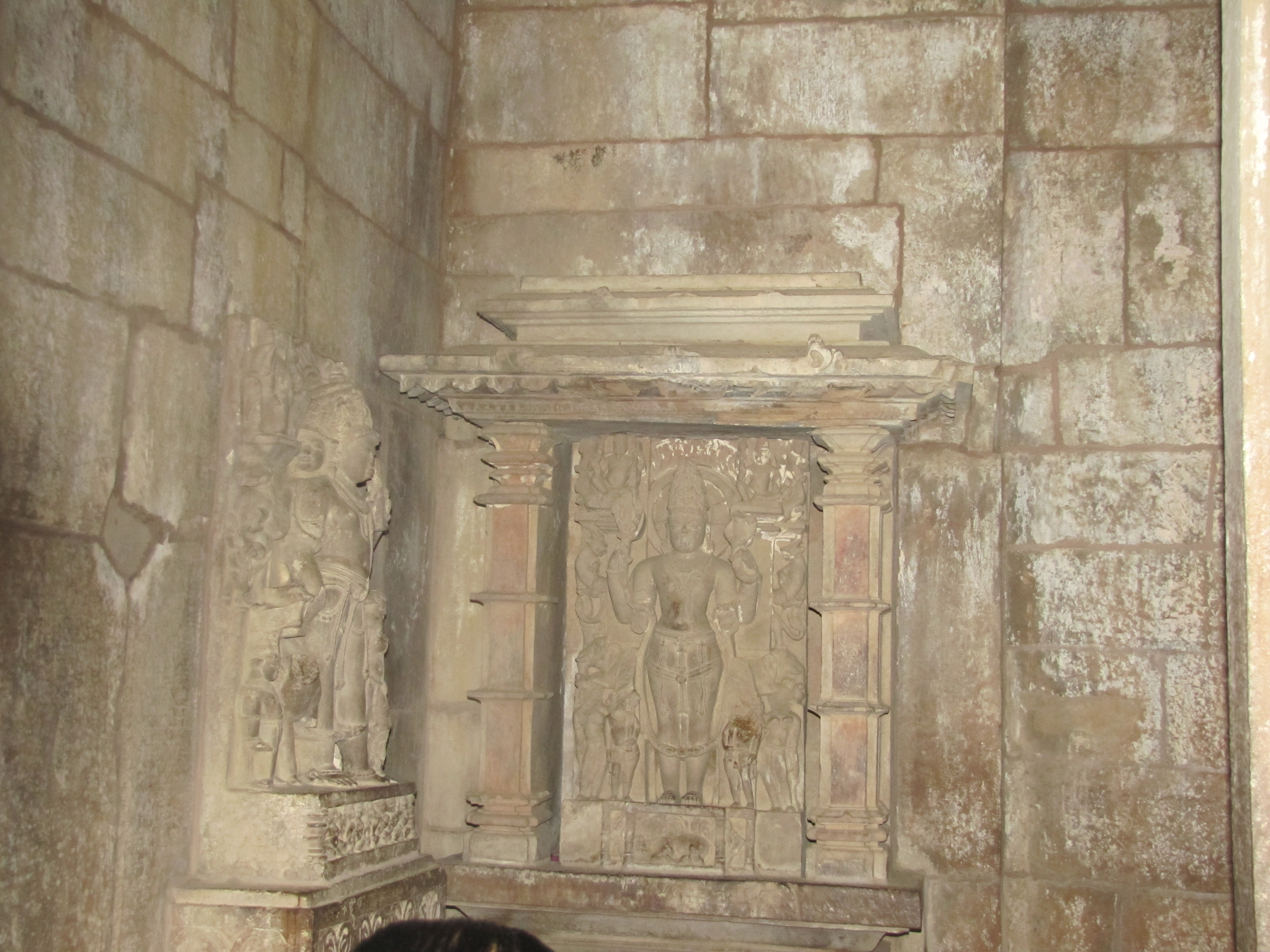
Shiva and Brahma sculpture (inside temple sanctum), Lakshman Temple, Khajuraho, India
