= Rath =

Rath may refer to:

== Places ==
=== Ireland ===
- Ráth Cairn, village in County Meath
- Rath, County Clare, a civil parish in County Clare
- Rath, County Offaly, a village in south-west Offaly
- Rath, County Tipperary, a townland in County Tipperary
- Two different townlands in County Westmeath
  - Rath, Kilkenny West, a townland in Kilkenny West (civil parish)
  - Rath, Street, a townland in Street, County Westmeath (civil parish)

=== Other countries ===
- Mount Rath, Antarctica
- Düsseldorf-Rath, Germany
- Rath, India, a town in Uttar Pradesh

== People ==
- Rath (surname)
- Rath (Odia surname) a form of Rathi, a general surname also used by Oriya/Utkal Brahmins from the Indian state of Orissa
- Rath Sarem, Cambodian politician

== Businesses and organizations ==
- Rath Packing Company, a defunct meat packer formerly located in Waterloo, Iowa
- Thai Rath, national Thai-language daily newspaper published in Bangkok
- Musée Rath, art museum in Geneva

== Fictional uses ==
- Rath block, a block of three Magic: The Gathering game expansions
- Rath, a character in Ben 10
- Rath, a character in the Mummies Alive! TV series
- Immanuel Rath, leading character in the 1930 film The Blue Angel and the 1959 remake
- Rath, a creation of Lewis Carroll in Jabberwocky
- Rath Illuser, character in the manga Dragon Knights

== Other uses ==
- Rath (mythology), an epithet of Etruscan god Śuri
- Rath tribe, a Rajput ethnic group from northern India
- Ráth (anglicised rath), Irish for ringfort
- Rathi cattle, or Rath, a breed of zebu cattle

== See also ==
- Wrath (disambiguation)
- Rath House, Chicago, Illinois
- Ballyfounder Rath, a ringfort situated in County Down, Northern Ireland
- Ratha, Indo-Iranian term for spoked-wheel chariot or cart of antiquity
  - Ratha-Yatra, a public procession in a chariot
  - Ratha (architecture), in Indian architecture
