= Adinatha temple, Khajuraho =

Jain temple in Madhya Pradesh, India

Adinatha temple
- आदिनाथ मन्दिर
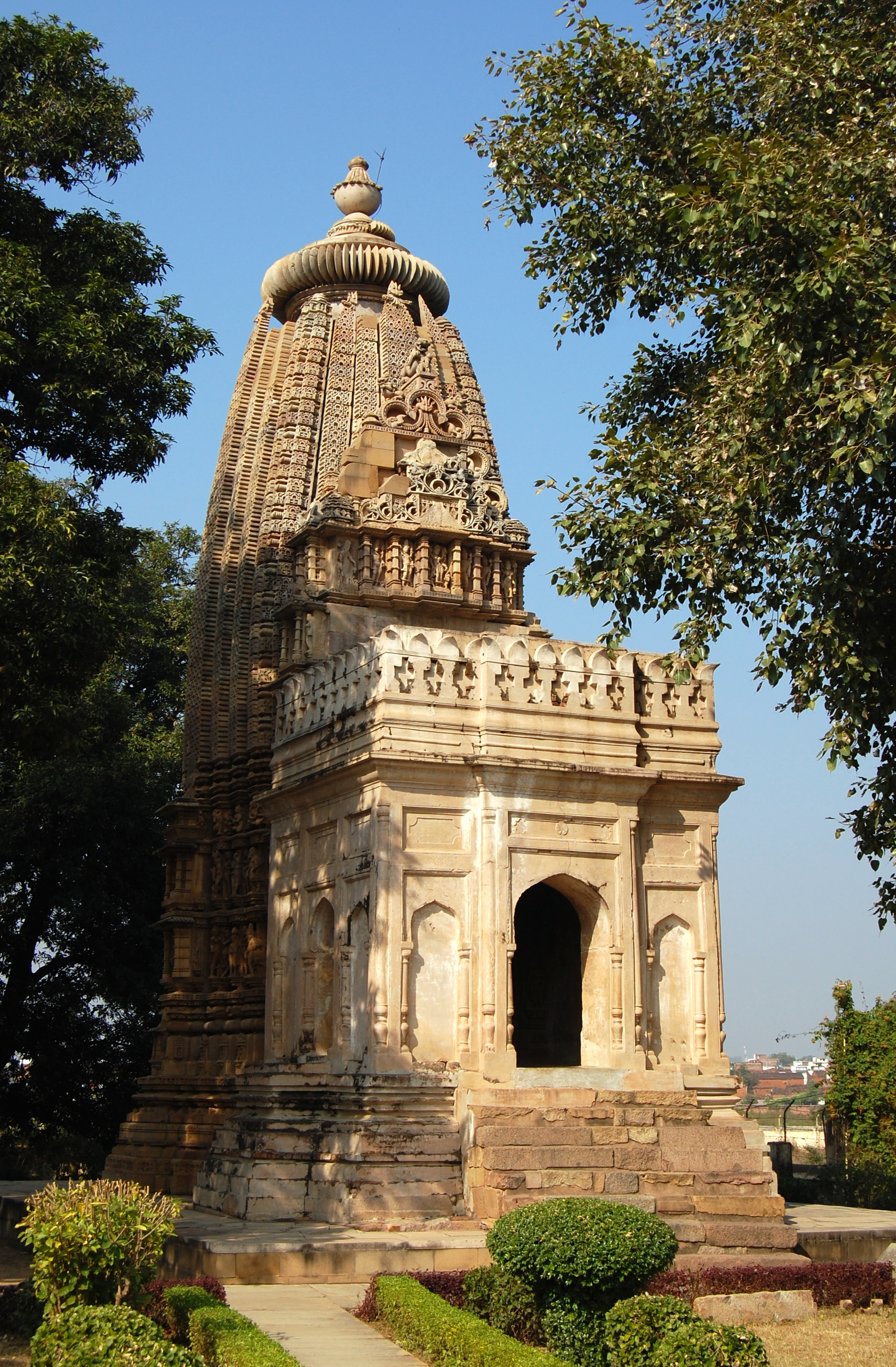

- Location in Madhya Pradesh, India Adinatha temple, Khajuraho (India)

Religion
- Affiliation: Jainism
- District: Chhatarpur
- Deity: Adinatha Rishabhadeva

Location
- Location: Khajuraho
- State: Madhya Pradesh
- Country: India
- Interactive map of Adinatha temple
- Coordinates: 24.845111°N 79.936607°E

Architecture
- Established: 11th century CE
- UNESCO World Heritage Site
- Official name: Khajuraho Group of Monuments
- Criteria: Cultural: (i)(iii)
- Designated: 1986 (session)
- Reference no.: 240

Adinatha temple (IAST: Ādinātha Mandir) is a Digambara Jain temple located at Khajuraho in Madhya Pradesh, India. It is dedicated to Adinatha, although its exterior walls also feature Hindu deities. This particular temple was originally built as a Hindu temple before being subsequently made into a Jain temple. This temple is part of UNESCO World Heritage Site along with other temples in Khajuraho Group of Monuments.

== History ==
The Adinatha temple is dated to the late 11th century CE. It was probably constructed slightly later than the Vamana temple. The architectural features of the Pārśvanātha and Adinātha temples exhibit significant evidence suggesting that these structures were initially constructed as Hindu temples before being subsequently adopted by the Jain community in the 13th century.

In the garbhgraha, there is a black schist (or basalt) statue of Lord Adinath with a three line inscription. It gives the date (samvat 1215 (1158 AD). It gives the name of the donor as Kumarnandi and the sculptor as Ramaveva. It mention that Kumarnandi was the disciple of Bhanukirti, who was disciple of Rajanandi, who was disciple of Ramachandra of Mula Sangha. The inscription includes 3 shardulavikridita verses in literary Sanskrit.

The temple has been classified as a Monument of National Importance by the Archaeological Survey of India.

== Architecture ==
The plan and design of the Adinatha temple is similar to that of the Vamana temple. There are only a few differences between the two temples. For example, the top row of the outer wall of the Adinatha temple depicts a flying vidyadhara, while that of the Vamana temple shows diamond-shaped decorations. The curvilinear tower of the Adinatha temple is of better proportions than that of the Vamana temple. This, combined with a somewhat more evolved sculptural style, suggests that the Adinatha temple was constructed after the Vamana temple.

Only two major parts of the temple now survive: the vestibule and the sanctum. The roof of the vestibule is particularly remarkable for its elegant design.

== Sculptures ==
The exterior walls of the temple have three bands of sculptures featuring surasundaris (graceful women), flying vidyadhara couples, vyalas (mythical lion-like being), and a dancer with musicians. Despite the shrine's Jain affiliation, the external walls also feature carvings of the Hindu deities. The niches feature sculptures of the Jain Yakshinis: Ambika, Chakreshvari, and Padmavati.

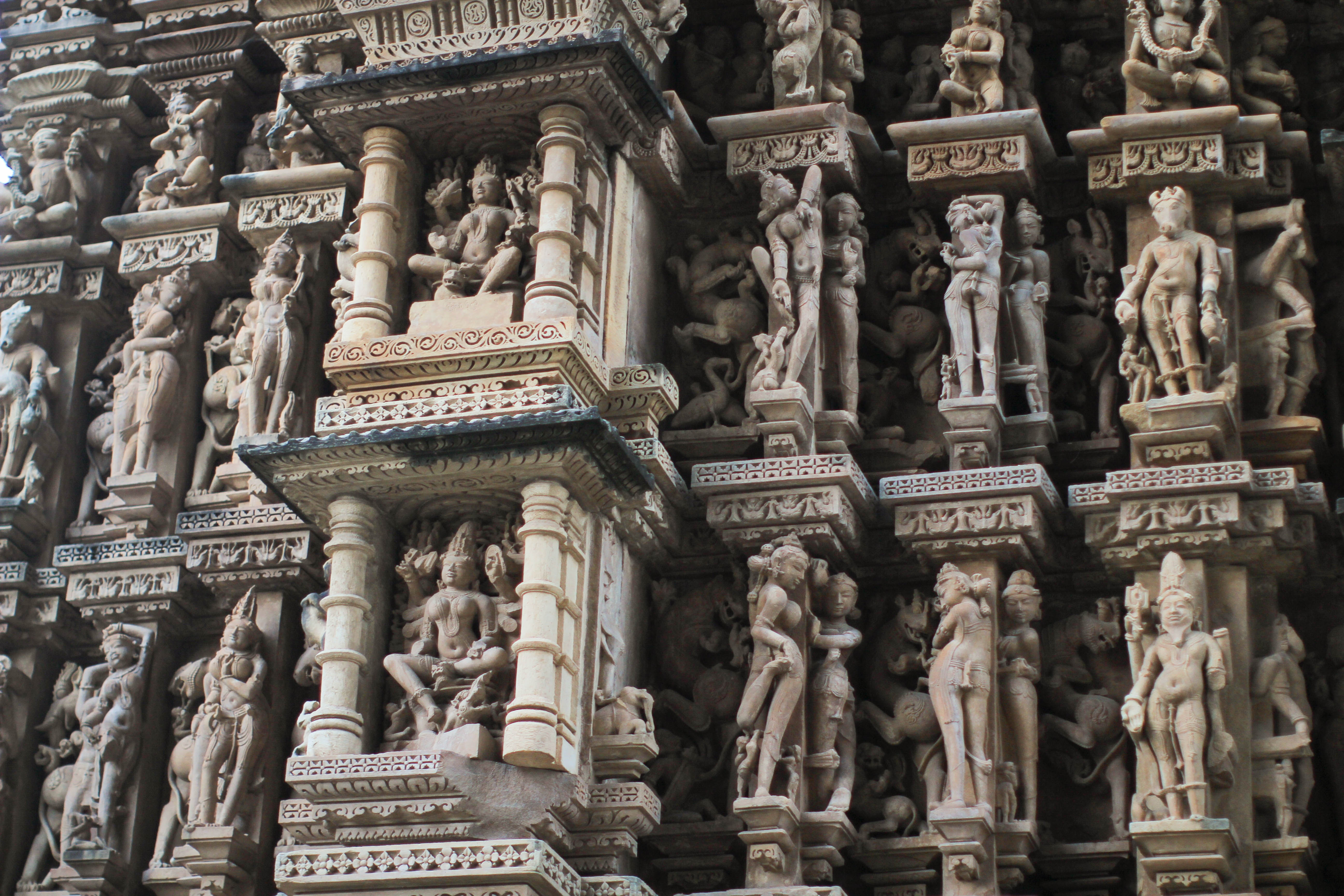
Adinatha temple sculptures

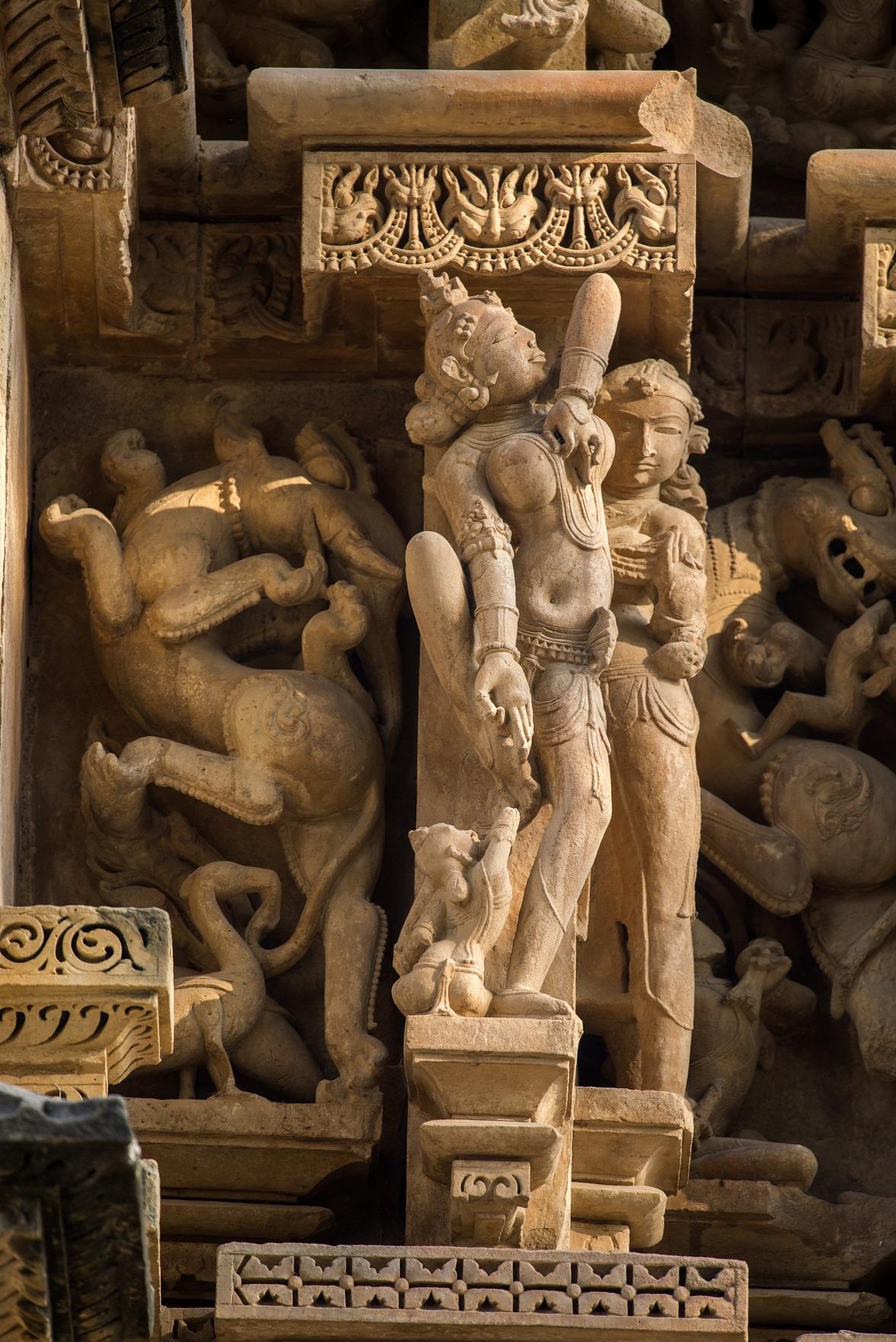
Close-up of a sculpture

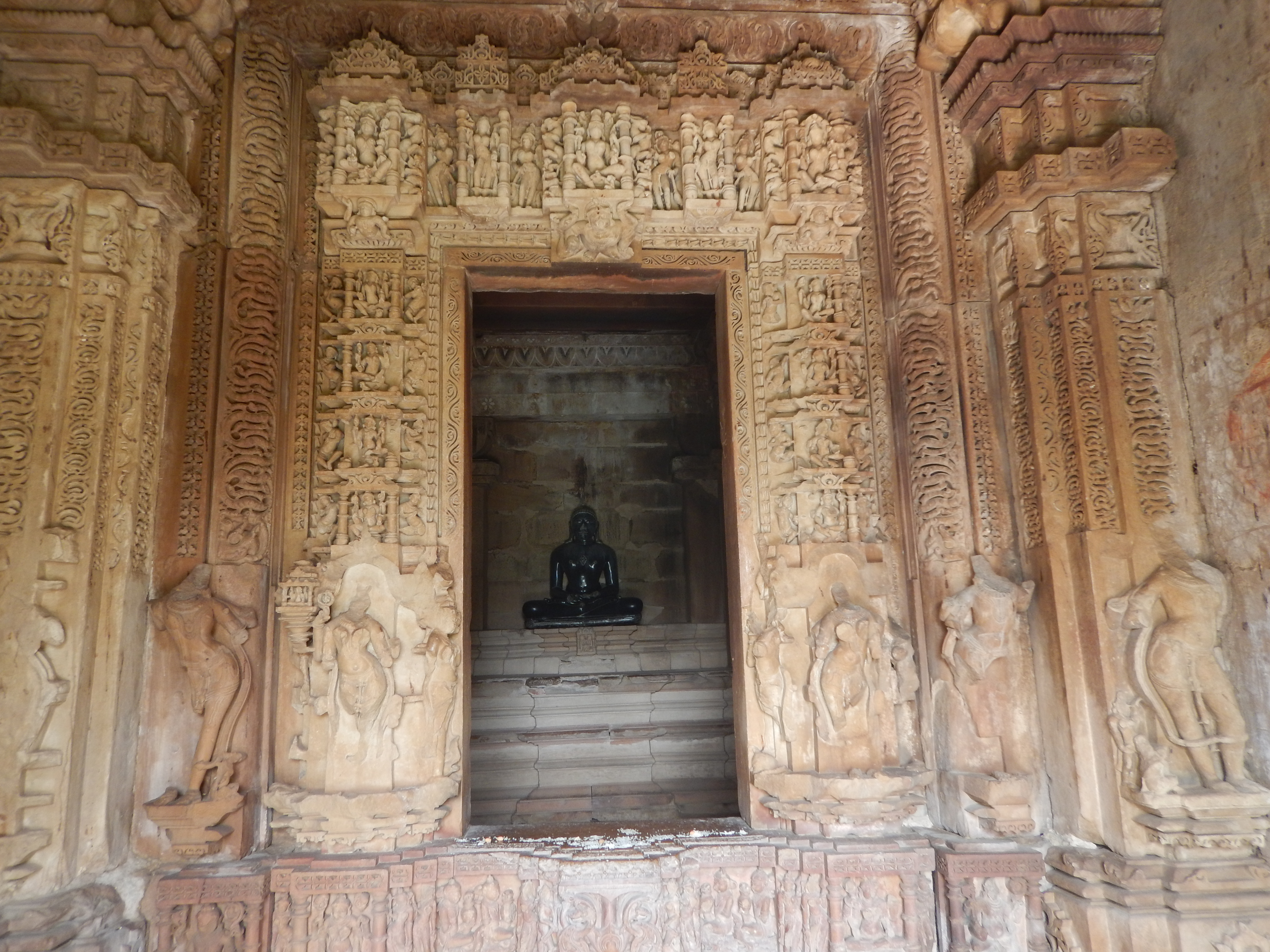
Chandela-era statue of Adinatha in the sanctum

One sculpture found at the temple shows a sitting Adinatha with an ushnisha on his head. It features a dharmachakra with a small bull figure. The right side of the seat has the figure of a pot-bellied yaksha with a cup and a moneybag in his hands. The left side has the figure of the yakshini Chakreshvari sitting on a Garuda. She has four arms; each of the two upper arms hold a chakra.

Another sculpture with similar iconography also features a yaksha, a yakshini, and a bull with a dharmachakra. The Adinatha is shown sitting in padmasana pose on a cushioned seat with lotuses and diamond motifs.
