= Rath (surname) =

Rath is a surname. Notable people with the surname include:

- Alan Rath (born 1959), American electronic, kinetic, and robotic sculptor
- Ari Rath (1925–2017), Austrian-Israeli journalist and write
- Biswa Kalyan Rath (born 1989), Indian stand-up comic and writer
- Billy Rath (1948–2014), American musician
- Bogdan Rath (born 1972), Romanian and later Italian Olympic water polo player
- Claudia Rath (born 1986), German heptathlon athlete
- Daniela Rath (born 1977), German high jumper
- David Rath (born 1965), former Minister of Health for the Czech Republic
- Edward C. Rath (died 1969), first County Executive of Erie County, New York
- Elfriede Moser-Rath (1926–1993), Austrian ethnologist
- Ernst vom Rath (1909–1938), German diplomat killed in Paris
- Fred Rath, Sr. (born 1943), American baseball pitcher
- Fred Rath, Jr. (born 1973), American baseball pitcher, son of Fred Rath, Sr.
- Fred J. Rath (1888–1968), New York state senator
- Gerhard vom Rath (1830–1888), German mineralogist
- Gary Rath (born 1973), American left-handed baseball pitcher
- Henry Coyle Rath (1898–1918), World War I flying ace credited with twelve aerial victories
- Jesse Rath (born 1989), Canadian actor
- Lukas Rath (born 1992), Austrian association football player
- Mac Rath, nickname of Giric (c.832–889), king of the Picts or of Alba
- Marcel Rath (born 1975), German football player
- Marius Rath (born 1970), Norwegian Olympic ice hockey player
- Mary Lou Rath, American politician, state senator in New York
- Matthias Rath (1955–2026), controversial German physician and vitamin entrepreneur
- Meaghan Rath (born 1986), Canadian film and television actress
- Morrie Rath (Maurice Rath) (1886–1945), American second base baseball player
- Rachel Rath (born 1976), Irish actress
- Ramakanta Rath (born 1934), Indian poet, wrote in the Oriya language
- Spyros Rath (died 1983), Greek politician, mayor of Corfu
- Srinivas Rath, Indian poet and professor of literature, wrote in Sanskrit
- Thomas Rath (born 1970), German football (soccer) midfielder
- Thomas D. Rath, American lawyer, former Attorney General of New Hampshire
- Tom Rath, American author
- Ulrik Rath (born 1946), Danish chess master
- Walther vom Rath (1857-1940), German, scientist, entrepreneur and politician
- Wilhelm von Rath (1585–1641), Saxon cavalry officer
- Wilhelm Rath (1897-1973), German writer and anthroposophist

== See also ==
- Rath (Oriya surname)
- Vom Rath
