= Latina (architecture) =

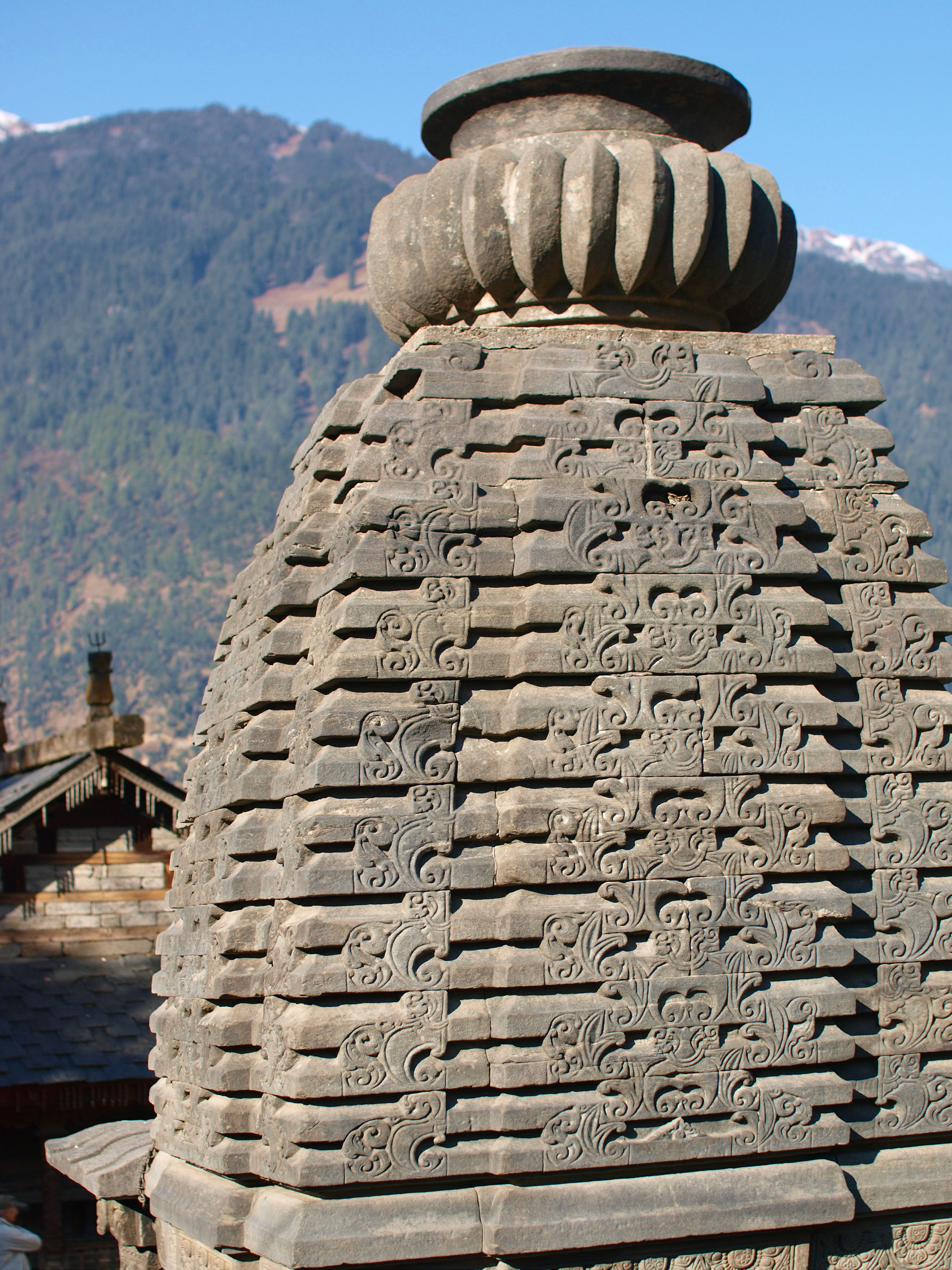
Latina shikhara at Manali, Himachal Pradesh, with a ratha in the centre of each face

In Hindu temple architecture, Latina or Rekha Prasad is the most common type of northern Indian shikhara (tower or spire on top of a shrine), whose form is a single slightly curved tower with four sides of equal length, thus square in plan. The sides may be broken by slight projections running up the tower, called rathas, and there is often considerable decoration, especially at the corners, where some division into horizontal "storeys" may be seen. The tower is traditionally built by superimposing horizontal slabs of stone. The two variant and more elaborate types of northern Indian towers are the Sekhari and the Bhumija, both based on the Latina plan.
