= Wrath (disambiguation) =

Wrath or anger, usually associated with violence, violent reaction or acting out.

Wrath may also refer to:

== Music ==
- Wrath Records, UK independent record label
- Wrath (band), an American progressive thrash metal band
- Wrath (Iris album), 2005
- Wrath (Lamb of God album), 2009
- "Wrath", a song by Bury Tomorrow from the album The Seventh Sun
- "Wrath", a song by The Ghost Inside from the album Searching for Solace
- "Wrath", a song by Lorna Shore from the album Pain Remains
- "Wrath", a song by War of Ages from the album Void
- "The Wrath", a song by Vader from the album De Profundis

== Film and television ==
- Wrath (1917 film), an American silent drama film
- Wrath (2011 film), an Australian horror film written and directed by Jonathan N. Dixon
- The Wrath, a 2018 South Korean horror film
- "Wrath" (Fear the Walking Dead), a television episode
- "Wrath" (The Walking Dead), a television episode
- "Wrath", an episode of Law & Order: Special Victims Unit (season 3)

== Other entertainment ==
- Wrath (comics), two supervillains in DC Comics
- Wrath, a character in the Fullmetal Alchemist anime and manga
- Wrath: Aeon of Ruin, a 2019 video game
- Bryan Clark (born 1964), wrestler who used the ring name Wrath

== Other ==
- Wrath in Christianity, one of the seven deadly sins
- Greater Wrath 1714–21 and Lesser Wrath 1741–43, Russian occupation of Eastern part of Sweden i.e. Finland
- Western Rail Approach to Heathrow

== See also ==
- - includes many "Wrath of ... " titles
- Cape Wrath
- Mass destruction (disambiguation)
- Rage (disambiguation)
  - Outrage (disambiguation)
  - Rage as an emotion
  - Fury (disambiguation)
- Rath (disambiguation)
- Wraith (disambiguation)
