= Wraith =

Wraith is one of several traditional terms for a ghost or spirit. Wraith, Wraiths, or The Wraith may also refer to:

== Fictional elements ==
=== Characters ===
==== Marvel Comics ====
- Wraith (Hector Rendoza), a member of the X-Men
- John Wraith, an X-Men supporting character who goes by the alias of Kestrel
- Wraith (Brian DeWolff), an adversary of Spider-Man
- Wraith (Zak-Del)
- Wraith (Yuri Watanabe), a rival and ally of Spider-Man
- Wraith (Amalgam Comics), character from JLX

==== Other characters ====
- Wraith (G.I. Joe), a Cobra mercenary in G.I. Joe: America's Elite
- Wraith (Image Comics), a comic book superhero
- The Wraith (Slam Masters)
- The Wraith (Transformers)
- Wraith, a playable character in the game Apex Legends
- The Wraith, a playable killer in the game Dead by Daylight
- Wraith, a type of ghost in the game Phasmophobia (video game)
- Wraith, a fictional character from Disney's Mighty Ducks
- The Wraith, an alias of Inej Ghafa in the Six of Crows Duology
- Ringwraiths, or Nazgûl in Tolkien's legendarium

=== Races ===
- Wraith (Dungeons & Dragons), a type of undead in Dungeons & Dragons
- Wraith (Stargate), an alien race in Stargate Atlantis
- Wraith, a species in the Star Trek: Enterprise episode "Rogue Planet"
- Wraith, a type of monster in Evolve
- Wraith, a type of ghost in Phasmophobia (video game)

=== Vehicles ===
- Wraith Squadron, a starfighter squadron in the Star Wars universe
- Type-26 Assault Gun Carriage, Wraith, a plasma mortar tank used by the "Covenant" in Halo
- Wraith, a Terran air unit in StarCraft
- Rolls-Royce Wraith (2013), a British luxury car model

== Film ==
- The Wraith, a 1986 movie starring Charlie Sheen
- The Wraith (1957 film), an Australian television film

== Music ==
- The Wraith: Shangri-La, a 2002 album by Insane Clown Posse
- The Wraith: Hell's Pit, a 2004 album by Insane Clown Posse
- The Wraith: Remix Albums, a 2006 album by Insane Clown Posse
- The Wraith, a 2020 album by Toronto electronic music producer Roam
- "Wraith" (song), 2013, by Peace from In Love
- "Wraith", a song by T.I. from his 2018 album Dime Trap
- "Wraith", a song by Cephalic Carnage from the 2005 album Anomalies

== Vehicles ==
- Rolls-Royce Wraith (1938), an automobile built by Rolls-Royce from 1938 to 1939
- Rolls-Royce Wraith (2013), an automobile built by Rolls-Royce from 2013 to 2022
- B120 Wraith, a motorcycle built by the Confederate Motor Company

== Other uses ==
- Wraith: The Oblivion, a role-playing game
- Wraith: Welcome to Christmasland, a comic book series by Joe Hill
- AMD Wraith, a line of CPU coolers
- The Wraith, a sophomore album from Toronto music producer Roam

== People with the surname ==
- Geoff Wraith (1946–2019), English rugby league footballer
- Ronald Wraith (1908–?), British scholar
- Tom Wraith (1890–1970), Australian rules footballer and umpire

== See also ==
- Ghosts in European culture
- List of comic characters named Wraith
- Wrath (disambiguation)
- Wreath
