= Urushringa =

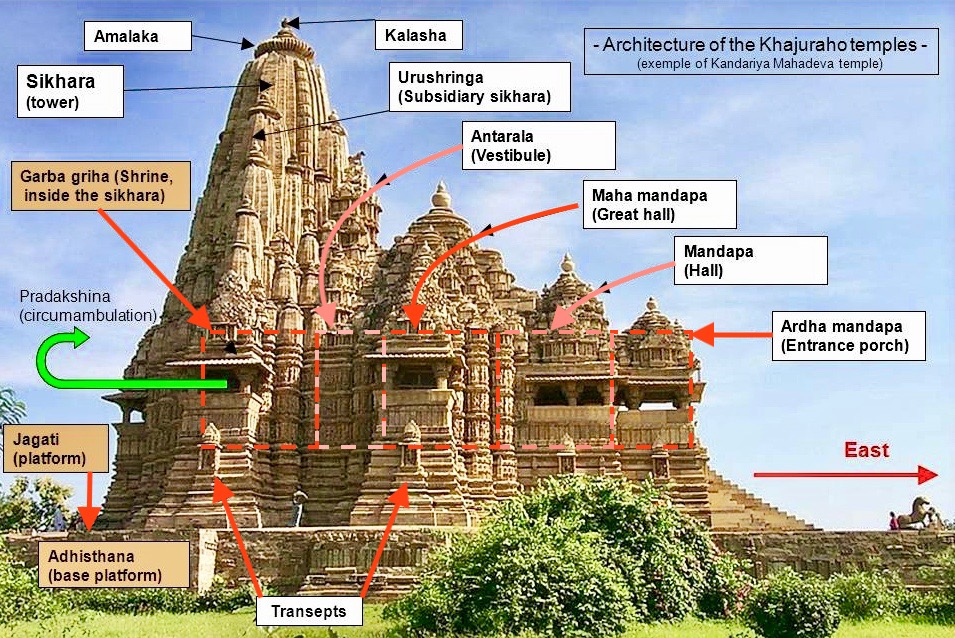
Kandariya Mahadeva Temple, Khajuraho, with 84 urushringa around the shikhara

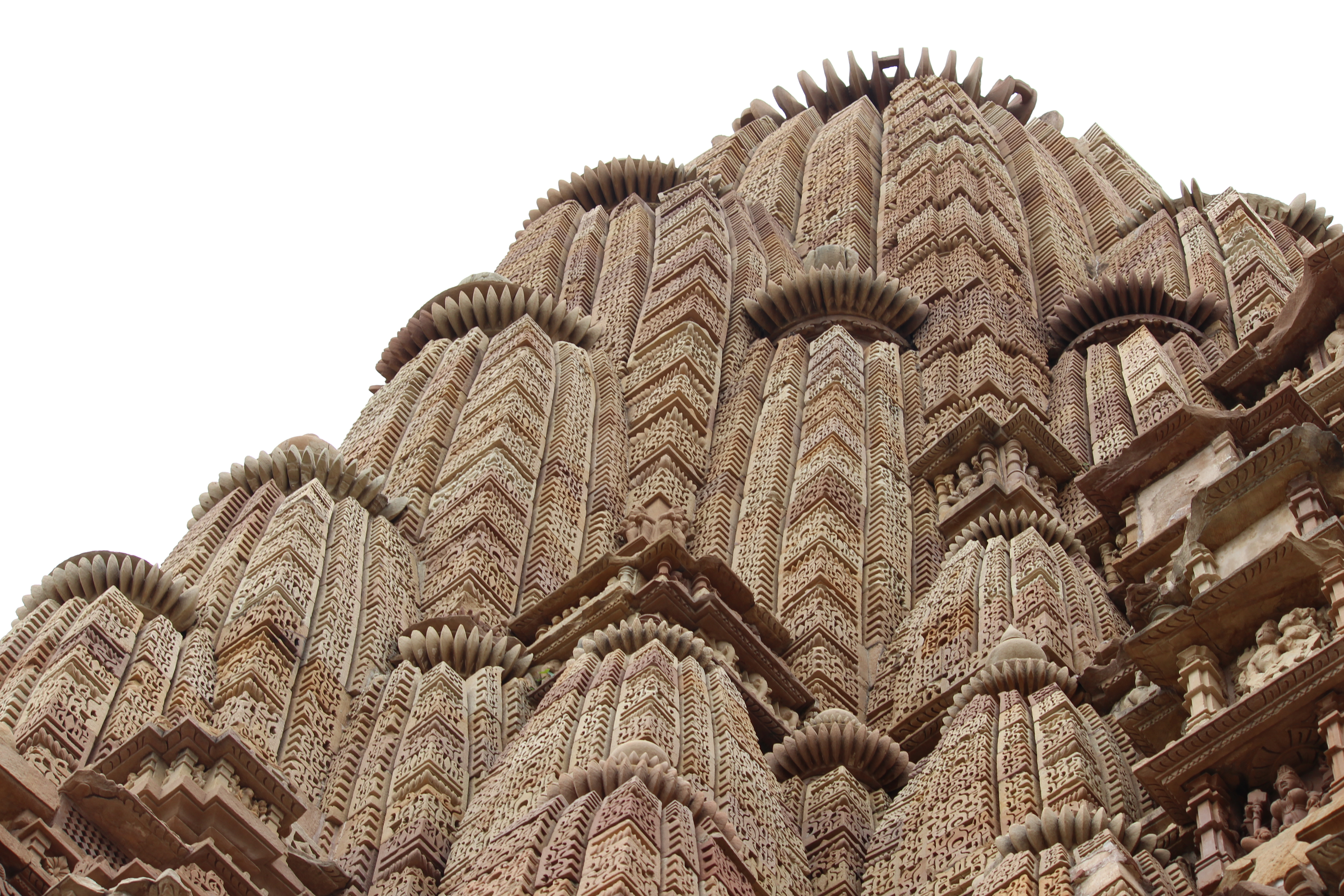
Detail of the same temple

Urushringa (Sanskrit: उरुशृङ्ग, lit. 'having high peak', IAST: uruśṛṅga) is a subsidiary tower springing from the sides of the main shikhara tower in the Hindu temple architecture of northern India.

== Overview ==
The urushringa is smaller and narrower than the shikhara, and "engaged" or connected to it where they meet, except right at the top. It strengthens the feeling of height given by the temple, and may give some structural support by acting like a buttress, as well as adding to the visual symbolism of the temple as a sacred mountain.

They often reflect the complex shape of the sanctuary structure at ground level, following the ratha projections up into the shikhara. The style of shikhara with urushringas is known as sekhari. Many of the temples in the famous Khajuraho Group of Monuments have sekhari towers, though others do not. On the Kandariya Mahadeva Temple there are 84 urushringas around the shikhara. The urushringa echoes the form of the main shikhara, and often has its own amalaka and kalasha at the top, as in the Kandariya Mahadeva Temple.
