= Shikhara =

Tower or spire in Indian temple architecture

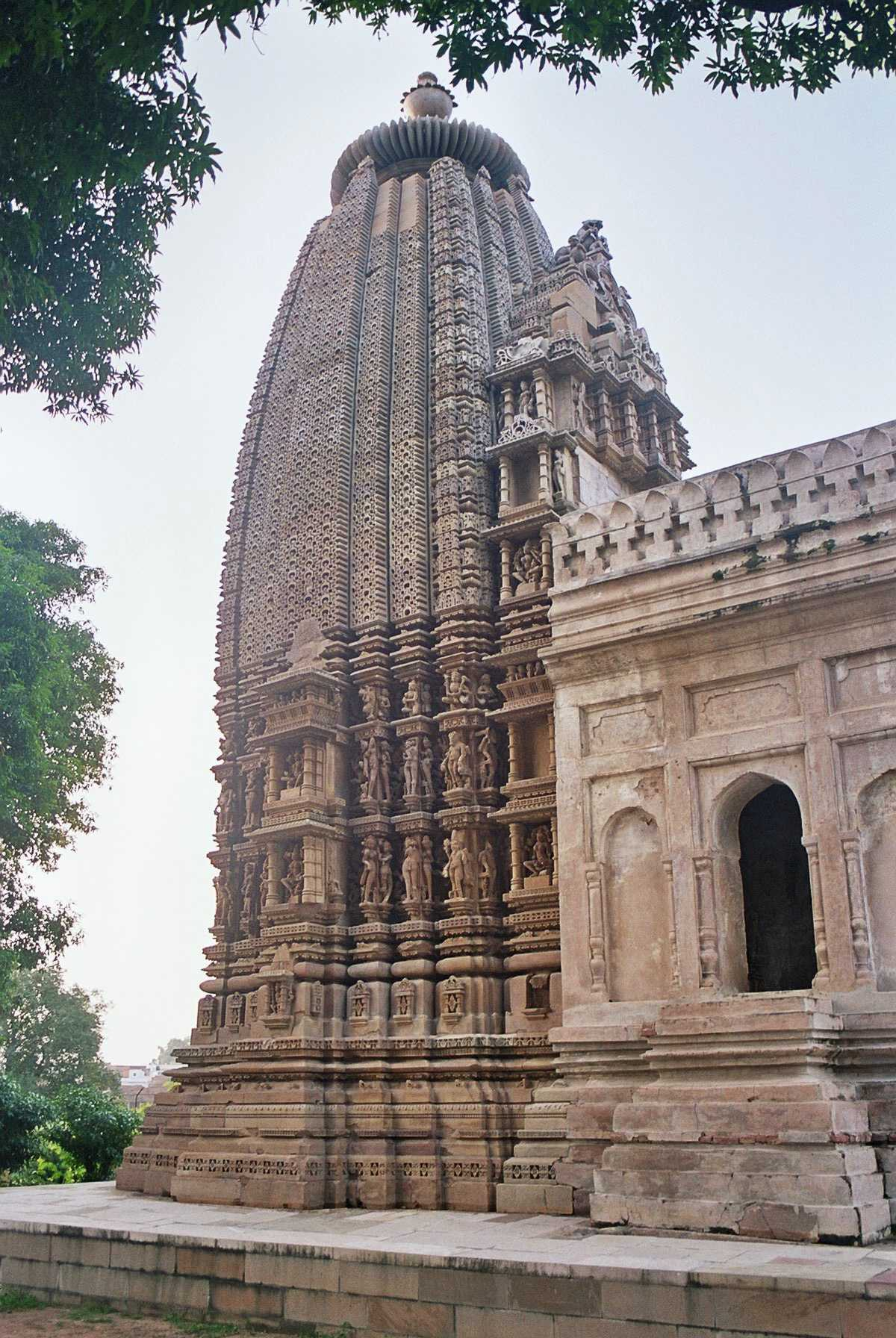
Latina in Khajuraho

Shikhara (Sanskrit: शिखर, IAST: Śikhara), a Sanskrit word translating literally to "mountain peak", refers to the rising tower in the Hindu temple architecture of North India, and also often used in Jain temples. A shikhara over the garbhagriha chamber where the presiding deity is enshrined is the most prominent and visible part of a Hindu temple of North India.

In South India, the equivalent term is vimana; unlike the shikhara, this refers to the whole building, including the sanctum beneath. In the south, shikhara is a term for the top stage of the vimana only, which is usually a dome capped with a finial; this article is concerned with the northern form. The southern vimana is not to be confused with the elaborate gateway-towers of south Indian temples, called gopuram, which are often taller and more prominent features in large temples.

It is argued that stylistic aspects seen on Buddhist architecture like the stupa may have been influenced by the shikhara, a stylistic element which in some regions evolved to the pagoda.

== Forms ==
Shikhara can be classified into three main forms:

- Latina. The latina shikhara has four faces, which may include projections or ratha within each face. All the elements run smoothly up the face in a curve. They are also sometimes called "homogeneous" shikhara, as opposed to the next two types, which may be called "heterogeneous". It is the most common form of a shikara.
- Sekhari. The sekhari shape has added engaged (attached) sub-spires or spirelets called urushringa, echoing the main shape. These may run up most of the face. There may be more than one size of these, sometimes called secondary and tertiary. Tertiary spirelets are typically near the ends of the face or on the corners.
- Bhumija. The tower has miniature spires, in horizontal and vertical rows, all the way to the top, creating a grid-like effect on each face. The tower is generally less strongly vertical in overall shape, often approaching a pyramidal shape. This shape is mainly found in the northern Deccan and West India.

== History ==
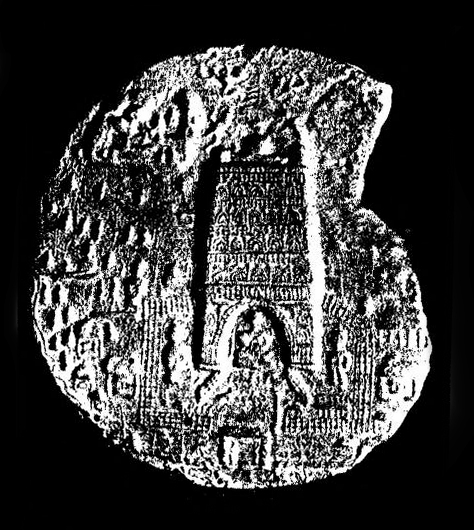
The Mahabodhi Temple in 150–200 CE. Recent images of the plaque

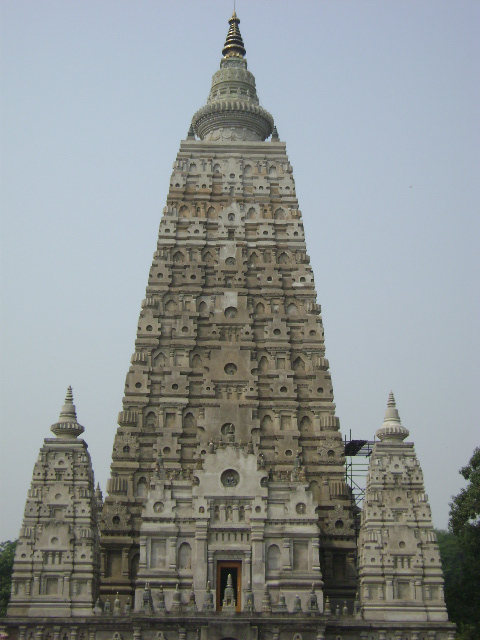
The Mahabodhi Temple: a stepped pyramid with stupa finial on top.

The early history of the Hindu shikhara is unclear, but the Buddhist Mahabodhi Temple at Bodh Gaya has a straight-sided shikhara tower over 55 metres (180 feet) high, with an amalaka near the top. The current structure dates from the Gupta Empire, in the 5th–6th century CE. When the temple acquired its shikhara tower, today considered more characteristic of Hindu temples, is uncertain. However, the current structure of the Mahabodhi Temple may represent a restoration of earlier work of the 2nd or 3rd century CE.

Ernest Havell traced the origin of shikhara to Ancient Mesopotamia and referred to the royal fortress palaces of similar forms depicted in the stele of Naram-Sin. A plaque from Kumrahar dated 150-200 CE, based on its dated Kharoshthi inscriptions and combined finds of Huvishka coins, already shows the Mahabodhi Temple in its current shape with a stepped truncated pyramid and a stupa finial on top, together with devotional images of the Buddha and the elephant-crowned Pillar of Ashoka next to the entrance. It is thought that this shape of a truncated pyramid was derived from the design of the stepped stupas which had developed in Gandhara, as seen in the stupas of Jaulian, with an elongated structure formed of a succession of steps with niches containing Buddha images, alternating with Greco-Roman pillars, and topped by a stupa.

By at least 600 CE in Odisha, and perhaps somewhat later in the Deccan Plateau and West India, the Latina form of the shikhara is well-established, with an amalaka disk-stone at the top, and then a kalasha urn. There is often a sukanasa feature over the entrance door.

The forms with smaller subsidiary spires begin in the 10th century, and from then on tend to predominate. The Khajuraho Group of Monuments has several early forms from early in the century, though Latina ones reappear after about 1050, in examples like the Vamana Temple. The bhumija spire probably first appears around 1000-1025, with other temples begun in the 1050s, such as the Shiv Mandir, Ambarnath.

== Major styles ==
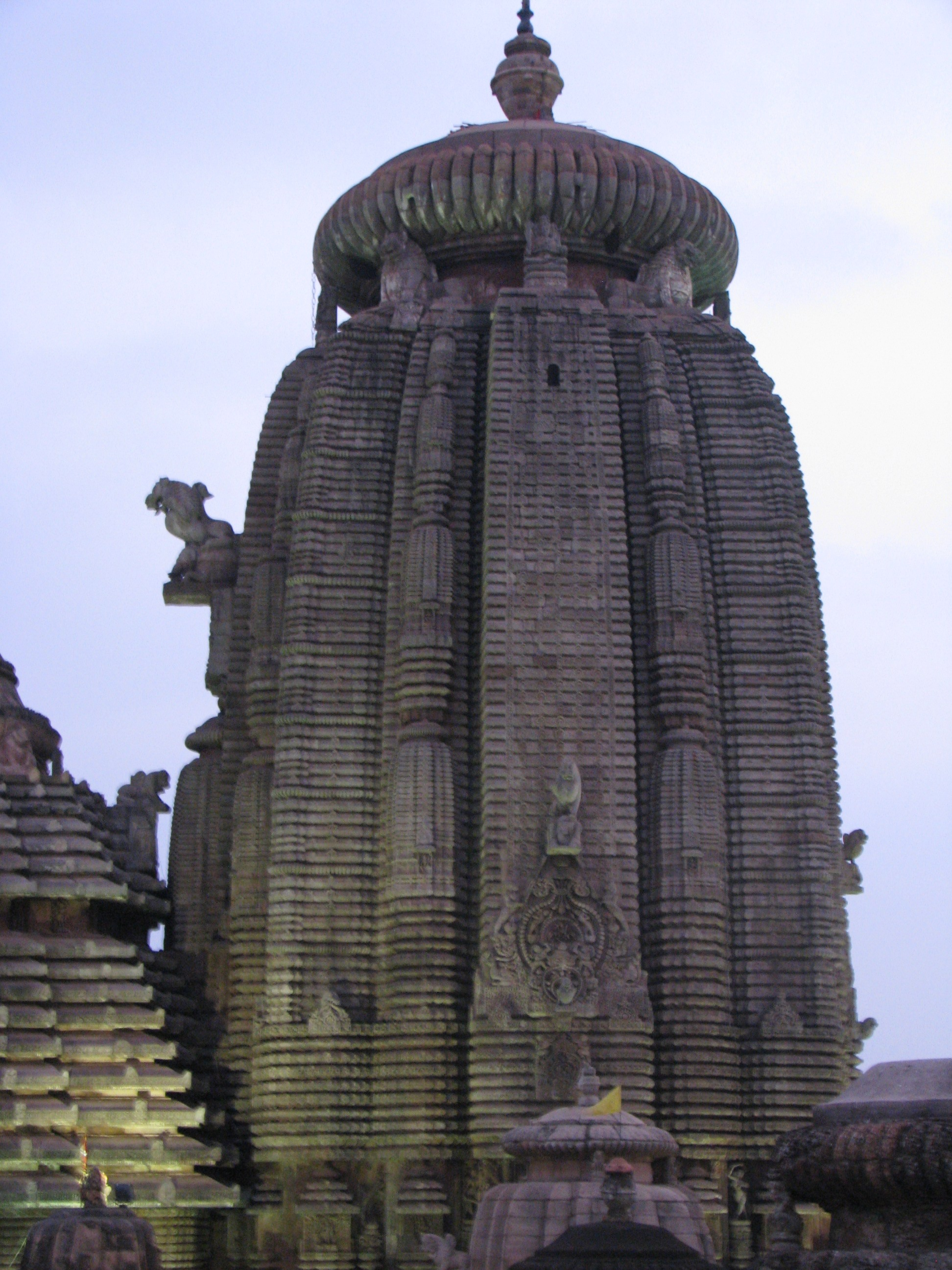
Homogeneous Shikhara (but with rathas) of the Lingaraja Temple in Bhubaneswar

Shikharas form an element in the many styles of Hindu temple architecture, of which the four most common are Nagara, Vesara, Dravidian, and Tirhut.

- The Nagara style is more prevalent in northern India, within which, the shikhara is recognized as a high curved shape. In the north-east, the local term deul or deula is more often used, both for towers and often the whole temple. In Odisha, a Rekha Deula is the sanctum and the tower over it; gandi is also a term for the upper tower only, equating to shikhara. The curve is also very slight until the top, and the amalaka rather large, typically supported by four lion sculptures facing out. Of the many temples in Bhubaneswar, only the Rajarani Temple has significant spirelets.
- The Vesara style, a synthesis of Nagara and Dravidian, is seen in Karnataka and most commonly in Hoysala and later Chalukya temples. In the vesara style, the tower moves towards a lower conical shape, with highly ornate carving.
- The Dravidian style is prevalent in southern India, in which the equivalent of the shikhara is the vimana. The superstructure above the sanctum is typically more like a four-sided pyramid in overall shape, consisting of progressively smaller storeys of pavilions (talas), with a profile that is normally straight than curved. The Dravidian superstructure is generally highly ornate.
- The Tirhut style is prevalent in Mithila region of the Indian subcontinent.

In every style of shikhara/vimana, the structure culminates with a "kalasha", or urn for offerings, or water-pot, at its peak.

The four main styles
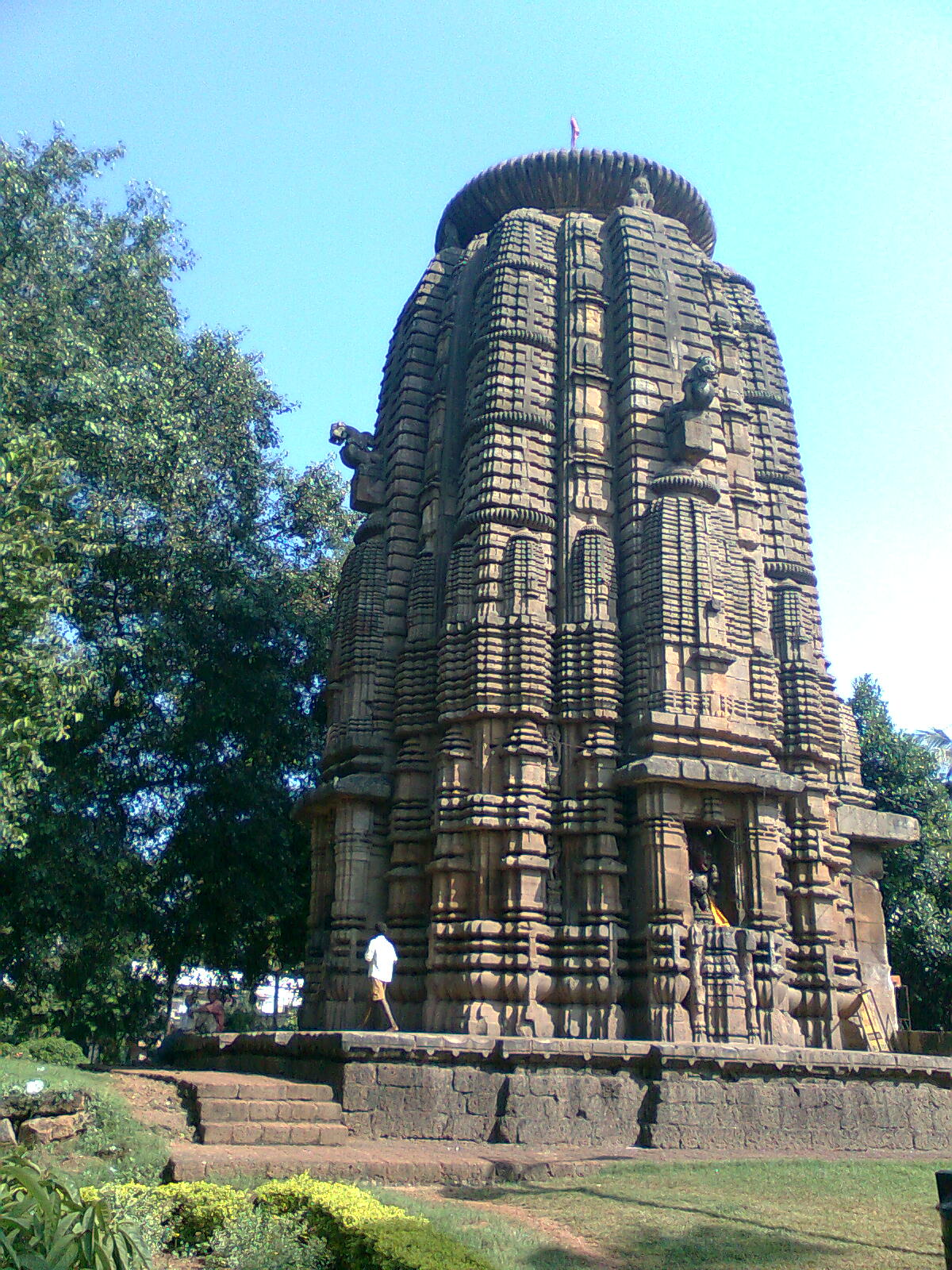
Nagara shikhara of Rameshwar Temple in Bhubaneswar

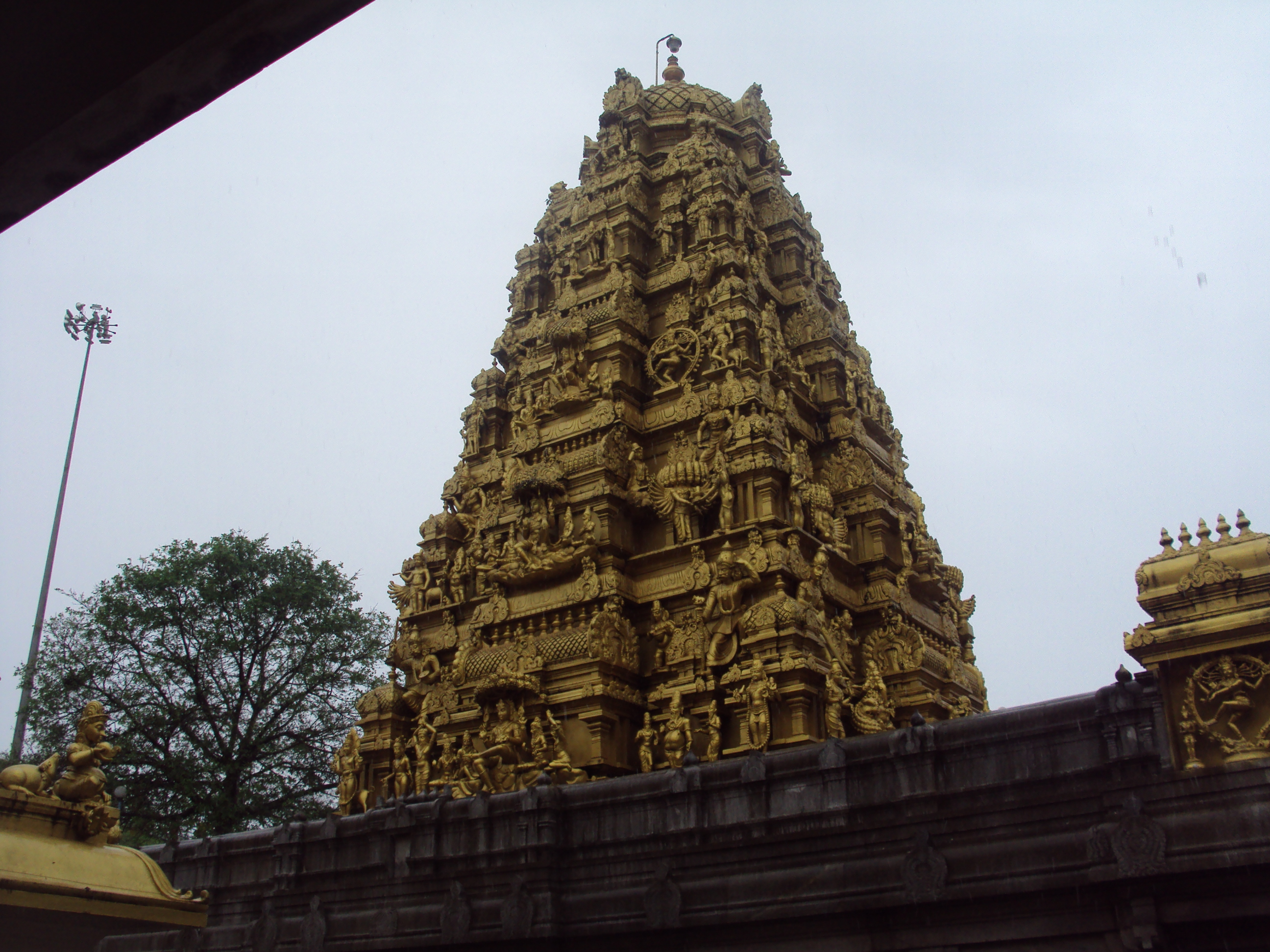
Dravidian vimana of Murudeshwara Temple

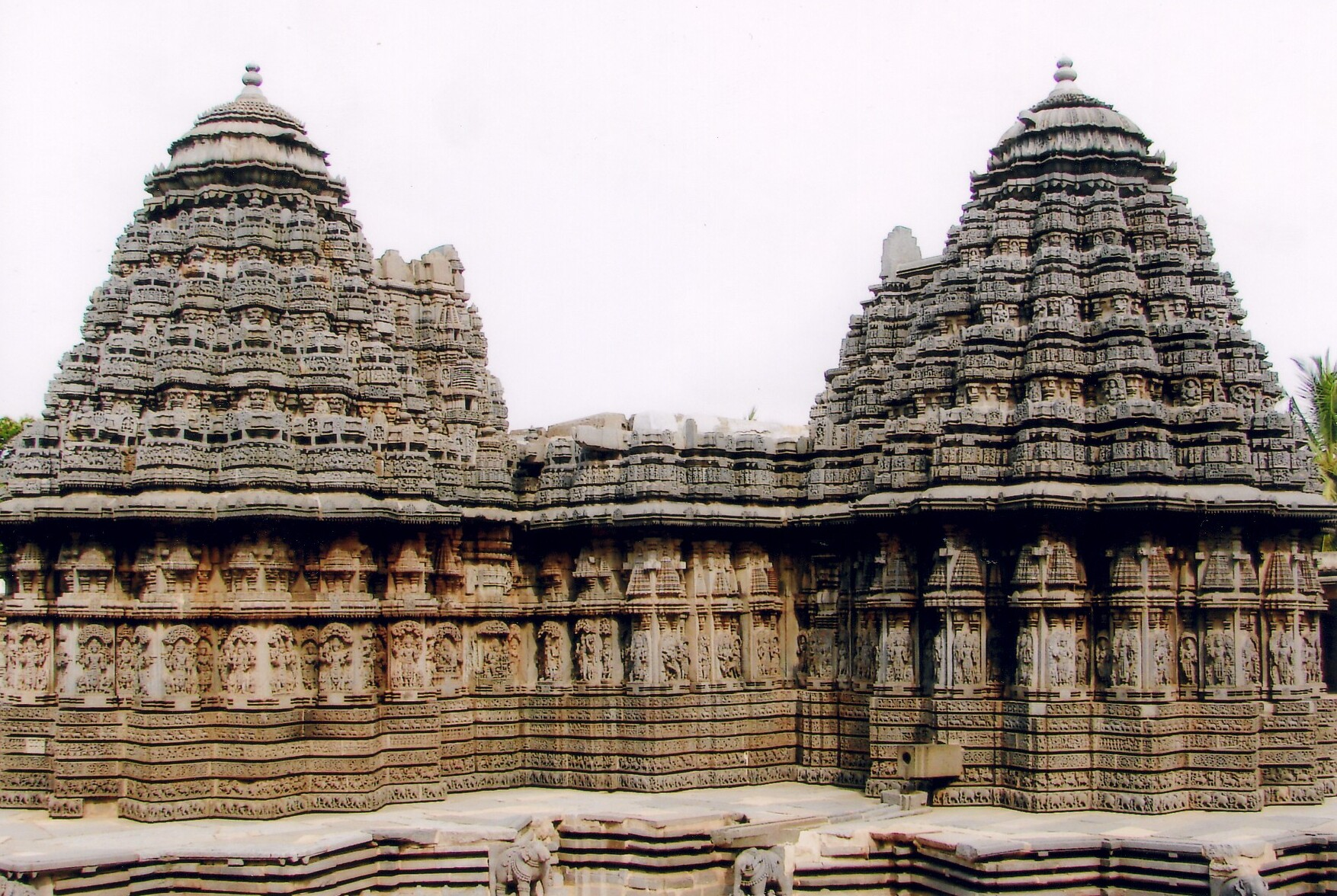
Vesara style of Chennakesava Temple, Somanathapura. Towers are in 16 pointed star plan.

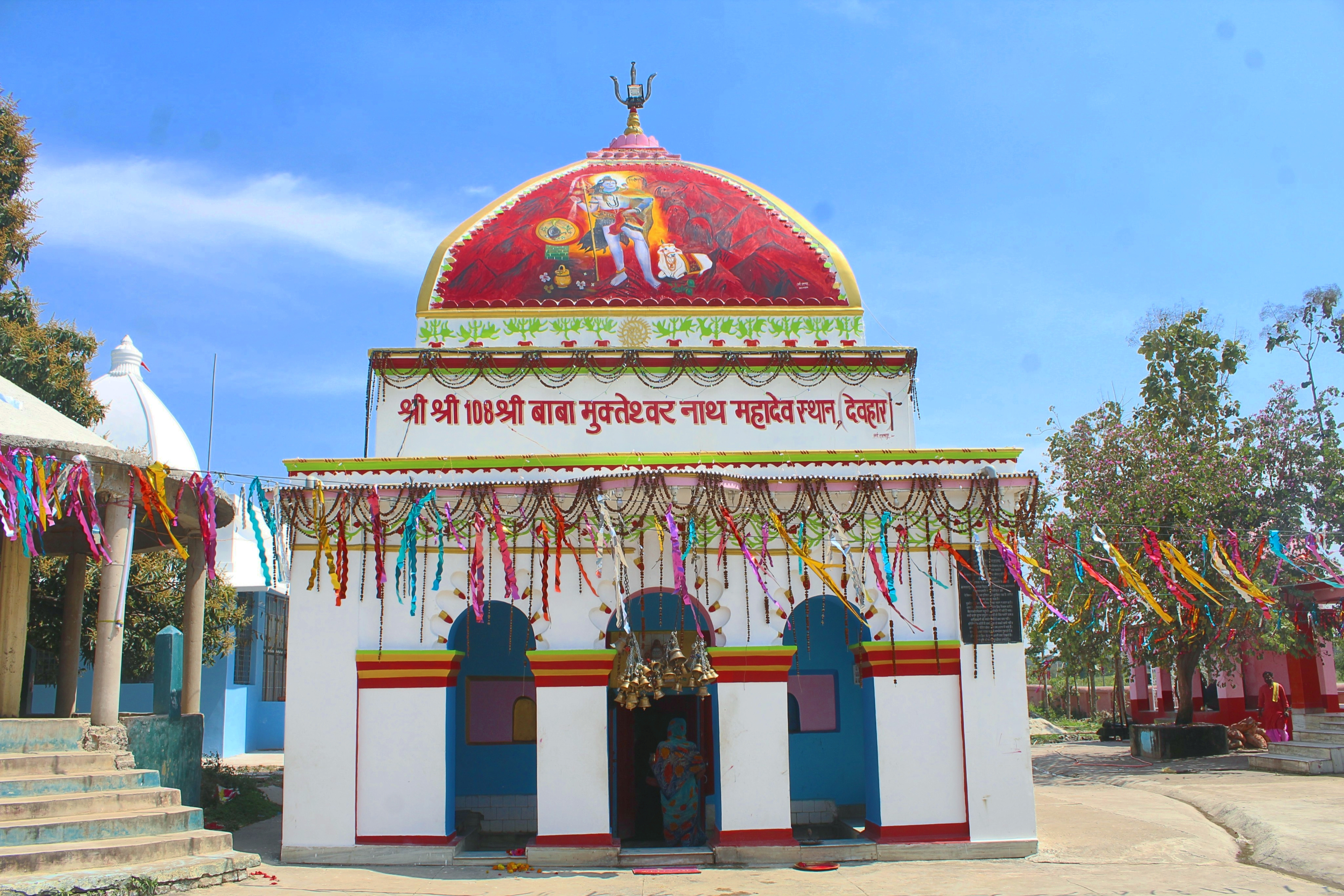
Tirhut style of Baba Mukteshwar Nath Mahadev Mandir in the Mithila region.

== See also ==
- Meru tower
- Vimana (architectural feature)
- Hindu temple architecture
- Balinese temple
- Stupa
- Kadamba Shikhara
