= Wraith (comics) =

Wraith, in comics, may refer to:

- Wraith (Hector Rendoza), a one-time member of the X-Men
- Wraith (Brian DeWolff), a supervillain adversary of Spider-Man
- Wraith (Zak-Del), a character introduced in the Marvel Comics storyline Annihilation Conquest
- Wraith (Yuri Watanabe), a rival and former ally of Spider-Man.
- John Wraith, an X-Men supporting character who goes by the alias of Kestrel
- Wraith (Amalgam Comics) (Todd LeBeau), an Amalgam Comics character from JLX
- Wraith (Image Comics), a member of Dynamo 5, formerly known as Myriad.
- Wraith (independent comics), a funny-animal detective created by Michael T. Gilbert in Quack!, a title of Star Reach Comics

== See also ==
- Wraith (disambiguation)
