= Sekhari (architecture) =

Type of northern Indian tower or spire

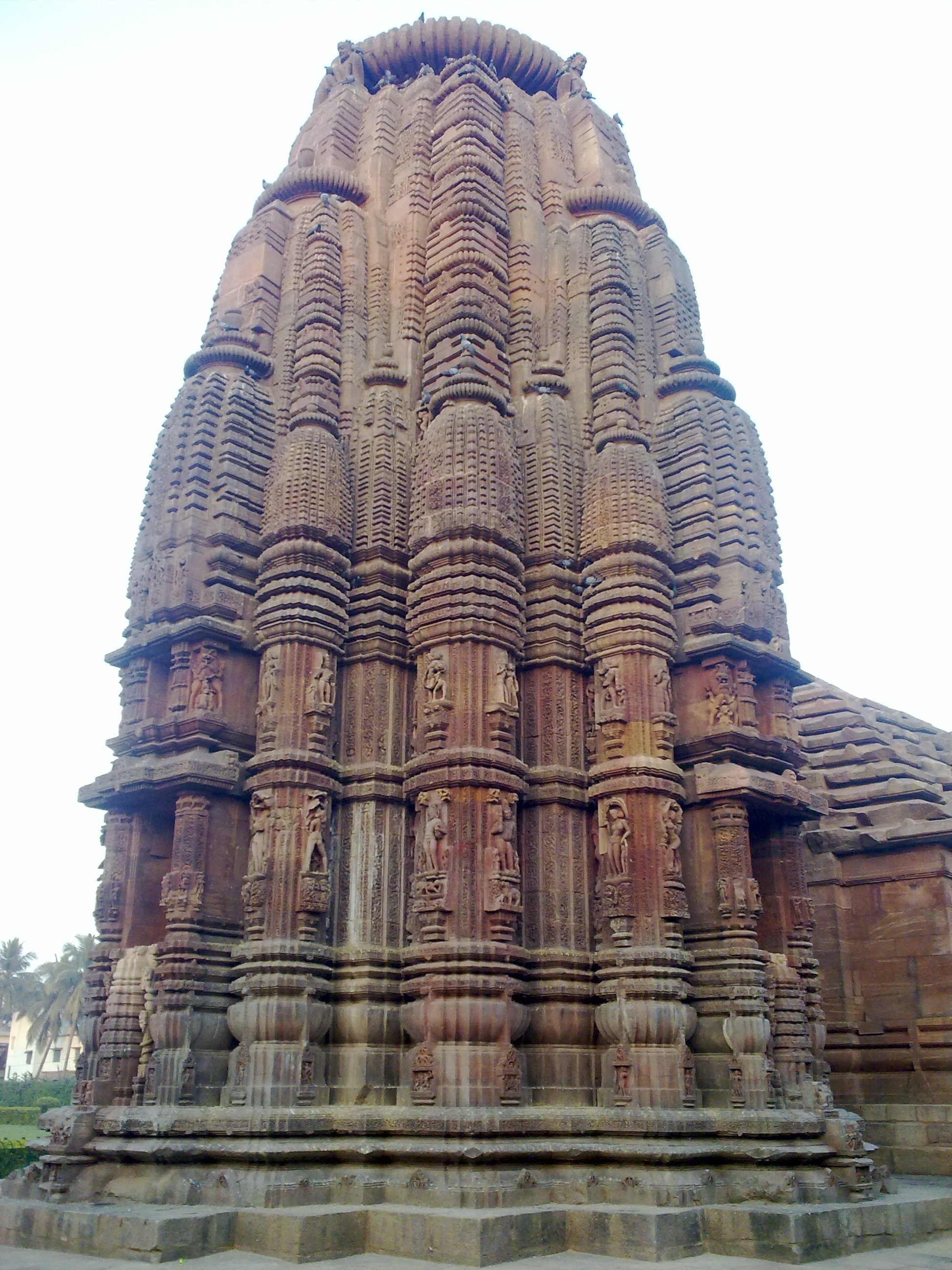
Rajarani Temple, Bhubaneswar

Sekhari or Shekhari is a type of northern Indian shikhara (tower or spire on top of a shrine) which comprises a central Latina spire with urushringa half spires added on all sides. It is one of two sub-types of shikhara, the other being bhumija.
