= Vom Rath =

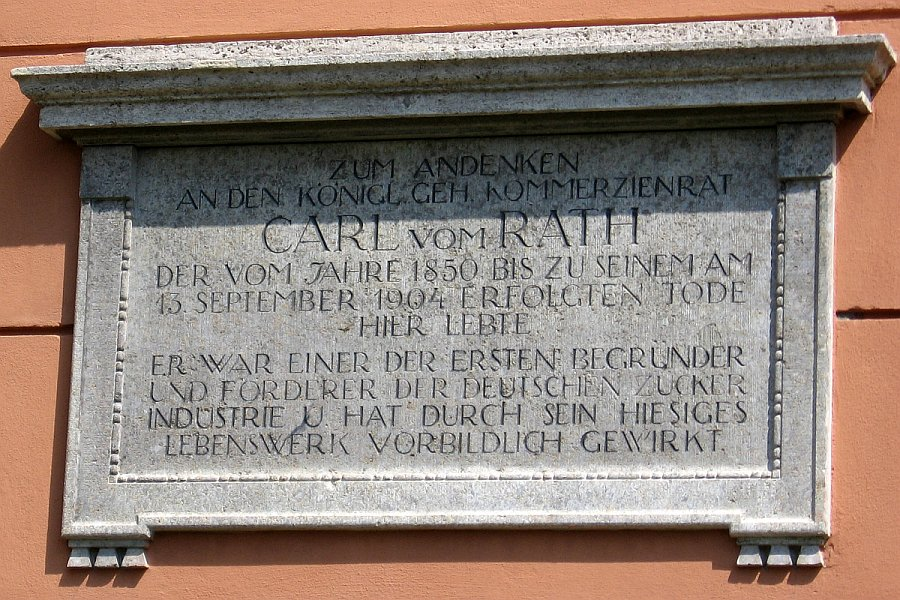
Carl vom Rath, plaque from Koberwitz, Lower Silesia

vom Rath (not von Rath) is a German surname. It may refer to:

- Adolph vom Rath (1832–1907), Prussian banker, co-founder of Deutsche Bank
- Ernst vom Rath, a German diplomat assassinated 1938 in Paris
- Gerhard vom Rath (1830–1888), German mineralogist
- Carl vom Rath (died 13 September 1904), Prussian manufacturer in branch of sugar production (see image)
- Hanna Bekker, née vom Rath, also Hanna Bekker vom Rath (1893–1983), German painter

== See also ==
- Rath (disambiguation)
