= Ratha (architecture) =

Facet of a Hindu temple

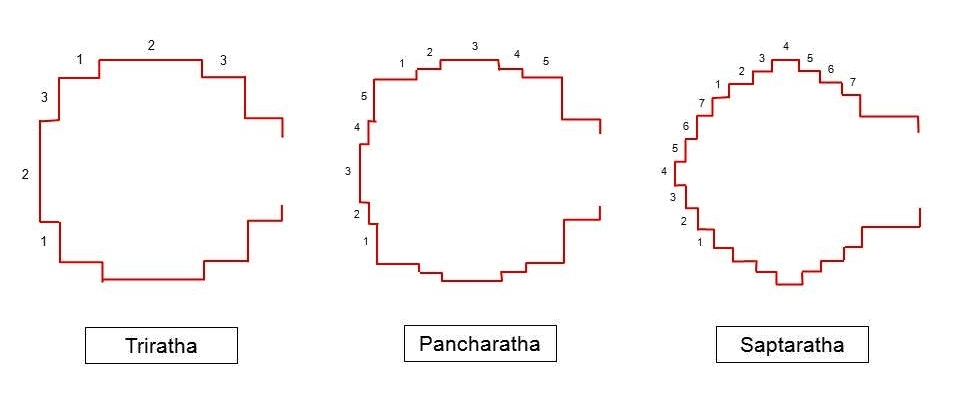
Plans of the main types of buildings with ratha

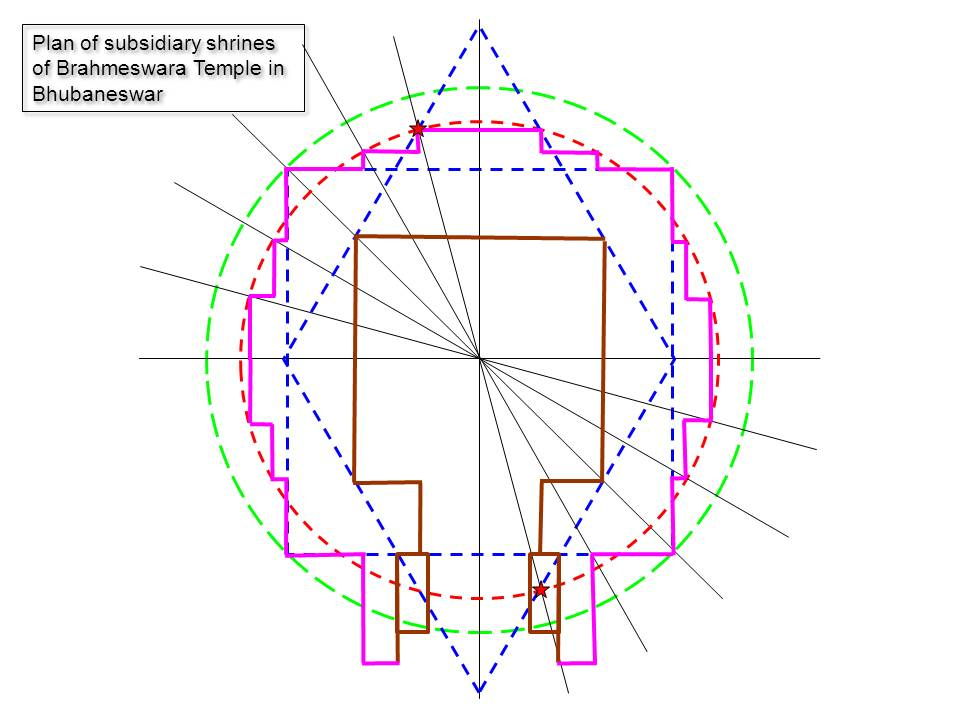
Drawing of a pancharatha (5 ratha) plan

In Hindu temple architecture, a ratha (Sanskrit: रथ, lit. 'chariot', IAST: ratha) is a vertical offset projection on the plan of a structure, particularly of the shikhara above the sanctum. The term has the same meaning when applied to the forms of the bases of statues.

A ratha is generally carried up from the bottom of the temple to the superstructure. The corners of each ratha touch notional circles on the plan of the temple, centred on the murti or cult image inside the sanctum. The sides are oriented along the main horizontal axis of the temple (normally running east–west) or at right angles to it, generating (except around the entrance to the sanctum) a multi-faceted plan that harmonizes the square and the circle, becoming more circular in overall shape as the number of rathas increases.

The rathas may be decorated with geometric figures or statues, such as statues of a gatekeeper watching outside or a niche with a statue of a deity. Sometimes, the facet of the ratha is hollowed to the interior; these are rathas with recesses. If there is only one facet, this is a temple with three rathas (triratha): the wall and the facets on the left and the right.

If there is a main facet and a secondary one, the temple has five rathas (pancharatha). There are also temples with seven rathas (saptaratha) and nine rathas (navaratha).

== Etymology ==
In Sanskrit, the word "ratha" means "cart" or "chariot", but the link with this meaning is not clear. A ratha, meaning cart, is also the temple chariot used for processing the murti at festivals, and a "ratha temple" is one designed to resemble a cart, with wheels on the sides, and often horses. The most famous example is the Sun Temple, Konarak.

== Examples of triratha temples ==
- Parasurameswar Temple in Bhubaneswar
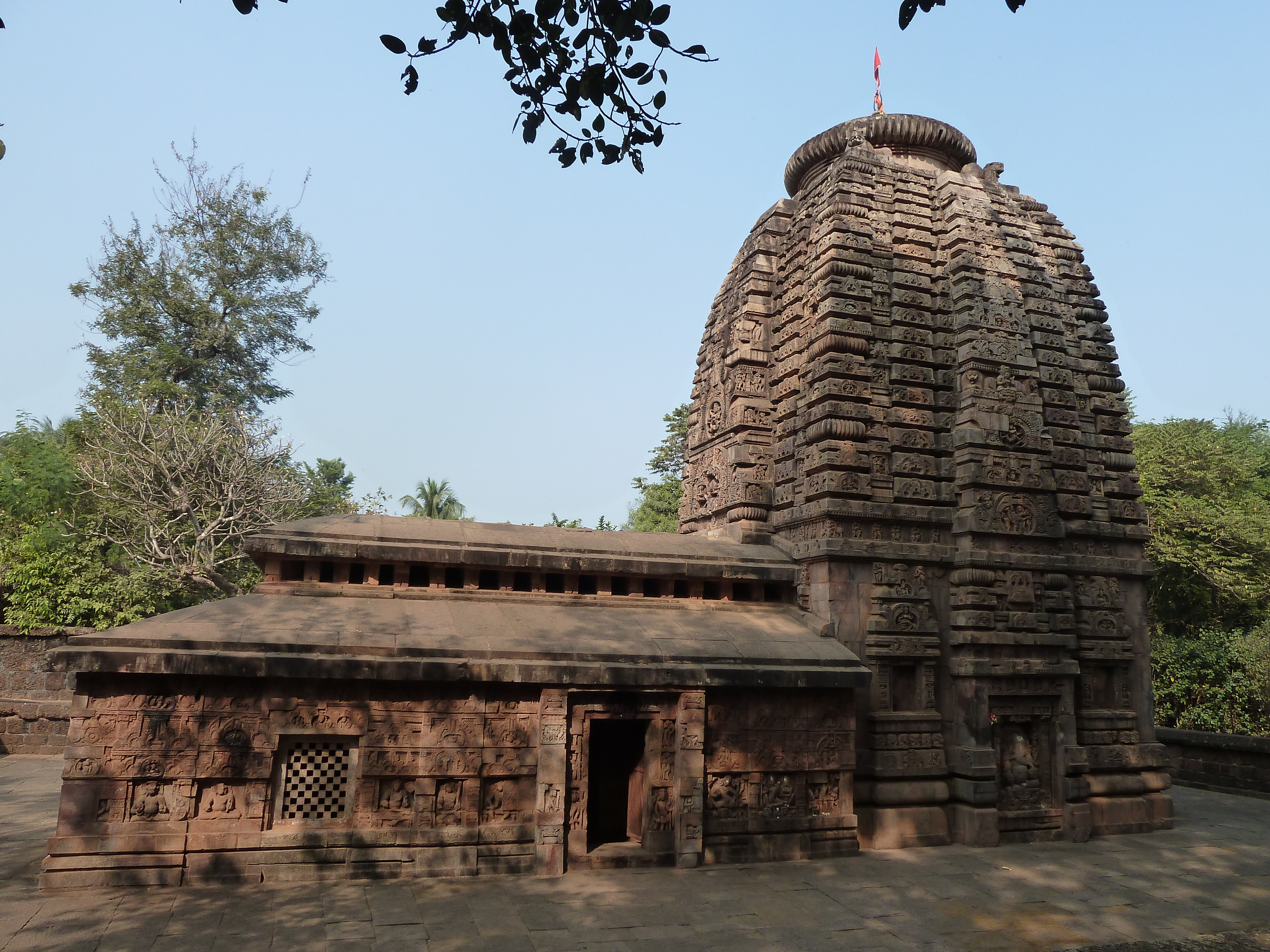
Parasurameswar Temple
- Lakhamandal Temple in Jaunsar-Bawar, Dehradun, Uttarakhand
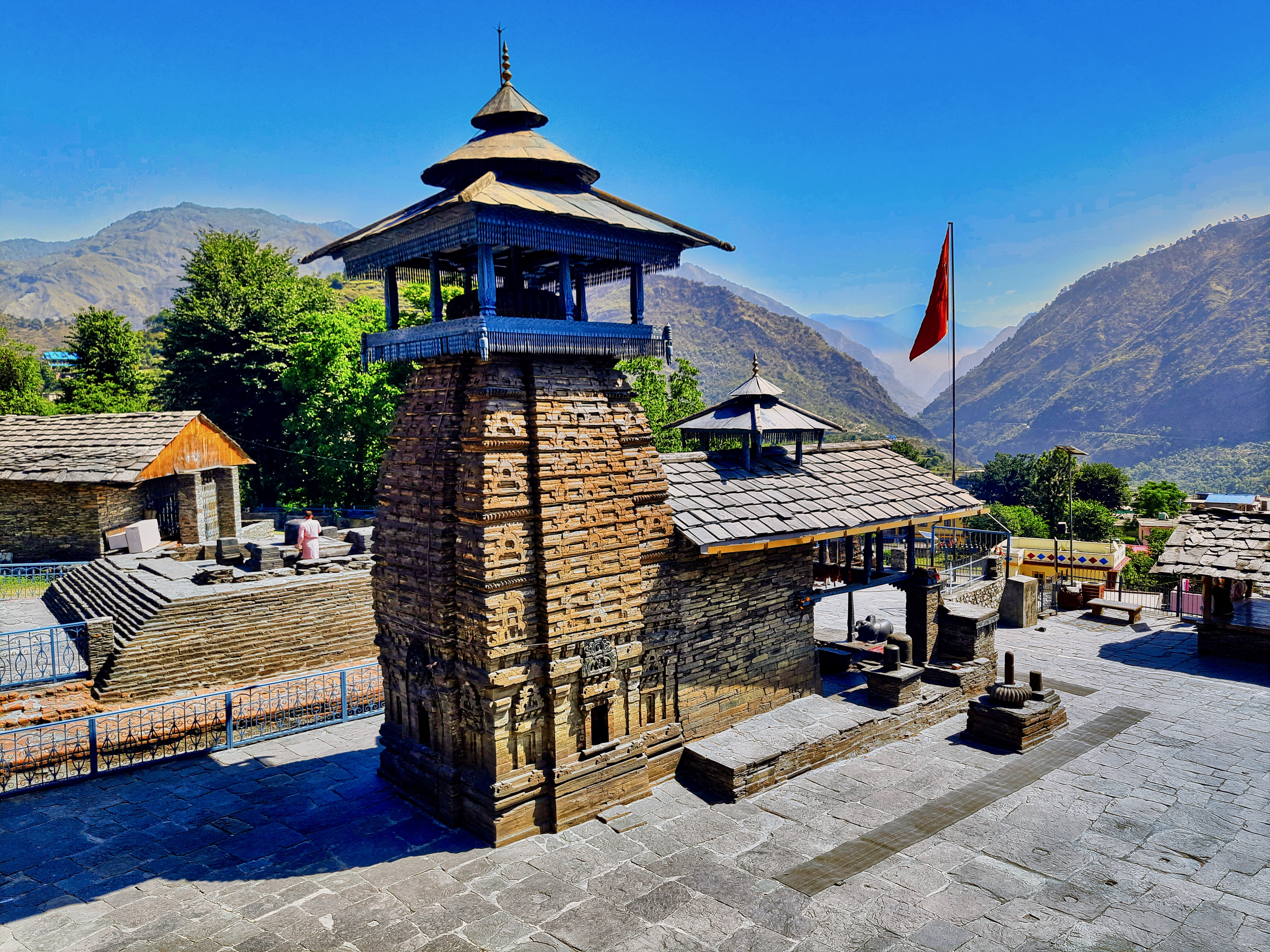
  Lakhamandal Temple

== Examples of pancharatha temples ==
- Lingaraja Temple in Bhubaneswar
- Lakshmana Temple in Khajuraho
- Jagannath Temple in Puri, Orissa
Pancharatha temples
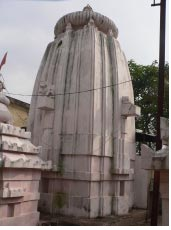
Isanesvara Siva Temple in Bhubaneswar

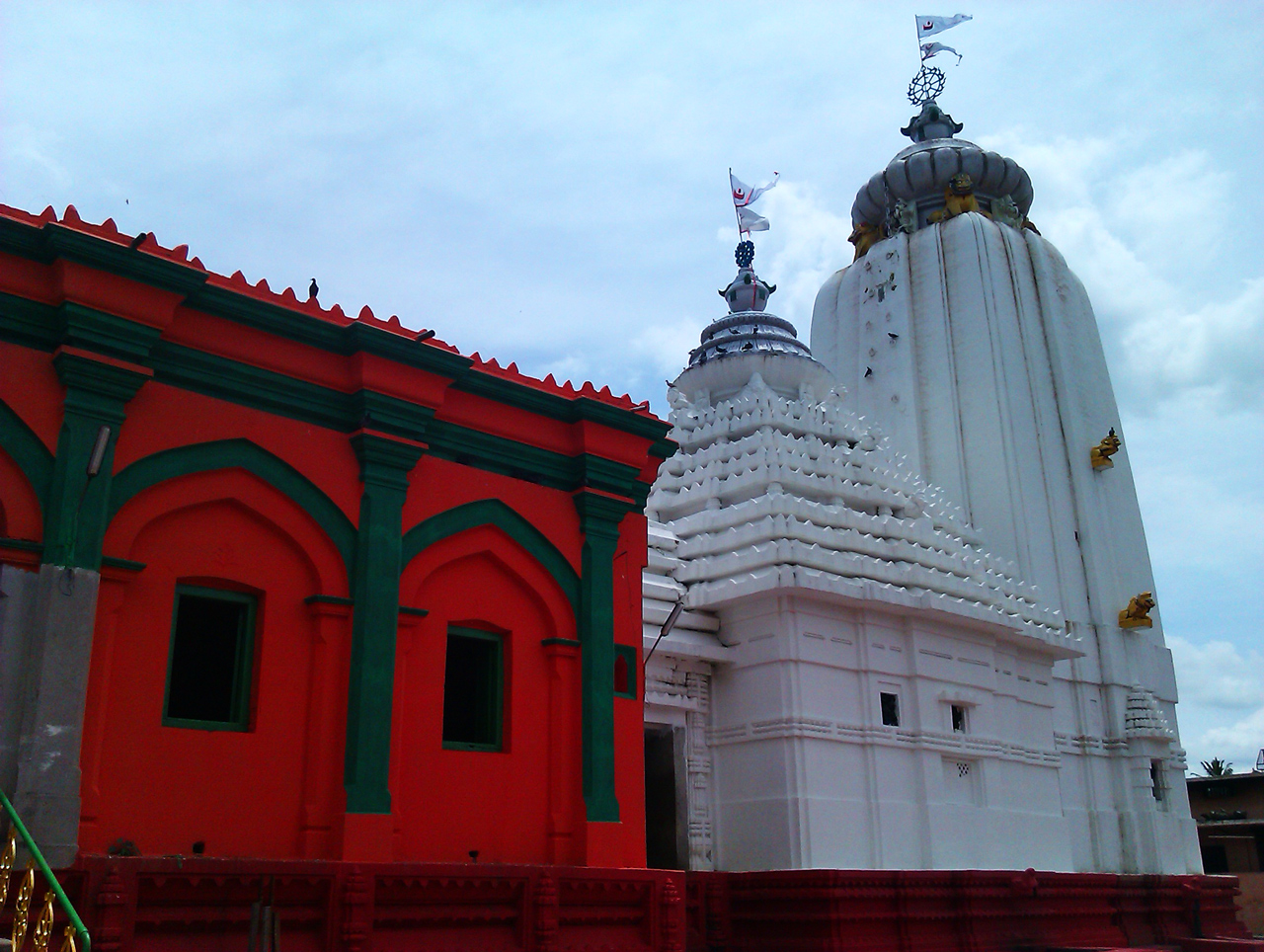
Jagannath Temple in Baripada

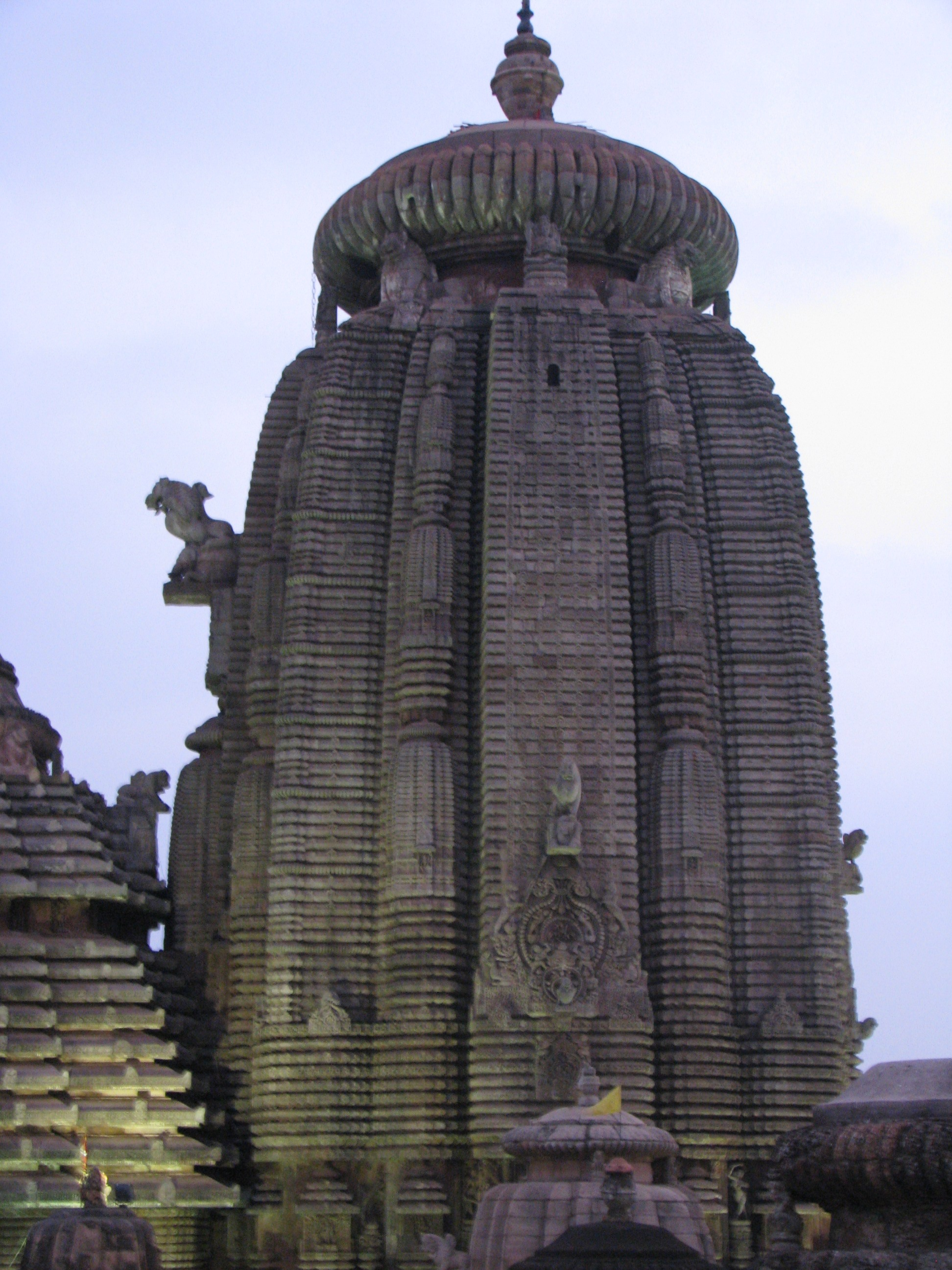
Lingaraja Temple in Bhubaneswar

== Examples of saptaratha temples ==
- Chaturbhuja Temple in Khajuraho
- Shiva Lakhesvara Temple near Bhubaneswar
- Shikhara of the temple of Swayambhunath in Kathmandu
Saptratha temples
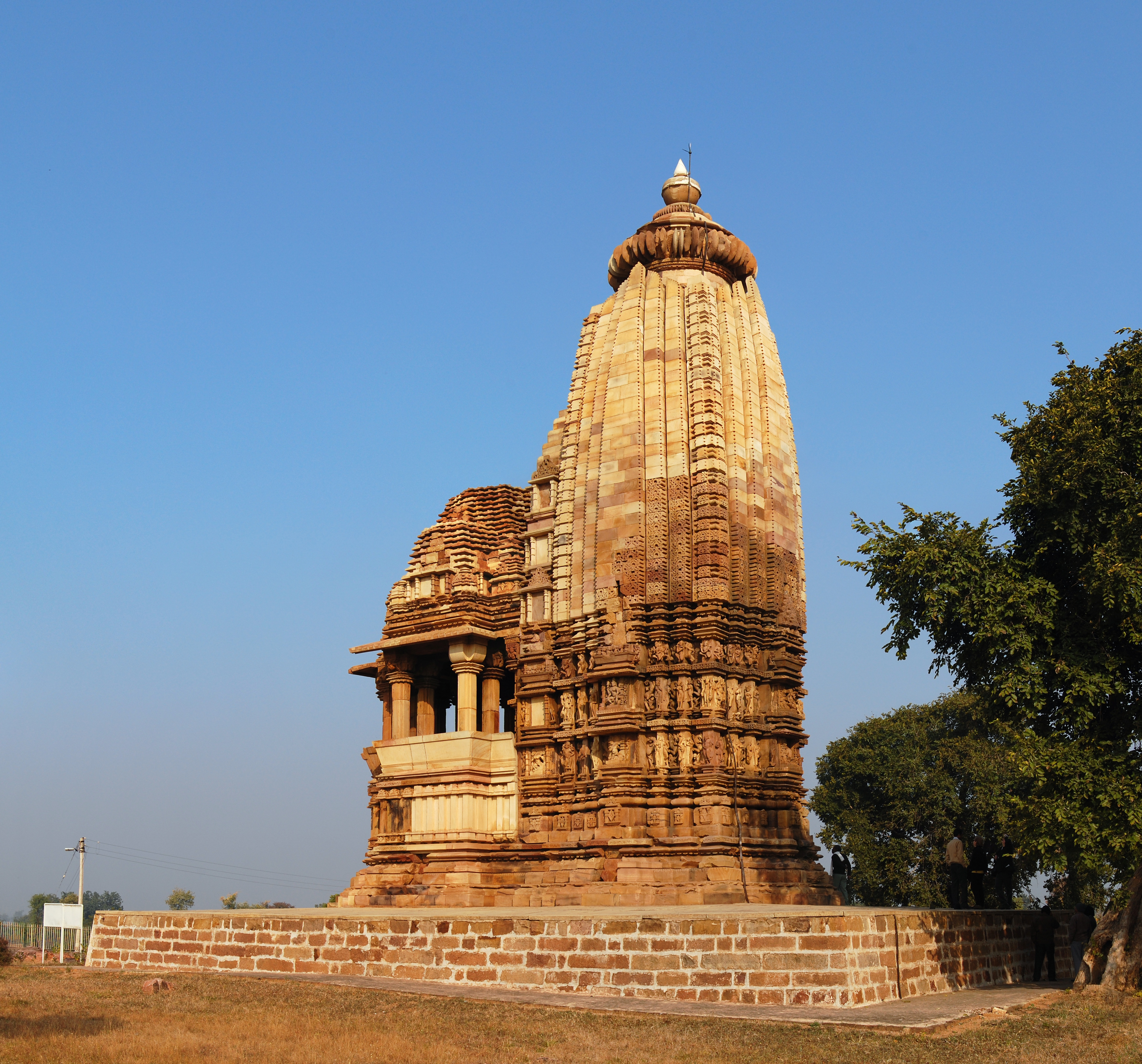
Chaturbhuja Temple

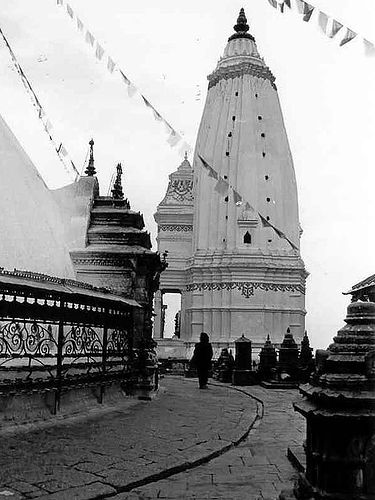
Shikhara of Swayambunath

== Examples of navaratha temples ==
- Adinath Temple in Khajuraho
- Vamana temple in Khajuraho
- Shiva Purvesvara Temple near Bhubaneswar
Navaratha temples
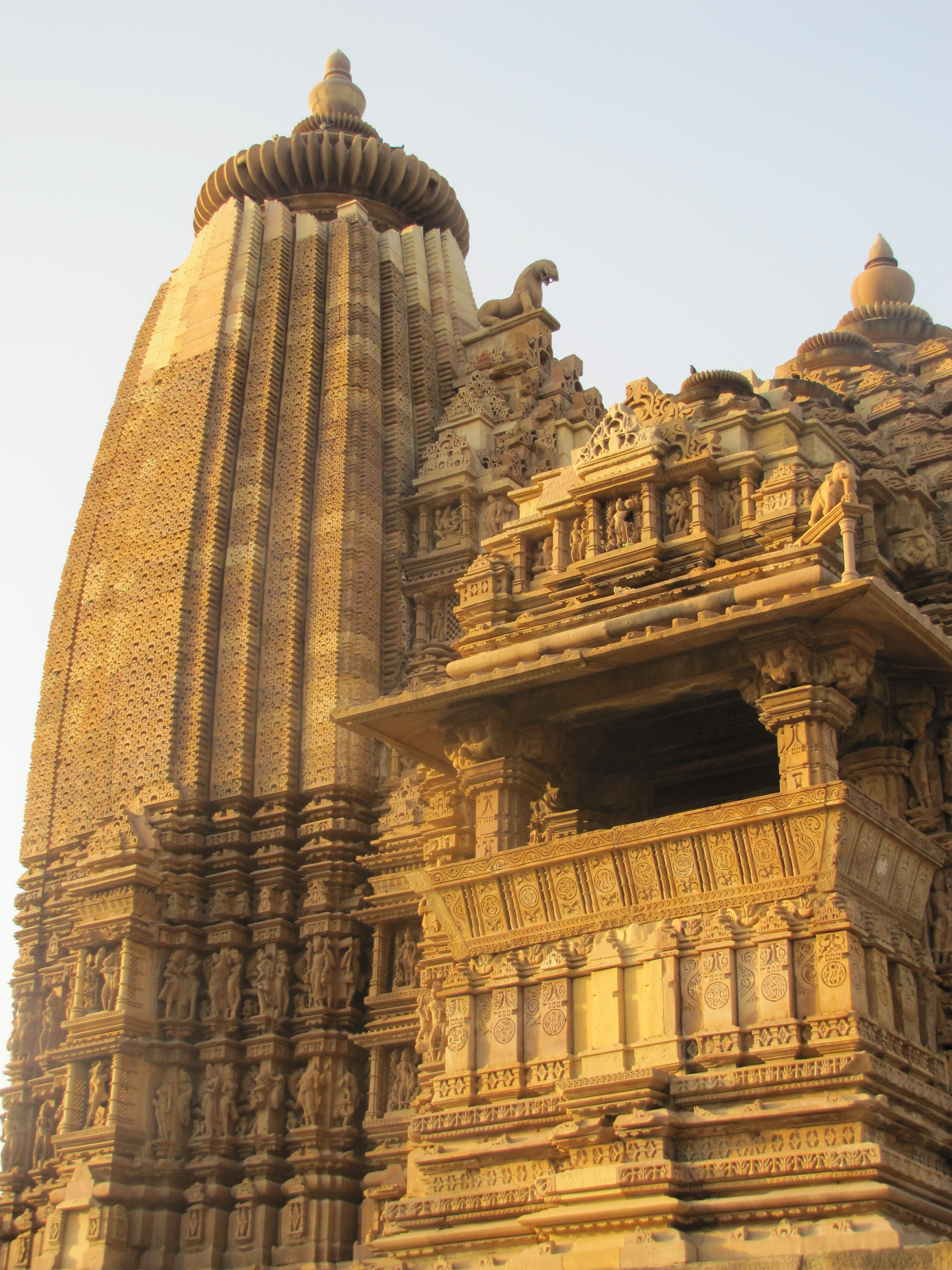
Vamana Temple

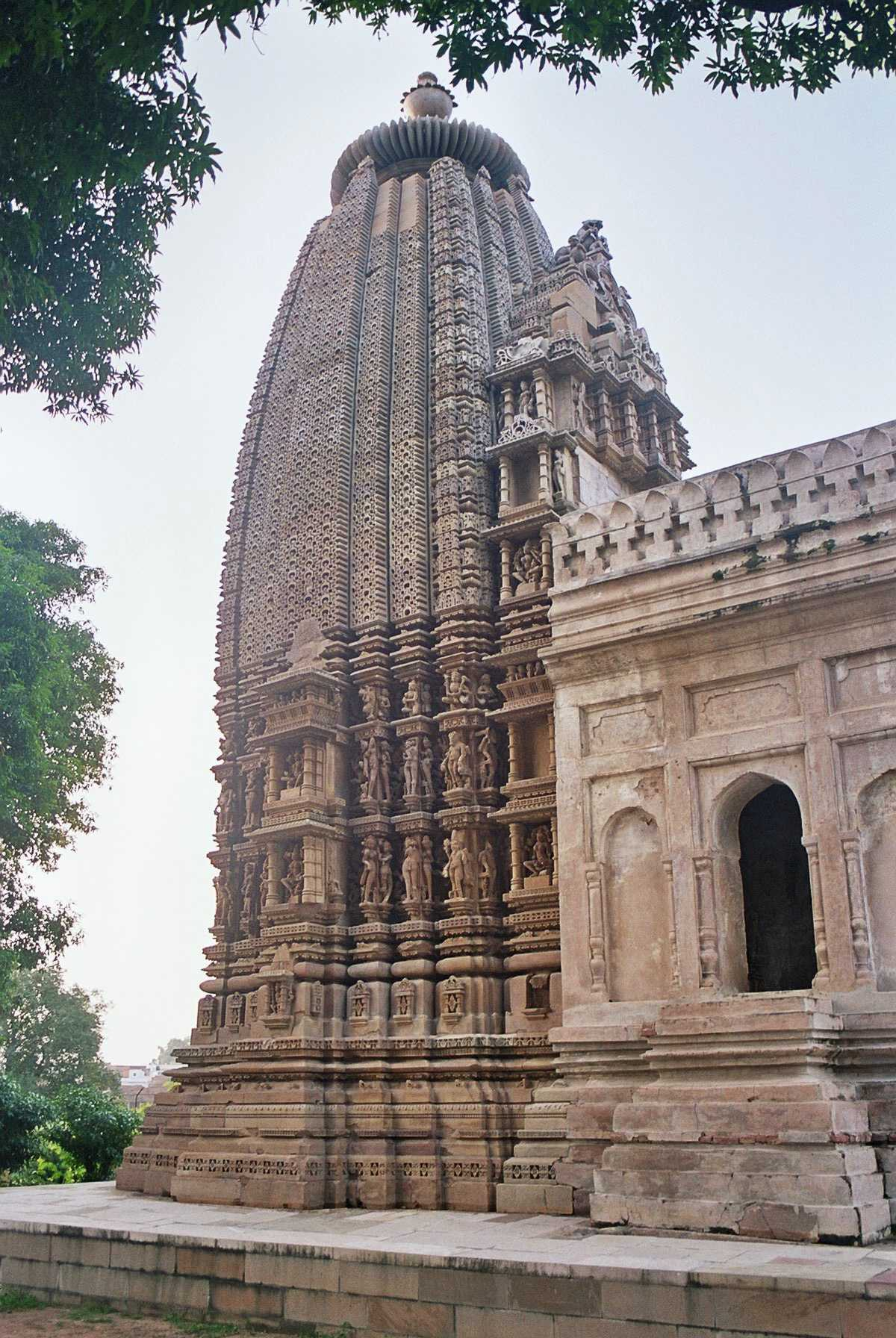
Adinath Temple
