= Rath, County Tipperary =

Townland in County Tipperary, Ireland

Coordinates: 53°5.7′N 8°1.4′W

Rath (An Ráth in Irish) is a townland in the historical Barony of Ormond Lower, County Tipperary, Ireland. Its location straddles the R438 road south of Walshpark in the civil parish of Dorrha.
