= Mass destruction =

Mass destruction may refer to:

- The effect of a weapon of mass destruction that can kill a large number of humans or cause great damage
- "Mass Destruction" (song), by Faithless, 2004
- Mass Destruction (video game), 1997
- "Mass Destruction", a song from the video game Persona 3, 2006
- "Mass Destruction", the seventh episode of the animated YouTube series Murder Drones, 2024

== See also ==
- Mass killing
