= Roam (musician) =

Canadian musician and record producer

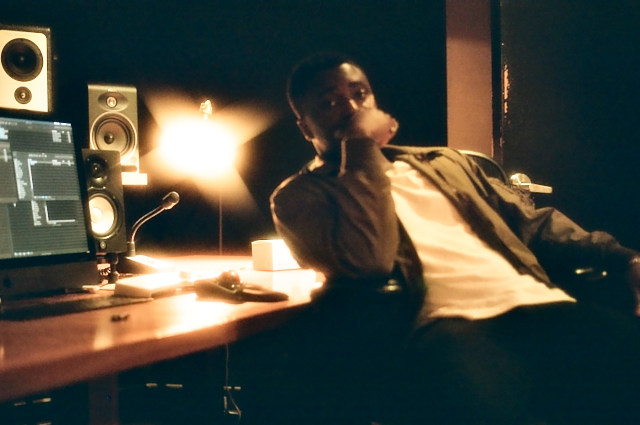
- Roam in studio

Background information
- Origin: Toronto, Canada
- Genres: Electronic; UK garage; future garage; hip hop; IDM
- Occupations: Record producer; songwriter
- Instruments: MIDI; guitar; synthesizer; vocals
- Years active: 2017–present
- Labels: Independent, Biblioteka Records, Pyramid Blood

Roam is a Canadian electronic musician, rap record producer and songwriter based out of Toronto. Roam gained notoriety in late 2017 for his production style which often blends UK garage, future garage and 2-step garage influences with modern Toronto hip hop sounds and production techniques. Roam has released 2 full-length studio albums, 1 compilation album, 4 EPs and several singles since 2017. In 2022 he was named 1 of 8 artists shaping the future of Canadian electronic music

== Musical career ==
=== 2017–2018 ===
Roam released the singles "Taker" and "Say It" in 2017, the latter of which prompted NOW magazine to claim Roam was both a "musician to watch" as well as the music producer bringing musical styles such as UK garage, trip hop and early 2000s minimal house to Toronto.

On 14 February 2018, Roam released his debut album, Remnants on Vice. Noisey writer Phil Witmer claimed Roam was "the producer bringing dark UK garage to Toronto" comparing his music to the work of UK Bass and Future garage artist Burial. Witmer also stated that Remnants emphasized the cultural and musical ties that London and Toronto share. The album received warm praise from Kevin Press of Exclaim! Magazine who made note of Roam's production and sampling of R&B vocals.

Shortly after the release of Remnants Roam released the single "Echoes" in early spring. The single was included in a NOW Magazine playlist made up of music from Toronto's "Rising Stars".

In April, Toronto rap duo HardToKill released their self-titled project Hard To Kill featuring "Papercranes", which was produced by Roam.

In July, Roam released a 4 track EP, DEPTHS, which was inspired by a three-year period during which he struggled with mental health complications. Depths also received praise from Exclaim! Magazine.

In October 2018, Roam premiered the acoustic UKG song "Embraced..." on Complex's UK site.

=== 2019 ===
In March 2019, with the help of writer Melissa Vincent, Roam published a series of poems on Canadian music and pop culture website A.Side to help illustrate the meanings and circumstances behind each song on DEPTHS.

On the same day as the release of the poems, Roam also premiered the song "All Night" on indie music blog Ohestee.

In late spring, Toronto-based arts and culture publication Demo Magazine published their 15th Issue highlighting Sean Leon and Roam, framing them as "new artists who are just emerging onto the dynamic Canadian music scene." The issue included a 2-page interview feature on Roam in which he was dubbed "Toronto's Future Garage Producer".

Later that year, Roam released the song "Regrets".

=== 2020-2021 ===
In early May, Roam released the lead up singles "Momentum" and "Fools Errand", shortly afterwards releasing his second album, The Wraith, on 16 May 2020. The album was featured on Resident Advisor and XLR8R.

The cover art for "The Wraith" (Original 2020 Release), an electronic album by Toronto based music producer Roam.

The Wraith was about what it feels like to "drift apart from our oldest & dearest friends, the ones who we often assume will be around forever & with whom we’ve shared considerably large parts of our lives." The title ‘The Wraith’ is a metaphor for "the memory of the bond you had with someone and how it can haunt you before you accept reality & move on". North American RA Editor Andrew Ryce stated that "the album features gorgeous, perfectly swung tracks". Jordan Darville of The Fader called the album "a hidden gem with flashes of brilliant color dancing across its overwhelming greyscale".

Roam's production on The Wraith draws elements from various other musical genres in addition to the genres Roam usually employs. The album includes a re-worked version of Roam's 2018 single "Embraced..." that featured different drums, more guitar elements and a modified arrangement. The tone of the album was inspired by films such as Eternal Sunshine of the Spotless Mind, Her and Lost in Translation, featuring dialogue from each film. The final song "Fools Errand" (the third of the album's three bonus tracks) was inspired by the collective societal anxieties induced by the physical distancing and self-quarantine protocols used to contain the COVID-19 pandemic.

In July, while fundraising through Bandcamp for initiatives that support Black Lives and Anti-racism Roam released the song "Reckonings", a song inspired by the global BLM protests against racial injustices as well as his own experiences as a Black Person. The song was featured on NOW Magazine's Best Music of 2020 List.

In early August, Roam released the song "Whispers" with independent experimental label Biblioteka Records.

On 19 October, a music video for the song "Fools Errand" was released and was featured on Resident Advisor. The video, much like the song itself was also inspired by the COVID-19 physical distancing and self-quarantine measures.

On 21 December, Roam released "How To Let Go". The single was featured in The Fader, Resident Advisor and NOW Magazine. The Fader called the single an example of sonic hauntology with "inviting synths that dance like butterflies over the skittering beat, as stretched vocals moan like ghostly choirs." The Resident Advisor piece revealed that the song was intended to be "a bit of an early xmas gift that encouraged people to positively look towards the future after the horrendous year we've had". NOW included the song in their "Start 2021 on a High Note" music feature.

Later during 2021 Roam released the song "ChangeOfHeart".

The cover art for "The Wraith (Remastered & Abridged), an electronic album by Toronto based music producer Roam. Cover art for "REVENGE" a 6 track EP & the 6th project by Toronto based music producer Roam. Cover art for "DEVIANTS" a Mixtape/Compilation album released by Toronto based music producer Roam.

=== 2022–2024 ===
On 14 August 2022 Roam released a 5 song EP called "Paid Dues (Vol.1)".

The following year in April Roam released a single called "THE ONE" which was included on a new 4 song EP called "Paid Dues (Vol.2)" released in May.

A week later Roam released a new version of his 2020 album The Wraith entitled "The Wraith (Remastered & Abridged)" featuring improved mixes, arrangements, some added instrumentation and a more concise runtime.

In November 2023 Roam released a single and music video for the song "TRADES" the lead single from his 6 song EP "REVENGE" which followed very shortly after.

In June 2024 Roam released the single "Nasty"; later revealed by CBC Music to be a part of a compilation project entitled "DEVIANTS" released exclusively on Bandcamp with physical editions published by Pyramid Blood Records.

== Discography ==
=== Studio albums ===
List of full-length albums, with selected details
Title	Album details
Remnants	Released: 14 February 2018; Label: self-released; Format: digital download
The Wraith	Released: 16 May 2020; Label: self-released; Format: digital download
The Wraith (Remastered & Abridged)	Released: 16 May 2023; Label: self-released; Format: digital download

=== Compilation albums/mixtapes ===
List of compilations and mixtapes, with selected details
Title	Album details
DEVIANTS	Released: 26 July 2024; Label: Pyramid Blood; Format: digital download, physical release (CD and Cassette)

=== Extended plays ===
List of extended plays, with selected details
Title	EP Details
Depths	Released: 31 July 2018; Label: self-released; Format: digital download
Paid Dues (Vol.1)	Released: 14 August 2022; Label: self-released; Format: digital download
Paid Dues (Vol.2)	Released: 8 May 2023; Label: self-released; Format: digital download
REVENGE	Released: 30 Nov 2023; Label: self-released; Format: digital download

=== Singles ===
List of singles as a lead artist, showing year released and album name
Title	Year	Album
"Taker"	2017	Remnants
"Say It"	2017	Remnants
"Echoes"	2018	non-album single
"Embraced..."	2018	non-album single
"All Night"	2019	non-album single
"Regrets"	2019	non-album single
"Momentum"	2020	The Wraith
"Fools Errand"	2020	The Wraith
"Reckonings"	2020	non-album single
"Whispers"	2020	non-album single
"How to Let Go"	2020	non-album single
"ChangeOfHeart"	2021	non-album single
"The One"	2023	Paid Dues Vol. 2
"TRADES"	2023	REVENGE
"Nasty"	2024	DEVIANTS

=== Music videos ===
List of music videos, showing year released and directors
Title	Year	Director(s)
"Fools Errand"	2020	Jamie Hurcomb
"TRADES"	2023	Roam
