= Rath (Odia surname) =

ରଥ

Regions with significant populations

Languages
- Odia, Sanskrit

Related ethnic groups
- Utkala Brahmins, Pancha Gauda Brahmins

Rath, Ratha or Rathasharma (Odia: ରଥ, ରଥଶର୍ମା, Sanskrit: रथ, रथशर्मा) people are Utkala Brahmins having Atreya or Krishnatreya gotra. They belong to the Utkaliya Brahmin group of Northern India Panch Gauda Brahmins. Among other Brahmin communities they hold high social status as learned scholars. Others took advice from them regarding religious or social activities.

They trace their lineage to Saptarshi Atri Rishi, who lived near Mandakini river near Chitrakoot with his wife Sati Anusuiya. In Ramayana Lord Ram along with his wife Sita and brother Lakshman visited Rishi Atri and Sati Anusuiya at their house near Chitrakoot after crossing Yamuna river from Prayagraj. Rishi Atri advised Lord Ram to proceed to Dandakarayana for vanvaas. Maa Sati Anusuiya gave Sita Divya alankar and anga vastra, which she had received from Brahma, Vishnu, and Maheswar. These deva alankars and vastra remain new forever. Sita used these anga vastra during fourteen years of vanvaas at panchbati. When Ravan took Sita away from Panchbati, she dropped these Divya Alankaar from Pushpak Viman which helped Ram to reach Lanka.

Atreya gotri generally belong to Kaanva sakha of Yajurveda. Being a Vedic Brahmin, Atreya gotri are ordained to do adhyayan (learning) and adhyapaan (teaching) of Vedas and other shastras. As they are shrotiya Brahmins, they are authorised to conduct Yagna and other Vedic rituals. However they usually do not perform karm Kand i.e., brotopanoyan, marriage, shraddh ceremony nor do they receive daan or dakshina.

Between the tenth and the twelfth centuries the Gajapati (Maharaja) of Jagannath dham (Puri) invited learned Brahmins from Gangetic basin to Utkala and established Utkaliya Brahmin parampara. He gave them land and other facilities in sixteen villages (sola sashan) near Puri for Vedic studies and performing rituals of Lord Jagannath. Subsequently, with the permission of Gajapati King Atreya Gotri Brahmins migrated to Nayagad, Ganjam, Paralakhemundi, Jeypore and other kingdoms in southern Odisha. They also migrated to Cuttack, Dhenkanal, Sambalpur and Balangir in western Odisha. They however remained south of Mahanadi and rarely traveled to north Odisha.

The unique attribute of Atreya gotri is their Istha Devi, who is Bhubaneswari irrespective of their place or lokachar.

Surnames in ancient days were given according to gotra and the speciality of the job done by Brahmin scholars. They especially conducted the Vikriti Paatha of Shukla Yajurveda and Rigveda which is Ratha Patha. The Veda can be recited in eleven different ways among which three are Prakruti and remaining eight are Vikruti. These are Samhita (Richa), Pada, Krama (3 Prakruti) and Jataa, Rekha, Maala, Dhwaja, Shikha, Danda, Ratha and Ghana (Vikrutis). The surname holders mastered the Ratha tradition of chanting Veda. Sometimes they are called Rathatreya(रथात्रेय).

== Tradition ==
These group of Brahmins have Harihara worship and Bhuvaneshwari worship as family tradition. Goddess Bhuvaneshvari is regarded as their Kula devi. Many Odia Devi Mahatmya Pandits belong to this sub group. The revival of Utkala Brahmins is attributed to Pandit Shri Sadashiva Rathasharma who in the mid 20th century re-established Sanskrit education around Odisha. The Sadashiva Parishad is established in Puri to keep Sanskrit education alive.

== Gotra ==
Ātreya (Sanskrit: आत्रेय) Gotra: Generally belonging to the lineage of Maharṣi Atri, seer of the 5th maṇḍala of the Ṛk Veda. Specifically, they are the direct descendants of Maharṣi Rathātreya (रथात्रेय) one of the seers of this maṇḍala.

== See also ==
- Arun Rath
- Atreya
