= Vamana Temple, Khajuraho =

Building in India

Vamana Temple
- वामन मंदिर
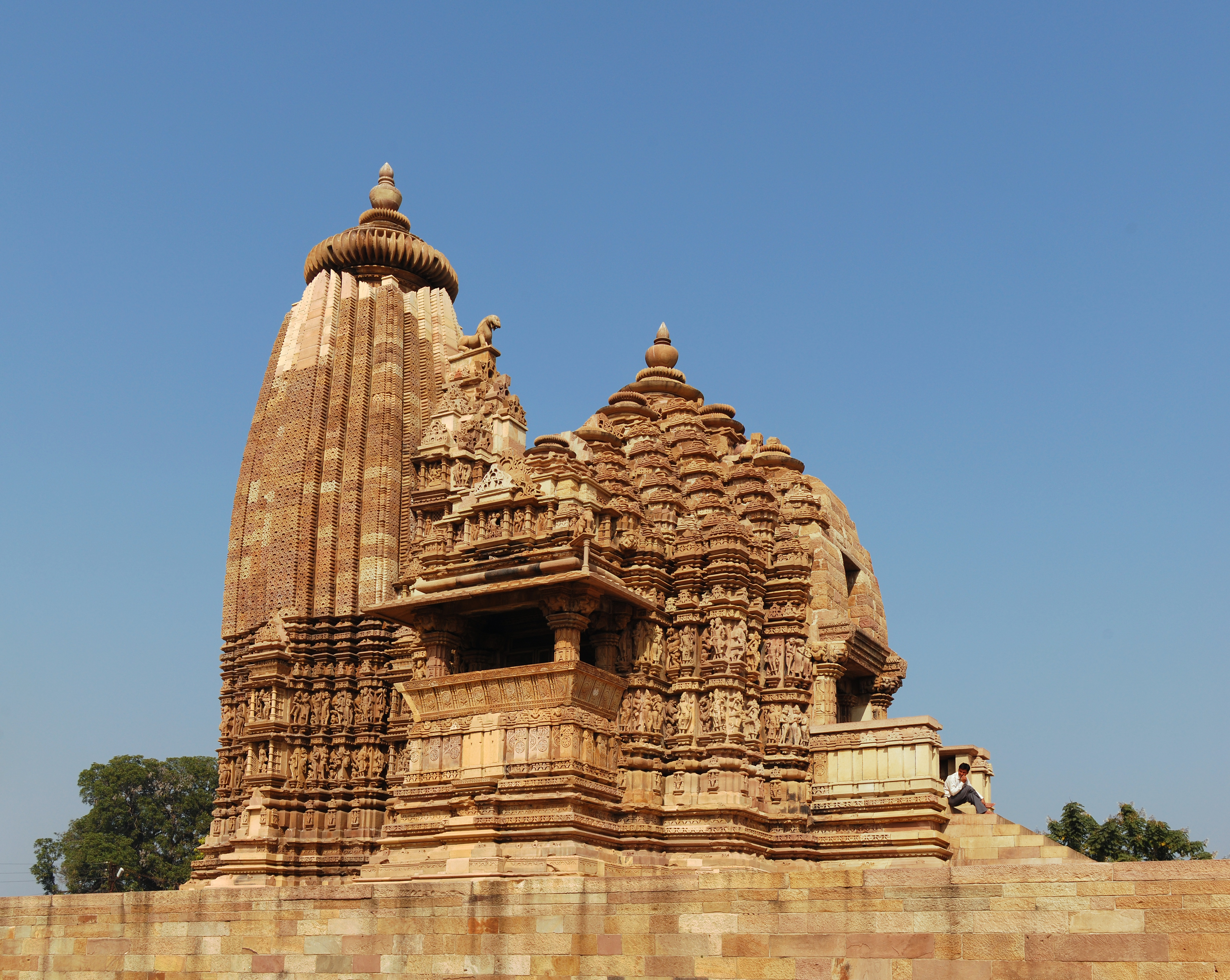
- Vamana temple at Khajuraho

- Location in Madhya Pradesh

Religion
- Affiliation: Hinduism
- District: Chattarpur, Khajuraho
- Deity: Vamana, avatar of Vishnu

Location
- Location: Khajuraho
- State: Madhya Pradesh
- Country: India
- Interactive map of Vamana Temple
- Coordinates: 24°51′11″N 79°55′10″E

Architecture
- Creator: Chandella Rulers
- Completed: Assignable to circa 1050-75.
- Temple: 1

Vamana temple (Devanagri:वामन मंदिर) is a Hindu temple dedicated to Vamana, an avatar of the god Vishnu. The temple was built between 1050 and 1075. It forms part of the Khajuraho Group of Monuments, a UNESCO World Heritage Site listed because of its exceptional architecture, art, and testimony to the Chandela dynasty.

== Location ==
The temple is located in the eastern area of Khajuraho. It is situated about 200 meters to the north-east to Brahma Temple.

== Architecture ==
It has a sanctum, vestibule, maha-mandapa with lateral transepts and an entrance-porch.

== Gallery ==
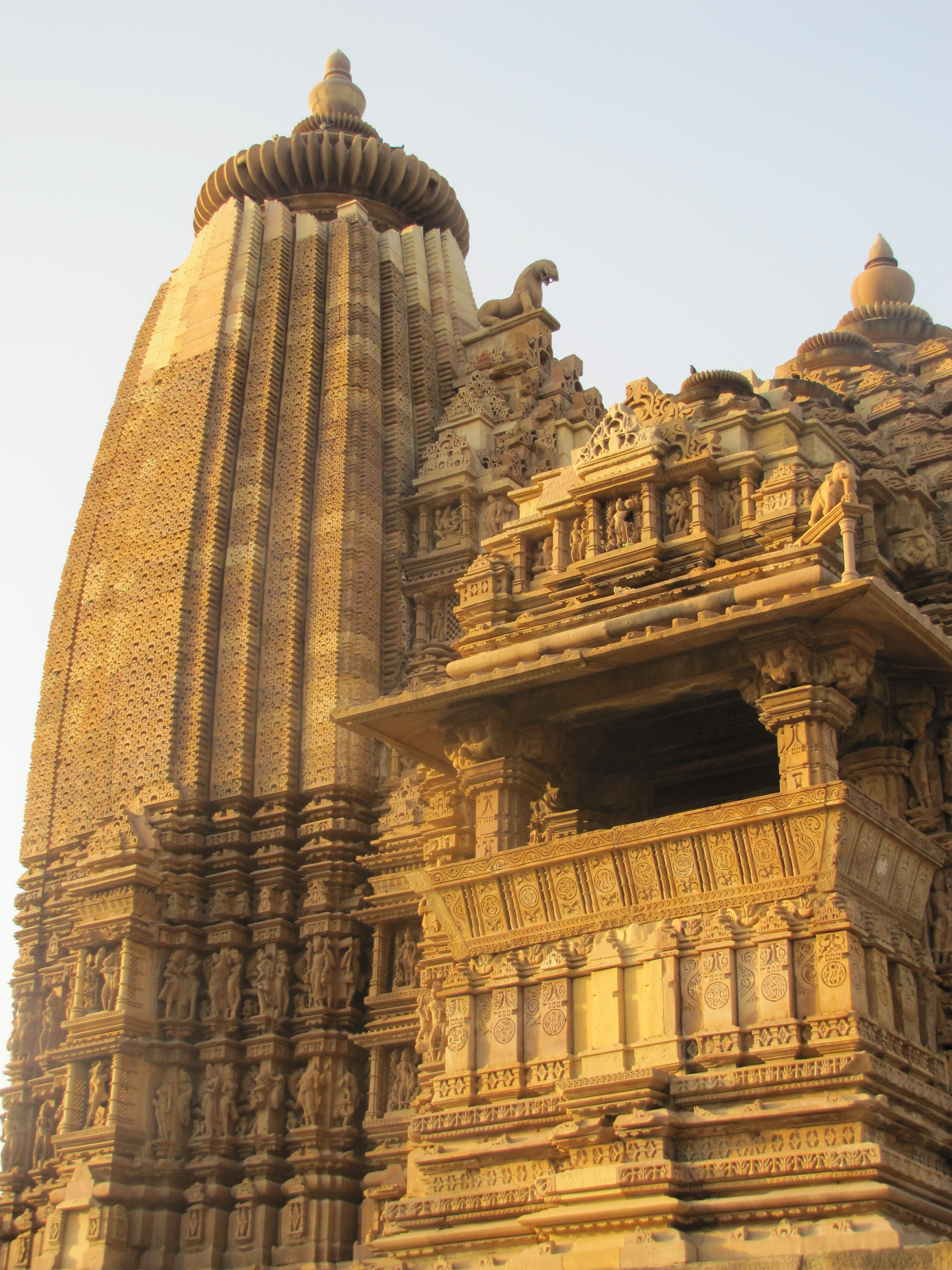

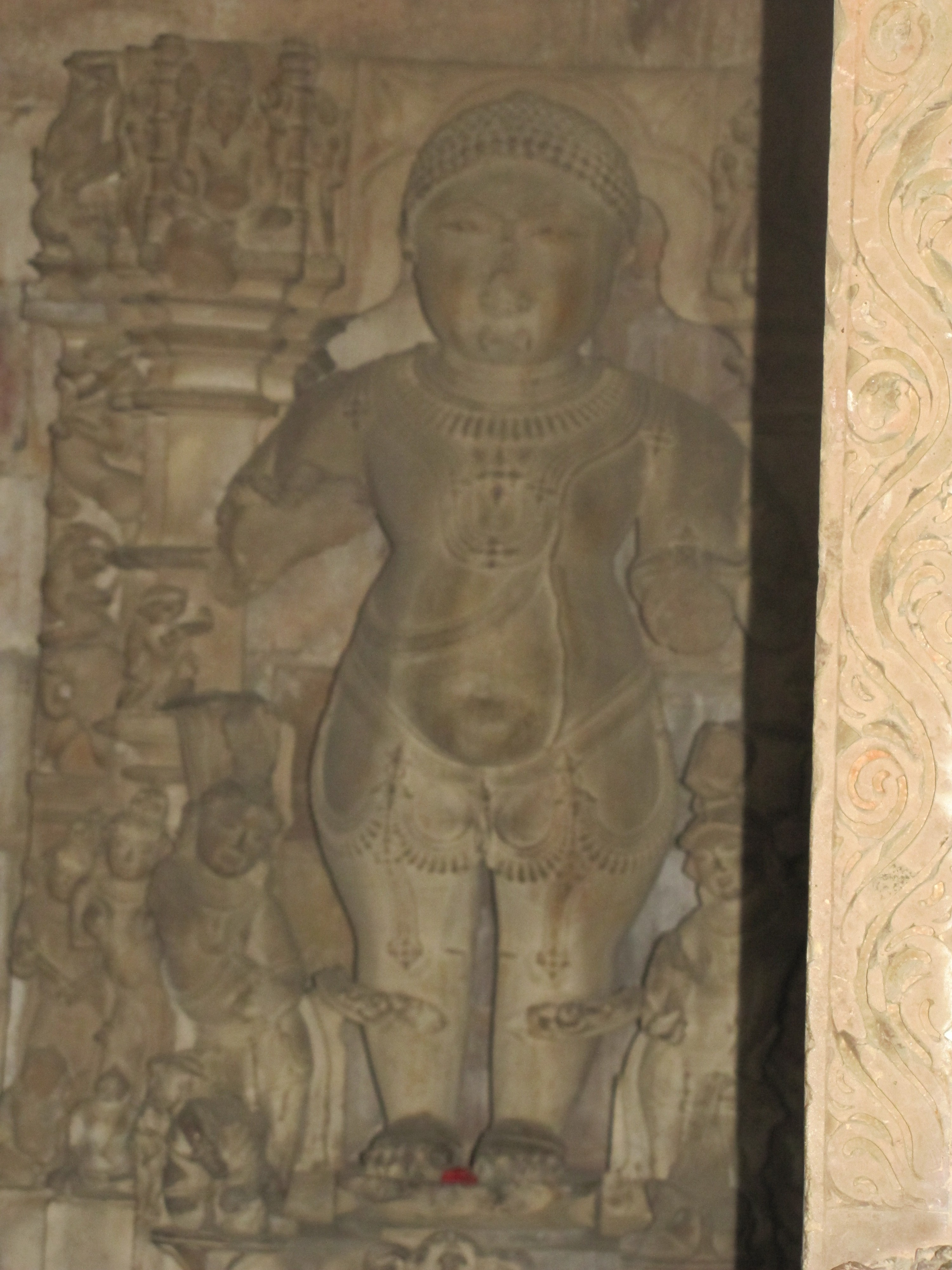
Vamana Idol in Sanctum

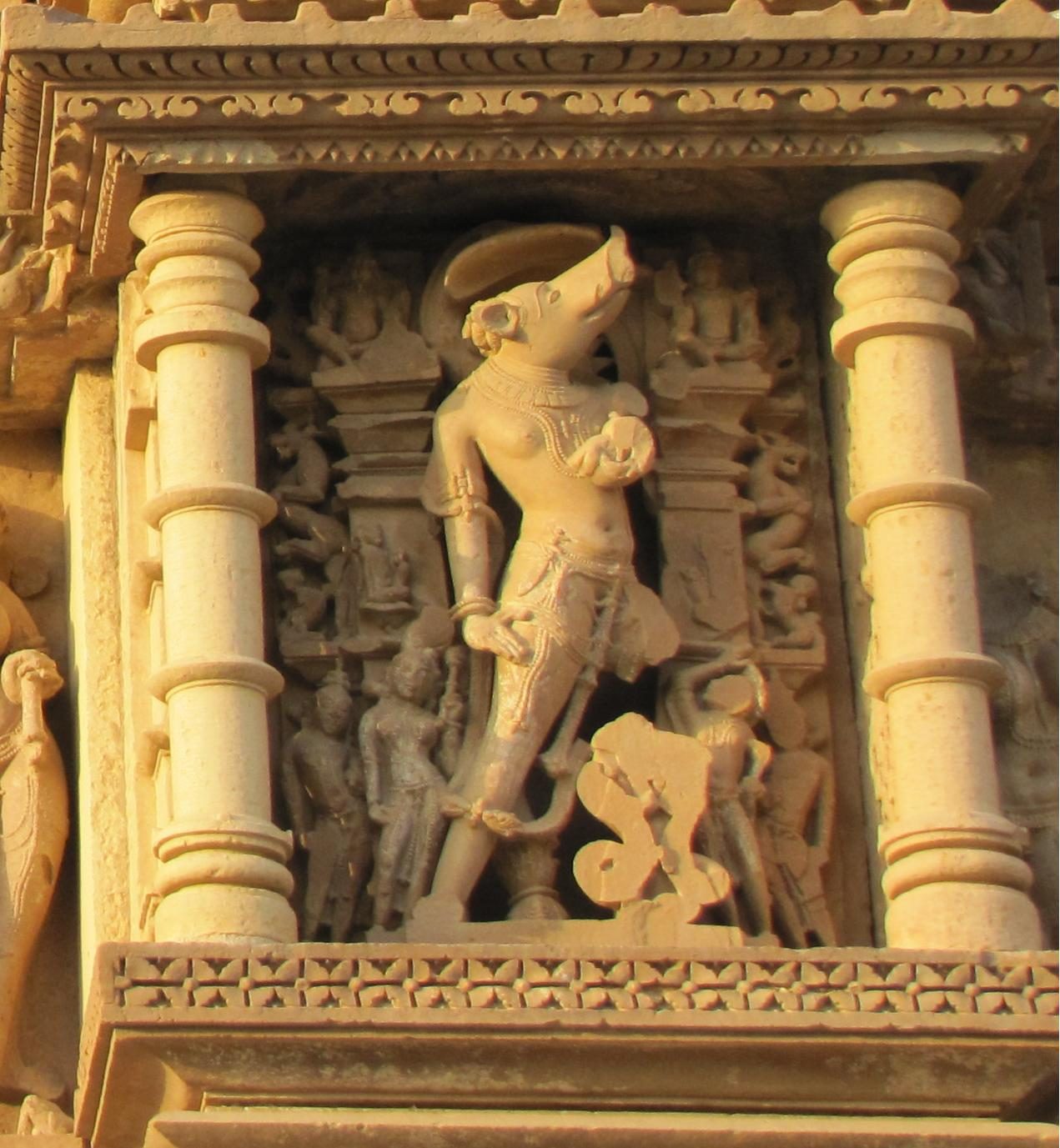
Varaha sculpture on outer wall

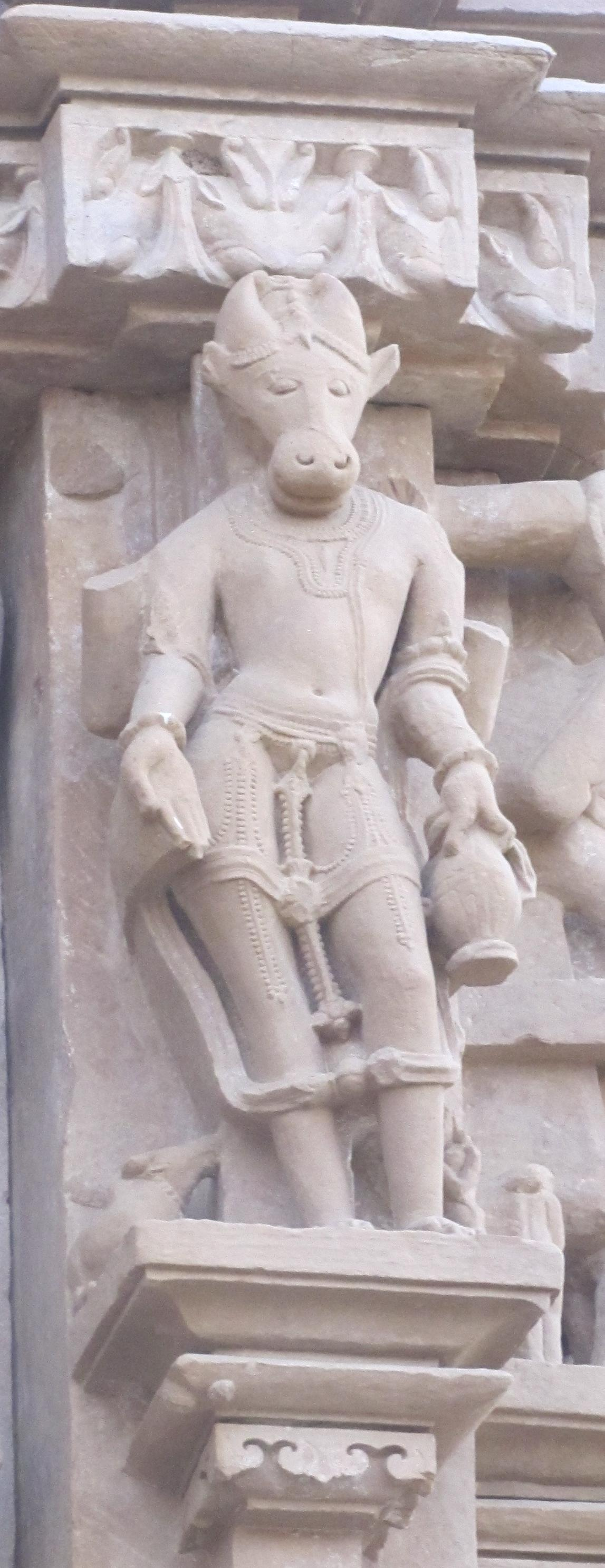
Nandi Sculpture on outer wall
