= Inscriptions of Bhoja =

Historical inscriptions in India

Inscriptions from Bhoja's reign have been found in present-day Gujarat, Madhya Pradesh, Maharashtra and Rajasthan states of India

Bhoja was an Indian king from the Paramara dynasty, whose kingdom was centered around the Malwa region in present-day Madhya Pradesh. By 2003, 12 inscriptions dated to Bhoja's region had been discovered at Banswara, Betma, Bhojpur, Depalpur, Dhar, Kalwan, Mahaudi, Kokapur (in Modasa taluka), Piploda, Tilakwada and Ujjain.

Some of these inscriptions, including those issued by Bhoja himself, are described below. All the inscriptions issued by Bhoja are in Sanskrit language and Nagari script, although some inscriptions feature a few Prakrit words. They are usually in form of copper plates that record land grants. They begin with the auspicious Siddham symbol, and verses praising Shiva. They contain a brief genealogy, naming Bhoja's predecessors as Sindhuraja-deva, Vakpatiraja-deva and Siyaka-deva. Bhoja himself is mentioned as Bhoja-deva, and his titles are given as Parama-bhattaraka, Maharajadhiraja and Parameshvara. All of Bhoja's own inscriptions feature the Paramara emblem of a flying Garuda (with a bird's head and a man's body). The Garuda is shown holding a cobra snake in its left hand, about to strike it with his right hand. The grant records are usually followed by benedictive and imprecatory verses (the latter curse the person who does not honour the grants made in the inscriptions). Bhoja's own inscriptions end with his royal sign-manual.

== 1011 CE Modasa copper-plates ==
This inscription is in the form of two copper-plates. It is dated 1067 VS. The exact date corresponds to 6 May 1011 CE, assuming Karttikadi convention practiced in Gujarat (Kartik is the first month of the year in this convention). In 1944, R. P. Soni found this inscription in possession of a bania widow at Kokapur village of Modasa taluka in Gujarat. The widow could not remember when and how she got these plates.

The two plates contain 16 and 5 lines respectively. The inscription begins with the Siddham symbol, followed by the date and the Paramara genealogy. It records the grant of agricultural land situated in the Sayanapataka (modern Shenvad) village of Mohadavasaka (modern Modasa) sub-division. The name of the donor and the donee is not clear from the surviving record. The land was either donated by Bhoja's subordinate Vatsaraja to a Brahmin named Deddaka; or it was donated by Deddaka to someone else, with Vatsaraja ratifying the grant. The charter then names the witnesses, and also names its writer as Chhadaka, son of Amnaka. The inscription ends with a sign-manual of Vatsaraja. Unlike the rest of the inscription (which is in Sanskrit), the sign-manual is in Prakrit language ("Vachchharajasya").

Vatsaraja is styled as Maharajaputra ("Maharaja's son") in this inscription. Based on this, D. C. Sircar theorized that he was a son of Bhoja. However, other scholars believe that "Maharajaputra" was a feudatory title. H. V. Trivedi identifies Vatsaraja with a ruler of the Chalukya house of Lata. This ruler was the son of Kirttiraja, and might have been a vassal of Bhoja.

== 1018 CE Mahaudi copper-plates ==
This inscription is in form of two copper plates. It is dated 1074 VS; the exact day corresponds to 30 July 1018 CE. The plates were found in possession of one Ratansingh Saindhava of Mahaudi (Jivapur Mahodia) village near Ashta in Sehore district. Saindhava refused to part away with the plates, but archaeologist V. S. Wakankar managed to prepare a rubbing. The actual copper plates are now reported as lost.

The two plates contain 15 and 14 lines respectively, and an image of the Garuda emblem. The inscription begins with the Siddham symbol and two verses praising Shiva, who is named Vyomakesha ("sky-haired") and Smararati ("enemy of the god of love"). It then lists the Paramara kings from Siyaka to Bhoja. Next, the inscription records Bhoja's donation of the Dugayi or Dugaryi village to one Markanda-sarman. The donee was a Brahmin of Vatsa gotra and Vajasaneya shakha; he hailed from Shravanabhadra town of Gauda country. Bhoja is described as a resident of Dhara. It is stated that he took a bath, performed his daily duties and then ordered the village's officials (including pattalika) and residents to render their taxes and a share of the crop produce to the donee. The inscription states that the donation was made on the day of a lunar eclipse, but there was no lunar eclipse on 30 July 1018. It appears that the donation had already been made, and the inscriptional record was created at a later date. The inscription also mentions another date corresponding to 17 September 1018 CE, when the record was formally handed over to the donee.

Next, the inscription contains the traditional benedictive and imprecatory verses. It ends with the sign-manual of Bhoja and the name of Jatasa, who executed the grant.

The identity of the donated village (Dugayi or Dugaryi) is not certain. On basis of similar-sounding names, H. V. Trivedi speculates that it might be the Dupadiya (or Dugariya) village located near Ashta. The identity of Shravanabhadra is also unclear. According to inscription, it was located in the Gauda country. The most famous territory by this name was the Gauda region in present-day West Bengal. Accordingly, Trivedi identifies Sravanabhdra as a place in that state. K. N. Dikshit, while analyzing another inscription, identified Shravanabhadra as Sonbhadra near Kannauj, Uttar Pradesh. Swati Datta notes that Gauda might not necessarily refer to the region in Bengal: other territories in India were also known by this name. The name Gauda was also used as a collective name for the following five territories of north India: Sarasvata (Kurukshetra), Kanyakubja (Kannauj), Gauda (of Bengal), Mithila and Utkala.

== 1020 CE Betma inscription ==
This inscription is in form of two copper plates. It is dated 1076 VS; the exact date is not known, but assuming Karttikadi year, it can be dated to September 1020 CE. The inscription was found by a farmer in Betma, in the early 20th century.

The two plates contain 13 and 14 lines respectively, and the second plate features the Garuda emblem. Like the 1018 CE record, this inscription begins with an auspicious symbol, two verses praising Shiva and the Paramara genealogy. It then states that Bhoja granted the Nalatadaga village to Pandita Delha after performing the daily duties and worshipping Bhavani-pati. The village was located in the Nayapadra territory. D. B. Diskalkar, the first scholar to transcribe and translate the inscription, identified Nala-tadaga with Nar village in Kheda district and Nayapadra with Napad town (now part of Nadiad). Because these places are located nearly 300 km away from Betma, he assumed that the descendants of the donee may have migrated to Malwa. The donee Delha was the son of Bhatta Thatthasika of Kaushika gotra and Madhyandini shakha. He was a migrant from Sthanvishvara (modern Thanesar), and his ancestors lived at Vishala-grama (unidentified).

The donation was made on the occasion of Konkana-Grahana-Vijaya-Parvva ("Konkana Conquest Festival"), to mark Bhoja's conquest of Konkana region. Like the 1018 CE inscription, the record ends with imprecatory and dedicatory verses.

== 1020 CE Banswara inscription ==
This inscription is in form of two copper plates. It is dated to year 1076 of an unspecified era. Assuming that the era is Vikrama Samvat and the year as Karttikadi, the exact date corresponds to 3 January 1020 CE. G. H. Ojha found the plates in possession of the widow of a Thathera (coppersmith) at Banswara. The plates were later moved to the Rajputana Museum in Ajmer.

The content at the start and the end of the inscription is exactly same as the 1020 CE Betma inscription, comprising verses and genealogy. The second plate features the Garuda emblem. The inscription records the donation of a piece of land in Vatapadraka village, which was located in Vyaghradora bhoga (district) of Sthali mandala (province). H. V. Trivedi identifies Vatapadraka with either Barodiya or Barliya village, and Vyaghradora with Bagidora. The Sthali province was probably same as the Vagada region, and might have been named after the present-day Thali village near Arthuna.

The land was donated by Bhoja to a Brahmin named Bhaila, the son of Vamana. The donee belonged to Vashistha gotra and Vajimadhyana shakha; his ancestors were natives of Chhinchchaha-sthana (modern Chhinch). Like the Betma grant, the donation was made on the occasion of Konkana-Vijaya-Parva ("Konkan Conquest Festival"; the word "Grahana" is missing from this particular inscription).

== 1021 CE Ujjain copper plates ==
This inscription is in form of two copper plates. It is dated to 1076 VS, and the exact date corresponds to 24 December 1021 CE. It was found by a farmer in an agricultural field near Ujjain.

As with other inscriptions, it begins with the Siddham symbol, the verses praising Vyomkesha and Smararati (aspects of Shiva) and the Paramara genealogy. The second plate features the Garuda emblem.

The inscription records the donation of the Viranaka village, which was located in Nagaharda-paschima-pathaka subdivision. The identity of the Viranaka village is not certain. H. V. Trivedi identifies Nagaharda-paschima-pathaka as a territory lying to the west of the Nagjhiri stream near Ujjain. The village was donated by Bhoja (who resided at Dhara) to a Karnataka Brahmana named Dhanapati-Bhatta. The donee was the son of Bhatta-Govinda, who belonged to Agasti gotra and Asvalayana shakha. He was a migrant from Srivada in Velluvalla (unidentified).

The inscription ends with five imprecatory verses, and the sign-manual of the king.

== 1022–23 CE Depalpur copper-plates ==
This inscription is in form of two copper-plates. It is dated to 1079 VS, and the exact date corresponds to 19 March 1022 CE (assuming Chaitradi year). Alternatively, the inscription can be dated to 1023 CE (assuming Karttikadi year). In 1931, R. G. Ojha of Indore Museum purchased these plates from one Kishore Singh Kanungo of Depalpur. It is not known how and when did the plates came into possession of Kanungo.

The inscription features the usual genealogy and the Garuda emblem. It then records the donation of some land in Kirikaika village (present-day Karki near Depalpur) located to the west of Ujjayani. The land was donated by Bhoja to a Brahmin named Vachchhala, who was the son of Soshvara, and belonged to the Atreya gotra. The inscription ends with four imprecatory verses and sign-manual of the king.

The inscription suggests that Vacchala had migrated from Manyakheta, which was located in the Western Chalukya territory ruled by Jayasimha II. Swati Datta theorizes that by this time, Jayasimha's kingdom was under attack from the Chola-Kalachuri-Paramara confederacy. The Cholas had previously attacked the Chalukya kingdom during the reign of Jayasimha's ancestor Satyashraya. During this invasion, they are said to have killed the Brahmin men and married off Brahmin girls to the men from other castes. According to Datta, Vacchala might have feared a repeat of this episode in case of a Chalukya defeat. This might have motivated him to seek shelter with Bhoja, who was reputed as a patron of learned Brahmins. Jayasimha was able to repulse the invasion by 1024 CE.

== 1033–34 CE Dhar inscription ==
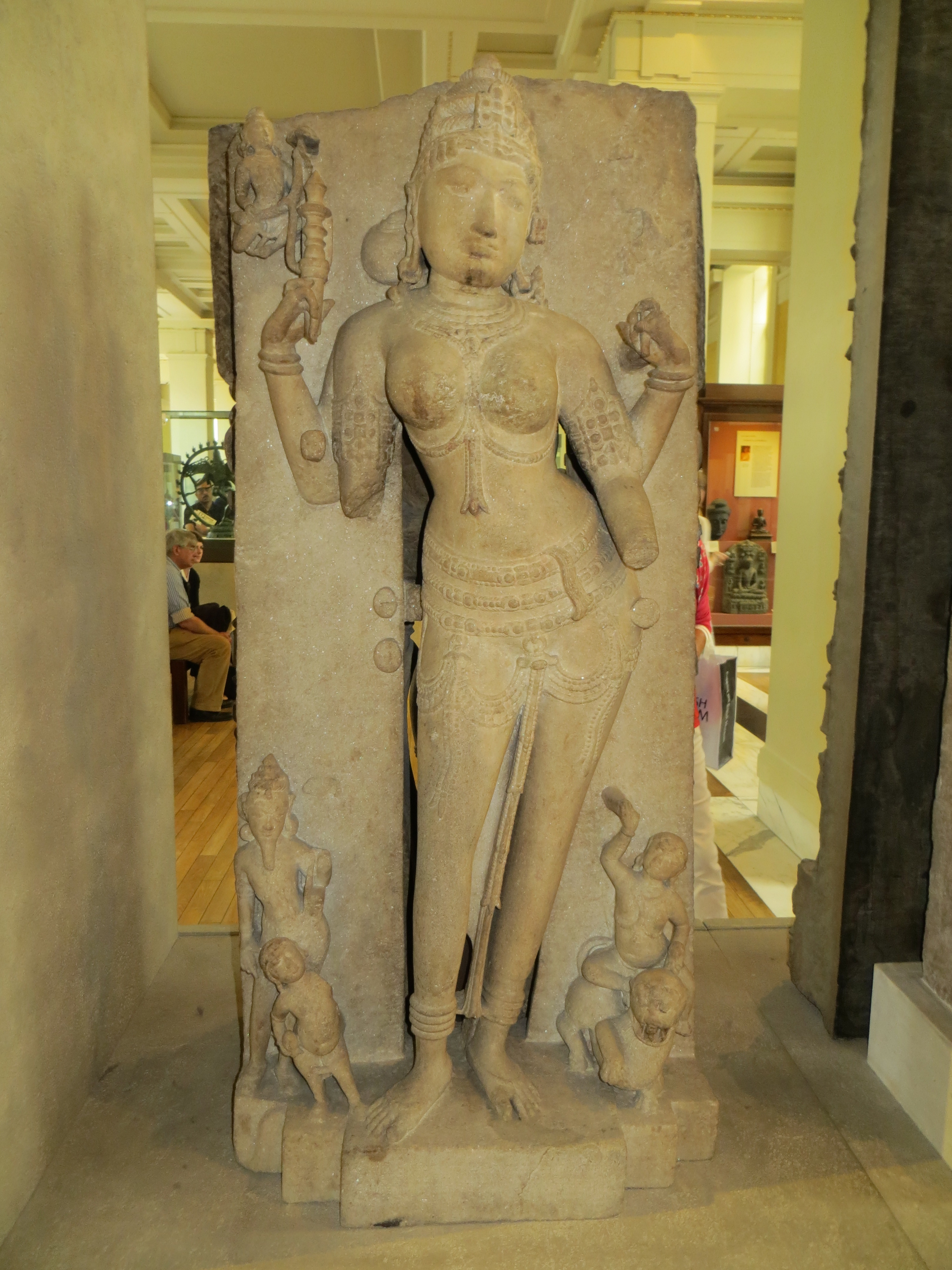
The Ambika statue at British Museum

This 4-line inscription appears on the pedestal of the Ambika Statue from Dhar. The statue was found in 1875 at the ruins of the palace at Dhar. Major General William Kincaid later gave it to the British Museum at London. The record consists of a dedicatory verse in shardulavikridita metre. It records the installation of the statue during the reign of Bhoja. The inscription is dated 1019 (presumably Vikrama Samvat), which corresponds to 1033–34 CE. The inscription was written by Shivadeva, and the sculptor was Manathala, who was the son of the mason Sahira.

In 1924, art historian O. C. Gangoly and archaeologist K. N. Dikshit mistakenly identified the statue as that of Vagdevi (Sarasvati), based on an incomplete reading. They theorized that the statue was from a Sarasvati temple (Bhoj Shala) in Dhar. This mistake was corrected by the Sanskrit scholar Harivallabh Bhayani and Kirit Mankondi in a 1981 article. The image is actually that of the Jain goddess Ambika. The inscription states that Vararuchi commissioned a statue of Ambika after having commissioned statues of Vagdevi and three Jinas. It describes Vararuchi as Bhoja's religious superintendent (Dharmmadhī) of Chandranagari and Vidyadhari (branches of the Jainism). Vararuchi is identified with Dhanapala, a prominent Jain courtier of Bhoja.

== 1046 CE Tilakwada inscription ==
This inscription was probably in form of 3 copper plates, out of which only the last two are now available. It is dated 1103 VS, and the exact date corresponds to 17 November 1046 CE. The two plates were discovered in May 1917 by swimmers and divers in the bed of the Narmada River at Tilakwada, Gujarat.

The surviving portion of the inscription begins with a description of Bhoja's reign. Bhoja is said to have bravely slayed numerous enemy soldiers, and to have enjoyed a long reign. It is possible that the now-lost first plate mentioned Bhoja's genealogy. Next, the inscription describes Bhoja's feudatory and Suraditya, who was a migrant from Kanyakubja, and belonged to the Shravana-bhadra lineage. Suraditya was made the feudal lord of Samgama-khetaka-mandala (present-day Sankheda area) for having killed Bhoja's enemies. The inscription names only one of the enemies defeated by Suraditya: Sahavahana, whose identity is not certain (see Military career of Bhoja#Sahavahana). Suraditya's father Jasoraja (I) had retired and was leading a religious life on the banks of Narmada. His son Jasoraja (II) inherited the feudal lordship.

Next, the inscription records the grant of the Viluhaja village (modern Velpur) and a plot of land in Ghantapalli village (modern Ghantoli). The land was donated by Suraditya's son Jasoraja (or Yashoraja) to Dinakara for worship of a deity called Ghanteshvara. The deity was locally known as Dakshina-Murti Maneshvara, and its temple was located at the confluence of Mana stream with Narmada River. When J.S. Kudalkar visited the village in 1919, he found the ruins of a temple known as Ghanteshvara there. The inscription describes Dinakara as a Shaivite ascetic, who was born in the Shravana-bhadra lineage, and was reputed as an incarnation of Shankara.

The inscription ends with six imprecatory verses and a brief description of Sohika, the composer. Sohika states that he wrote the content at the request of the King Bhoja, and asks for forgiveness for any composition mistakes. He is described as the son of Aiyala, a Kayastha of the Valabhya family.

== Kalwan inscription ==
This inscription comprises three copper plates. It was found in possession of a Bhil at Kalwan (or Kalvan) in Nashik district, and later acquired by the Prince of Wales museum. The inscription does not mention a year: it only states that it was issued on the occasion of a solar eclipse, on an amavasya (dark moon day) in the Chaitra month. In List of Inscriptions of North India edited by D. R. Bhandarkar, the inscription is dated to 17 March 1048 CE, but the text is silent on how this date was assigned. According to H. V. Trivedi, its Devanagari characters resemble those of the 1020 CE Banswara and Betma plates, and therefore, the inscription is probably from the same period.

The inscription begins with a svasti (blessing), followed by a genealogy of Paramara kings from Siyaka to Bhoja. It describes Siyaka's son Vakpati as a highly ranked poet. It states that Bhoja had defeated the rulers of Karnata, Lata, Gurjjara, Chedi and Konkana.

Next, the record describes Bhoja's feudatory Yashovarman, who controlled half of the Selluka (probably modern Satane) town and 1500 villages. The inscription records a donation, which was probably made in Yashovarman's territory. The donation, of several properties, was made by one Ranaka Amma to a Jain monk Suvrata-deva. The properties include plots of land, oil mills, shops and 14 drammas (gold coins). The donee Suvrata-deva is named as a tirthankara Muni of the Kalakeshvara tirtha. The donor Ranaka Amma is described as a samanta of the Ganga family. At the time of the donation, he resided in the Muktapalli village (possibly modern Mohadi) in Audrahadi vishaya (province). He had become a Jain after listening to the teachings of the Śvetāmbara monk Ammadevacharya. His wife Chachchai was born in the Chalukya family. She poured water from a kamandalu, with which Ranaka Amma washed the feet of the Jain monk before making the donation.

== Bhojpur inscription ==
The tirthankara statue at Bhojpur Jain temple

This two-line undated, fragmentary inscription is engraved on the pedestal of the large tirthankara statue at the Jain temple of Bhojpur.

The first verse in the inscription is in Vasantatilaka metre. It eulogies Chandrardha-mauli and Bhoja, who is titled [Rajadhi]raja Parameshvara. The second verse is in Upajati metre. It records the installation of the tirthankara image by Sagaranandin, and mentions that the learned Jain monk Nemichandra performed the installation ceremony.

H. V. Trivedi identifies Chandrardha-mauli as Shiva, and believes that Sagaranandin was devoted to both Jainism and Shaivism.
