= Bhojpur, Madhya Pradesh =

Bhojpur Shiv Temple
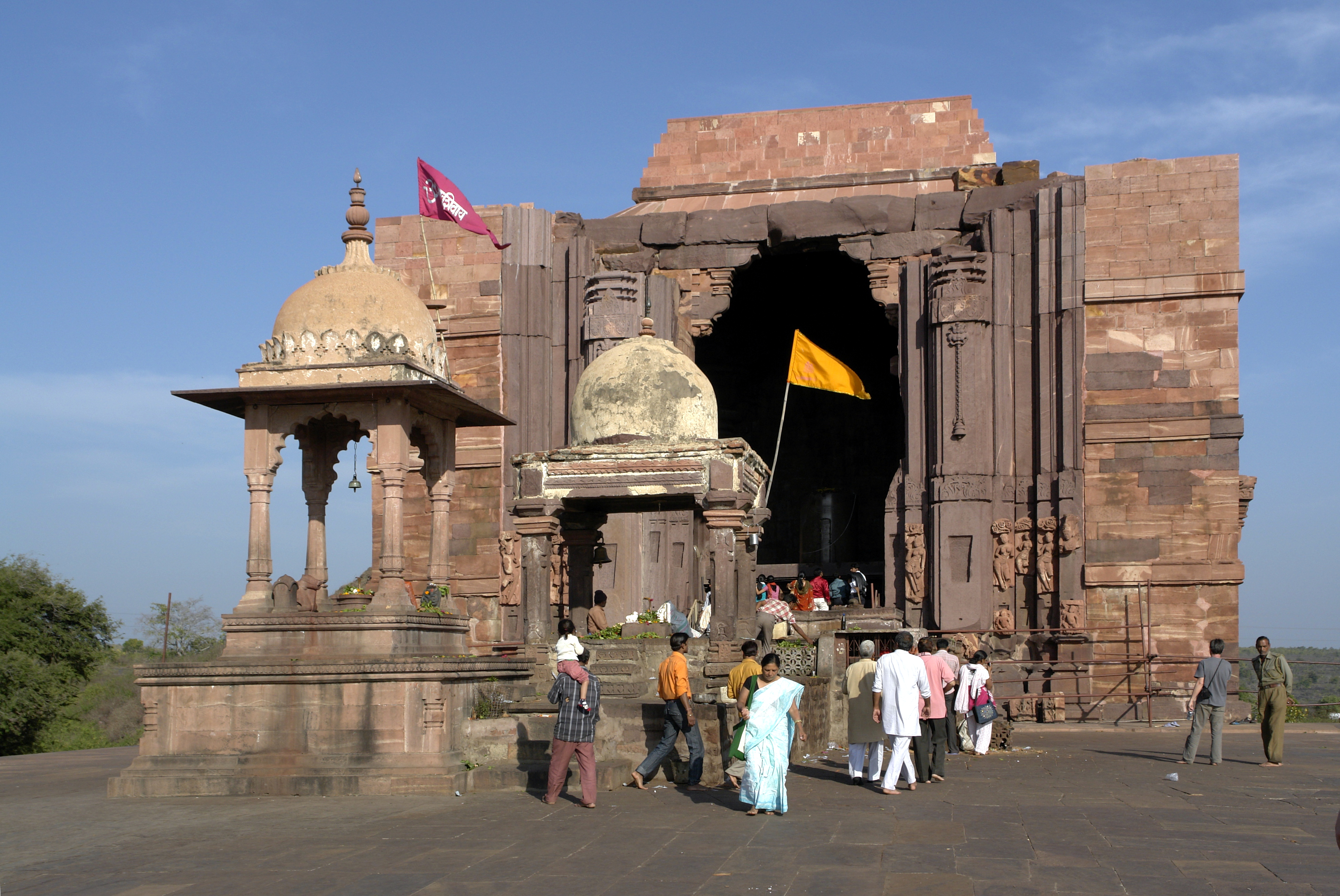
- Bhojeshwar Temple

- Location in Madhya Pradesh, India Bhojpur (India)
- Coordinates: 23°6′54″N 77°35′43″E
- Country: India
- State: Madhya Pradesh
- Named for: Raja Bhoja

Languages
  - Official: Hindi
- Time zone: UTC+5:30 (IST)
- ISO 3166 code: IN-MP
- Vehicle registration: MP

Bhojpur is a town of historical and religious importance in Raisen District of Madhya Pradesh, India.

== Geography and hydrology ==
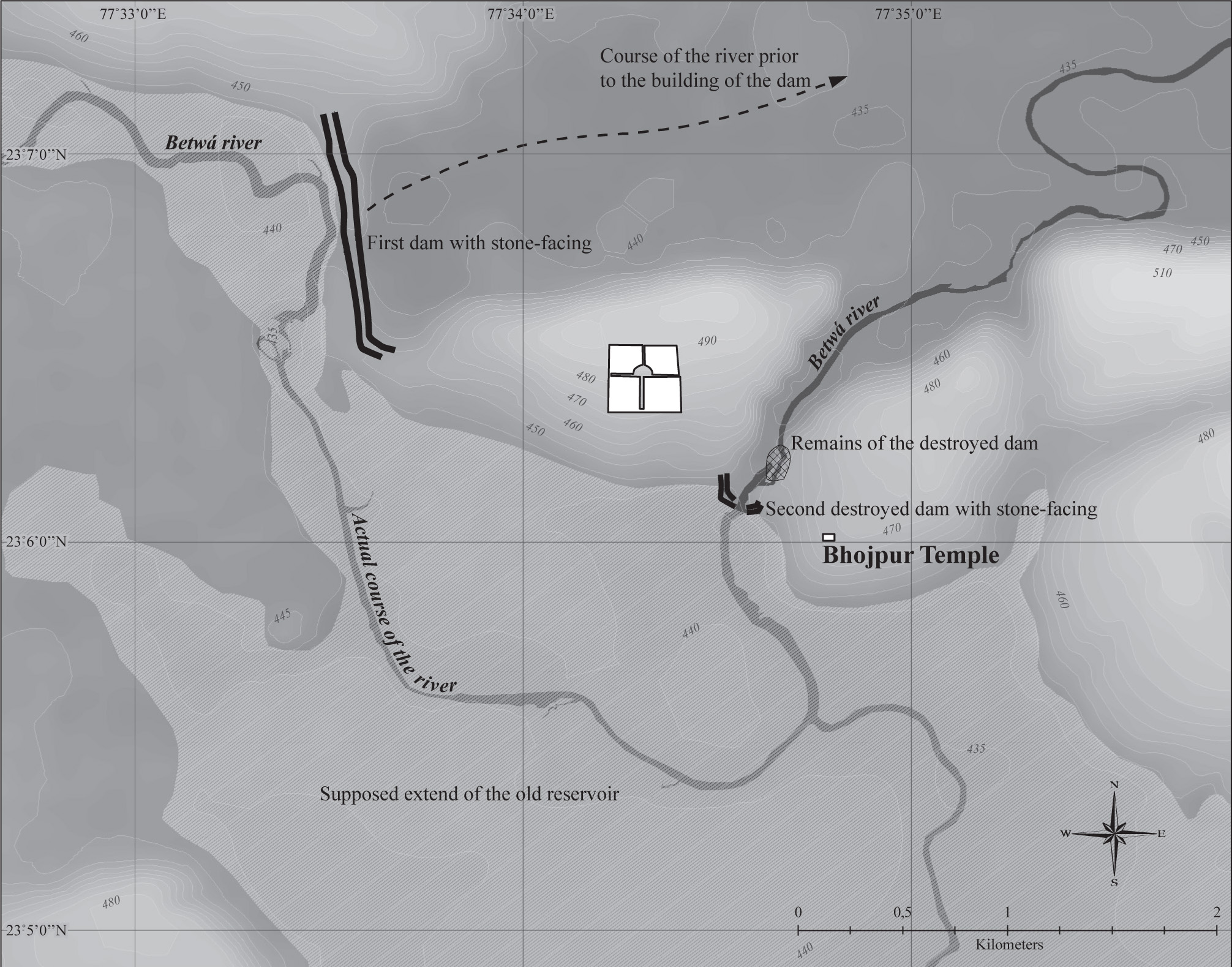
Bhojpur, general plan of the site showing location of temples and dams.

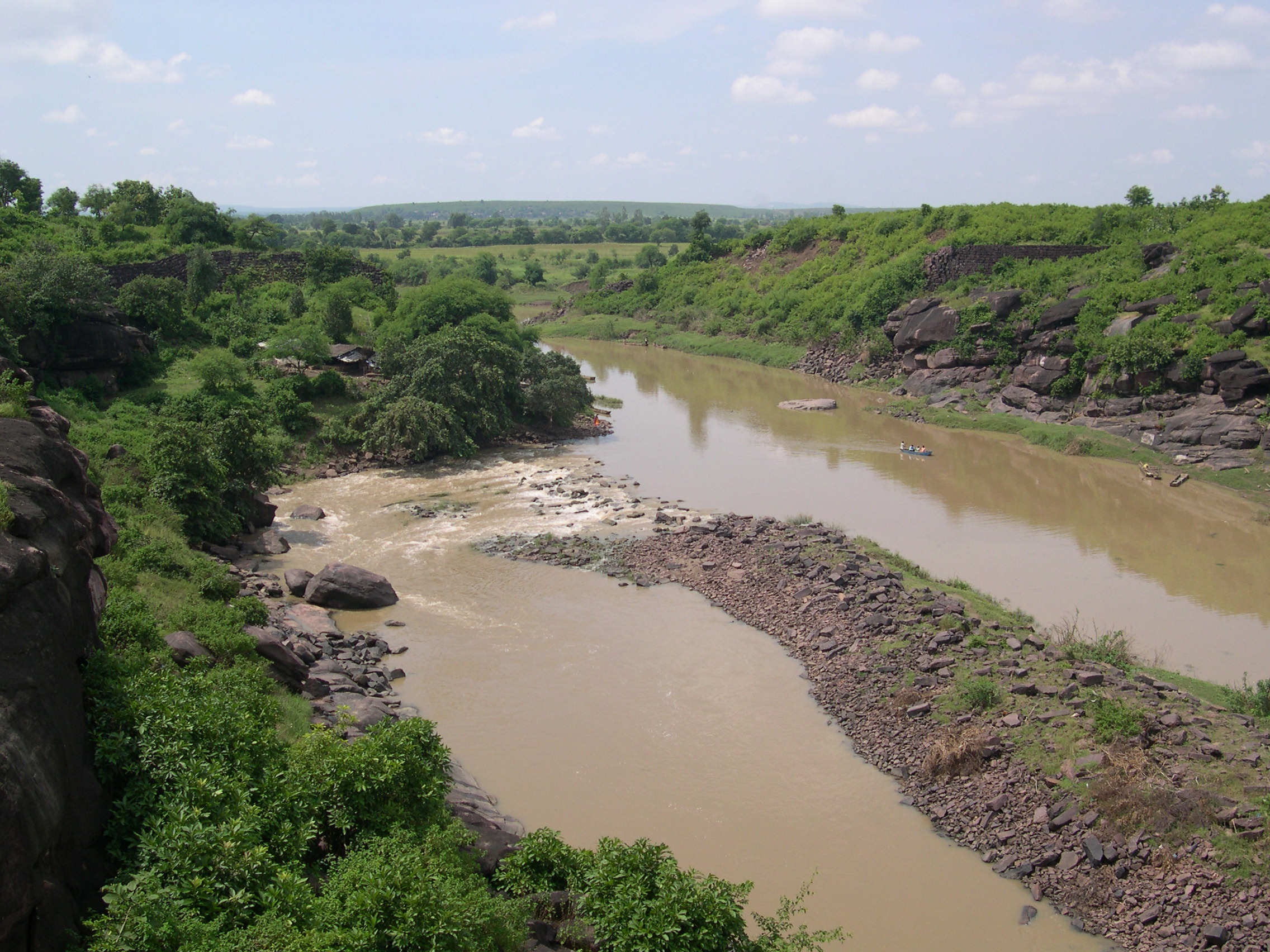
River Betwā at Bhojpur, showing fallen remains of the southern dam.

Bhojpur is situated on the Betwā River, 32 km from Bhopal, the state capital of Madhya Pradesh. The site is located on sandstone ridges typical of central India, next to a deep gorge through which the Betwā River flows. Two large dams, constructed of massive hammer-dressed stones, were built in the eleventh century to divert and block the Betwā, creating a large lake. The approximate size of the lake is shown in the site plan given here.

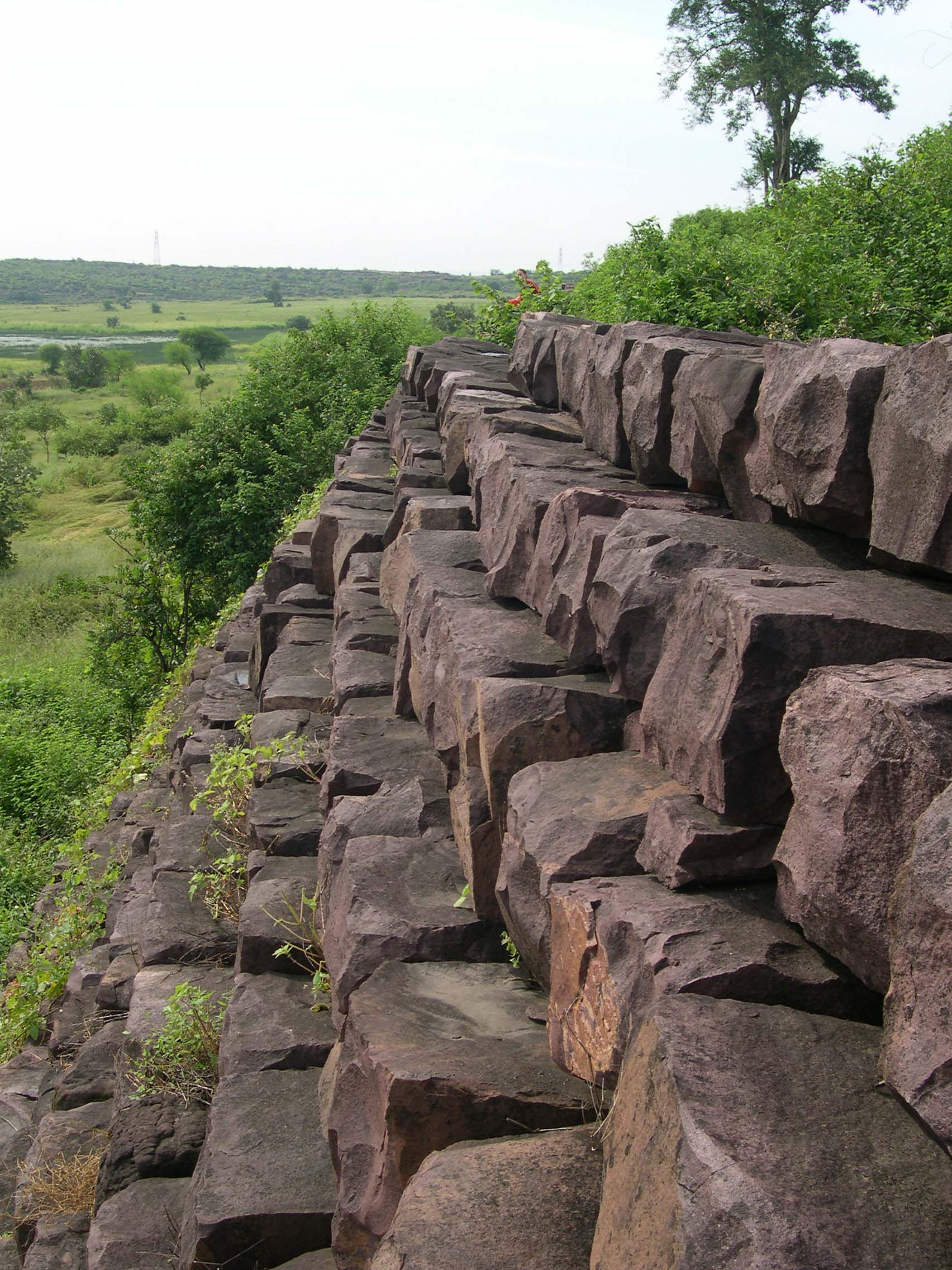
Bhojpur, northern dam showing cyclopean masonry construction.

The dams were constructed of cyclopean masonry on a massive scale. The dam to the north is preserved, but the one immediately below the temple was knocked down by an exceptional Monsoon surge in the mid-eleventh century. A myth about the Bhojpur dams has emerged thanks to the writing of William Kincaid. He mis-interpreted an account in a Persian chronicle (recording that a dam was opened on the orders of Hoshang Shah of Malwa), as referring to Bhojpur, an idea elaborated by U. N. Day in 1965 and repeated in the subsequent years. The account, translated by U. N. Day from Persian, states that the king pulled down a dam at the request of local merchants in Bhopal and Vidisha whose caravans were being raided by bandits who would take refuge at an inaccessible spot protected by the lake. This account refers to the Bhojtal at Bhopal where even today an island in the middle of the lake can be seen. The dam at Bhopal was subsequently repaired and further raised when the Kamlapati Palace was constructed in the eighteenth century.

== History ==
Bhojpur takes its name from king Bhoja (reg. c. 1000–1055 CE), the most celebrated ruler of the Paramāra dynasty. There is no archaeological evidence from Bhojpur before the eleventh century, a fact confirmed by local legends which recount how Bhoja made a vow to build a series of dams "to arrest the streams of nine rivers and ninety-nine rivulets". A location was found in the kingdom that allowed the king to fulfil this vow and the dams were duly built at Bhojpur.

== Places of historical and archaeological importance ==
=== Bhojeśvar or Bhojasvāmin temple ===
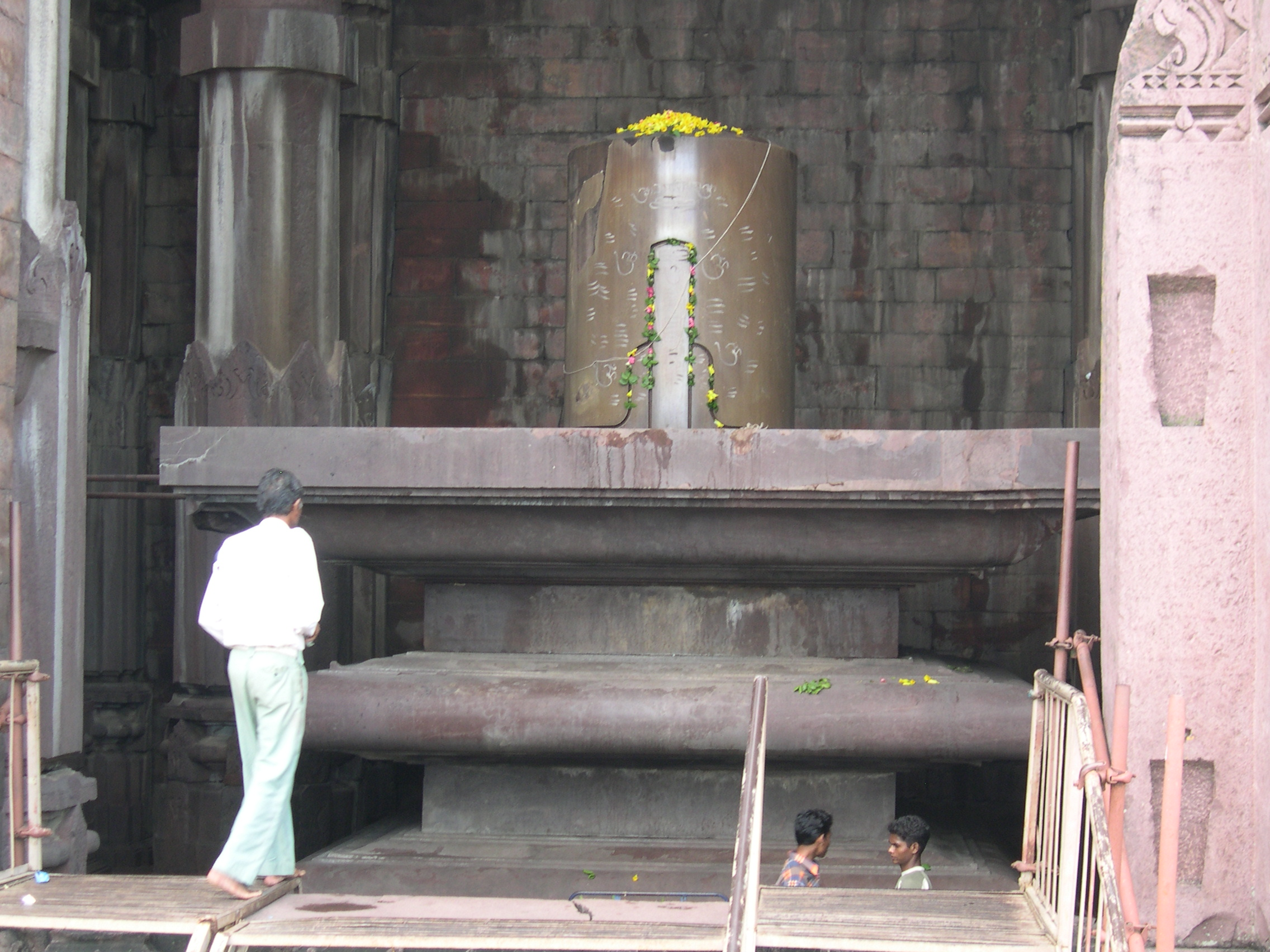
The liṅga at the Bhojasvāmin temple, Bhojpur

Bhojpur is famous for the incomplete Bhojeśvar temple dedicated to Shiva. The site is under the protection of the Archaeological Survey of India as a monument of national importance. The temple houses one of the largest liṅga-s in India, 5.5 m (18 ft) tall and 2.3 m (7.5 ft) in circumference. It is crafted out a single rock. The liṅga was repaired by the Archaeological Survey of India who also added a roof over the top to prevent weather damage.

The attribution of the temple to Bhoja is based on the testimony of Merutuṅga, who reports in the Prabandhacintāmaṇi that Bhoja bestowed on the poet Māgha "all the merit of the new Bhojasvāmin temple that he was about to build himself", and then "set out for the country of Mālava". The style of the sculpture on the building confirms an early to mid-eleventh-century date for the structure.

The building as it stands consists of the inner cella or garbhagṛha, supported by massive pillars, surmounted with an elegant corbelled dome. The outer walls and superstructure of the temple were never built, but unfinished parts lie nearby.

=== Quarries and rock drawings ===
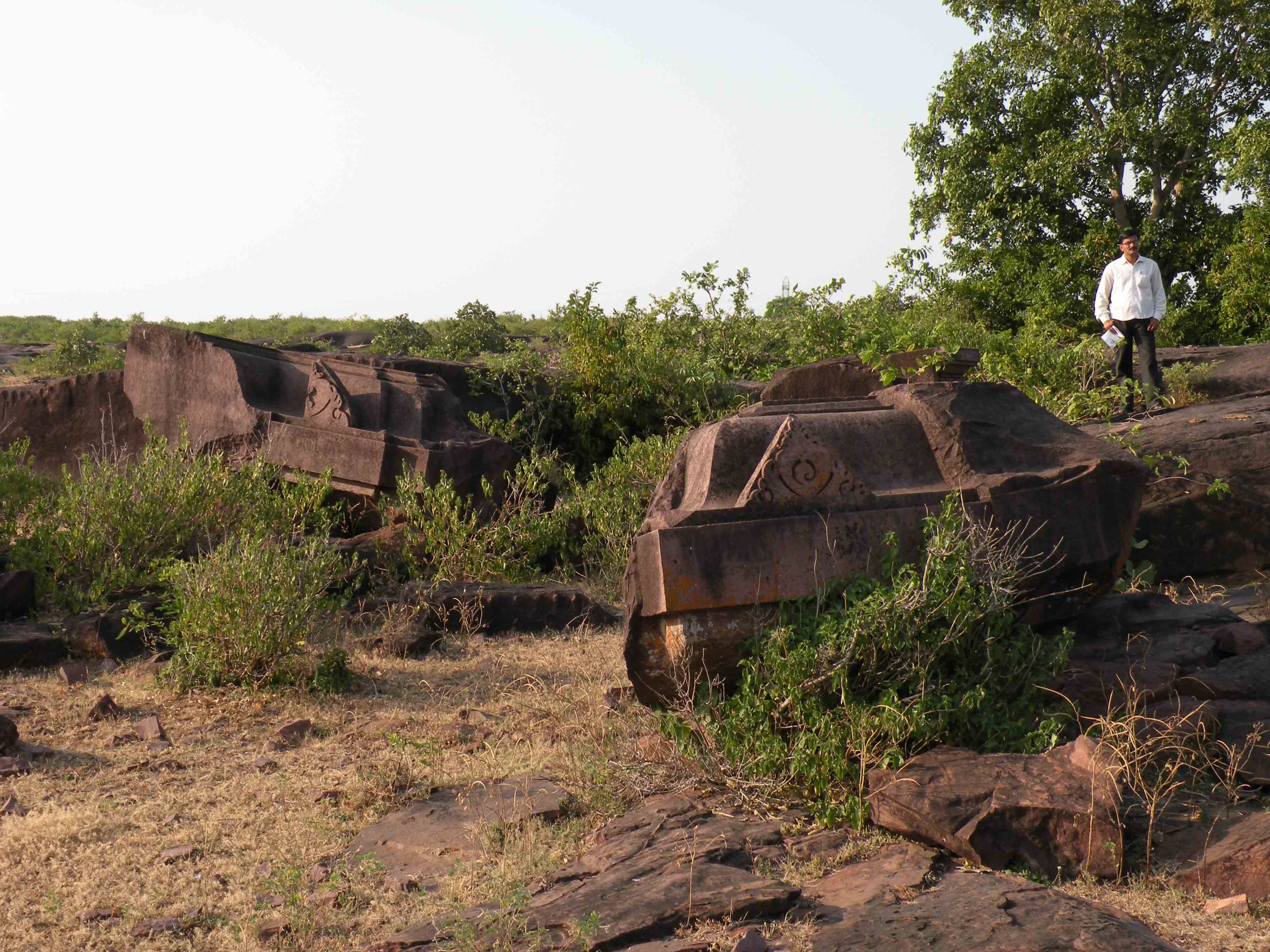
Architectural fragments in one of the quarries at Bhojpur

The temple at Bhojpur is unique in being left unfinished, with a series of large architectural parts still located in the quarries where the stones were cut and fashioned. In addition, there are a significant number of architectural drawings engraved on the flat surfaces of the quarry showing mouldings, pillars, and temple plans. Also of note is the large earthen ramp behind the temple which shows how medieval craftsmen raised the large blocks of stone into position. The drawings and architectural parts have been subject to in-depth study and with a book on the subject published by the Indira Gandhi National Centre for the Arts.

=== Jain temples ===
Idols at the unfinished Jain Temple, Bhojpur

Bhojpur also has an unfinished Jain temple containing a 6 metres (20 ft) tall statue of Bhagwan Shantinath and two statues of Bhagwan Parshvanath (left) and Bhagwan Suparshvanatha (right). On the base of the central images of Lord Shatinath there is an inscription mentioning king Bhoja, the only epigraphic evidence connecting Bhoja to the site. The Suparshanath image on left has an inscription date samvat 1157 which mentions Naravarman, the nephew of king Bhoja, and mentions that the two smaller idols were installed by the grandson of Nemichandra of Vemaka community, who had installed the main image in the middle The same temple complex hosts shrine for Ācārya Manatunga who wrote Bhaktamara Stotra.

==== Main Temple & Idol ====
This huge temple was established in year 1100 AD. The miraculous idol of principal deity Bhagwan Shantinath in standing posture, 6.25 metres (20.5 ft) feet in height, installed in the huge sanctum of this temple. On the both sides of this idol, 2 standing beautiful idols of Bhagwan Parshvanath & Suparshvanath (7th Teerthankar) 8 feet in height each are installed. Near the feet of Bhagwan Shantinath, artistic whisk bearers are carved on both sides.

=== Cave of Pārvatī ===
Immediately opposite the temple, on the west side of the gorge facing the Betwā, is a rock-shelter or cave, now occupied by religious mendicants. Popularly known as Pārvatī's Cave, the cave contains a number of sculptures and architectural fragments dating to the eleventh century.

=== Remains of Bhoja's Royal Palace ===
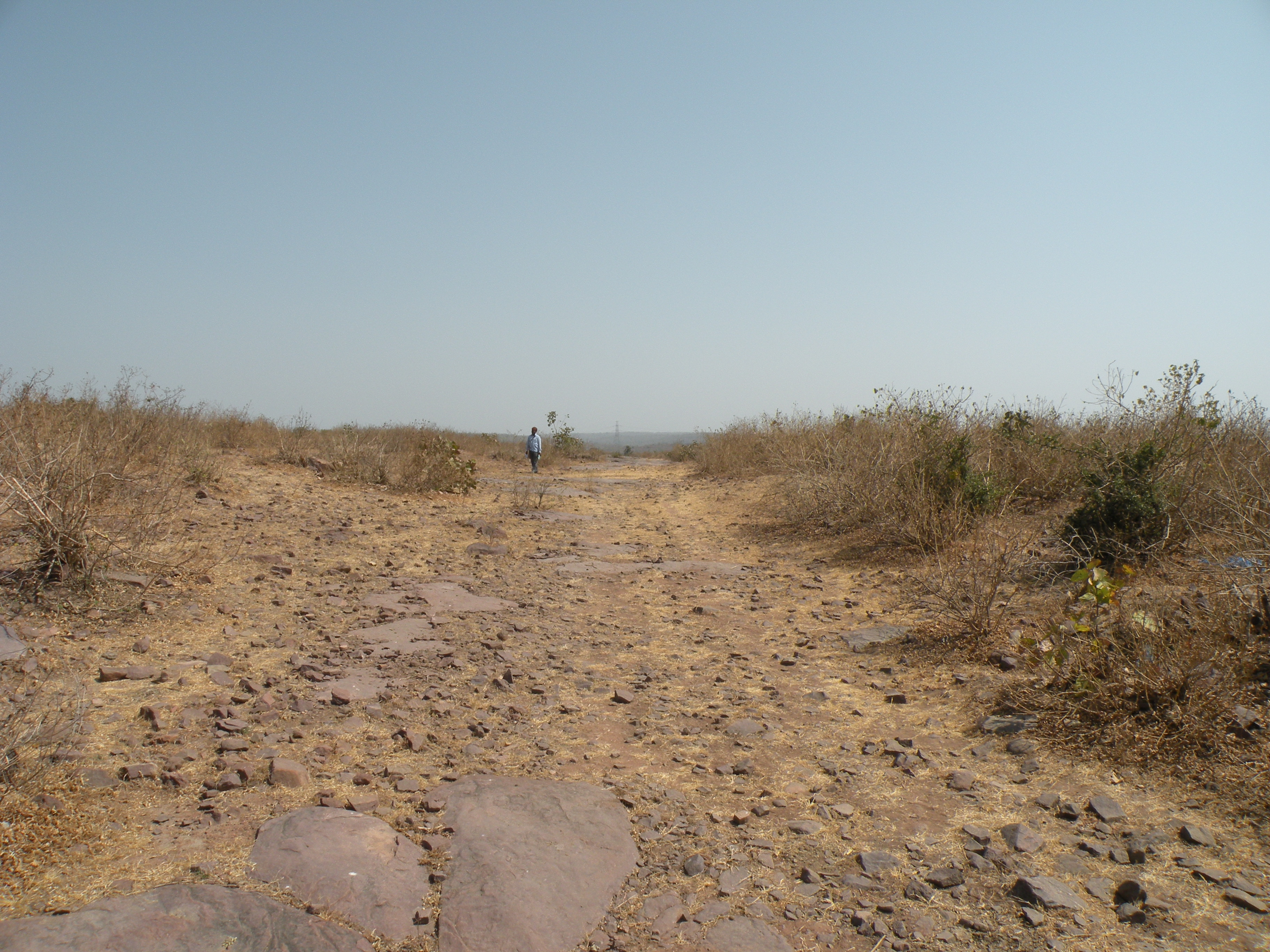
One of the avenues in the ruins of the royal palace at Bhojpur

On the low plateau above the Cave of Pārvatī and opposite the Bhojpur temple are the remains of Bhoja's palace. Only the foundations survive. The complex is laid out as a grid in a square, with a courtyard in the centre (see site plan above). It is oriented on an exact north-south axis as prescribed in the Samarāṅganasūtradhāra, an architectural treatise ascribed to Bhoja. Among the many features of interest are unfinished carved blocks and graffiti engraved on the rock floor. The latter includes diagrams for games and a series of names dating to the eleventh century and later. The palace is a unique survival, being the only medieval building of its kind in northern India. Its association with Bhoja and its close conformity to a text ascribed to the king mark it out as a site of national and international cultural importance. The site of the palace, like the neighbouring dams, is unprotected. The remains of the palace are being slowly destroyed as local people collect stones for modern building purposes.

== Cultural activities and festivals ==
Every year, on the occasion of Maha Shivaratri, a big mela is organized at Bhojpur.

== Gallery ==
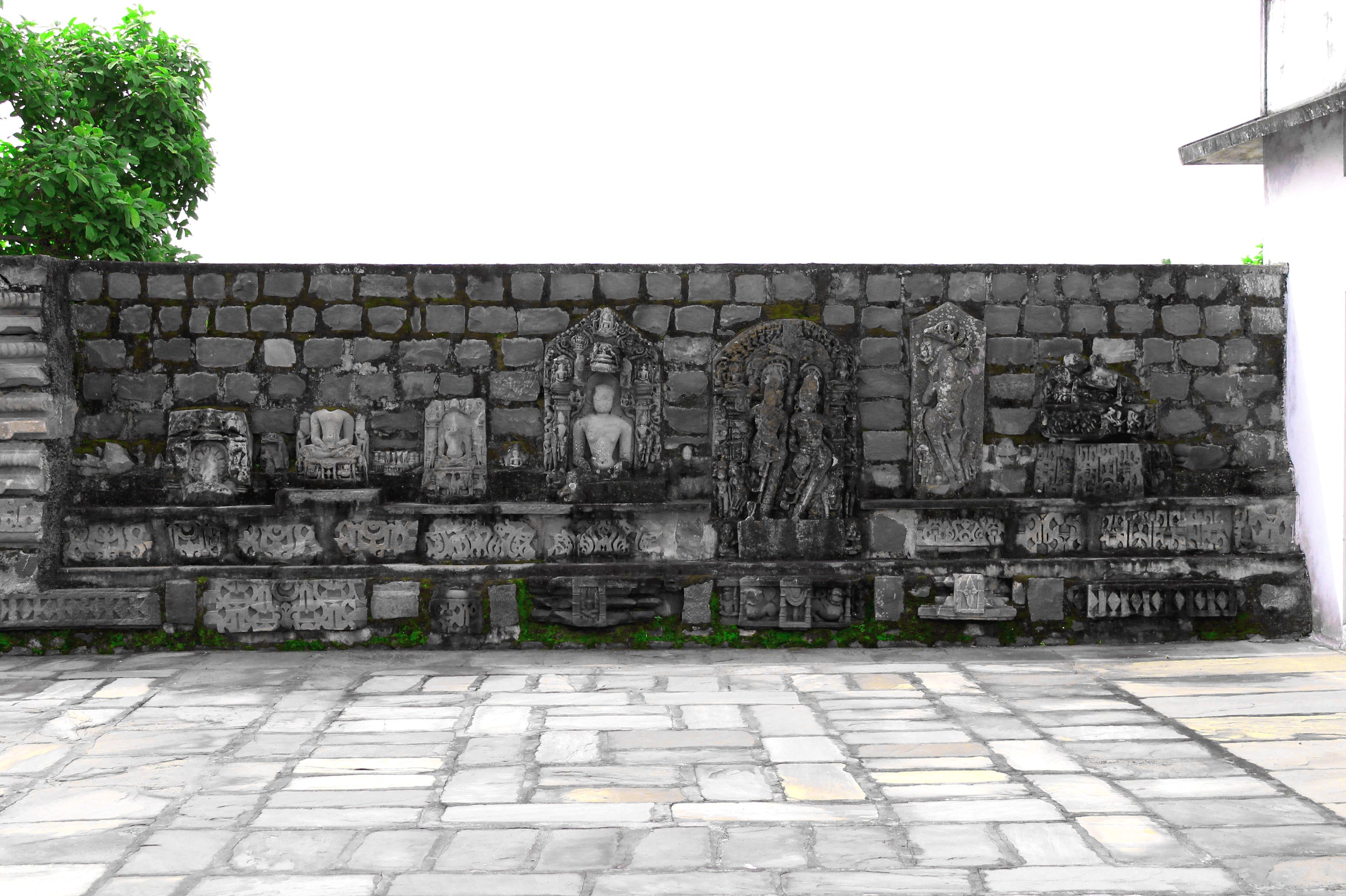
Jain temple old statue

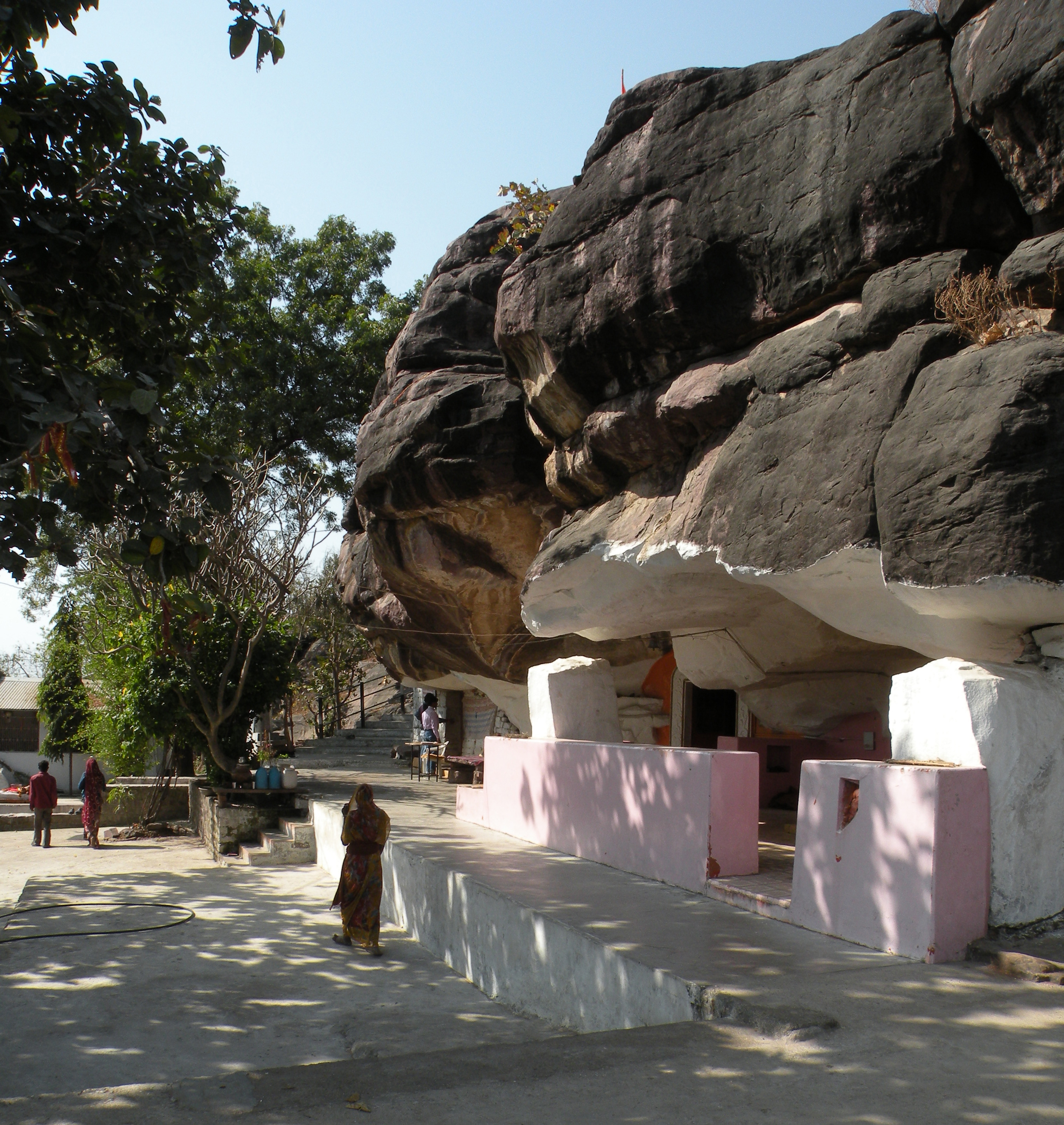
Rock shelter at Bhojpur popularly known as Pārvatī's Cave

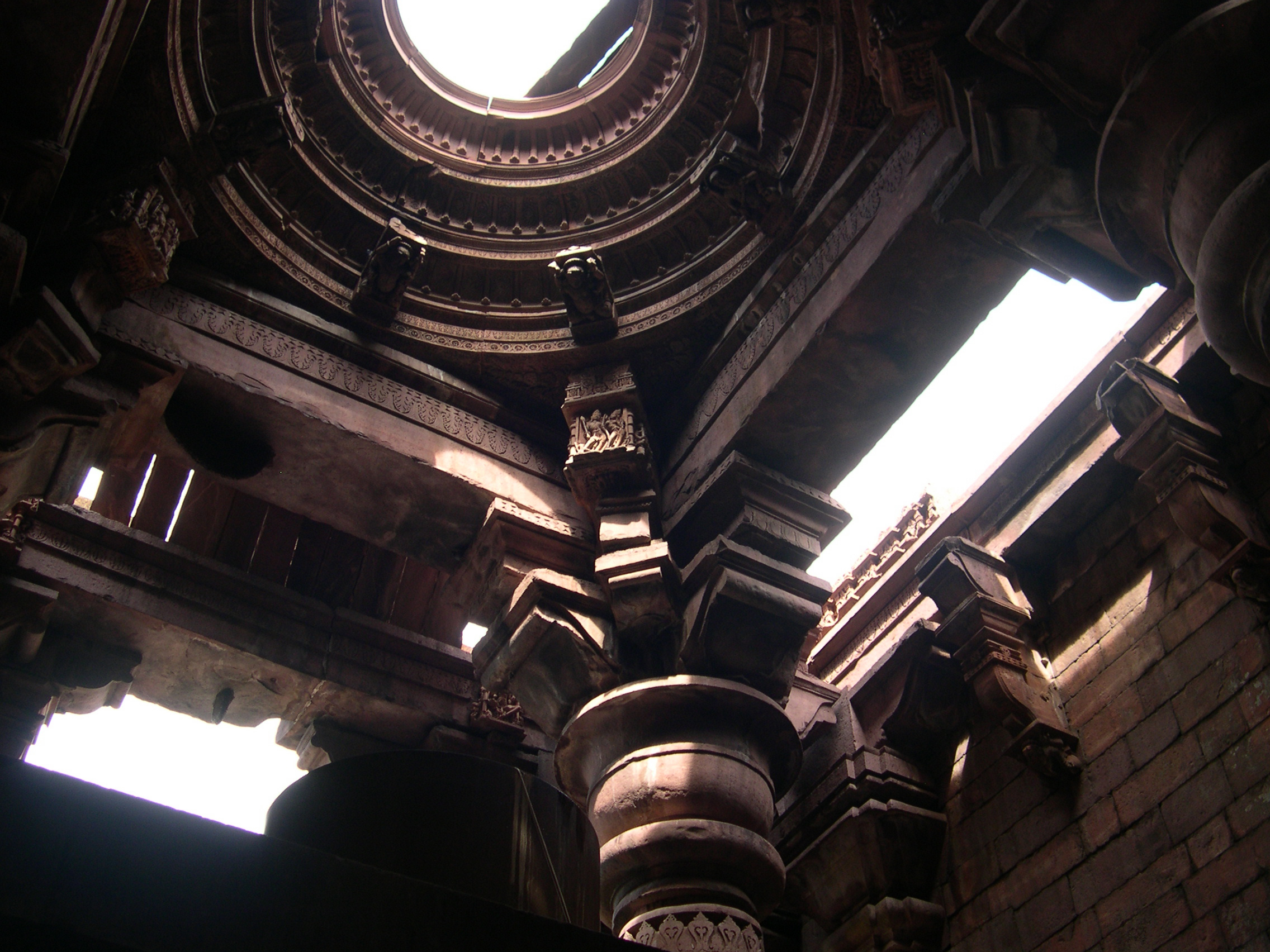
Interior of the temple dome at Bhojpur, before conservation

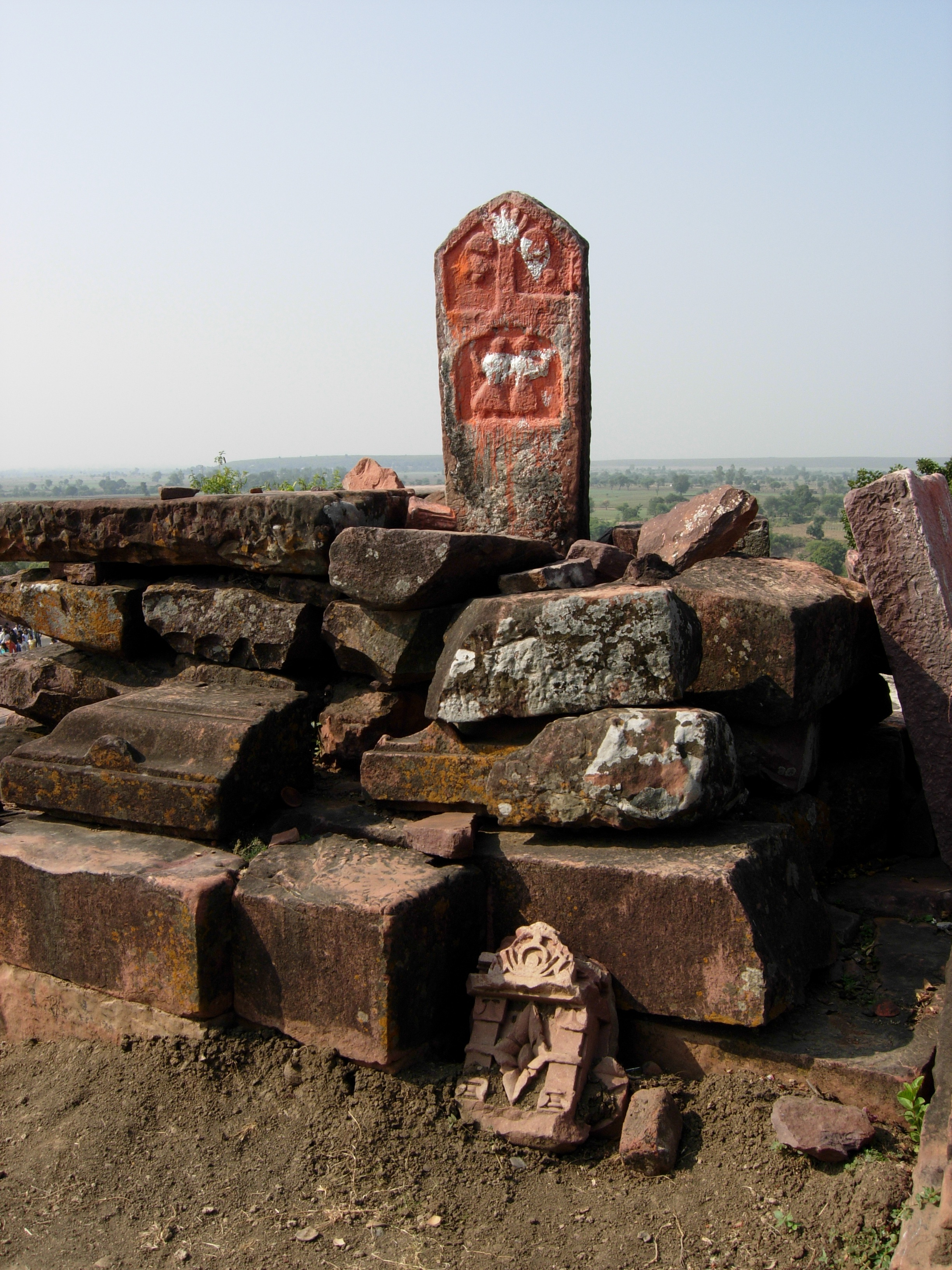
Satī pillar beside the Bhojpur temple, probably 18th century.
