= Betma =

Betma Baitmah
- Town
- Location in Madhya Pradesh, India Betma (India)
- Coordinates: 22.68°N 75.62°E
- Country: India
- State: Madhya Pradesh
- District: Indore
- Tehsil: Depalpur

Population (2001)
  - Total: 12,529

Languages
  - Official: Hindi
- Time zone: UTC+5:30 (IST)
- Postal Index Number: 453001

Betma is a town and a nagar panchayat in Indore district in the state of Madhya Pradesh, India.

== History ==
A 1020 CE copper-plate inscription of the Paramara king Bhoja was found in Betma.

=== Kanungo's of Betma - Jagir pargana ===
In the Ain-i-Akbari Betma is one of the mahal and old town of Malwa region and pargana of Kayastha zamindari granted from the Malwa Sultanate in (Hijri AD 1101) (Vikram Samvat 1747) 1689 CE.

In 1733 CE Maratha's captured Malwa and Changed the revenue system. In 1756 Malharrao transferred some villages from Betma pargana 12 villages remained with Kanungo Rai Bakhat Singh and other Villages transferred to Sagour pargana or Depalpur.

=== Wagh Maratha Jagirdar of Betma ===
Malhar Rao Holker granted Betma to his feudal Sardar Madhorao Wagh for local revenue collection in 1757.

=== Chouhan's of Betma ===
After some years, a Chouhan Rajput appointed Mandloi raja of some villages in Betma (Ugai Thikanedar) from holkars of Indore princely estate. This family traced their ancestry from Raja Hariraj Singh Chouhan brother of Samrat prithviraj singh chouhan.

It is believed that Sikh Guru Nanak Dev, during his second Udasi, stayed in Betma for six months. In The age of Mughal era Betma was a pargana of Qanungoh (kanungo) hakh Dastoor 26 village under this pargana. Thakur Dungar Singh Nigam was the appointed Betma pargana jagirdar and received the sanad & title of kanungo granted by the akbar's court Mandu sarkar. By caste he was a kastariya Kayastha. The family traced their ancestry from Thakur Ganrajdas he was the diwan of rana udaipur prithviraj singh in between 1600 and 1700 century .in holkars time holkars change the revenue policy and holkars appointed to madhorao Wagh for Betma local revenue collection. After some years a chouhan rajputs appointed revenue agent (thikanedar) by the agent of holkars Wagh mansabdar and pargana kanungo of Betma they were decently enjoyed their work in company raj and British India also.

Origin of name is possibly from an event where a significant woman sat which got called ‘baith-ma’ (sit mother).

== Education ==
Primary and secondary education in Betma is offered by various schools which are affiliated to either Madhya Pradesh Board of Secondary Education or CBSE.

== Geography ==
Betma is located at 22.68°N 75.62°E. It has an average elevation of 541 metres (1774 feet).

== Demographics ==
As of 2001 India census, Betma had a population of 12,529. Males constitute 51% of the population and females 49%. 17% of the population is under 6 years of age.

== Places of interest ==
- Betma Sahib Gurudwara is of historical significance for Sikhs. It is believed that Guru Nanak Dev Ji visited this place.
- Aman Chaman Mata mandir is also of historical significance to Hindu devotees. All religions worship here. It is main center of betma nagar, here people celebrated a huge dushera festival in all over mp.
- Saeyad Sarkar a Sufi Saint and Spiritual guru resides in village Daulta Bad 10 km away on Depalpur road from Betma. People of different religion from all parts of India visit him to gain spiritual knowledge and blessings.
- Isa Ji Shaheed is a historical significance of Dawoodi Bohra's . Peoples of other religions also worship there to gain the blessings of Isa Ji Shaheed. Dargah e Isa Ji Shaheed is situated in Lakhera Bakhal in Betma.

== Transport ==
The nearest airport is Indore.
