= Ganna Smirnova =

Ganna Smirnova (from Kyiv, Ukraine) is a Ukrainian professional dance exponent and research scholar of Bharatanatyam (form of Indian classical dance), and a disciple of Guru Smt Jayalakshmi Eshwar. She is also the founder and the Art Director of Indian Theater Nakshatra in Kyiv. She is one of the leading exponents of Indian classical dance "Bharatanatyam" in the eastern Europe and performs and teaches extensively.

She is a post-diploma graduate of Institute of Fine Arts "Abhinayaa – Aaradhana", New Delhi, where she learned under Guru Jayalakshmi Eswar under the ICCR scholarship. She has learned under her Guru under the Guru- shishya Parampara for more than six years. She is one of the very few non-Indian artists who have been empaneled under the ICCR. Her performances have received positive reviews from dance critics both in India and abroad.

== Early life and training ==
Since childhood, Ganna has been studying ballet and the Ukrainian national dance under the direction of Lilya Melnichenok, a dancer and former soloist with the Virsky Ensemble. As a student she studied eastern philosophy and practiced yoga, Tai-zi-chuan, and Shigun. Academically, she earned a degree in Jurisprudence from Taras Shevchenko National University and later went on to defend her PhD at the same university.

In 1998, Ganna received the scholarship under (Indian Council for Cultural Relations) of India to study Indian classical dance Bharatanatyam in New Delhi, while in India she received positive reviews from legendary dance critic Subuddu, Mrs. Leela Venkatraman and Dr Sunil Kothari.

For the five years that she was in India (1998–2003), she had intensive training in Bharatanatyam, and she practiced the Carnatic Vocal music under Guru Vasantha Sundaram and Chhau under Guru Janmey jai Sai Babu. She also received introductory knowledge of Kuchipudi from Guru Seetha Naagjyothi in Delhi Tamil Sangam. Yet Bharatnatyam remained her primary focus. She took part in the ballet compositions of her guru, as well as engaging in lectures and demonstrations and regularly performing solo concerts in Delhi and other cities of India.

== Career ==
Having returned to Kyiv in 2003, Ganna established a theatre of Indian dance, Nakshatra, at T. G. Shevchenko University. Nakshatra theatre has been working to promote Indian art and culture in Ukraine and to foster greater understanding between the two countries. Ganna dedicated eight years to raising cultural awareness about India in Ukraine. Indian Theater Nakshatra conducts lessons of Indian classical dance and yoga, organizes festivals of Indian classical dance and music, exhibitions of paintings by Indian and Ukrainian artists, lecture demonstrations and master classes by gurus, student performances, and lectures and training in other cities of Ukraine.

Establishment of the Nakshatra theatre in the year 2003, in the year 2004 The Indian dance drama Devadarpana was launched in the Musical theatre in Ukraine.

On 13–15 April 2005, Ganna with the help of the embassy of India in Ukraine and the Indian community organized the first international festival of Indian classical dances named Nrityaanjali. the artists came from numerous countries and it was first of its kind in the whole of the CIS region. She invited more than 30 amateur groups comprising more than 200 in number to go through the lecture demonstration and workshop by these artists and scholars and witness the performances of the dancers from Russia, India, Ukraine, Sweden, the Netherlands, Singapore, France presenting the mastery of their efforts in this evening. The event was organized in the Kyiv National Academic Theatre of Operetta.

In 17–19 May 2006, the second edition of the Nrityaanjali festival was organized and participants came from more than seven countries. The first lady of Ukraine Katherina Yushchenko and a distinguished audience sat for this great festival of India that ran for 3 days. The festival that Nakshatra organized was coupled with the painting exhibition and the scientific seminar conducted in the T.G. Shsevchenko national university of Ukraine. Indian music director Pt. Chaurasia and Pt. Bhajan Sopori also performed. The event was organized in the Operetta Theatre of Kyiv.

On 24 October 2006, the United Nations foundation day Nakshatra Theatre organized the musical dialogue of cultures presenting Ustad Aashish Khan and Ronu Majumdar in the Operetta Theatre. The event was organized by the Operetta Theatre of Kyiv. This activity has won laurels from the friends and onlookers alike.

In the year 2009, the great maestro of Indian classical music [[Thumbnail for Hariprasad Chaurasia Hariprasad Chaurasia|Pt. Hari Prasad Chaurasia]] was invited on the celebration of the traditional Indian new year the program was so aptly named "The wind supreme". The event was organized in the National Philharmonic Hall in Kyiv.

In December 2009, the musician and master of the Sarod, Ustad Amjad Ali Khan visited to Kyiv. With the support from the Indian Council for Cultural Relations and the Embassy of India in Ukraine, Ustad performed at the Ganna's Nakshatra Theatre on 8 December. Before that, Ustad Amjad Ali Khan and his sons visited the university where they were facilitated by the head of the University and where Ustad was awarded the Medal of Honor, being the very first Asian musician to receive such a distinction.

In March 2010, Ganna embarked on her performing tour to India and had sterling performances in the India International Center 3 March, Azad Bhawan of ICCR on 5 March and on the celebration of the International Women's day on 8 and 9 March in Jawaharlal Nehru University. She went on to perform in Natyanjali festival the Chidambaram dance festival in the pious Maha Shivarathri day on 13 March in the world-famous Natraja Thillai temple, in Kumbhakonam on 15 March, and in the Brihadiswarar temple on 17 March 2010 on the celebration of the 1000 years of the temple establishment, a rare honor for a European artiste to perform in such places. In the month of August 2010 she was invited by the Indian Cultural Center of Moscow for the presentation of her book "Indian temple dances – Tradition, Philosophy and legends" besides the recitals at the overflowing auditorium. The event was inaugurated by the Deputy head of Indian Mission in Russia at that time. Considering her work in past Ganna has been honored by the Ministry of Culture of Ukraine and her dance ensemble Nakshatra has been awarded as the national ensemble category.

=== Performances ===
She has been invited to perform in the major leading festivals of India and abroad, receiving outstanding reviews from both the audience and critics. She has performed from western India (Ahmadabad) to eastern India (Imphal) and from the northern city of Chandigarh to Southern city of Pondicherry.

Ganna Smirnova has participated in the leading dance festivals of India, such as Mahabalipuram dance festival, Modhera Dance Festival, Taj Mahotsava, Rajgir Dance Festival, Uday Shankar Dance Festival, Natyanjali dance Festival in Chidambaram and Thanjavur, Bharath Kalachar dance festival, Dasyam festival amongst others.

She has been invited to perform by the leading cultural institutions and Sabhas of Tamil Nadu to present her solo dance recital in the cities including Bangalore, Baroda, Mysore, Jaipur, Chandigarh, New Delhi, Kolkata, Panjim, Varanasi, Patna, Hyderabad, Chennai, Thanjavur, Chidambaram Thiruvananthapuram, Bhopal, Guwahati, Bhuvaneswar, and Imphal. She also danced at highly prestigious venues in Berlin, Moscow, London, Lisbon, Milan, Colombo, Kandy and Prague.
