= Ghantoli =

Village in Gujarat, India

- Village
- Location in Gujarat, India
- Coordinates: 22.09137°N 73.66666°E
- Country: India
- State: Gujarat
- District: Chhota Udaipur
- Taluka: Sankheda

Area
  - Total: 3.477 km^{2} (1.342 sq mi)

Population (2011)
  - Total: 408
  - Density: 117/km^{2} (304/sq mi)
- Time zone: UTC+5:30 (IST)
- PIN: 391150

Ghantoli is a small agricultural village in Sankheda taluka of Chhota Udaipur district, Gujarat. It dates back to at least 1045, when it is mentioned in a copper plate inscription recording a land grant made to the local temple to the god Ghaṇṭeśvara (i.e. Shiva). The temple still exists in ruins. There is also a train station in the village. As of 2011, Ghantoli has a population of 408, in 82 households. Most of the locals are employed in agriculture.

== History ==
Ghantoli is identified with the village of Ghaṇṭāpallī mentioned in a copper-plate grant made on 11 November 1045, by Jasorāja, a feudatory of the Paramara king Bhoja who ruled Sankheda. The inscription records Jasorāja's grant of the village of Vilūhaja (possibly modern Velpur), along with 100 units of land at Ghaṇṭāpallī, for a temple to the deity Ghaṇṭeśvara (i.e. Shiva). J. S. Kudalkar reported in 1919 that the temple of Ghaṇṭeśvara still existed at Ghantoli in ruins. He also noted that Ghantoli then had a train station on the Motipur-Tankhala line in Baroda State.

== Demographics ==
As of 2011, Ghantoli had a population of 408, in 82 households. This population was 52.0% male (215) and 48.0% female (193). The 0-6 age group numbered 59 (32 male and 27 female), making up 17.9% of the total population. No members of Scheduled Castes were recorded.

== Economy ==
Ghantoli is almost exclusively an agricultural village; out of a total of 151 workers recorded in the 2011 census, all but one were either cultivators (who owned their own land) or agricultural labourers (who worked someone else's land). There was neither a daily market nor a weekly haat.

== Infrastructure ==
As of 2011, Ghantoli had 1 primary school; it did not have any healthcare facilities. Drinking water was provided by tap, hand pump, and tube well or bore well; there were no public toilets. The village had a sub post office but no public library; there was at least some access to electricity for all purposes. Streets were made of both kachcha and pakka materials.
