= Pranala =

Drainage spout

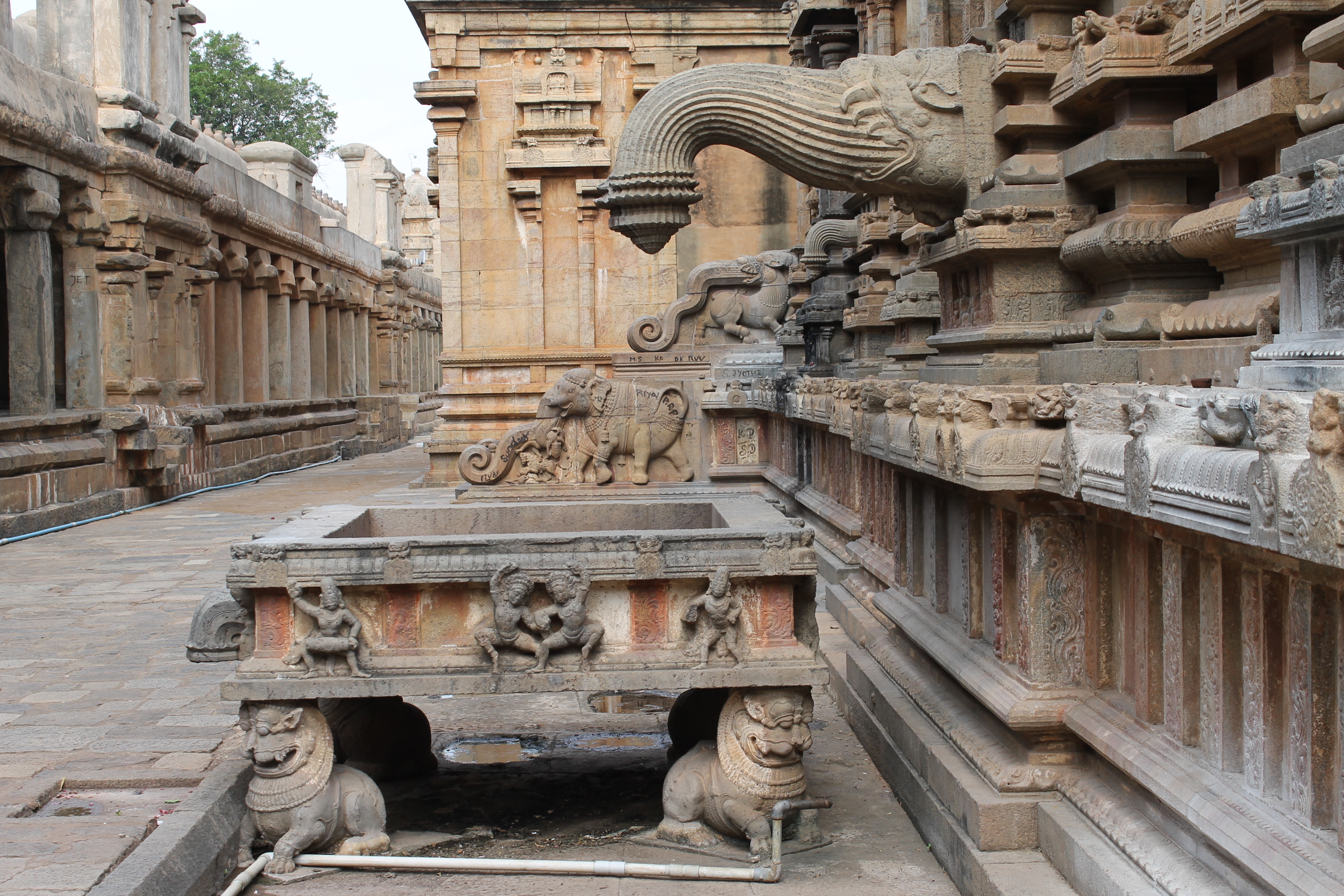
A pranala at the Brihadisvara Temple in Thanjavur

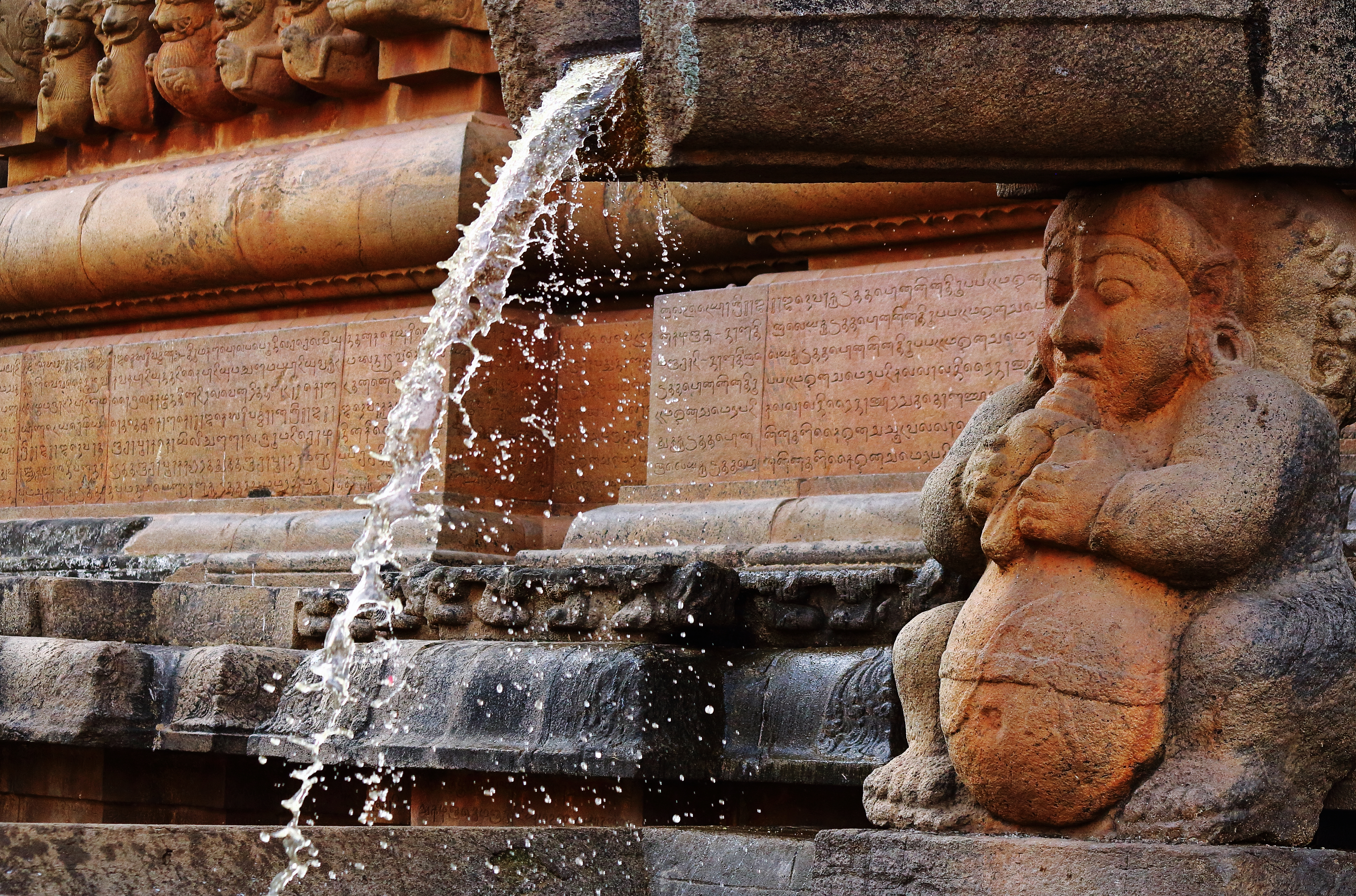
Another pranala at the Brihadisvara Temple, Thanjavur

In Hindu temple architecture, a pranala (IAST: praṇāla) is a discharge outlet attached to the wall of the sanctum. It discharges the lustral water or other liquids poured over the idols.

== History ==
The earliest evidence of the pranalas can be dated to the Shaka-Kushana period in northern India. The pranalas continued to be used in the subsequent years, including the Gupta period. However, the elaborately sculptured pranalas first appear only in the 8th century CE. The pranalas were common in several parts of India; they were less common in the Hindu architecture of Southeast Asia, except in Java.

The pranala is also known as praṇāli, nāla, nāli, gomukha, or nirgama. Some 20th-century French archaeologists have used the term "soma-sūtra" to describe the pranala, but Indian texts clearly distinguish between these two terms: a soma-sūtra is a line along which the pranala is placed.

== Designs ==
Pranalas are used to drain out the abhisheka-teertham water, milk, ghee, etc. poured over the temple idols.

The most common type of pranala in historical temples is the makara-pranala, which is similar to the European gargoyle. It depicts the mythical sea-creature makara (also called graha). The popularity of the makara-pranala probably results from the creature's association with water. The 11th-century text Samarangana Sutradhara recommends making a pranali (that is, pranala) drain all around the sanctum, with an outlet in the shape of a graha (or makara). Vishvakarma's Vastushastra, a late 11th-century compendium on the Māru-Gurjara architecture, also mentions the pranala. Aparajita-prchchha, dated late 12th to early 13th century, refers to the makara-pranala used to clear the water out of the temple's jagati (platform).

The next most common type of pranala is the grasa-pranala, which depicts the grasa (also known as kirtimukha) mythical creature. The gorgon of the early Greek temples inspired the Indian grasa-pranala, which in turn, inspired the similar motifs in South-East Asia, particularly Java. The grasa-pranala is common in the historical temples of south India; a few examples have also been discovered in Madhya Pradesh, in central India.

The simha-pranala, which depicts a lion, is similar to the grasa-pranala. It is probably inspired by the lion-head spouts that were common in Classical Greek, Hellenistic, and Roman temples. A variation of this form is the simha-nala, which features a tube coming out of a lion's mouth: the tip of the tube may depict another lion's mouth (this type is called simha-mukha-nala), or another object, such as a lotus bud.

Other forms include:

- Bhuta-pranala: depicts a bhuta or jambhaka, a goblin-like creature.
- Ghata-pranala: depicts a ghata or spherical plot, often held by a human figure.
- Marala-pali: depicts the peripheral wall of a house (marala) and a pot (pali) stationed for collecting the drainage water.
- Snapana-griha or Chandesha-griha: A special shrine for a Chandesha (IAST: Caṇḍeśa, a deity); the water from the temple's sanctum is received into this shrine.
- Undecorated nala: These are inornate water spouts; common in temples of Tamil Nadu (especially those from the Chola period).

Pranalas with unique designs also exist: for example, the Koteshwara Temple in Srikakulam has a pranala in which the water spouts out of the bust of a Nandi figure.

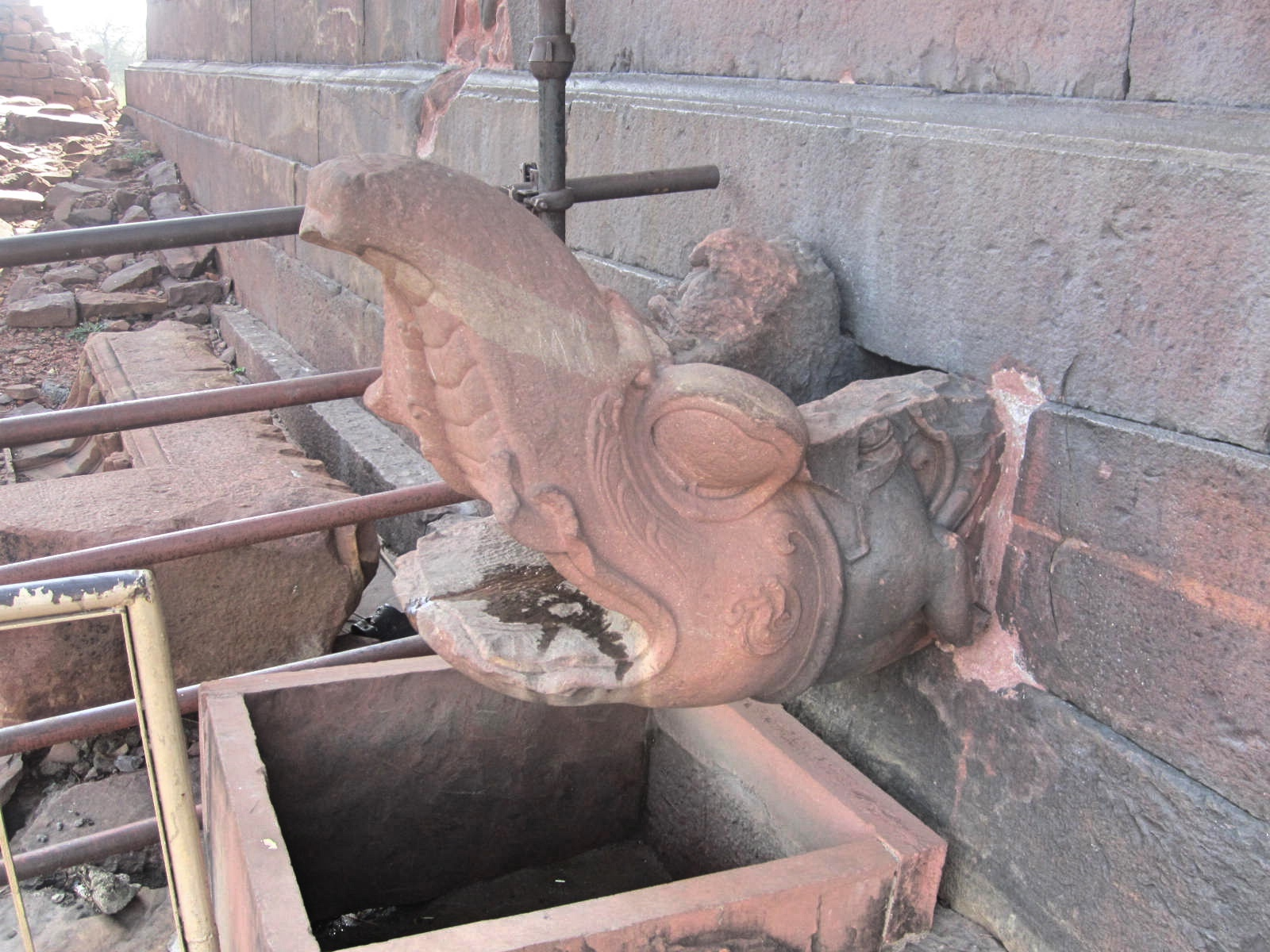
Malava-style makara-pranala at the Bhojeshwar Temple

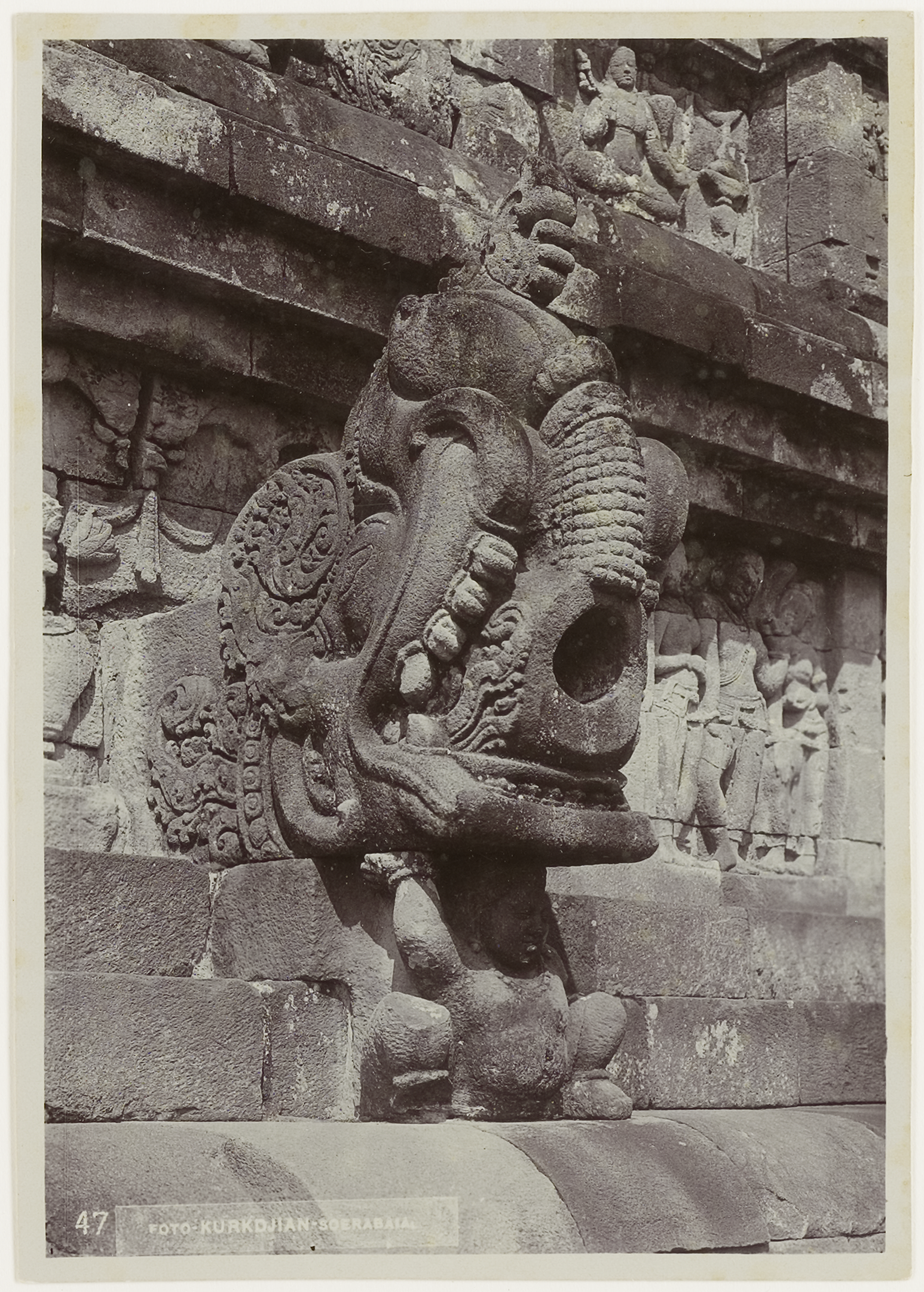
Makara-pranala at Borobudur, Indonesia

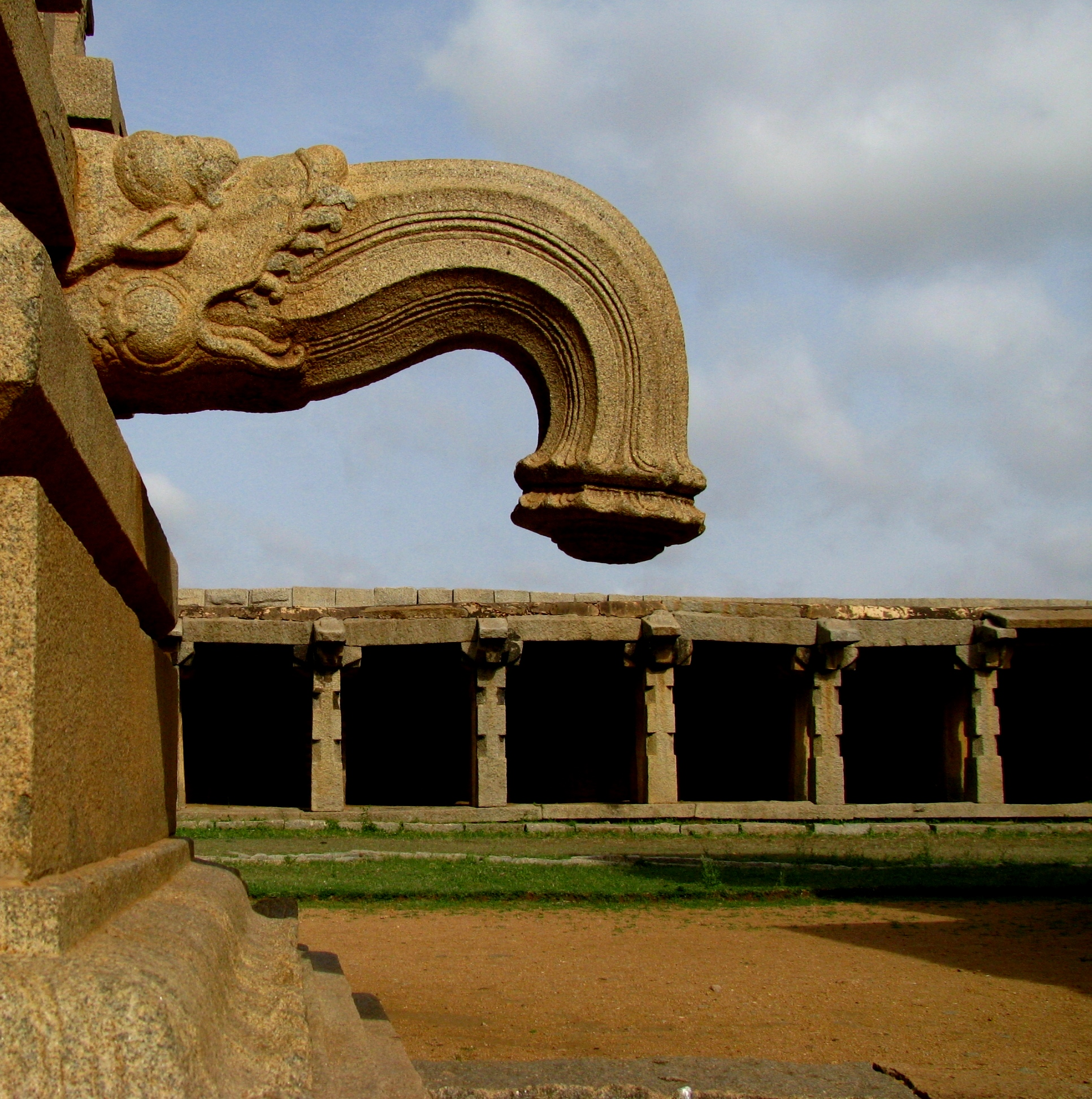
A makara-pranala at the Hazara Rama temple

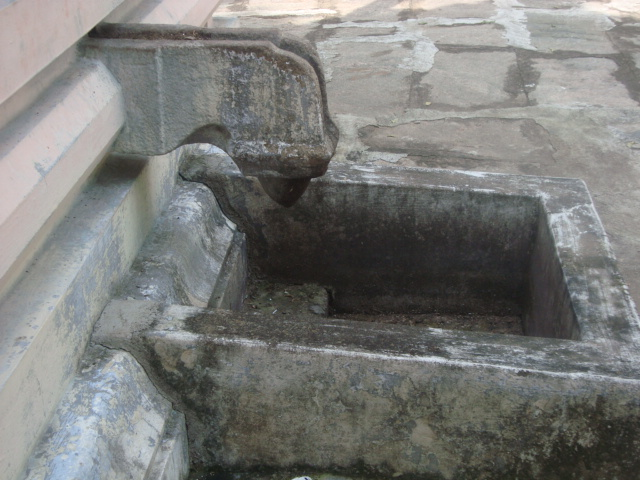
A simple pranala at a temple in Tamil Nadu

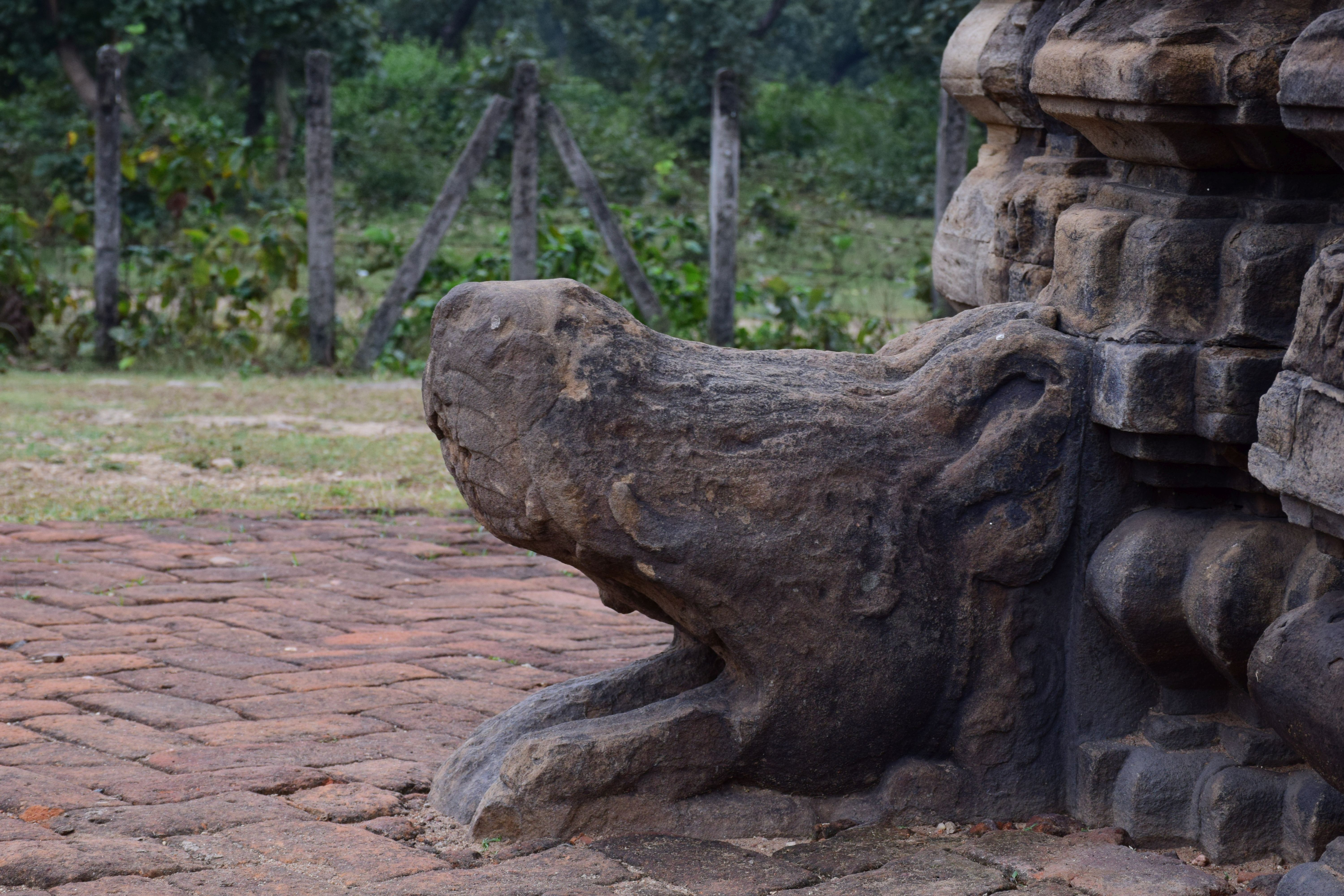
A pranala at Banda Deul temple in West Bengal

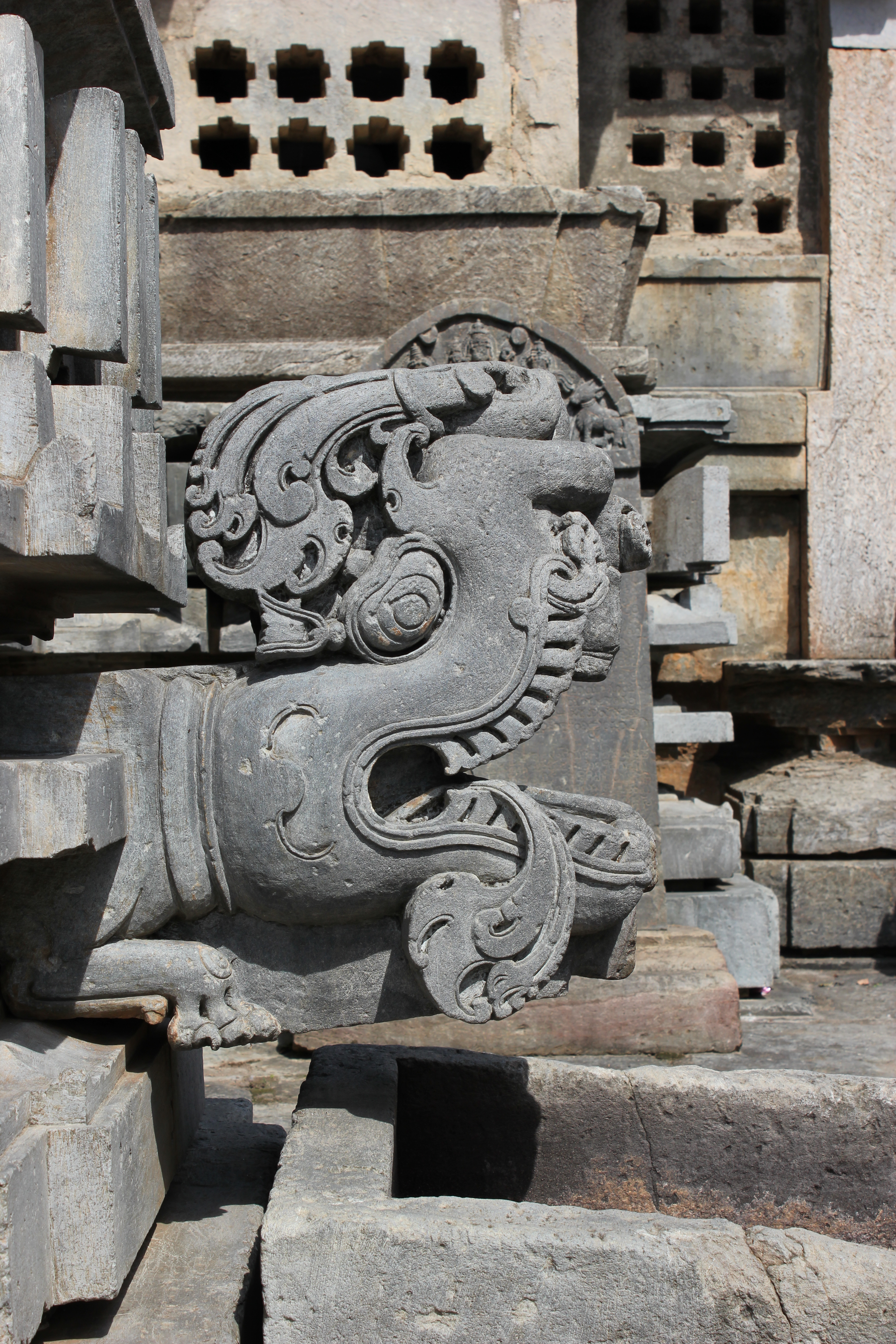
Makara-pranala at Lakshmi Devi Temple

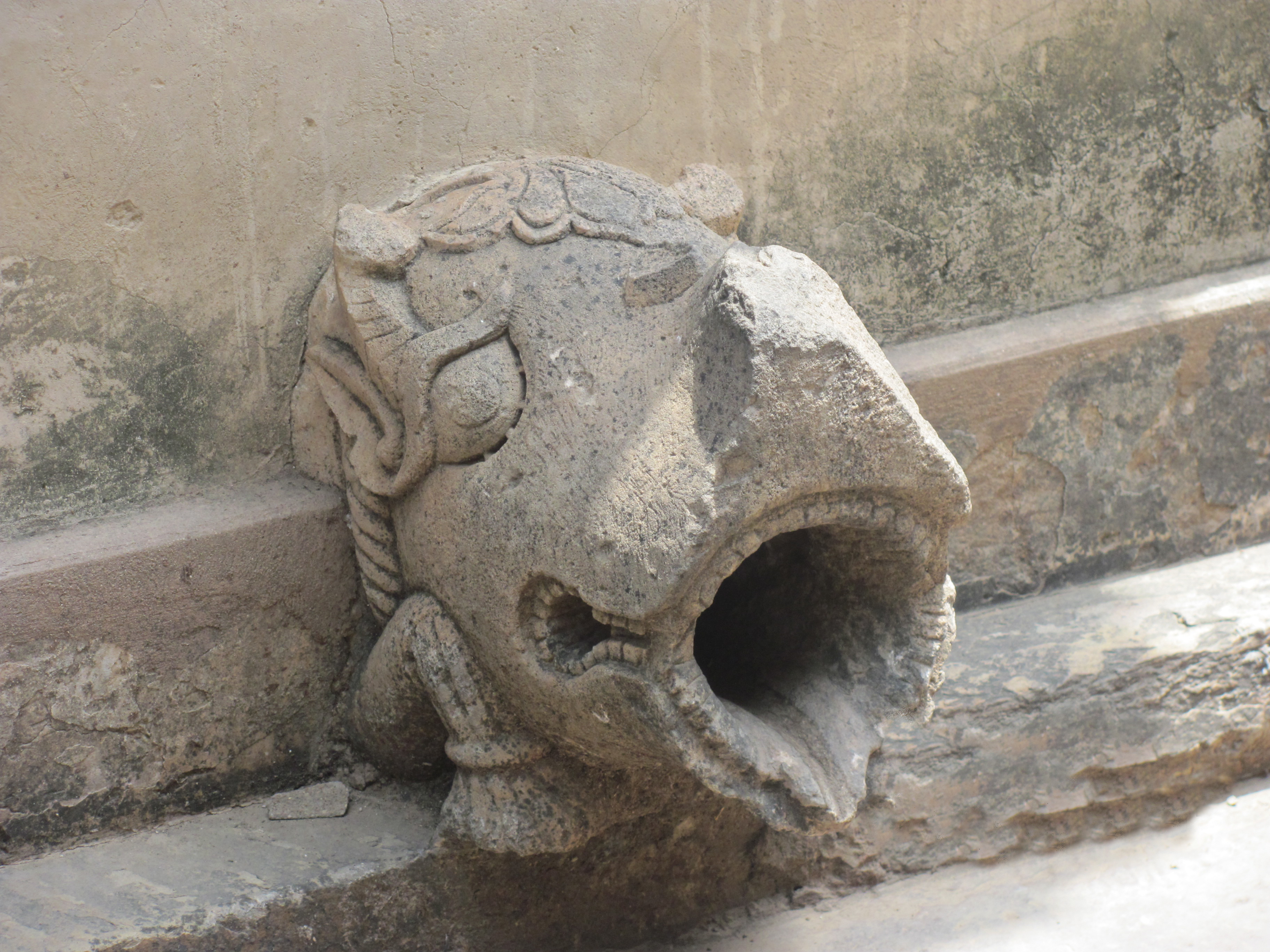
Pranala at Someshwar temple in Bhangarh Fort

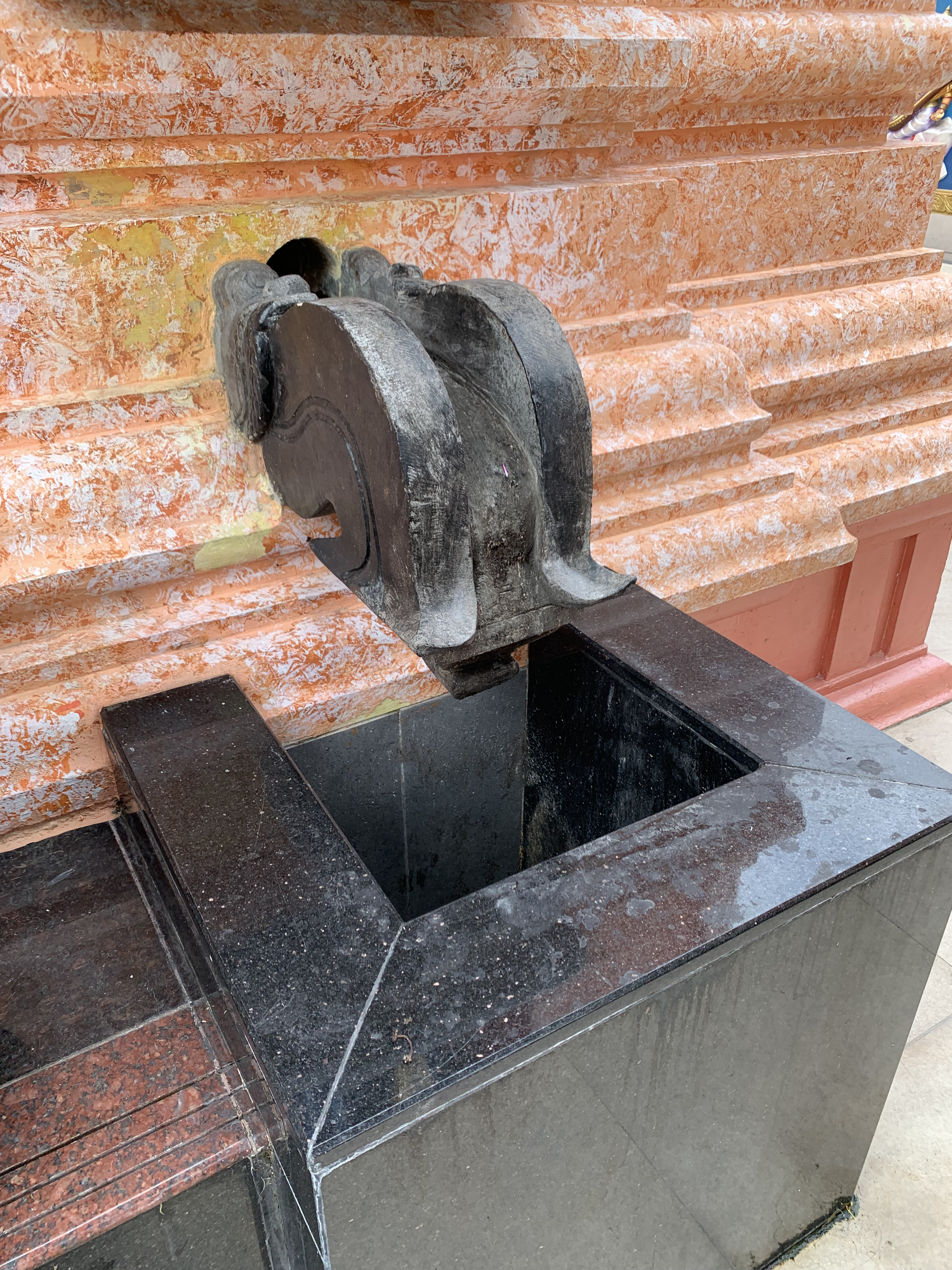
Pranala at a Hindu temple in Johor Bahru, Malaysia

== Examples ==
Some notable examples of the pranala are:

Type	Location	Date	Style	Source
makara-matsya (fish)	IN-UP: Kankali Tila (now at Mathura Museum)	c. 1st century BCE-2nd century CE	probably Satraps of Mathura	
makara-matsya	IN-UP: Mathura Museum	c. 1st century-2nd century	probably Kushana	
makara	IN-UP: Rajghat, Varanasi	c. 1st century-2nd century	Satraps-Kushana or Tribal	
simha-mukha (two pieces)	LK-7: Anuradhapura: Thuparamaya	c. 2nd-3rd century	?	
grasa	IN-MH: Brick temple, Gondia	c. 5th century	Vakataka	
grasa	IN-MP: Tigawa	c. 5th century	Gupta	
grasa	IN-MP: Bhumara Temple	c. 5th century	Gupta	
grasa	IN-MP: Mahdia temple	c. 5th century	Gupta	
makara	IN-RJ: Gupta temple, Nagari	c. mid-5th century	Gupta	
makara	IN-MP: Gupta temple, Deogarh	c. late 5th century	Gupta	
makara pranalas (two pieces)	IN-UP: Sarnath Museum	c. 5th-6th century	Late Gupta	
grasa / matanga-makara	IN-MP: Shiva temple, Tala	c. 6th century	Post-Vakataka	
bhuta	IN-TN: Dharmaraja Ratha, Mahabalipuram	c. 640	Tondainadu (Pallava)	
kapi (monkey)	IN-TN: Dharma-raja ratha, Mahabalipuram	c. 640	Tondainadu (Pallava)	
kalamakara (vyala-makara hybrid)	VN-27: Trà Kiệu, Vietnam	c. mid-7th century	Champa	
makara	IN-KA: Lakulisha temple, Siddanakolla	c. 700	Early Karnata (Chalukya)	
makara	IN-TG: Sangameshvara temple, Kudaveli	c. early 8th century	Karnata-Nagara: Andhra school (early Chalukya)	
grasa	IN-KA:Galaganatha Temple, Pattadakal	c. early 8th century	Karnata-Nagara: Alampur school (early Chalukya)	
grasa	IN-KA:Virupaksha (Lokeshvara) Temple, Pattadakal	c. 725-733	Early Chalukya	
grasa	IN-KA:Sangameshwara Temple, Pattadakal	c. 740	Early Chalukya	
matanga-nakra	IN-MP: Teli ka Mandir	c. mid-8th century	Early Gopadri	
damaged	IN-MH: Kailasha temple, Ellora	c. 756-776	Early Karnata (Rashtrakuta)	
makara	LK-7: Anuradhapura Museum	c. 8th century or earlier		
makara	LK-7: Anuradhapura (Isurumuniya)	c. 8th century		
makara (graha)	ID-JT: Borobudur, Indonesia	c. 8th century	Javanese	
ghata held by Nagaraja	IN-AP: Madhukeshwara Temple, Mukhalingam	c. 8th century (last quarter)	Early Kalinga (Bhauma-Kara)	
ghata held by two vidyadharis	IN-RJ: Harshat mata temple, Abhaneri (now at Amber Museum)	c. late 8th century	Sapadalaksha (probably early Chahamana)	
grasa	ID-JT: Borobudur, Indonesia	c. 800	Javanese	
bhuta	IN-TN: Kaveripakkam	c. 800	Late Tondainadu (Late Pallava)	
makara	KH-13: Prasat Krahom, Cambodia	c. 825-875	Cambodian	
makara	IN-RJ: Vishnu temple, Kusuma	c. mid-9th century	Maha-Gurjara	
simha	IN-AP: Nakkala gudi temple at Biccavolu	c. 9th century	Andhra Style (Eastern Chalukya)	
bhuta	IN-TN: Jalanatheeswarar Temple, Thakkolam	c. 875	Late Tondainadu (Late Pallava)	
simha-nala	IN-TN: Apatsahayesvarar Temple	c. 884	Cholanadu (early Chola)	
makara	VN-27: Mỹ Sơn, Vietnam	c. 9th or 10th century	Champa	
grasa	IN-KA: Akka-Tangai temple, Manne	c. early 10th century	Early Karnata (Rashtrakuta)	
grasa	IN-KA: Kalleshvara Temple, Bagali	c. early 10th century	Late Karnata (Chalukya)	
snapana-griha	IN-GJ: Trinetreshvara temple, Tarnetar	c. 10th century (2nd quarter)	Maha-Gurjara (Chapa)	
makara	IN-KA: Lakshmaneshvara temple, Avani	c. 934	Nolambavadi (Nolamba)	
simsumara (a sea-creature)	IN-AP: Bhimeshvara temple at Bhimavaram	c. 10th century	Andhra Style (Eastern Chalukya)	
ghata held by a vidyadhara	IN-MP: Lakshmana Temple, Khajuraho	c. 954	Jejakabukti (Chandella)	
bhuta	IN-MP: Lakshmana Temple, Khajuraho	c. 954	Jejakabukti (Chandella)	
makara	KH-17: Pre Rup, Cambodia	c. 947-965	Cambodian	
snapana-griha	IN-RJ: Ambika Mata Temple, Jagat, Rajasthan	c. 961	Maha-Gurjara (Guhila)	
simha-nala	IN-TN: Tirunarayur Siddhanatheswarar Temple	986	Cholanadu (Middle Chola)	
makara	IN-KA: Nandappa temple, Sirwal	c. 10th century (last quarter)	Later Karnata (Chalukya)	
nala	IN-TN: Enadi Siva Temple	c. late 10th century	Pandinadu (Chola-Pandya)	
nala	IN-TN: Kandalishvara temple, Tenneri	c. 995 or earlier	Cholanadu (Later Chola)	
kari-makara, a hybrid of an elephant and a makara	IN-BR: Indian Museum, Kolkata, found in Bihar	c. 10th-11th century	Early Magadha (late Pala)	
ghata held by a vidyadhari	IN-MP: Gurgi (Gurh); now at Ahmedabad Municipal Museum	c. 10th-11th century	Dahala (Chedi)	
marala-pali / ghata held by a human figure, possibly Chandesha	IN-RJ: Nagada	c. 1000	Maha-Gurjara	
nala, with a lion figure at the bottom	IN-TN: Ganapati shrine, Sakalabuvaneswarar Temple complex, Tirumeeyachur	c. early 11th century	Cholanadu (Middle Chola)	
simha-mukha with floral ending	IN-TN: Ganapati shrine, Muyarchinatheswarar Temple complex	c. early 11th century	Cholanadu (Middle Chola)	
simha-mukha	IN-TN: Kailasanathar temple, Brahmadesam	c. early 11th century	Pandinadu (Chola-Pandya)	
ghata held by a human figure	IN-GJ: Shiva temple, Kevan (near Shravana, Sabarkantha)	c. early 11th century	Maru-Gurjara (Chaulukya)	
vyala	IN-KL: Vadakkunnathan Temple, Thrissur (main temple and Rama shrine)	c. early 11th century	Middle Kerala	
makara	IN-KA: Jain Temple, Lakkundi	1008	Later Karnata (Chalukya)	
bhuta	IN-TN: Brihadisvara Temple, Thanjavur	1010	Chola	
nala with makara	IN-KA: Galageshvara temple, Galaganatha	c. 1025	Later Karnata (Chalukya)	
makara	IN-GJ: Mahavira marble temple, Kumbharia	c. 1062	Maru-Gurjara style	
?	IN-MP: Udayeshvara temple, Udaipur, Madhya Pradesh	c. 1080	Malava (Paramara)	
simha-nala	IN-TN: Varadaraja Perumal Temple complex - Amman shrine	c. 11th century	Cholanadu (Middle Chola)	
simha-nala	IN-TN: Varadaraja Perumal Temple complex - Shrine No. 1	c. 11th century	Cholanadu (Middle Chola)	
vyala	IN-KL: Rama temple, Triprayar	c. 11th century CE	Middle Kerala	
makara	IN-RJ: Chandravati temple	c. 11th century	Maru-Gurjara style	
makara	IN-MP: Bhojeshwar Temple, Bhojpur	11th century		
makara	IN-MP: Bijamandala mosque, Vidisha	c. 11th century	Malava (Paramara) style	
makara	IN-MP: Adinatha temple, Khajuraho	c. 11th century (3rd quarter)	Jejakabukti (Chandella)	
ghata held by a vidyadhara or Chandesha	IN-MP: Indore Museum	c. late 11th century	Malava (Paramara-Guhila)	
kari-makara	IN-BR: Munger, now at Patna Museum	c. 11th-12th century	Late Magadha style, possibly from the Sena period	
simha-nala, with bhuta supporting the pranala from below	IN-TN: Amirthakadeswarar Temple, Melakadambur	c. 1110-1113	Cholanadu (Chola, Late phase)	
makara	IN-KA: Lakshmi Devi Temple, Doddagaddavalli	1112	Later Karnata (Hoysala)	
makara	IN-KA: Chennakeshvara Temple, Marale	1130	Later Karnata (Hoysala)	
simha-mukha	IN-TN: Airavatesvara Temple	1146-1172	Cholanadu (Late Chola)	
simha	IN-TN: Airavatesvara Temple complex - Daivanayaki-Amman shrine	1146-1172	Cholanadu (Late Chola)	
nala	LK-7: Shiva Devale No. 1, Polonnaruwa	c. 12th century	Later Cholanadu (Later Chola)	
makara, with a bhuta below, and a goddess above	IN-AP: Bhavannarayana temple, Sarpavaram	c. 12th century	Later Andhra (Eastern Chalukya)	
simsumara (a sea-creature)	IN-AP: Mandavya-Narayana temple at Samalkota	c. 12th century	Late Vengi (Eastern Chalukya)	
makara	IN-GJ: Jina Ajitanatha, Taranga	c. 1165	Maru-Gurjara style	
matanga-makara (elephant-makara)	IN-AP: Varaha Lakshmi Narasimha temple, Simhachalam	c. 1238-1268	Andhra-Kalinga style (Ganga)	
makara	IN-MH: Gondeshwar Temple, Sinnar	c. 13th century	Seuna-desha style	
makara	IN-MP: Bhoramdeo Temple, Madhya Pradesh	c. 13th century	Dahala-Andhra (Chedi-Kakatiya) style	
nakra (crocodile)	IN-OR: Chayadevi temple within the Konark Sun Temple complex	c. 13th century	Later Kalinga (Ganga)	
matanga-makara or saunda-makara (elephant-makara hybrid)	IN-OR: Chayadevi temple within the Konark Sun Temple complex	c. 13th century	Later Kalinga (Ganga)	
nandi	IN-AP: Koteshwara Temple, Srikakulam	c. 15th century	Vijayanagara	
nala	IN-TN: Vaishnava temple, Srimushnam	c. 15th century	Nayaka	
nala with vyala leaping from lion's mouth	IN-TN: Amman shrine, Ambika temple complex, Kalakadu	c. late 15th century	Nayaka	
simha-nala	IN-TN: Avudaiyarkoil temple	c. late 15th or early 16th century	Madurai Nayaka	
simha-nala	IN-TN: Sattainathar Temple, Sirkazhi	c. 15th-16th century	Thanjavur Nayaka	
nala with vyala leaping from lion's mouth	IN-TN: Bhaktavatsala temple, Cheranmahadevi	c. early 16th century	Nayaka	
nala with floral petals	IN-KA:Rameshvara temple, Keladi	c. early 16th century	Keladi-Nayaka	
nala with floral petals	IN-KA:Virabhadra temple, Keladi	c. early 16th century	Keladi-Nayaka	
nala with lion head at orifice, and lotus bud at the tip	IN-KA: Vitthala temple, Hampi	c. 16th century (first half)	Vijayanagara	
simha-nala	IN-KA: Aghoreshvara temple, Ikkeri	c. 1515-1545	Ikkeri-Nayaka	
nala	IN-KA: Amman shrine, Vitthala temple complex, Hampi	c. 16th century	Vijayanagara	
simha-nala	IN-TN: Chandramouleeswar temple, Thiruvakkarai	c. 16th century	Thanjavur Nayaka	
simha-nala	IN-TN: Vedagiriswarar temple	c. late 16th century	Thanjavur Nayaka	
simha-nala	IN-TN: Kumbeswarar Temple, Kumbakonam	c. 16th-17th century	Thanjavur Nayaka	
simha-nala	IN-TN: Swaminathaswamy temple, Swamimalai	c. 16th-17th century	Thanjavur Nayaka	
nala	IN-TN: Raghaveshvara temple, Darasaguppe	c. 16th-17th century	Nayaka	
nala	IN-TN: Subrahmanya shrine, Brihadishvara temple complex, Thanjavur	c. 17th century	Nayaka	
