= Kalikadevi Temple =

- Location in Odisha

Religion
- Affiliation: Hinduism
- District: Khurda
- Deity: Goddess Kali

Location
- Location: Bhubaneswar
- State: Odisha
- Country: India
- Coordinates: 20°20′59″N 85°50′7″E

Architecture
- Type: Kalingan Style (Kalinga Architecture)
- Completed: 14th century A.D.
- Elevation: 29 m (95 ft)

Kalikadevi Temple (Location: Lat. 20° 20’ 59" N., Long. 85° 49’ 67" E., Elev. 95 ft) is located in the Kancha Sahi, Old Town, Bhubaneswar of Odisha, India. It is on the right side of the Temple road leading from Lingaraja Temple to Garej chowk. The enshrined deity is a four armed female divinity locally known as Kali.

== Ownership ==
i) Single/ Multiple: Single.

ii) Public/ Private: Private.

iii) Any other (specify): The temple is situated in the private plot of Prakash Panda.

iv) Name: Prakash Panda

v) Address: Godipokhari Sahi, Gosagaresvara Chowk, Old Town, Bhubaneswar.

== Age ==
i)Precise date: .....

ii) Approximate date: 10th / 11th Century A.D.

iii) Source of Information: Bada division and pabhaga mouldings.

== Property Type ==
i) Precinct/ Building/ Structure/Landscape/Site/Tank: Building

ii) Subtype: Temple

iii) Typology: Pidha deul

== Property use ==
i) Abandoned/ in use: In use

ii) Present use: Living temple

iii) Past use: Worshipped

== Significance ==
i) Historic significance: As per the local tradition the temple was constructed during the time of Kesharis (Somavamsis), which is improbable taking into account the architectural features of the temple.

ii) Cultural significance: Kali puja, Chandipuja.

iii) Social significance: Annaprasana, Balabhoga.

== Physical description ==
i) Surrounding: The temple is surrounded by residential buildings on all sides except the Temple road in the north.

ii) Orientation: The temple is facing towards north.

iii) Architectural features (Plan and Elevation): On plan, the temple has a square vimana measuring 2.75 square metres with a frontal porch of 0.52 metres. On elevation, the vimana is of pidha order having bada, gandi and mastaka measuring 5.50 metres in height. Bada is panchanga with fivefold division measuring 2.30 metres in height (pabhaga 0.58 metres, tala jangha 0.58 metres, bandhana 0.14 metres, upara jangha 0.58 metres, and baranda 0.42 metres). The gandi measures 2.00 metres and mastaka measure 1.20 metres.

iv) Raha niche & parsva devatas: The raha niches are located in the tala jangha measuring 0.43 metres in height x 0.29 metres in width and with a depth of 0.12 metres. All are empty.

v) Decorative features: —

Doorjambs: The doorjambs are plain and measure 1.36 metres in height x 0.90 metres in width. There are two niches in either side of the doorjamb measuring 1.02 metres in height x 0.60 metres in width x 0.63 metres in depth and house two images of dvarapalikas of recent installation.

vi) Building material: Sandstone

vii) Construction techniques: Dry masonry

viii) Style: Kalingan

== State of preservation ==
i) Good/Fair/ Showing Signs of Deterioration/Advanced: Fair

ii) State of Decay/Danger of Disappearance: —

== Condition description ==
i) Signs of distress: —

ii) Structural problems: —

iii) Repairs and Maintenance: The temple is repaired and maintained by Prakash Panda.

== Grade (A/B/C) ==
i) Architecture: B

ii) Historic: C

iii) Associational: B

iv) Social/Cultural: B

== Threats to the property ==
Conservation Problem and Remedies: There is a pranala in the eastern side.

== Date of Documentation ==
19.11.2006

== Documenter ==
Dr. Sadasiba Pradhan and team.
