= Tirumeeyachur Ilamkovil Sakalabhuvaneswarar Temple =

Religion
- Affiliation: Hinduism
- District: Tiruvarur
- Deity: Lord Shiva

Location
- Location: Thirumeeyachur in Tiruvarur district
- State: Tamil Nadu
- Country: India
- Interactive map of Tirumeeyachur Ilamkovil Sakalabhuvaneswarar Temple

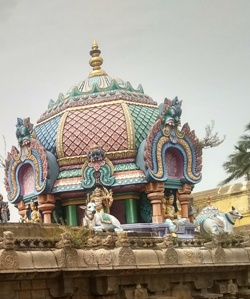
Vimana of the presiding deity

Tirumeeyachur Ilamkovil Sakalabhuvaneswarar Temple (திருமீயச்சூர் இளங்கோயில் சகலபுவனேஸ்வரர் கோயில்) is a Hindu temple located at Thirumeeyachur in Tiruvarur district, Tamil Nadu, India. The presiding deity is Shiva. He is called as Sakalabhuvaneswarar. His consort is known as Mekalambika.

== Significance ==
It is one of the shrines of the 275 Paadal Petra Sthalams - Shiva Sthalams glorified in the early medieval Tevaram poems by Tamil Saivite Nayanar Tirunavukkarasar. This temple is in the premises of Tirumeeyachur Mehanadhar Temple.

== Literary mention ==
Tirunavukkarasar describes the feature of the deity as:

ஆறு கொண்ட சடையினர் தாமுமோர்

வேறு கொண்டதொர் வேடத்த ராகிலும்
கூறு கொண்டுகந் தாளொடு மீயச்சூர்

ஏறு கொண்டுகந் தாரிளங் கோயிலே.
