= Tirumeeyachur Mehanadhar Temple =

Shiva temple in Tamil Nadu, India

Mehanadhar Temple
- Lalithambika temple
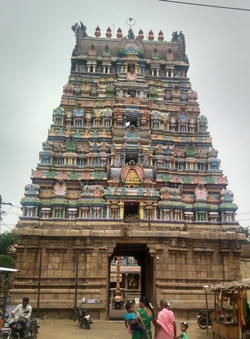

- Location in Tamil Nadu

Religion
- Affiliation: Hinduism
- District: Thiruvarur
- Deity: Mehanathar (Shiva); Lalithambika (Parvathi)

Location
- Location: Tirumeichur
- State: Tamil Nadu
- Country: India
- Coordinates: 10°57′46″N 79°38′50″E

Architecture
- Type: Dravidian architecture

Tirumeeyachur Meganathar Temple (திருமீயச்சூர் மேகநாதர் கோயில்) is a Hindu temple located at Thirumeeyachur in Tiruvarur district, Tamil Nadu, India. The presiding deity is Shiva, called Meganathaswami. His consort is known as Lalithambika.

== Significance ==
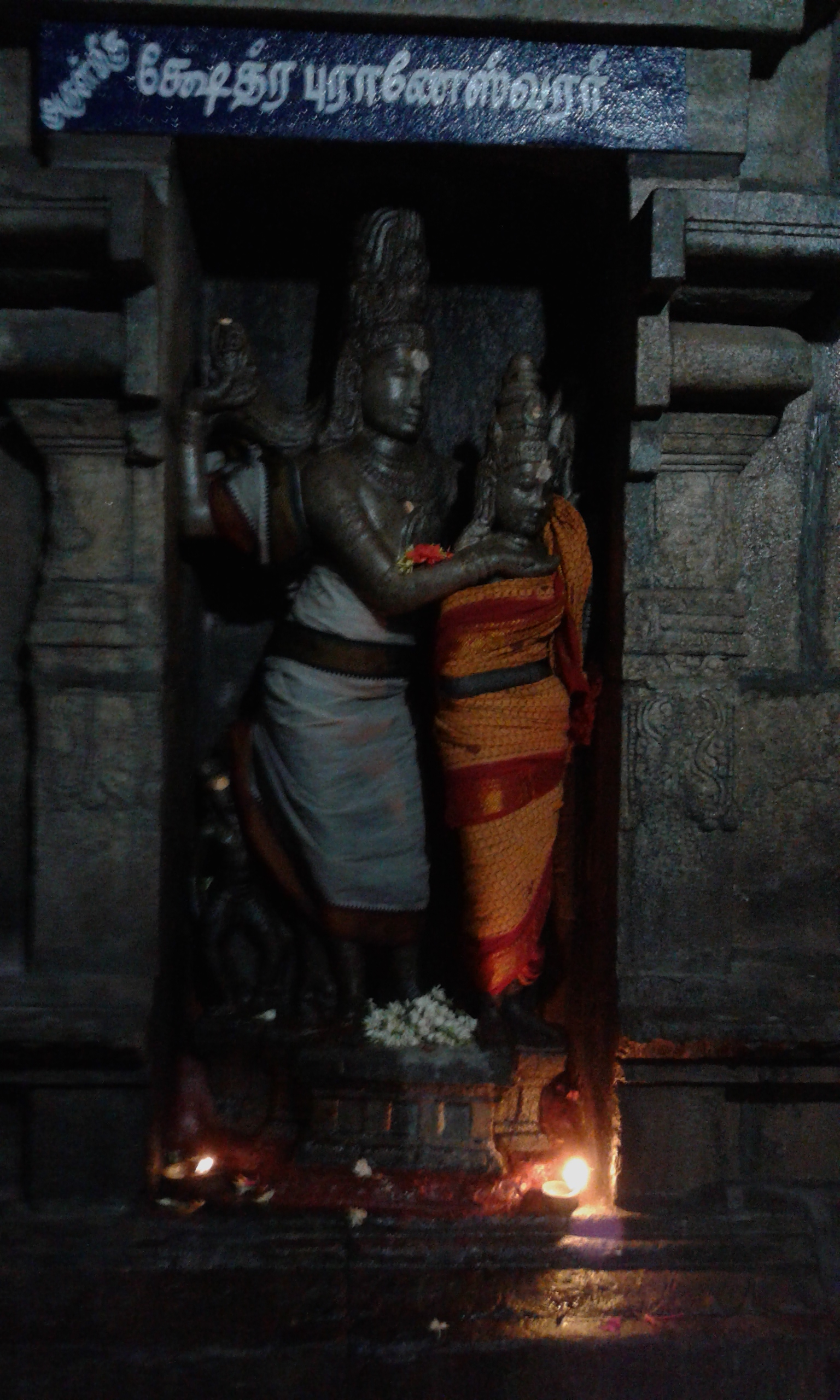
Image of Kshetra Puraneswarar

It is one of the shrines of the 275 Paadal Petra Sthalams - Shiva Sthalams glorified in the early medieval Tevaram poems by Tamil Saivite Nayanar Tirugnanasambandar.

Tirumeeyachur Ilamkovil Sakalabhuvaneswarar Temple is also located on this temple's premises.

Tirumeeyachur Meganathar Temple is where the Lalita Sahasranama was composed and was taught to Agastya by Hayagriva .

This temple is considered to be the birth place of Garuda - the vahana of Vishnu, and Aruna - the charioteer of Surya. As per the legend and Sthalapurana, Vinata and Katru (wives of Kashyapa) worshipped Shiva here and were blessed with Garuda and Aruna as their sons. Aruna worshipped Shiva here and became a charioteer of Surya.

== Gallery ==
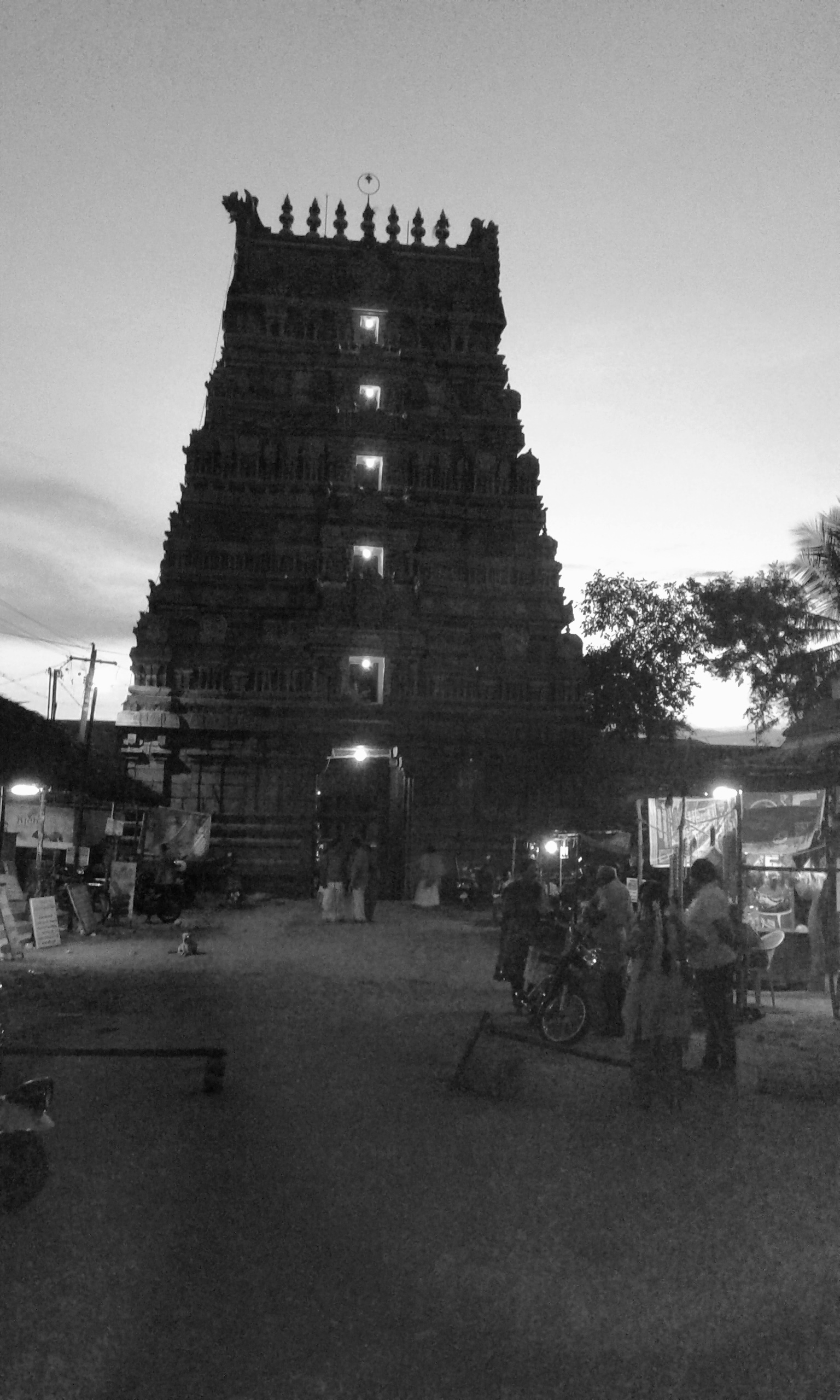
Rajagopuram

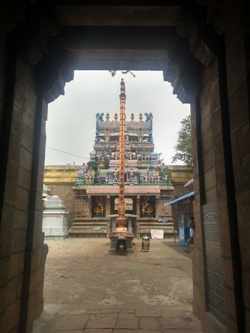
Flagpost

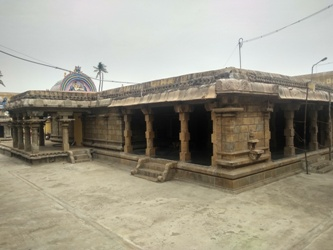
Front mandapa

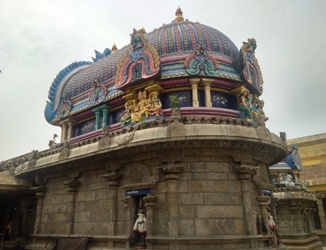
Vimana of the presiding deity

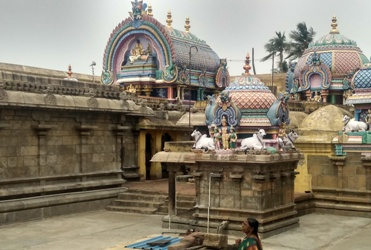
Mehanadhar vimana and Sakalabhuvanesvarar vimana

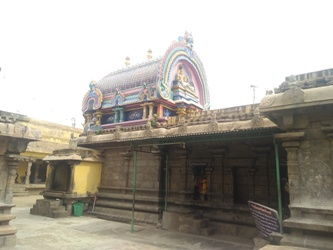
Vimana from north side
