= Enadi Siva Temple =

Enadi Siva Temple is a Hindu temple located at Enadi in the Thirumayam taluk of Pudukkottai district in Tamil Nadu, India. Dedicated to Shiva, the temple dates from the early 10th century AD. The architecture resembles the late Pallava and the roof resembles that of Draupadi Ratha in Mahabalipuram.
