= Lakshmi Devi Temple, Doddagaddavalli =

Lakshmi Devi temple at Dodda Gaddavalli
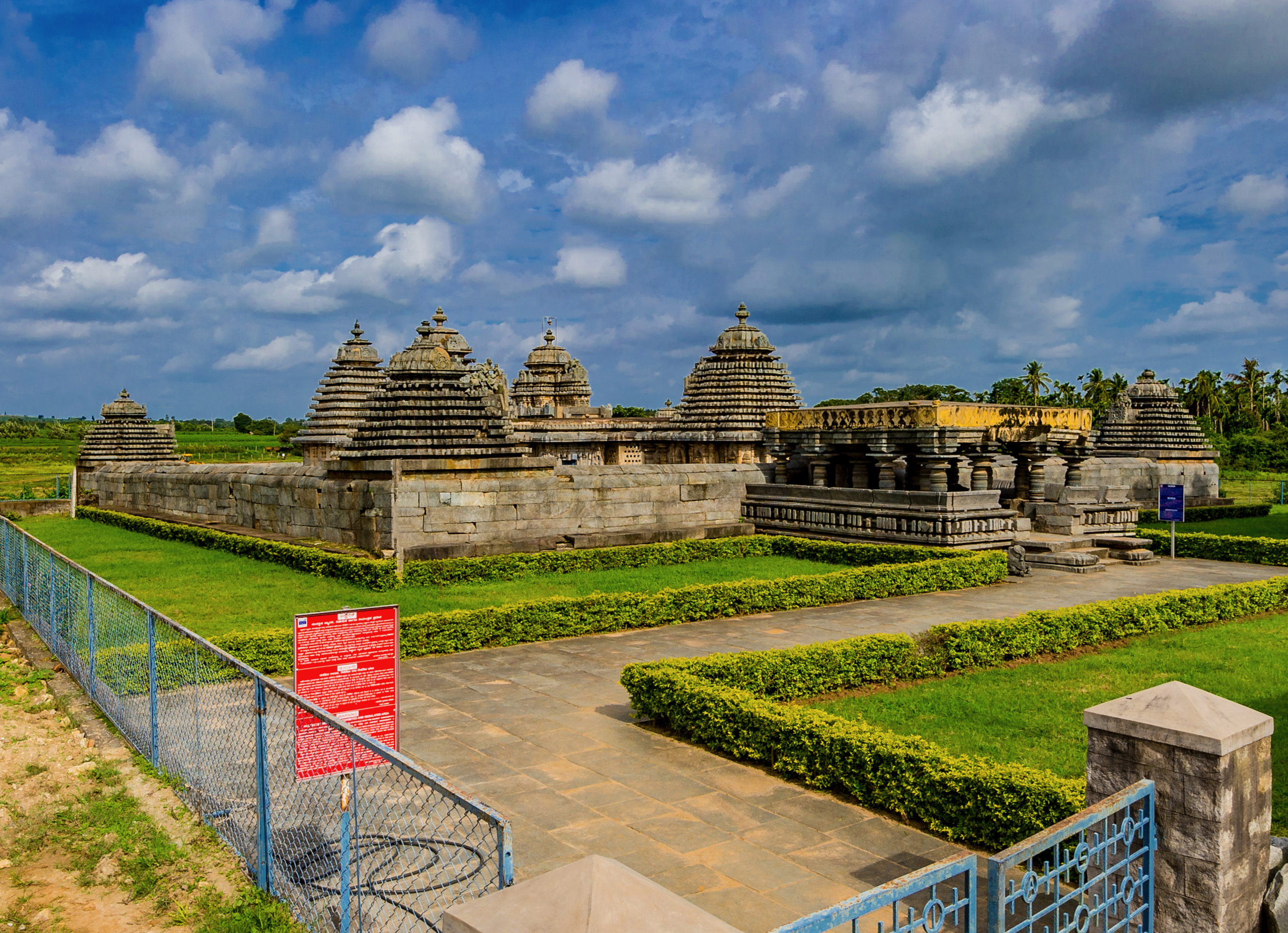

- Location within India Location within Karnataka

Religion
- Affiliation: Hinduism
- District: Hassan
- Deity: Mahalakshmi

Location
- Location: Doddagaddavalli
- State: Karnataka
- Country: India
- Interactive map of Lakshmi Devi temple at Dodda Gaddavalli
- Coordinates: 13°05′45.6″N 76°00′14″E

Architecture
- Type: Hoysala
- Creator: Kullahana Rahuta and wife Sahaj Devi (merchants)
- Completed: c. 1113 CE

The Lakshmi Devi temple is an early 12th-century Hindu temple dedicated for Goddess Mahalakshmi, who is considered to be a jagrat (awake) devi in Doddagaddavalli village in Hassan District, Karnataka, India. It is the first Hoysala Temple constructed by the erstwhile rulers of the dynasty. The main temple has four-shrines that share a common mandapa (hall), each sanctum being a square and aligned to a cardinal direction. The eastern shrine houses the Hindu goddess Mahalakshmi, the northern shrine is dedicated to Kali, the western to Shiva—who is worshipped as Lakshmi’s brother—and the southern shrine, once dedicated to Vishnu, now stands empty due to widespread vandalism and destruction. The complex has a separate Bhairava shrine northeast of the main temple, and four small shrines at the corners inside a nearly square prakara (compound). All nine temples are in the pyramidal north Indian style Nagara shikhara, likely an influence from Maharashtra. The complex has additional smaller shrines.

== Location and date ==
Doddagaddavalli is called Gadumballi in historic inscriptions. It is located about 20 kilometres (12 mi) northwest from Hassan city, about 16 kilometres (10 mi) south of Halebidu, and about 25 kilometres (16 mi) southeast from Belur (NH 373). The temple is to the south side of the modern village, on the banks of a historic water reservoir. The Lakshmi Devi temple was built in 1113 CE by a wealthy merchant Kalhana Ravuta and his wife Sahaja Devi during the reign of the famous Hoysala King Vishnuvardhana.

== Architecture ==
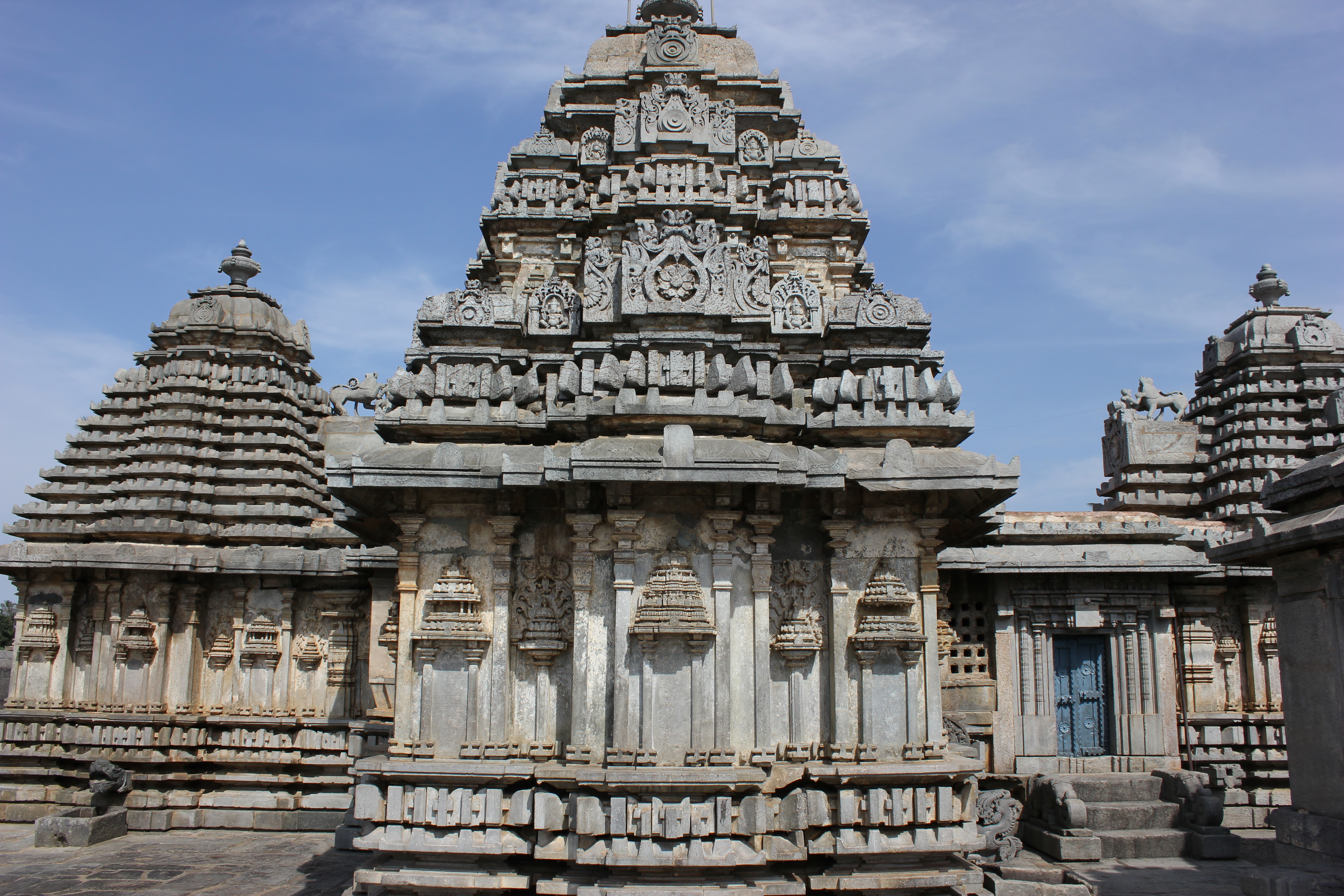
Kadamba shikhara (rear, left and right) and dravida shikhara (front) Lakshmi Devi temple at Doddagaddavalli

The temple complex is within a seven feet high praakara (compound), almost a 115 feet square. It had a dwara-mantapa to its west and a dwarashobha to its east, but these along with the original compound decoration is now missing except for the door frames and the mantapa-like structure. It is likely that the original town was near the manmade reservoir. Inside the historic praakara were four small shrines at each corner, a design called parivaralayas in Sanskrit texts. In addition, to the northeast of the main temple, there is a fifth independent shrine dedicated to Bhairava. At the center is the chatushkuta (four-shrine) main temple with a shared mantapa. Thus, the complex consists of nine shrines.

The Lakshmi Devi Temple is one of the earliest known temples built in the Hoysala style. The building material is Chloritic schist, more commonly known as soapstone.

The temple does not stand on a jagati (platform). Three of the vimanas (shrines) have a common square mantapa (hall). The fourth vimana, one at the north and dedicated to Kali, is connected to the mantapa via an oblong extension. The extension has two lateral entrances into the temple, one from east, the other west. The vimanas have their original phamsana-style tower (superstructure) intact. These illustrate the Kadamba Nagara architecture. Of the nine shrines in this complex, eight vimanas are simple phamsana and symmetric within each set. The ninth vimana that opens to the east is different – it is a tritala (three storey) superstructure and is dedicated to goddess Lakshmi, thus making her the primary deity and giving this temple its dedicatory name.

Each of the three vimanas that share a mandapa has an ardha-mantapa (vestibule) connecting it to the central larger square ranga-mantapa. On top of the vestibule of each shrine is a sukanasi (or "nose" because it looks like low extension of the main tower over the shrine). The sukanasi is a tier lower than the main phamsana tower over the shrine. All the four sukanasi are intact and so are the kalasha (decorative water pot like structure) on top of the main towers. The Hoysala emblem (the sculpture of a legendary warrior "Sala" fighting a lion) is mounted atop one of the Sukanasi.

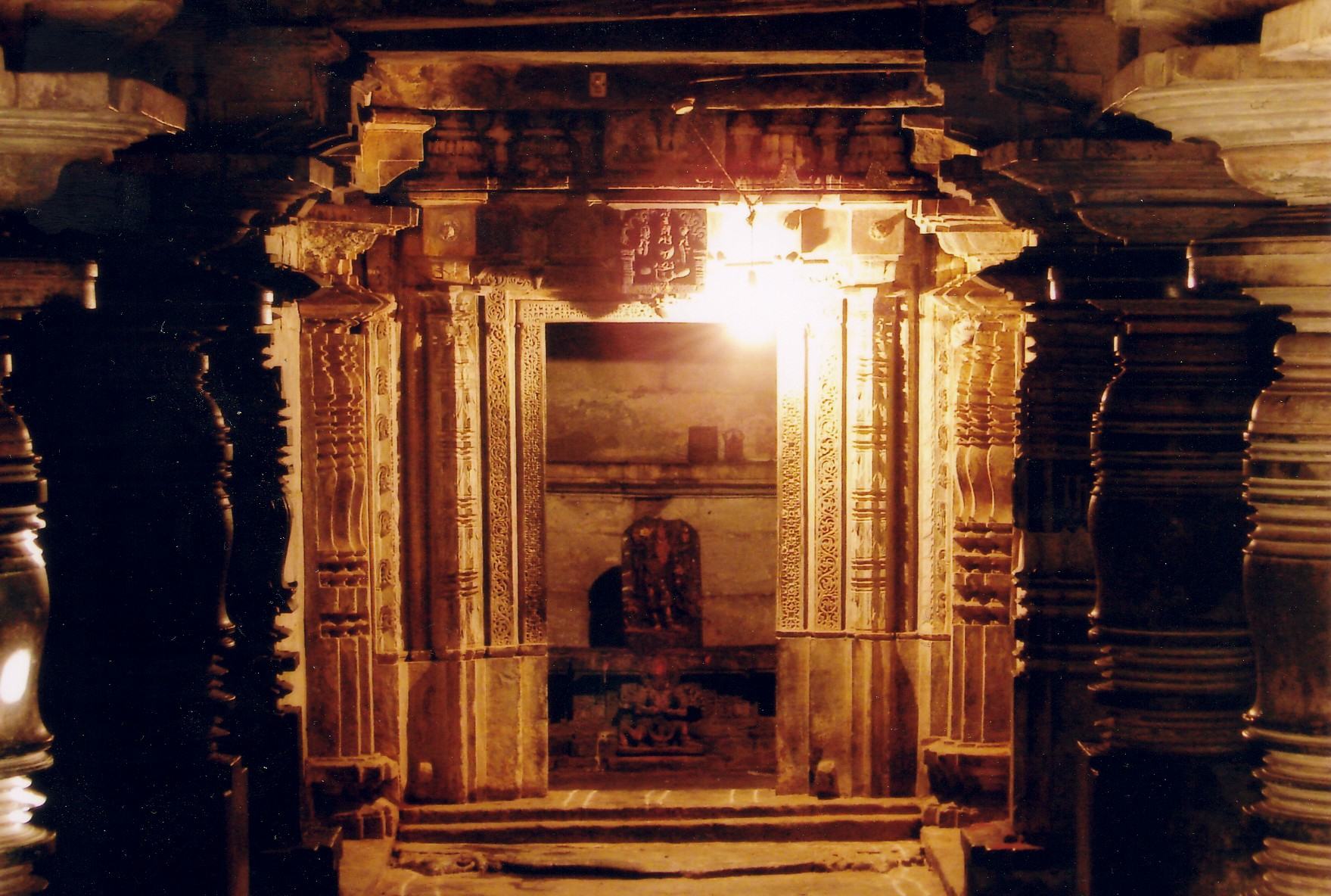
Doorjamb and lintel relief decoration before the Shiva cella

The mantapa is open and square. It and the extension to the Kali shrine has a jali (perforated stone screens) to let light into the temples. The ceiling of the main hall is supported by eighteen lathe-turned pillars. Near Kali's shrine, there is a stone statue of an emaciated skeleton-like goblin (vetala), a reminder of her horrifying fierceness and power to inflict death.

According to art critic Gerard Foekema, overall the temple has shows the pre-Hoysala elements of architecture. There is only one eaves running round the temple where the main towers meet the wall of the shrine. At the base of the wall of the shrines are five moldings; between the moldings and the eaves, the usual panels of Hoysala sculptures depicting Hindu gods, goddesses and their attendants is however missing. Instead, the entire space is taken up by decorative miniature towers on pilasters (called aedicule).

The main shrine facing east has a 3-foot-tall (0.91 m) image of the goddess Lakshmi with an attendant on either side. The image holds Vishnu's icons – a conch in the upper right hand, a chakra (discuss) in the upper left, a rosary in the lower right, and a mace in the lower left. In the shrines facing north, south and west respectively are the images of Kali (a form of Durga), the god Vishnu, and Boothanatha Linga (the universal symbol of the god Shiva). A sculpture of Tandaveswara (dancing Shiva) exists in the circular panel at the center of the ceiling of the mantapa. Other notable artwork are those of Gajalakshmi (form of Lakshmi with elephants on either side), Tandaveshwara and Yoganarasimha (avatars of Vishnu) found on the doorway of the temple.

== Gallery ==
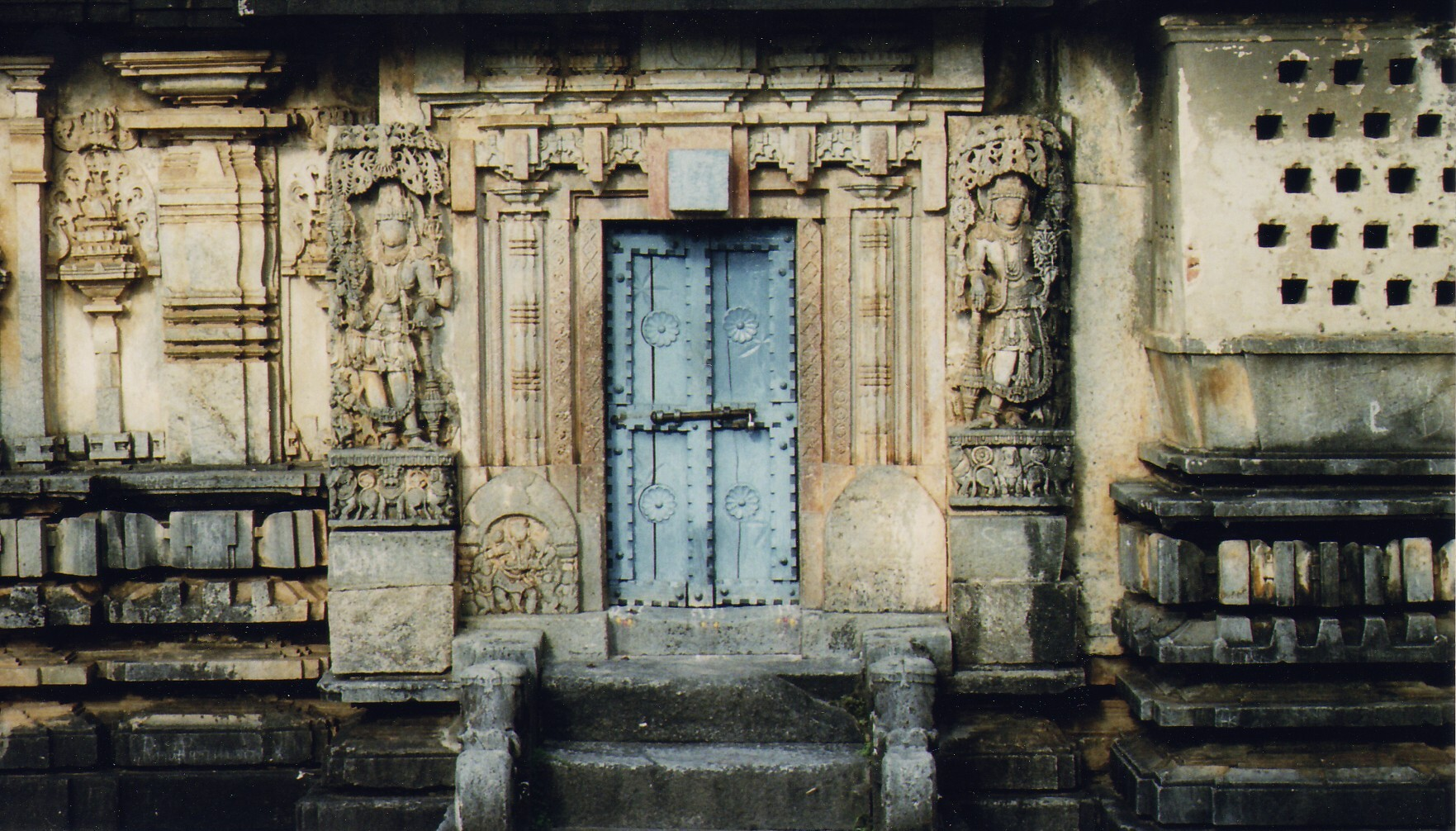
One of two entrances

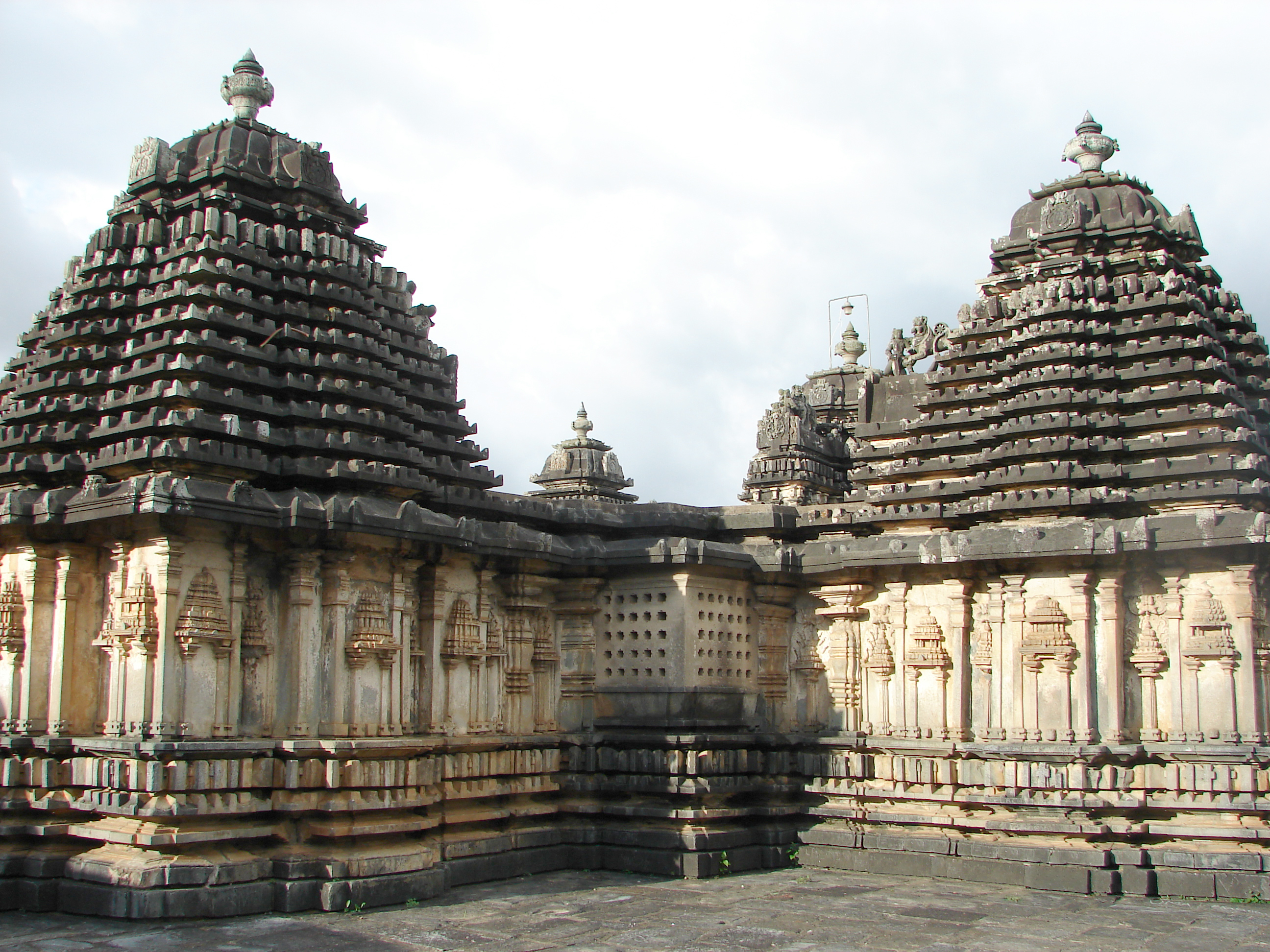
Kadamba shikhara (tower) with kalasha (pinnacle)

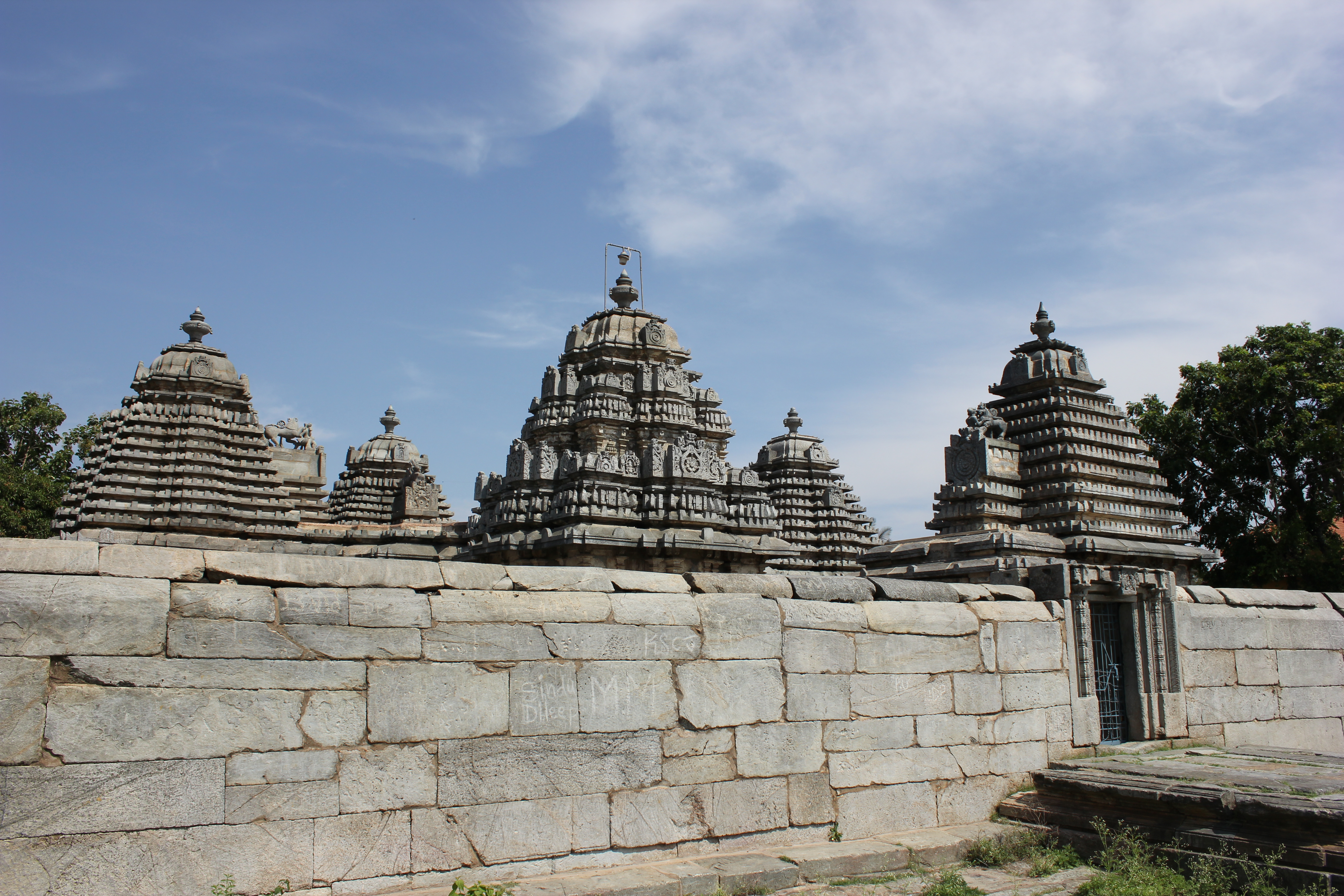
Prakara wall (west side)

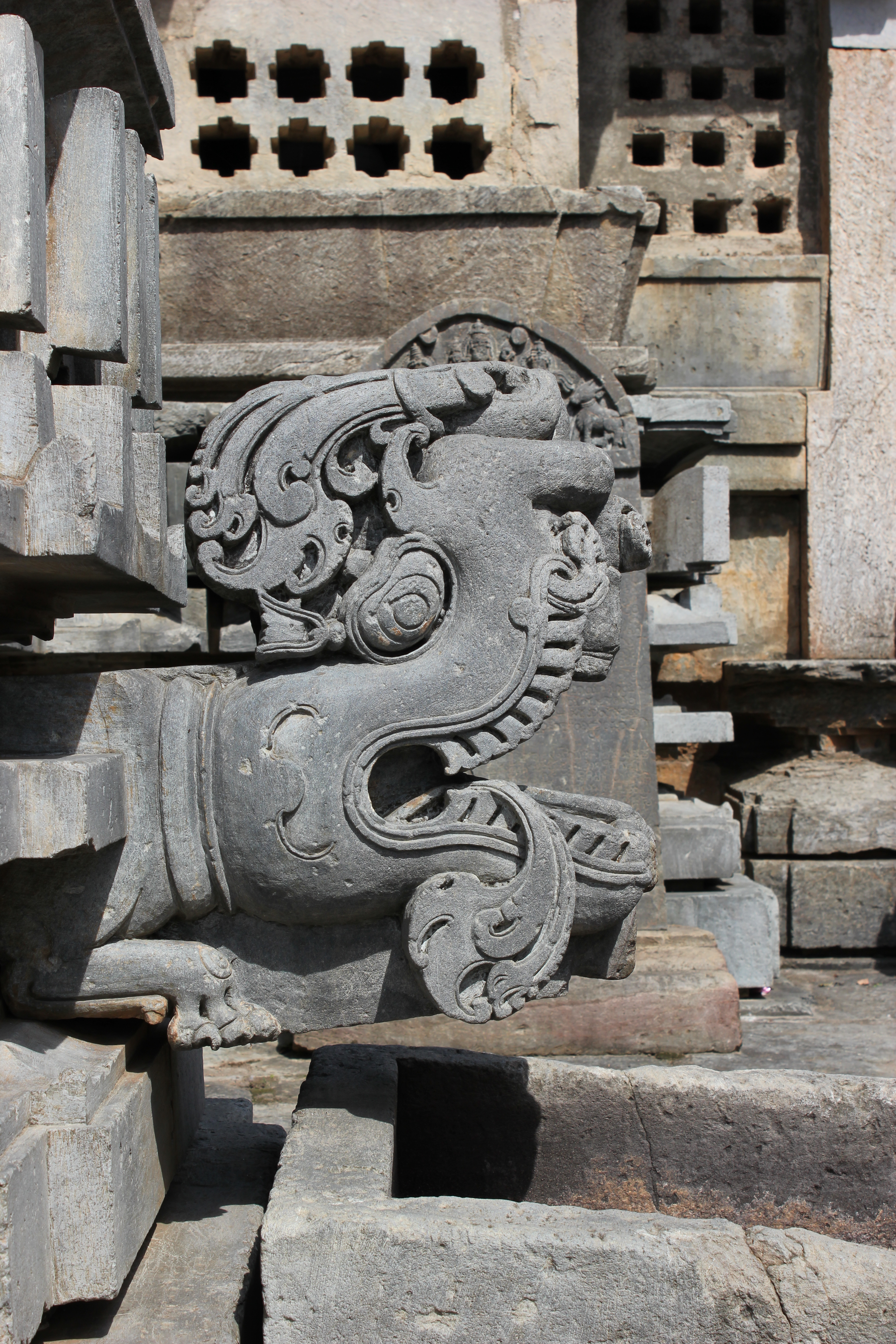
Makara-pranala, a spout to drain sanctum ritual water

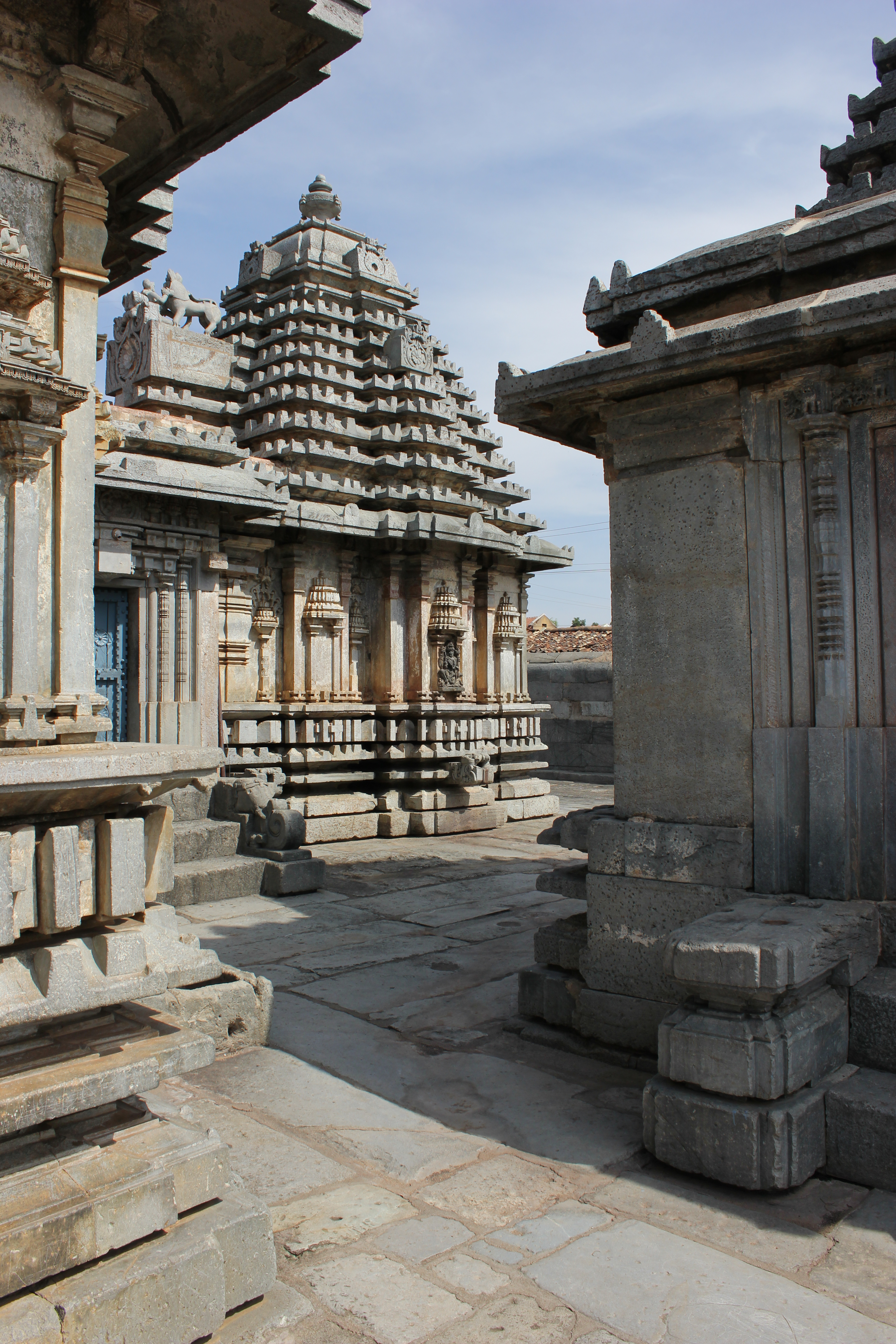
Kadamba nagara shikhara (tower)

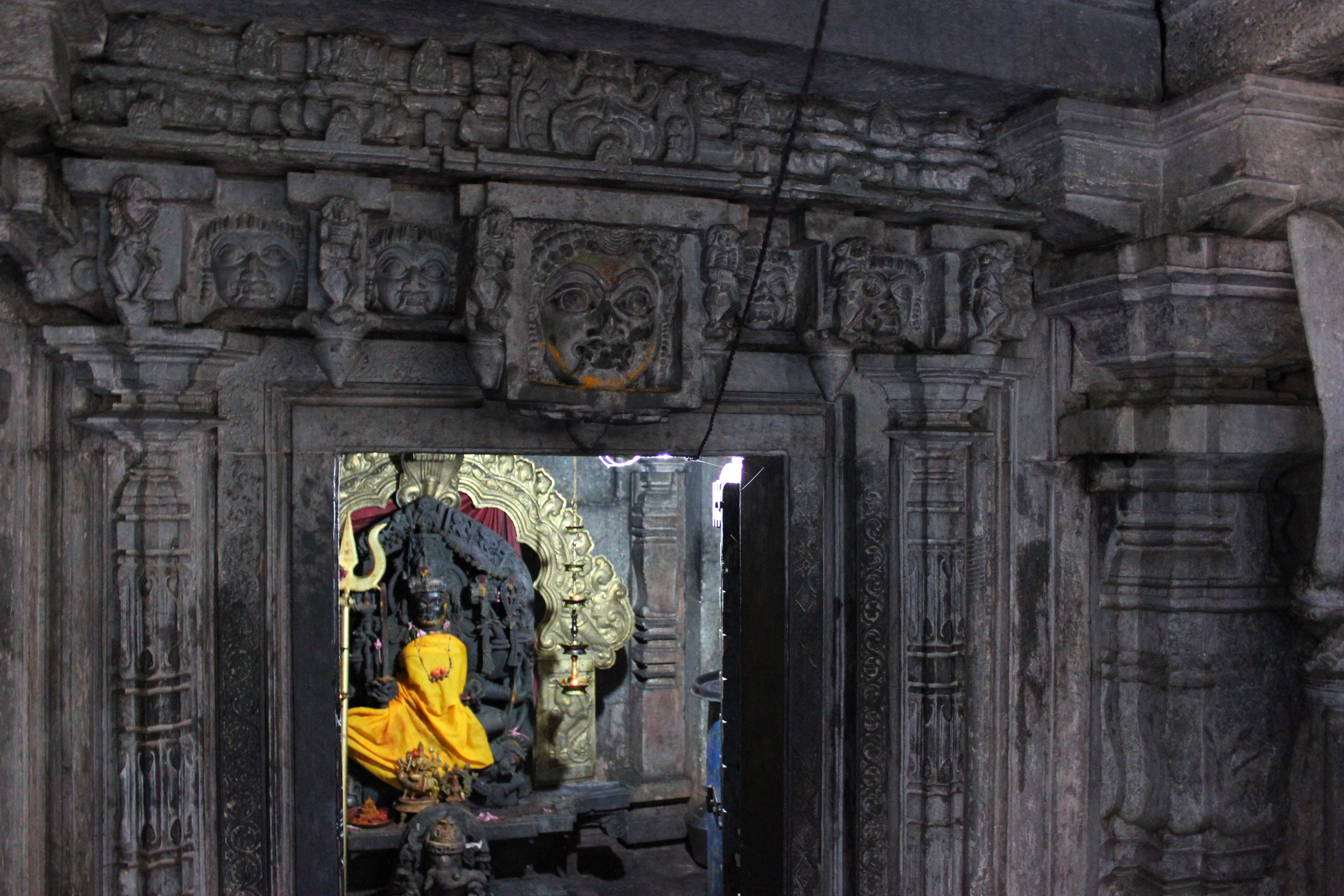
Ornate lintel over entrance into sanctum in Lakshmi Devi temple at Doddagaddavalli

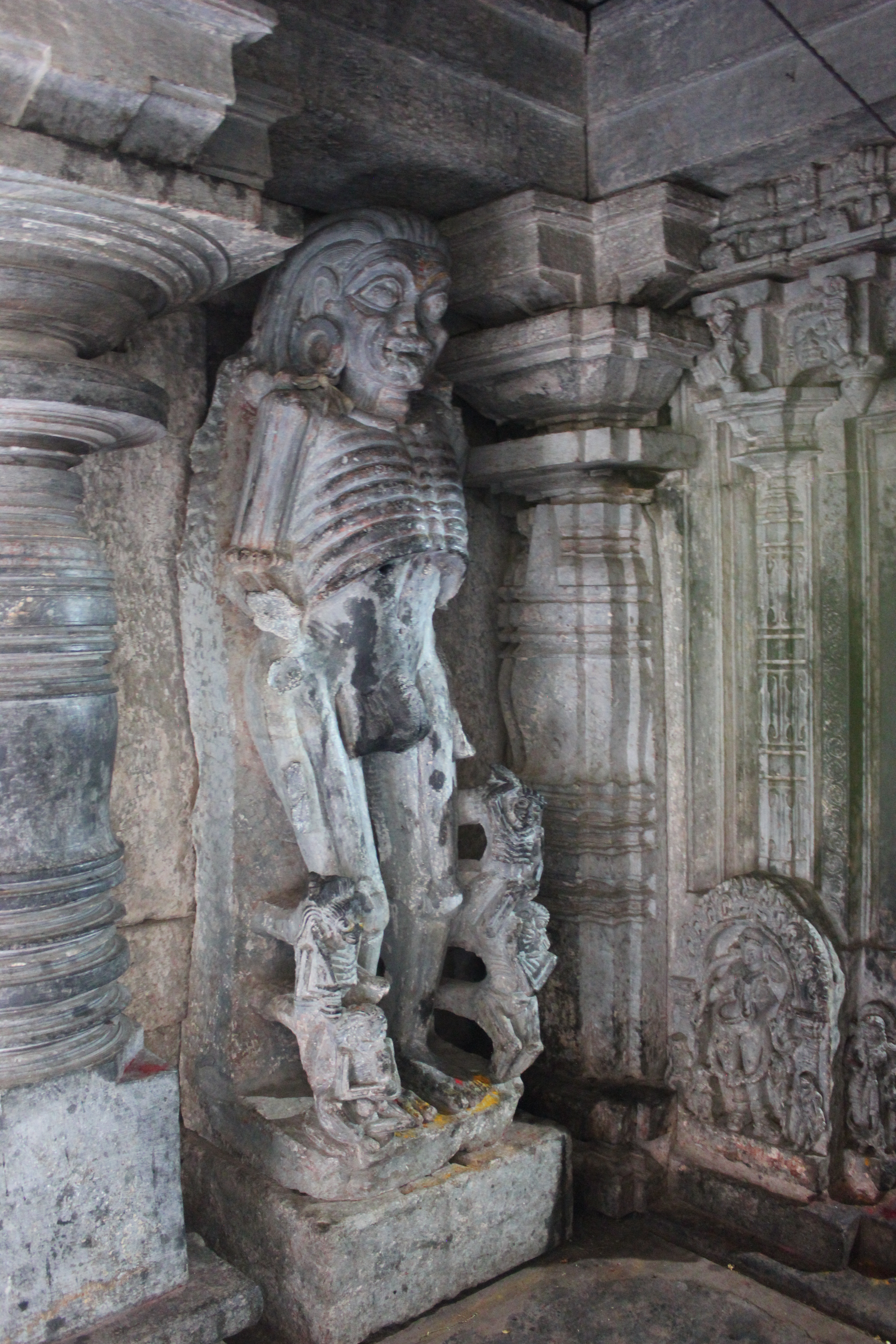
Emaciated goblin near Kali's shrine

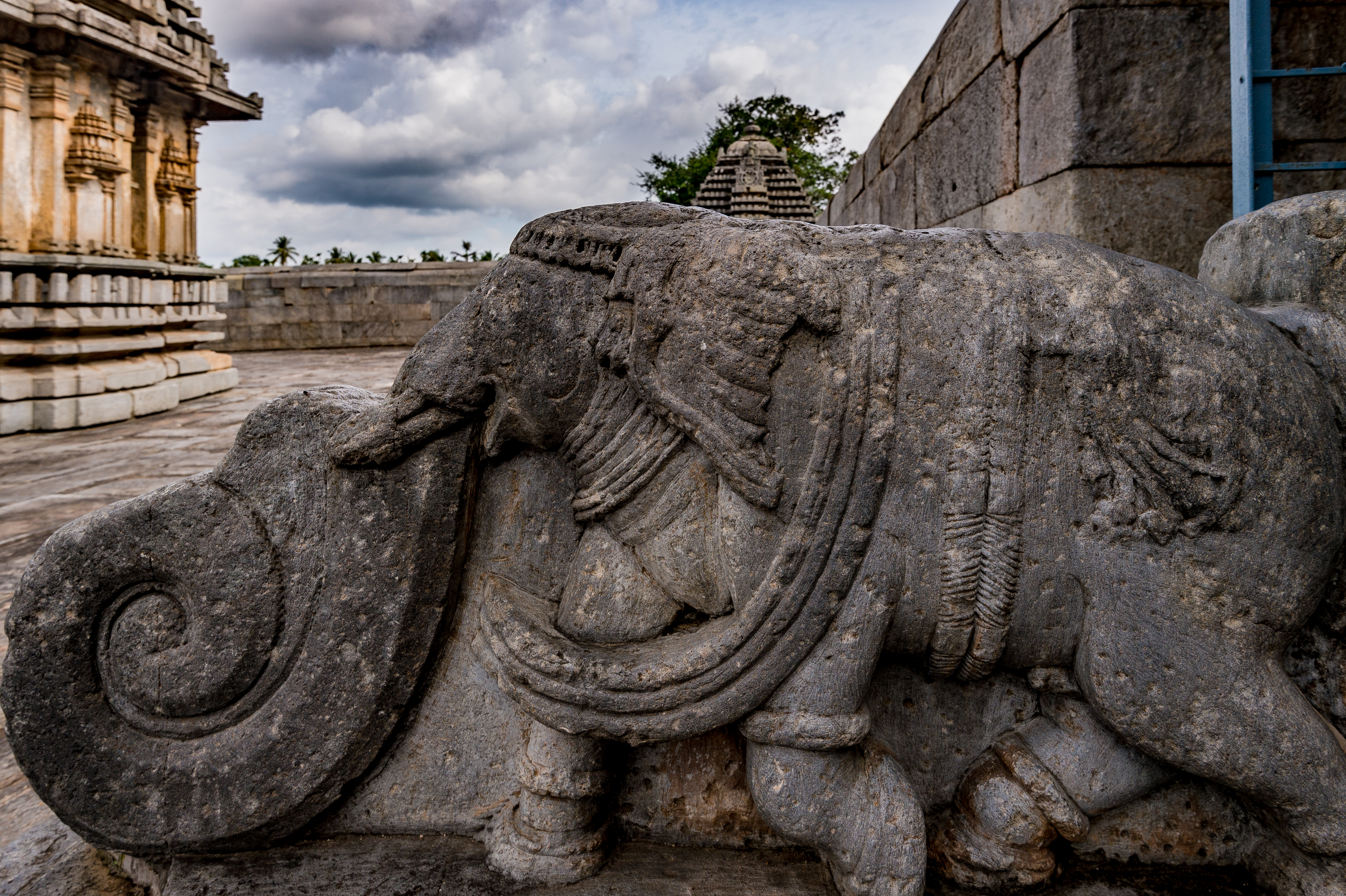
An Ornate Elephant balustrade at the main temple entrance

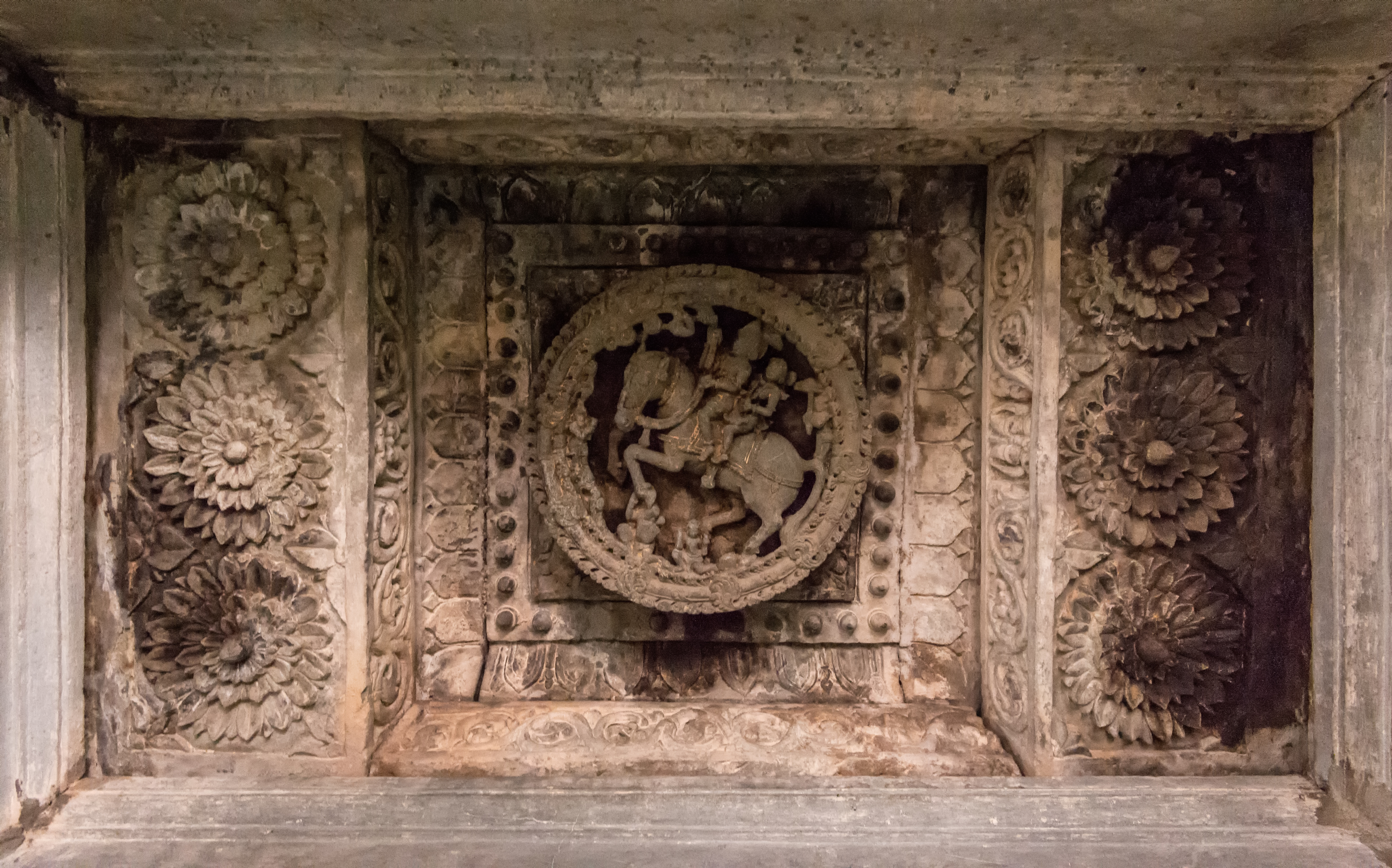
Ornated bay ceiling inside the temple

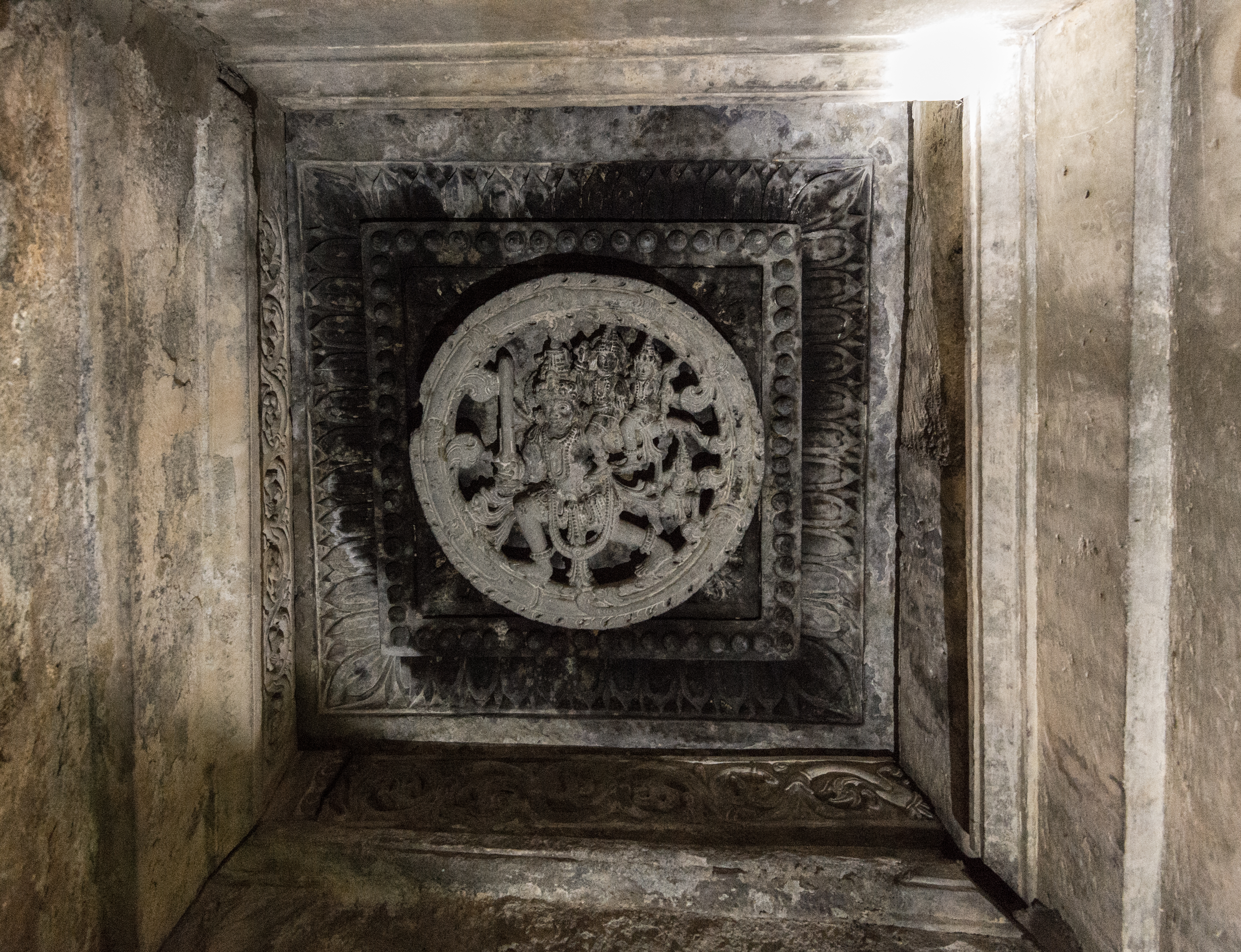
Ornate ceiling

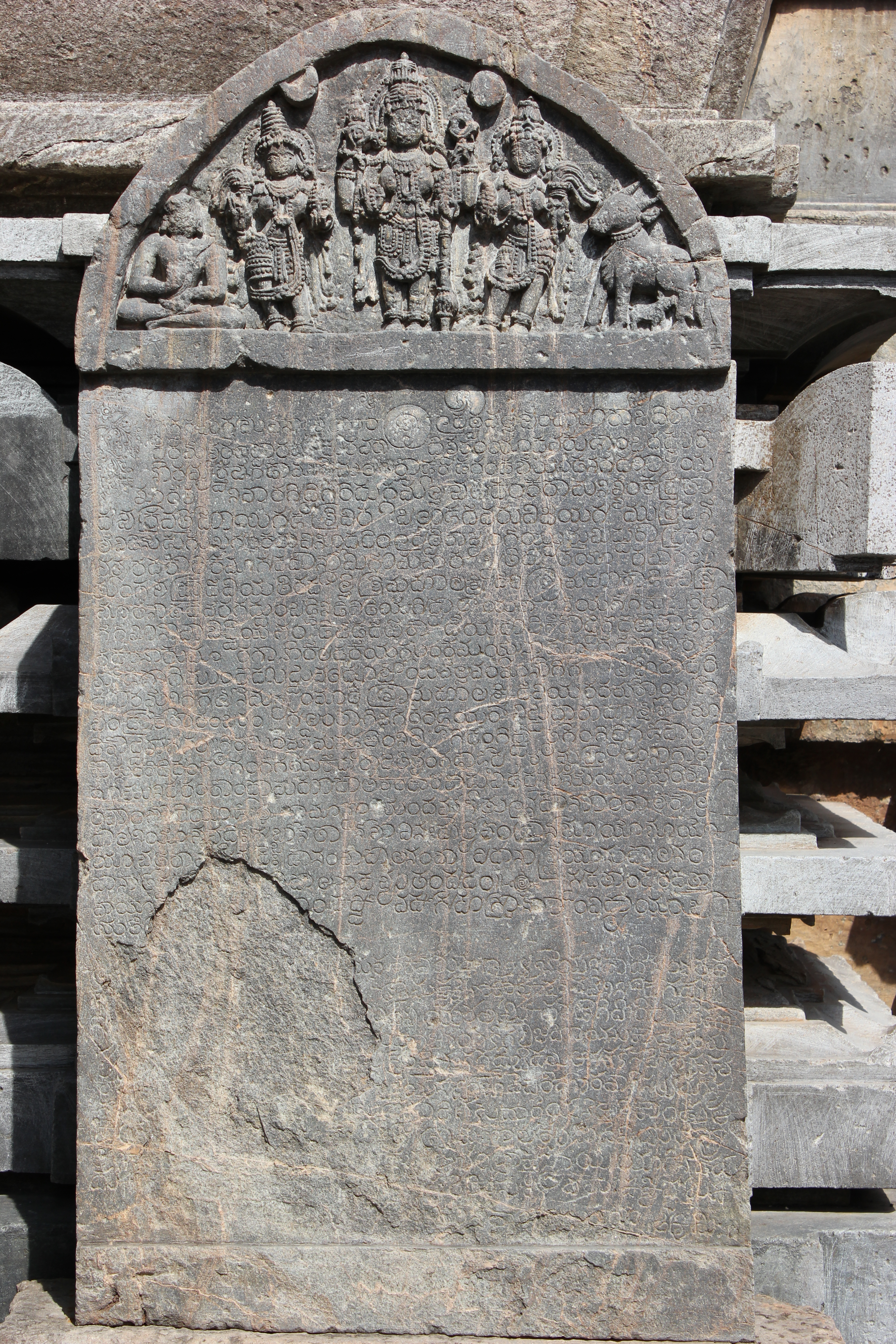
Old Kannada inscription
