= List of Monuments of National Importance in Madhya Pradesh/West =

The following structures in western Madhya Pradesh have been designated as Monuments of National Importance by the Archaeological Survey of India (ASI).

In this list, the ASI recognized monuments in the western part of Madhya Pradesh are described, in the districts Bhopal, Dewas, Dhar, Gwalior, Hoshangabad, Mandsaur, Morena, Burahanpur, Nimar (East), Nimar West, Shivpuri, Sehore and Ujjain. For the eastern part of Madhya Pradesh, see List of Monuments of National Importance in Madhya Pradesh/East.

SL. No.	Description	Location	Address	District	Coordinates	Image
N-MP-10	Kamlapati Palace	Bhopal		Bhopal	23°15′04″N 77°23′53″E	Kamlapati Palace
N-MP-54	Sidheshwara Temple	Nemawar		Dewas	22°29′35″N 76°58′40″E	Sidheshwara Temple More images
N-MP-55	Unfinished Sun Temple	Nemawar		Dewas	22°29′43″N 76°58′38″E	Upload Photo
N-MP-56	Alamgir Gate	Mandu		Dhar	22°21′46″N 75°23′36″E	Alamgir Gate More images
N-MP-57	Ancient Hindu Baodi	Mandu		Dhar	22°21′23″N 75°23′37″E	Ancient Hindu Baodi More images
N-MP-58	Andheri Baoli	Mandu		Dhar	22°21′28″N 75°23′44″E	Andheri Baoli More images
N-MP-59	Asharfi Mahal	Mandu		Dhar	22°20′54″N 75°23′57″E	Asharfi Mahal More images
N-MP-60	Baz Bahadur's Palace	Mandu		Dhar	22°18′49″N 75°24′29″E	Baz Bahadur's Palace More images
N-MP-61	Bhagwania Gate	Mandu		Dhar	22°18′44″N 75°25′02″E	Bhagwania Gate More images
N-MP-62	Bhangi Gate	Mandu		Dhar	22°21′43″N 75°23′37″E	Bhangi Gate More images
N-MP-63	Champa Baoli	Mandu		Dhar	22°21′24″N 75°23′32″E	Champa Baoli More images
N-MP-64	Chisti Khan's Mahal	Mandu		Dhar	22°21′37″N 75°24′09″E	Chisti Khan's Mahal More images
N-MP-65	Chor Kot	Mandu		Dhar	22°20′13″N 75°23′41″E	Chor Kot More images
N-MP-66	Chor Kot Mosque	Mandu		Dhar	22°20′13″N 75°23′40″E	Chor Kot Mosque More images
N-MP-67	Nahar Jharokha compound	Mandu		Dhar	22°21′27″N 75°23′36″E	Nahar Jharokha compound More images
N-MP-68	Dai-ka-Mahal	Mandu		Dhar	22°19′39″N 75°24′08″E	Dai-ka-Mahal More images
N-MP-69	Daike Chhoti Behen Ka Mahal	Mandu		Dhar	22°19′45″N 75°24′09″E	Daike Chhoti Behen Ka Mahal More images
N-MP-70	Darya Khan's Tomb	Mandu		Dhar	22°20′16″N 75°24′08″E	Darya Khan's Tomb More images
N-MP-71	Delhi Gate	Mandu		Dhar	22°21′40″N 75°23′46″E	Delhi Gate More images
N-MP-72	Dharmashala in the compound of Hoshang's Tomb	Mandu		Dhar	22°20′55″N 75°23′46″E	Dharmashala in the compound of Hoshang's Tomb More images
N-MP-73	Dilawar Khan's Mosque	Mandu		Dhar	22°21′28″N 75°23′31″E	Dilawar Khan's Mosque More images
N-MP-74	Ek Khamba Mahal	Mandu		Dhar	22°20′27″N 75°23′44″E	Ek Khamba Mahal More images
N-MP-75	Gada Shah's Palace	Mandu		Dhar	22°21′24″N 75°23′39″E	Gada Shah's Palace More images
N-MP-76	Gada Shah's Shop	Mandu		Dhar	22°21′26″N 75°23′45″E	Gada Shah's Shop More images
N-MP-77	Gadi Darwaza	Mandu		Dhar	22°21′36″N 75°23′54″E	Gadi Darwaza More images
N-MP-78	Hammam	Mandu		Dhar	22°21′26″N 75°23′30″E	Hammam More images
N-MP-79	Hathi Pole gate	Mandu		Dhar	22°21′30″N 75°23′40″E	Hathi Pole gate More images
N-MP-80	Hathi Mahal	Mandu		Dhar	22°20′10″N 75°24′16″E	Hathi Mahal More images
N-MP-81	Hindola Mahal	Mandu		Dhar	22°21′24″N 75°23′35″E	Hindola Mahal More images
N-MP-82	Hoshang Shah’s Tomb	Mandu		Dhar	22°20′54″N 75°23′47″E	Hoshang Shah’s Tomb More images
N-MP-83	Jahaz Mahal	Mandu		Dhar	22°21′20″N 75°23′35″E	Jahaz Mahal More images
N-MP-84	Jahangirpur Gate	Mandu		Dhar	22°19′12″N 75°25′00″E	Jahangirpur Gate More images
N-MP-85	Jama Masjid	Mandu		Dhar	22°20′54″N 75°23′52″E	Jama Masjid More images
N-MP-86	Kapoor Talao (Kapoor Tank) and the ruins on its bank	Mandu		Dhar	22°21′19″N 75°23′39″E	Kapoor Talao (Kapoor Tank) and the ruins on its bank More images
N-MP-87	Lal Bag	Mandu		Dhar	22°19′44″N 75°24′10″E	Lal Bag More images
N-MP-88	Lal Sarai	Mandu		Dhar	22°20′13″N 75°24′05″E	Upload Photo
N-MP-89	Lohani Gate	Mandu		Dhar	22°20′52″N 75°23′31″E	Lohani Gate More images
N-MP-90	Lohani Caves	Mandu		Dhar	22°20′53″N 75°23′32″E	Lohani Caves More images
N-MP-91	Jali Mahal	Mandu		Dhar	22°19′18″N 75°24′04″E	Jali Mahal More images
N-MP-92	Nahar Jharokha	Mandu		Dhar	22°21′28″N 75°23′36″E	Nahar Jharokha More images
N-MP-93	Mahmud Khilji's Tomb	Mandu		Dhar	22°20′54″N 75°23′57″E	Mahmud Khilji's Tomb More images
N-MP-94	Malik Mughith's Mosque	Mandu		Dhar	22°19′49″N 75°24′07″E	Malik Mughith's Mosque More images
N-MP-95	Mosque near Sopi Tank	Mandu		Dhar	22°21′08″N 75°23′52″E	Upload Photo
N-MP-96	Mosque North-west of Darya Khan's Tomb	Mandu		Dhar	22°20′17″N 75°24′06″E	Mosque North-west of Darya Khan's Tomb
N-MP-97	Mosque near Tarapur Gate	Mandu		Dhar	22°19′13″N 75°23′11″E	Upload Photo
N-MP-98	Nameless Tomb west of Shila Tank	Mandu		Dhar	22°21′05″N 75°23′19″E	Upload Photo
N-MP-99	Neelkantha (Nilkantheswar)	Mandu		Dhar	22°19′37″N 75°23′24″E	Neelkantha (Nilkantheswar) More images
N-MP-100	Rampol gate and the mosque apposite to it	Mandu		Dhar	22°21′01″N 75°24′08″E	Upload Photo
N-MP-101	Royal Palace in the west of Champa Baoli and Hammam	Mandu		Dhar	22°21′24″N 75°23′30″E	Royal Palace in the west of Champa Baoli and Hammam More images
N-MP-102	Roopmati's Pavalion	Mandu		Dhar	22°18′37″N 75°24′36″E	Roopmati's Pavalion More images
N-MP-103	Carvan Sarai	Mandu		Dhar	22°19′48″N 75°24′11″E	Carvan Sarai More images
N-MP-104	Sat kothari Caves	Mandu		Dhar	22°21′53″N 75°23′26″E	Sat kothari Caves More images
N-MP-105	Somavati Kund	Mandu		Dhar	22°20′16″N 75°24′07″E	Somavati Kund More images
N-MP-106	Songadh Gate	Mand		Dhar	22°19′45″N 75°22′48″E	Songadh Gate More images
N-MP-107	Tarapur Gate	Mandu		Dhar	22°19′03″N 75°23′19″E	Upload Photo
N-MP-108	Taveli Mahal	Mandu		Dhar	22°21′18″N 75°23′37″E	Taveli Mahal More images
N-MP-109	Tomb & Mosque between Chor kot mosque & Chhappan mahal	Mandu		Dhar	22°20′18″N 75°23′47″E	Upload Photo
N-MP-110	Tomb North of Daryakhan's tomb	Mandu		Dhar	22°20′18″N 75°24′08″E	Tomb North of Daryakhan's tomb
N-MP-111	Tomb North of Alamgir Gate	Mandu		Dhar	22°22′01″N 75°23′33″E	Tomb North of Alamgir Gate
N-MP-112	Tripolingate	Mandu		Dhar	22°20′53″N 75°23′54″E	Tripolingate
N-MP-113	Tower of Victory	Mandu		Dhar	22°20′54″N 75°23′55″E	Tower of Victory More images
N-MP-114	Ujali Baoli	Mandu		Dhar	22°21′29″N 75°23′46″E	Ujali Baoli
N-MP-115	Water palace	Mandu		Dhar	22°21′21″N 75°23′29″E	Water palace More images
N-MP-116	Ruins in the west of Rewa kund	Mandu		Dhar	22°18′49″N 75°24′23″E	Ruins in the west of Rewa kund
N-MP-117	Bhojshala and Kamal Maula's Mosque	Dhar		Dhar	22°35′26″N 75°17′42″E	Bhojshala and Kamal Maula's Mosque
N-MP-118	Lat-ki-Masjid	Dhar		Dhar	22°35′03″N 75°17′53″E	Lat-ki-Masjid
N-MP-119	Buddhist Caves No.1 to 7	Bagh		Dhar	22°19′21″N 74°48′22″E	Buddhist Caves No.1 to 7
N-MP-120	Water palace	Sadalpur		Dhar	22°44′22″N 75°24′44″E	Upload Photo
N-MP-121	Rock cut temple	Wasvi		Dhar	22°16′33″N 75°31′08″E	Upload Photo
N-MP-141	Mahadeva temple	Amrol		Gwalior	26°01′46″N 78°06′54″E	Mahadeva temple More images
N-MP-142	Ancient site	Pawaya		Gwalior	25°46′59″N 78°14′24″E	Ancient site More images
N-MP-143	Tila Monument	Pawaya		Gwalior	25°46′59″N 78°14′24″E	Tila Monument More images
N-MP-144	Tomb of Abul Fazal	Antri		Gwalior	26°03′37″N 78°12′36″E	Upload Photo
N-MP-145	Tomb of Tansen and two mosque's	Gwalior		Gwalior	26°13′54″N 78°10′45″E	Tomb of Tansen and two mosque's More images
N-MP-146-a	Gwalior Fort:Badal Gate or Hindola Gate	Gwalior		Gwalior	26°14′02″N 78°10′18″E	Gwalior Fort:Badal Gate or Hindola Gate More images
N-MP-146-b	Gwalior Fort:Gwalior or Alamgiri gate	Gwalior		Gwalior	26°14′02″N 78°10′19″E	Gwalior Fort:Gwalior or Alamgiri gate More images
N-MP-146-c	Gwalior Fort:Ganesa gate	Gwalior		Gwalior	26°13′56″N 78°10′16″E	Gwalior Fort:Ganesa gate More images
N-MP-146-d	Gwalior Fort:Chaturbhuj temple	Gwalior		Gwalior	26°13′51″N 78°10′12″E	Gwalior Fort:Chaturbhuj temple More images
N-MP-146-e	Gwalior Fort:Lakshmangate	Gwalior		Gwalior	26°13′52″N 78°10′12″E	Upload Photo
N-MP-146-f	Gwalior Fort:Mansingh's palace	Gwalior		Gwalior	26°13′50″N 78°10′08″E	Gwalior Fort:Mansingh's palace More images
N-MP-146-g1	Gwalior Fort:Gopachal-Patthar ki Baoli Rock-cut Jain colossi	Gwalior		Gwalior	26°12′55″N 78°10′03″E	Gwalior Fort:Gopachal-Patthar ki Baoli Rock-cut Jain colossi More images
N-MP-146-g2	Gwalior Fort:Siddhanchal Rock-cut Jain colossi	Gwalior		Gwalior	26°13′25″N 78°09′52″E	Gwalior Fort:Siddhanchal Rock-cut Jain colossi More images
N-MP-146-g3	Gwalior Fort:Mata Trishala Rock-cut Jain colossi	Gwalior		Gwalior	26°13′16″N 78°09′44″E	Gwalior Fort:Mata Trishala Rock-cut Jain colossi More images
N-MP-146-g4	Gwalior Fort:Neminath Group of Jain Colossi	Gwalior		Gwalior	26°13′55″N 78°10′02″E	Upload Photo
N-MP-146-g5	Gwalior Fort:North East Group of Jain colossi	Gwalior		Gwalior	26°13′55″N 78°10′14″E	Upload Photo
N-MP-146-h	Gwalior Fort:Sahasrabahu (Sas-Bahu) temple	Gwalior		Gwalior	26°13′25″N 78°10′13″E	Gwalior Fort:Sahasrabahu (Sas-Bahu) temple More images
N-MP-146-i	Gwalior Fort:Teli ka Mandir	Gwalior		Gwalior	26°13′13″N 78°09′56″E	Gwalior Fort:Teli ka Mandir More images
N-MP-146-j	Gwalior Fort:Urwai Gate	Gwalior		Gwalior	26°13′21″N 78°09′43″E	Upload Photo
N-MP-147	Tomb of Mohammad Ghauz	Ghauspura		Gwalior	26°13′54″N 78°10′47″E	Tomb of Mohammad Ghauz More images
N-MP-148	Rock Shelter	Baldeo Kundi		Gwalior		Upload Photo
N-MP-149	Caves popularly known as Pandav Caves	Pachmarhi		Narmadapuram	22°27′30″N 78°25′56″E	Caves popularly known as Pandav Caves More images
N-MP-150	Old Mughal Fort	Joga		Narmadapuram	22°25′40″N 76°47′45″E	Old Mughal Fort More images
N-MP-151	Adamgarh rock shelter with paintings	Kalmadi Rasulia		Narmadapuram	22°43′48″N 77°44′01″E	Adamgarh rock shelter with paintings More images
N-MP-152	Rock Shelter known as Pulti lane near Sambourne cave	Karian		Narmadapuram	22°29′00″N 78°28′03″E	Upload Photo
N-MP-153	Dorothy deep Rock Shelter	Pachmarhi		Narmadapuram	22°30′14″N 78°23′43″E	Dorothy deep Rock Shelter
N-MP-176	Brahmanical Rock temple	Dhamnar		Mandsaur	24°11′38″N 75°29′56″E	Brahmanical Rock temple More images
N-MP-177	Buddhist Caves (No. 1 to 51)	Dhamnar		Mandsaur	24°11′36″N 75°29′54″E	Buddhist Caves (No. 1 to 51) More images
N-MP-178	Nav Toran Temple	Khor		Neemuch	24°11′36″N 75°29′54″E	Nav Toran Temple More images
N-MP-179	Yashodharman's pillar of Victory	Sondani		Mandsaur	24°02′29″N 75°05′31″E	Yashodharman's pillar of Victory More images
N-MP-180	Ekattatso Mahadeva temple	Mitaoli		Morena	26°26′13″N 78°14′07″E	Ekattatso Mahadeva temple More images
N-MP-181	Gadhi	Padavali		Morena	26°25′53″N 78°12′05″E	Gadhi More images
N-MP-182	Temple	Padavali		Morena	26°25′52″N 78°12′06″E	Temple More images
N-MP-183	Siva temple (Locally known as Kakanmath temple)	Sihoniya		Morena	26°35′06″N 78°14′55″E	Siva temple (Locally known as Kakanmath temple) More images
N-MP-184	Temple No. 1 to 22	Naresar		Morena	26°20′17″N 78°15′32″E	Temple No. 1 to 22 More images
N-MP-185	Group of temples	Bateshwar		Morena	26°25′33″N 78°11′47″E	Group of temples More images
N-MP-186	Tomb of Shah Nawaz Khan	Burhanpur		Burhanpur	21°19′42″N 76°14′35″E	Tomb of Shah Nawaz Khan More images
N-MP-187	Tomb of Adil Shah Faruki	Burhanpur		Burhanpur	21°19′12″N 76°14′52″E	Tomb of Adil Shah Faruki More images
N-MP-188	Tomb of Begum Shah Shuja & compound	Burhanpur		Burhanpur	21°19′21″N 76°14′37″E	Upload Photo
N-MP-189	Tomb of Nadir Shah & compound	Burhanpur		Burhanpur	21°19′12″N 76°14′51″E	Tomb of Nadir Shah & compound More images
N-MP-190	RajaJay Singh Ki Chhatri near Bardhaghat	Burhanpur		Burhanpur	21°15′46″N 76°12′47″E	RajaJay Singh Ki Chhatri near Bardhaghat
N-MP-191	Bibi -Sahib's Masjid and compound	Burhanpur		Burhanpur	21°18′56″N 76°14′15″E	Bibi -Sahib's Masjid and compound More images
N-MP-192	The palace situated in the fort	Burhanpur		Burhanpur	21°18′27″N 76°14′13″E	The palace situated in the fort More images
N-MP-193	Hammam Khana	Chowk Mohalla		Burhanpur	21°18′39″N 76°14′00″E	Hammam Khana More images
N-MP-194	Tomb of Noman shah	Asirgarh		Burhanpur	21°28′19″N 76°16′37″E	Upload Photo
N-MP-195	Chudi walon ki Masjid	Burhanpur		Burhanpur	21°19′13″N 76°14′19″E	Upload Photo
N-MP-196	The Whole fort including all walls	Asirgarh		Burhanpur	21°28′19″N 76°17′34″E	The Whole fort including all walls More images
N-MP-197	Asireshwar Mahadeva temple	Asirgarh		Burhanpur	21°28′11″N 76°16′48″E	Upload Photo
N-MP-198	Idgah, front wall with open platform	Asirgarh		Burhanpur	21°28′21″N 76°17′39″E	Idgah, front wall with open platform More images
N-MP-199	Mahal Gulara palaces and building on both sides of Utoali river and two masonry dams in the river	Mahal Gul Aarah		Burhanpur	21°19′52″N 76°20′44″E	Upload Photo
N-MP-200	Ahukhana site with compound wall, the pavilion and tank	Ahukhana		Burhanpur	21°18′33″N 76°14′48″E	Ahukhana site with compound wall, the pavilion and tank More images
N-MP-201	Chaubis avtar temple with its contents	Mandhata		Khandwa	22°15′13″N 76°09′55″E	Chaubis avtar temple with its contents More images
N-MP-202	Chand Suraj Gateway	Mandhata		Khandwa	22°14′51″N 76°09′14″E	Chand Suraj Gateway More images
N-MP-203	Siddeswara of Sidhanath temple	Mandhata		Khandwa	22°14′45″N 76°09′21″E	Siddeswara of Sidhanath temple More images
N-MP-204	Mamleshwara alias amleswara temple	Mandhata		Khandwa	22°14′33″N 76°09′02″E	Mamleshwara alias amleswara temple More images
N-MP-205	Chaubara Dera	Khargone		Khargone	21°49′18″N 75°27′16″E	Chaubara Dera More images
N-MP-206	Jain temple No. 1 to 3	Khargone		Khargone	21°49′11″N 75°27′25″E	Jain temple No. 1 to 3 More images
N-MP-207	Temple of Mahakaleswara No.1&2	Khargone		Khargone	21°49′12″N 75°27′37″E	Temple of Mahakaleswara No.1&2 More images
N-MP-208	Temple of Nilkantheswara	Khargone		Khargone	21°49′21″N 75°27′27″E	Temple of Nilkantheswara More images
N-MP-209	Excavated site	Kasrawad		Khargone		Upload Photo
N-MP-210	Brindaban dedicated to the memory of srimant Bajirao Peshwa	Raverkhedi		Khargone	22°10′26″N 75°52′44″E	Brindaban dedicated to the memory of srimant Bajirao Peshwa More images
N-MP-211	Main gate and remaining portion of the Peshwa residence or fortress	Raverkhedi		Khargone	22°10′20″N 75°52′40″E	Main gate and remaining portion of the Peshwa residence or fortress More images
N-MP-212	The Chhatri inside the Sarai	Raverkhedi		Khargone	22°10′24″N 75°52′35″E	The Chhatri inside the Sarai More images
N-MP-213	Old Sarai	Raverkhedi		Khargone	22°10′24″N 75°52′35″E	Old Sarai More images
N-MP-256	Large Siva Temple	Mahua		Shivpuri	25°02′02″N 77°57′22″E	Large Siva Temple More images
N-MP-257	Small Siva Temple	Mahua		Shivpuri	25°02′07″N 77°57′33″E	Small Siva Temple More images
N-MP-258	Monastery Khokhaimath	Ranod		Shivpuri	25°05′08″N 77°52′49″E	Monastery Khokhaimath More images
N-MP-259	Monastery	Survaya		Shivpuri	25°25′11″N 77°49′54″E	Monastery More images
N-MP-260	Siva Temple	Survaya		Shivpuri	25°25′12″N 77°49′55″E	Siva Temple More images
N-MP-261	Open Air Museum	Survaya		Shivpuri	25°25′12″N 77°49′54″E	Upload Photo
N-MP-262	Gadhi Survaya	Survaya		Shivpuri	25°25′12″N 77°49′51″E	Upload Photo
N-MP-263	Mohajamata temple	Terahi		Shivpuri	25°02′44″N 77°56′57″E	Mohajamata temple More images
N-MP-264	Monastery	Terahi		Shivpuri	25°02′41″N 77°57′32″E	Monastery More images
N-MP-265	Torana gate	Terahi		Shivpuri	25°02′44″N 77°56′58″E	Torana gate More images
N-MP-267	Buddhist stupas along with saru-maru monastric complex	Panguraria		Sehore	22°43′54″N 77°31′07″E	Buddhist stupas along with saru-maru monastric complex More images
N-MP-268	Painted Rock Shelters, Buddhist stupas and other remains	Talpura		Sehore	22°47′52″N 77°39′21″E	Painted Rock Shelters, Buddhist stupas and other remains More images
N-MP-269	Ancient Mound	Bhairgarh		Ujjain		Ancient Mound More images
N-MP-270	Ancient Mound (Vishya Tekri)	Undasa		Ujjain	23°12′41″N 75°49′03″E	Ancient Mound (Vishya Tekri) More images
N-MP-271	Ancient Mound(Kumbhar tekri)	Undasa		Ujjain	23°12′43″N 75°48′55″E	Ancient Mound(Kumbhar tekri) More images
N-MP-290	Town Hall alias Gandhi Bhawan	Shivpuri		Shivpuri	25°25′37″N 77°39′02″E	Upload Photo
N-MP-291	Prehistoric Painted Rock Shelters at Chatarbhuj Nala	Bhanpura		Mandsaur	24°40′59″N 75°39′58″E	Prehistoric Painted Rock Shelters at Chatarbhuj Nala More images
N-MP-292	Prehistoric Painted Rock Shelters at Sita Khadi	Bhanpura		Mandsaur	24°32′51″N 75°43′47″E	Prehistoric Painted Rock Shelters at Sita Khadi More images

== See also ==
- Madhya Pradesh/East remainder of divided list of Monuments in Madhya Pradesh
- Lists of monuments in India - for other Monuments of National Importance in India
