= Talpura =

Tālpurā तालपुरा
- Buddhist site
- Possible location in present-day Madhya Pradesh, India Tālpurā (Madhya Pradesh)
- Coordinates: 22.47°N 77.39°E
- Country: India
- State: Madhya Pradesh
- District: Sehore
- Elevation: 300 m (980 ft)

Languages
  - Official: Hindi
- Time zone: UTC+5:30 (IST)

Tālpurā (Hindi तालपुरा) in Sehore district, Madhya Pradesh, is an ancient Buddhist site near Hoshangabad overlooking the Narmada River. It dates to the early centuries BCE and consists of two stupas, one with remains of a stone railing carved with lotus medallions and other designs similar to those seen at Sanchi. Next to the stupas is a rock shelter with paintings.

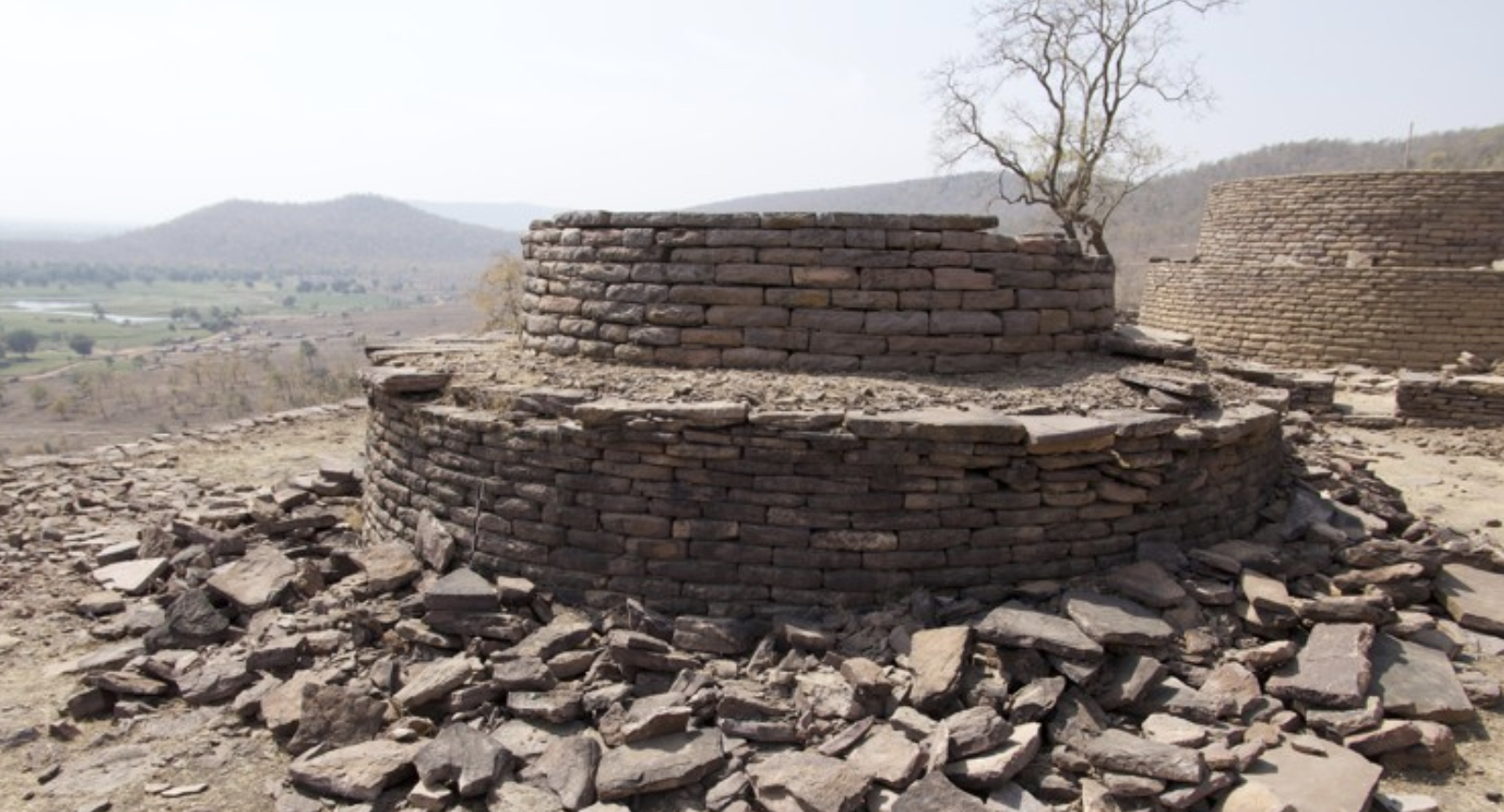
Buddhist stūpa at Tālpurā (Sehore district) Madhya Pradesh.

Tālpurā appears in the List of Monuments of National Importance in Madhya Pradesh/West and is centrally protected by the Archaeological Survey of India.
