= Hindola Mahal =

Historical site in India

Coordinates: 22°21′24″N 75°23′35″E

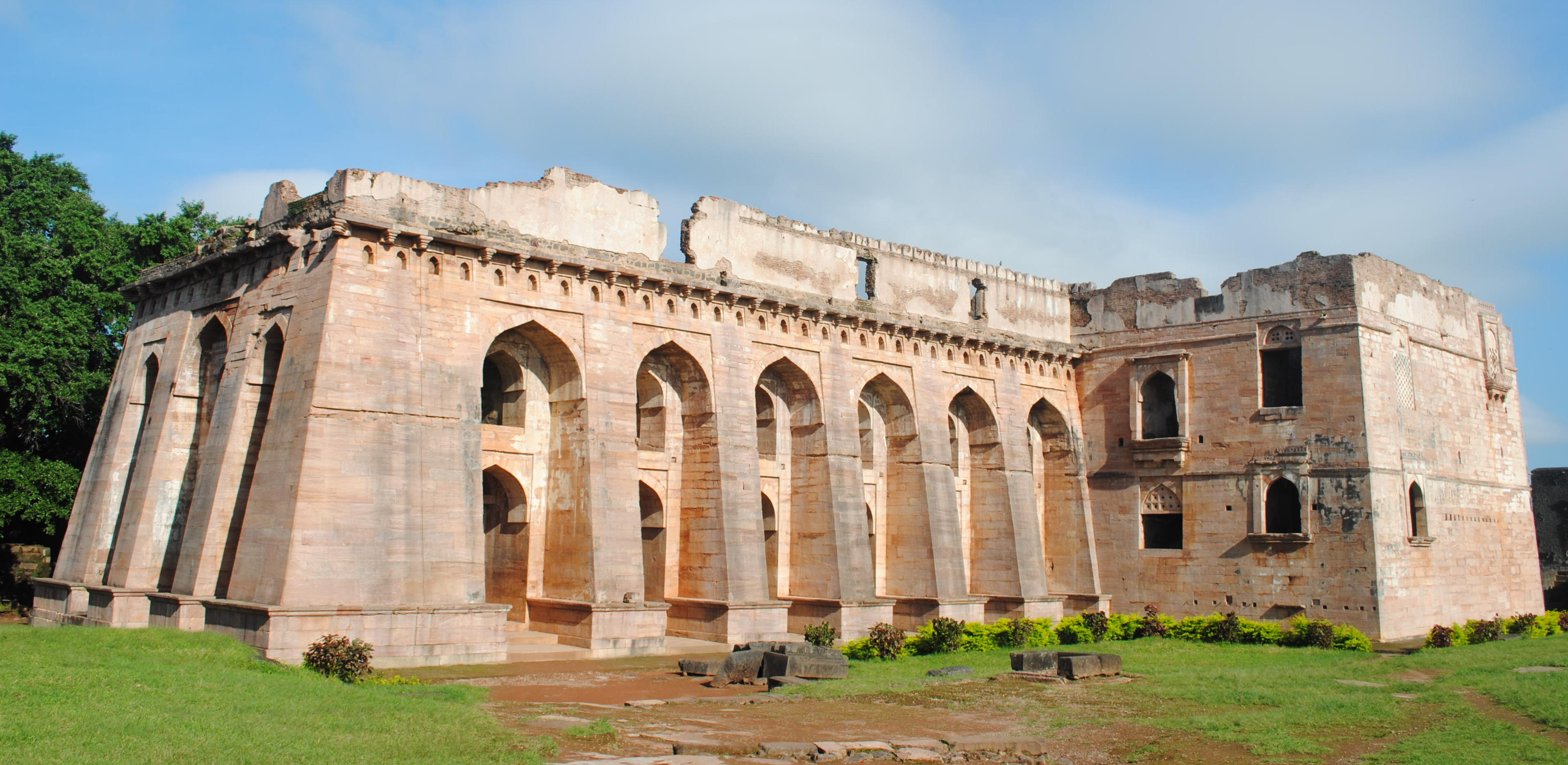
The Hindola Mahal, part of Royal Enclave group of monuments in Mandu.

The Hindola Mahal (English translation: “Swinging Palace”), is a large meeting hall, or durbar, in the ancient Indian city of Mandu, Madhya Pradesh. Today the Hindola Mahal is a tourist destination in the ruined city.

== History ==
The Hindola Mahal might have been constructed during the reign of Hoshang Shah about 1425 C.E. but may date to the end of the 15th century during the reign of Ghiyas-al-Din. It is one of a set buildings making up the royal palace complex at Mandu, which consists of the Jahaz Mahal, the Hindola Mahal, the Tawili Mahal, and the Nahar Jharokha. The Hindola Mahal may have been used as an audience chamber.

== Architecture ==
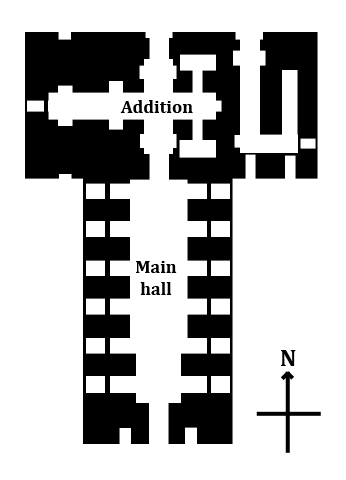
The plan of the Hindola Mahal

The plan of the Hindola Mahal is a T-shape, though examination of the exterior walls leads to the conclusion that the crossbar was added later. The vertical mast of the plan consists of one main hall measuring 30 by 18 metres (98 by 59 feet) and 12 metres (39 feet) high. Its lateral walls are 3 metres (9.8 feet) thick and further reinforced by massive, inclined buttresses that angle over 77 degrees. These highly inclined buttresses give the Hindola Mahal (Swinging Palace) its name. They also neutralize the outward force of five massive ogee arches that once supported the large flat roof of the main hall. On each exterior of the long sides of the main hall are six recessed arches which hold doors in their lower sections and three slabs of open-work stone windows to let in air and light. A high wall holds battlements on the roof of the building.

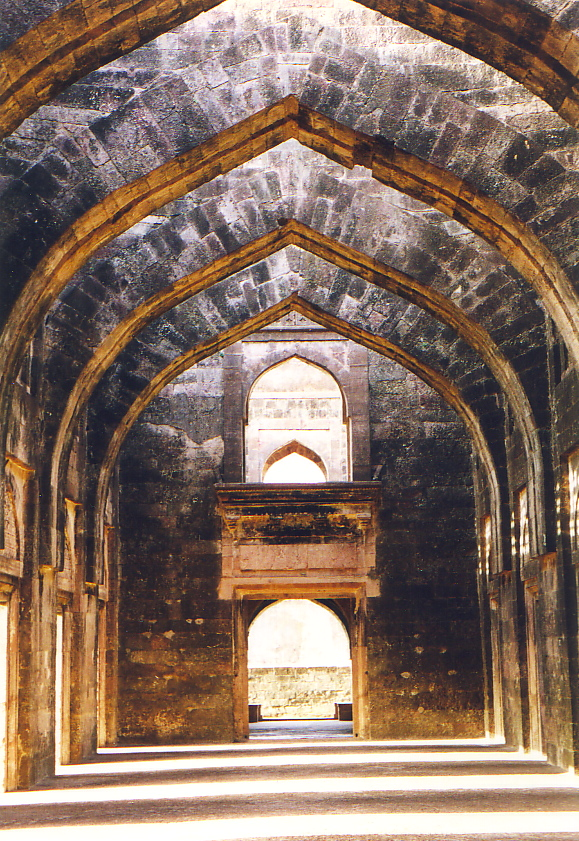
The ogee arches of the Hindola Mahal

The crossbar of the Hindola Mahal is of about the same proportions as the main hall but is split into two tiers. The upper floor, which is divided into two rooms, looks onto the main hall through an arched opening. The ground floor consists of a cruciform gallery with arms that extend to another entrance to the building and an arch to the main hall.

The Hindola Mahal represents the characteristic elements of the architectural style of the Malwa period (1400–1550): simplicity, boldness, and well-proportioned. The Hindola Mahal emphasizes its architectural simplicity with minimal ornamentation and stands out boldly through massive, inclined buttresses. These elements make the Hindola Mahal a unique exaggerated example of the Malwa style. In addition, the pointed arches on the building’s interior reflect how Malwa architecture was influenced by the Delhi styles.

== Fort of Warangal ==
An almost exact copy of the Hindola Mahal can be found in the fort of Warangal in the Deccan. The copy, possibly constructed by the same architect, is built on a smaller scale and, unlike the Hindola Mahal, holds a water cistern in the center of the main hall.
