= Kamlapati Palace =

Building in Bhopal, India

Kamlapati palace
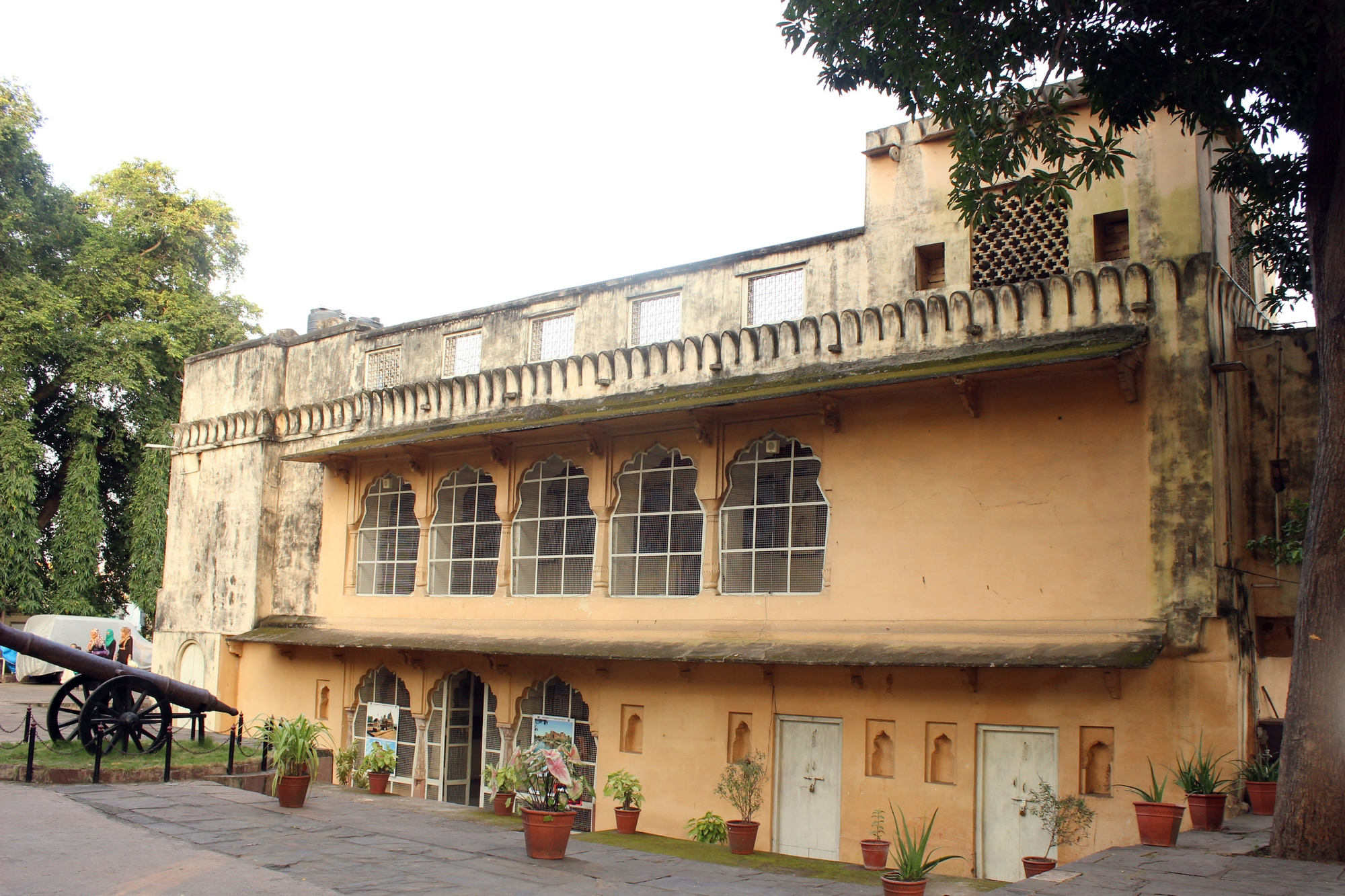
- Interactive map of the Kamlapati palace area

General information
- Location: Bhopal, India
- Coordinates: 23°15′03.4″N 77°23′52.51″E

Kamlapati Palace is located on the bridge, between the larger and the smaller lake of Bhopal. Built in 1722, it is named after Rani Kamlapati the widow of the Gond ruler Nizam Shah, Chief of Ginnorgarh. Rani Kamlapati was one of the seven wives of Ginnor's Gond Warlord Nizam Shah son of Suraj Singh Shah who ruled the territory comprising the merger of 750 villages in the early 18th century. Nizam Shah built a Kamlapati Mahal as a symbol of his love in 1722 which today is being preserved by the Archaeological Survey of India. The palace has been designated as a Monument of National Importance by the Archaeological Survey of India (ASI). Rani Kamlapati tied the rakhi to warlord Dost Muhammad Khan who protected her and her son from her enemies after her husband's death. She gifted Bhopal as a reward to Dost Muhammad Khan who developed it as his capital. Their story shows the Hindu-Muslim unity of Bhopal which continues to the present day. In 2021, the nearby Habibganj railway station in Bhopal was renamed Rani Kamlapati railway station in her honour.

== Location ==
Kamlapati Palace is located inside Kamla Park, Bhopal.

== History ==
Kamlapati Palace lies on the eastern side of the ancient embankment known as Bhojpal, built by the Parmara Rajput King Bhoj (AD 1010–1055) from which the present name Bhopal is derived. The existing structure is a part of the palace which was constructed by Rani Kamlapati, in AD 1722. On the Western side of this palace are the remains of Fatehgarh Fort on the hill which was built by Sardar Dost Mohammad of Bhopal (AD 1708–1726) who laid the foundation of modern Bhopal. This monument was declared protected by the Government of India in 1989 and since then, the Archaeological Survey of India has remained its custodian.

== Architecture ==
Kamlapati palace is an example of contemporary secular architecture of the early eighteenth century and the earliest extant example in the Bhopal Town. This double storied building is constructed of lakhauri bricks having a facade with cusped arches supported on the fluted pillars, merlons having the shape of lotus petals and brackets supporting the Chhajjas.

== Gallery ==
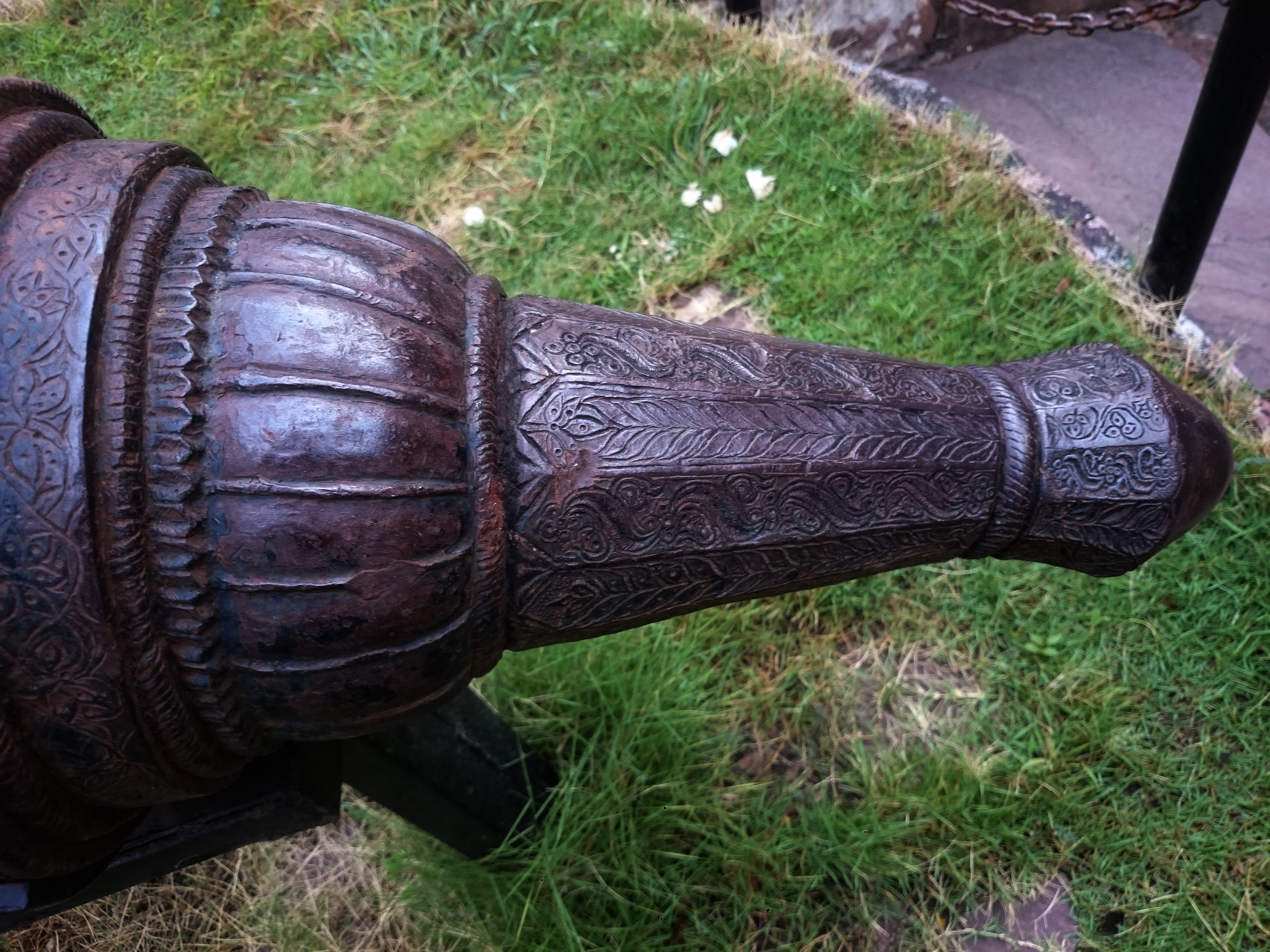

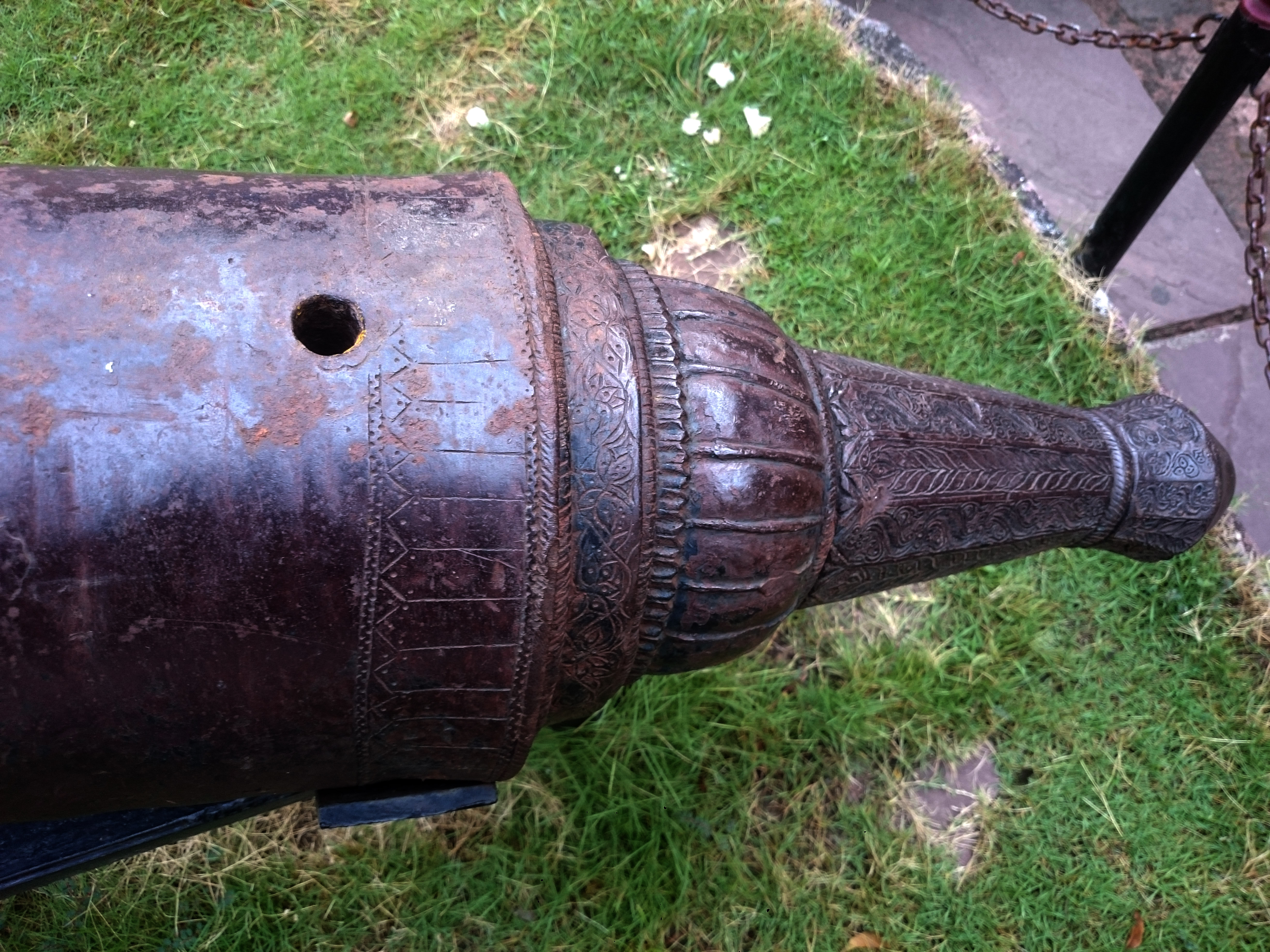

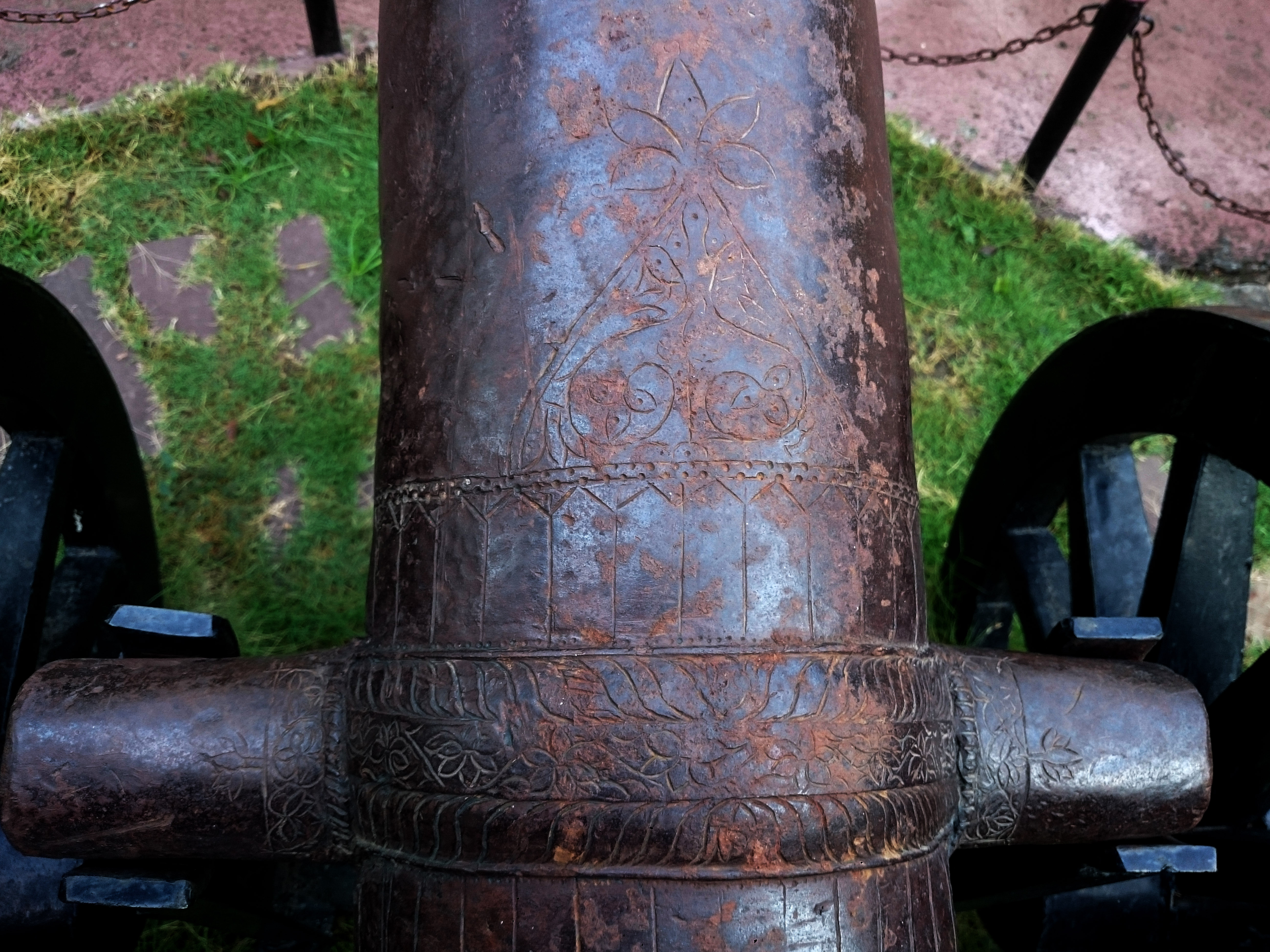

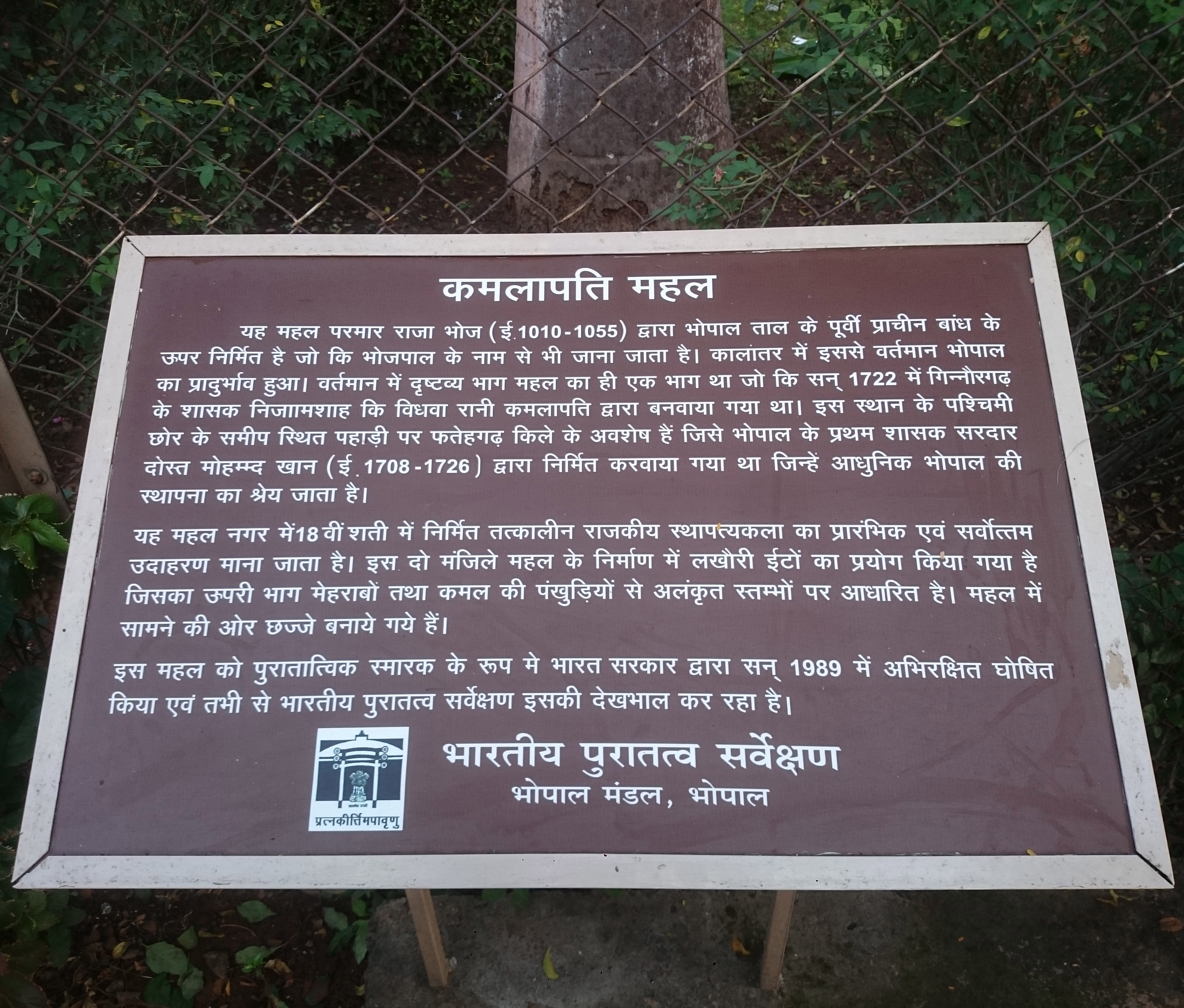

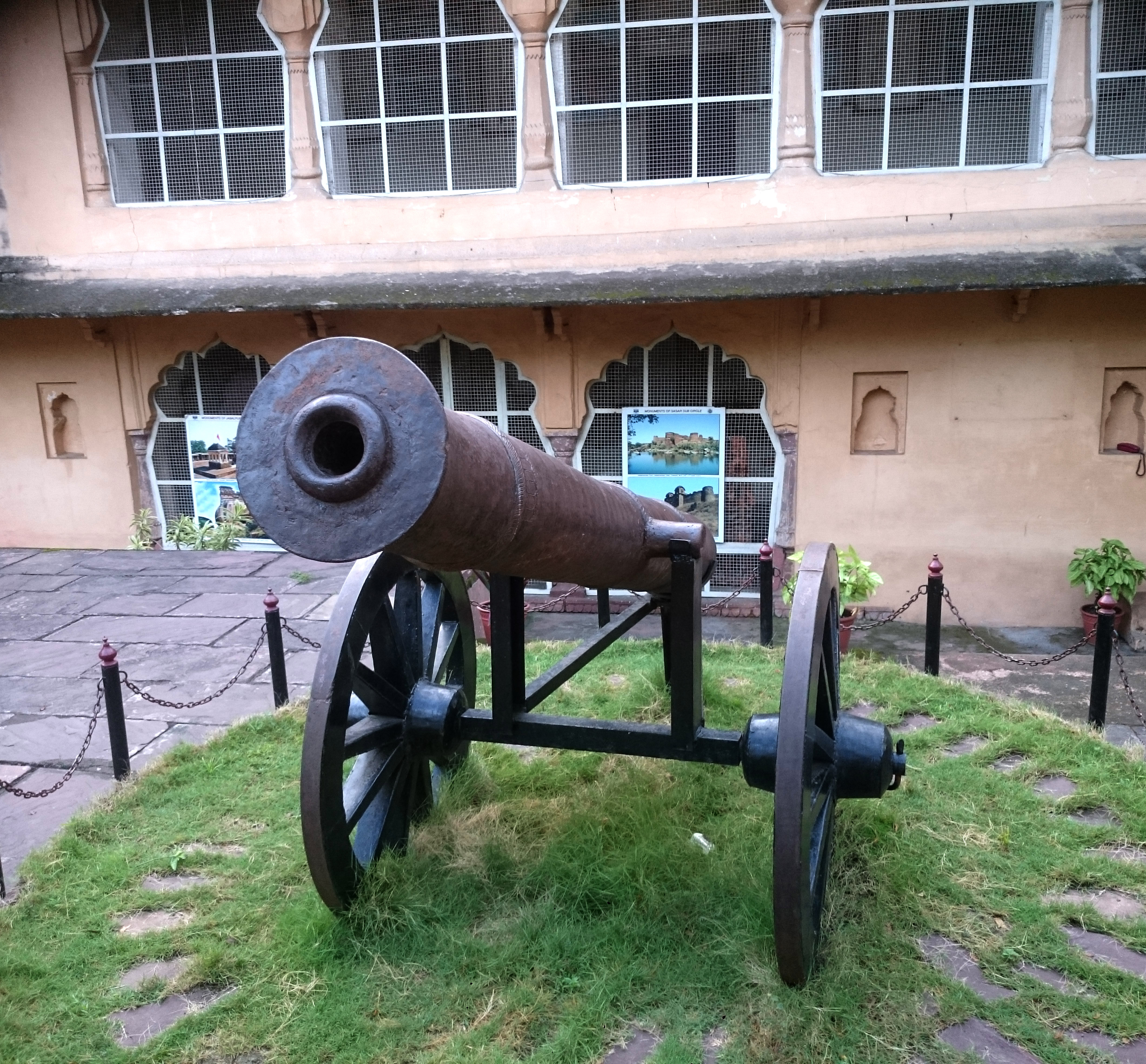
Canon at Kamlapati Palace

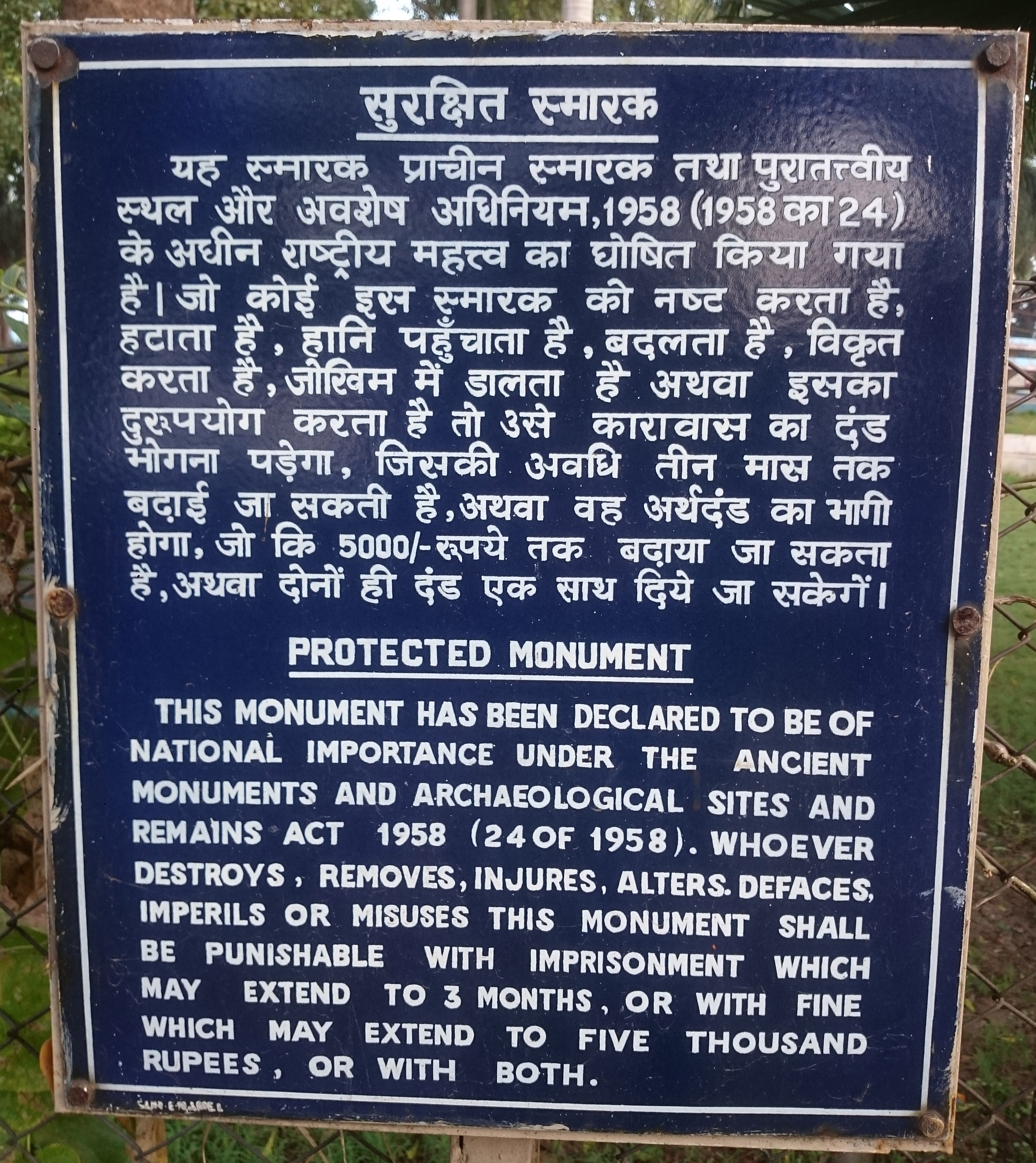

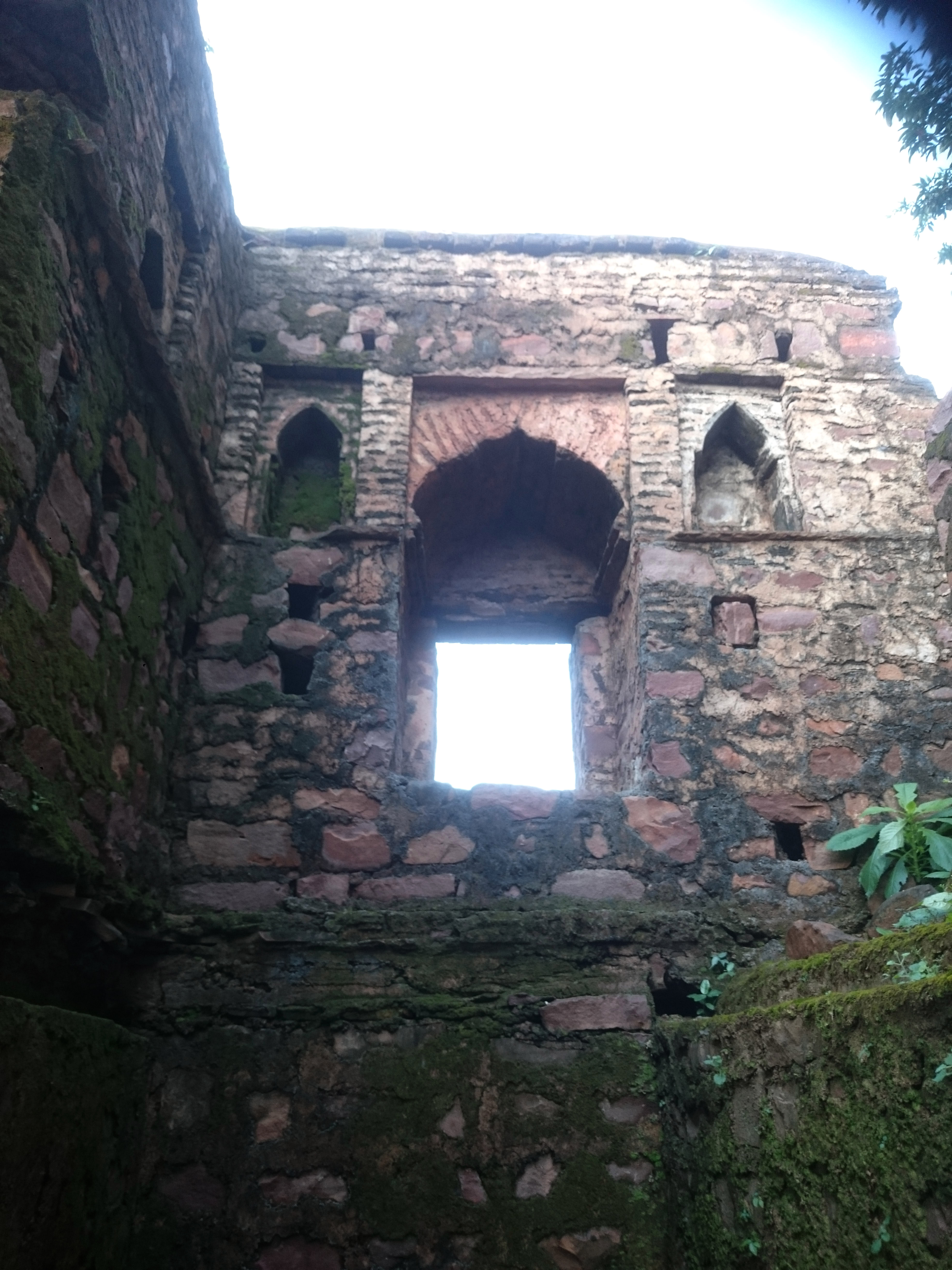

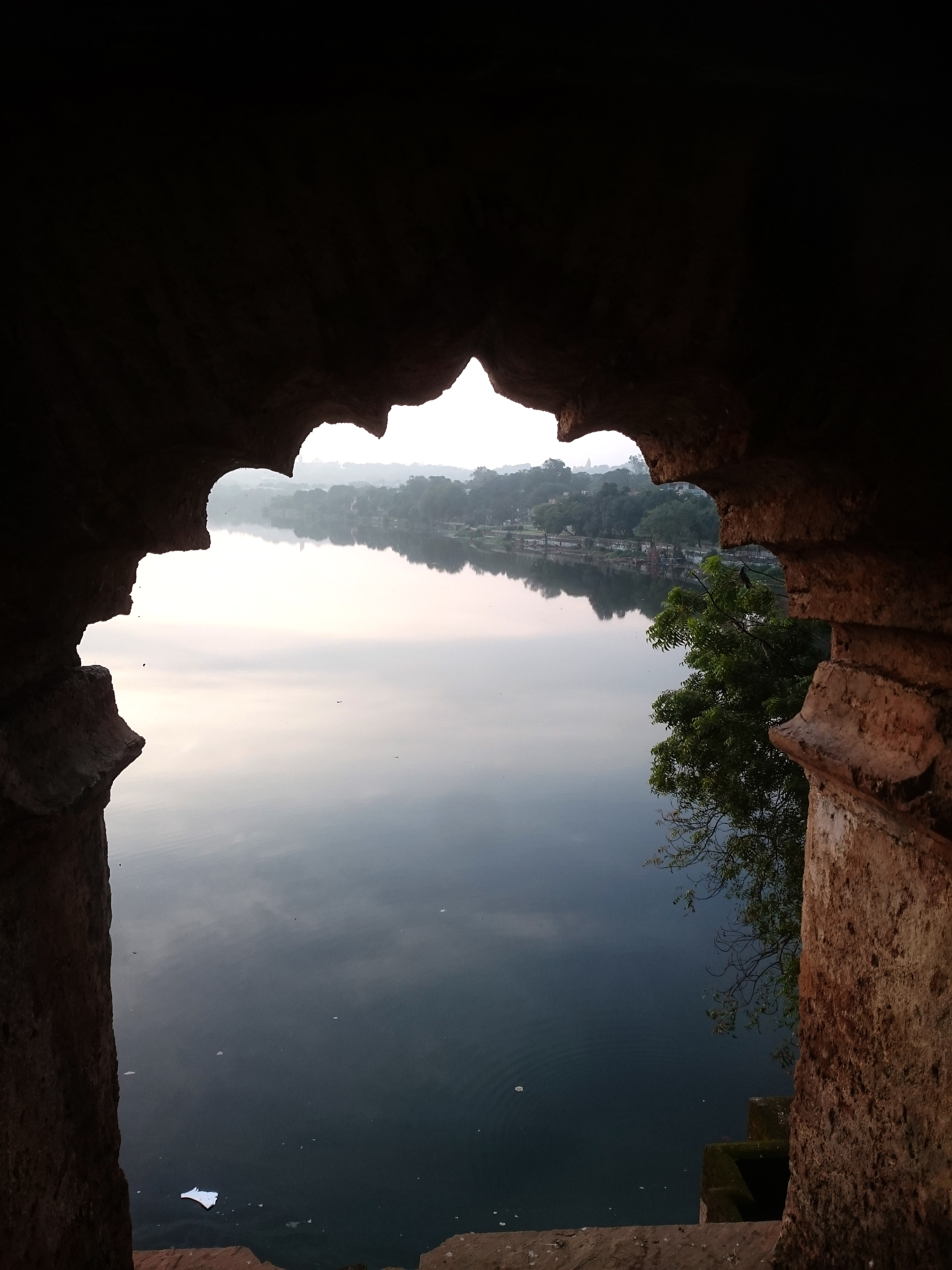

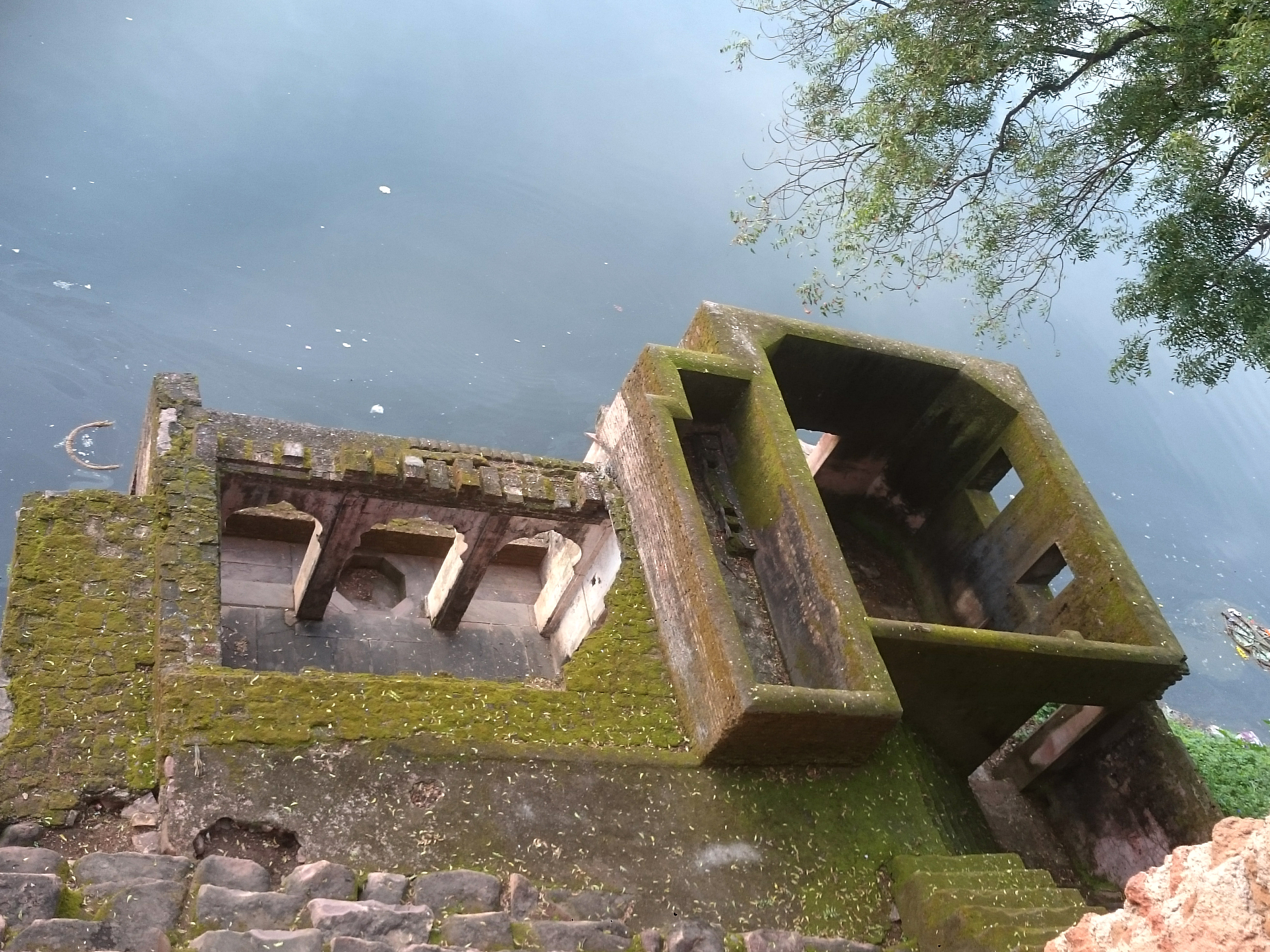

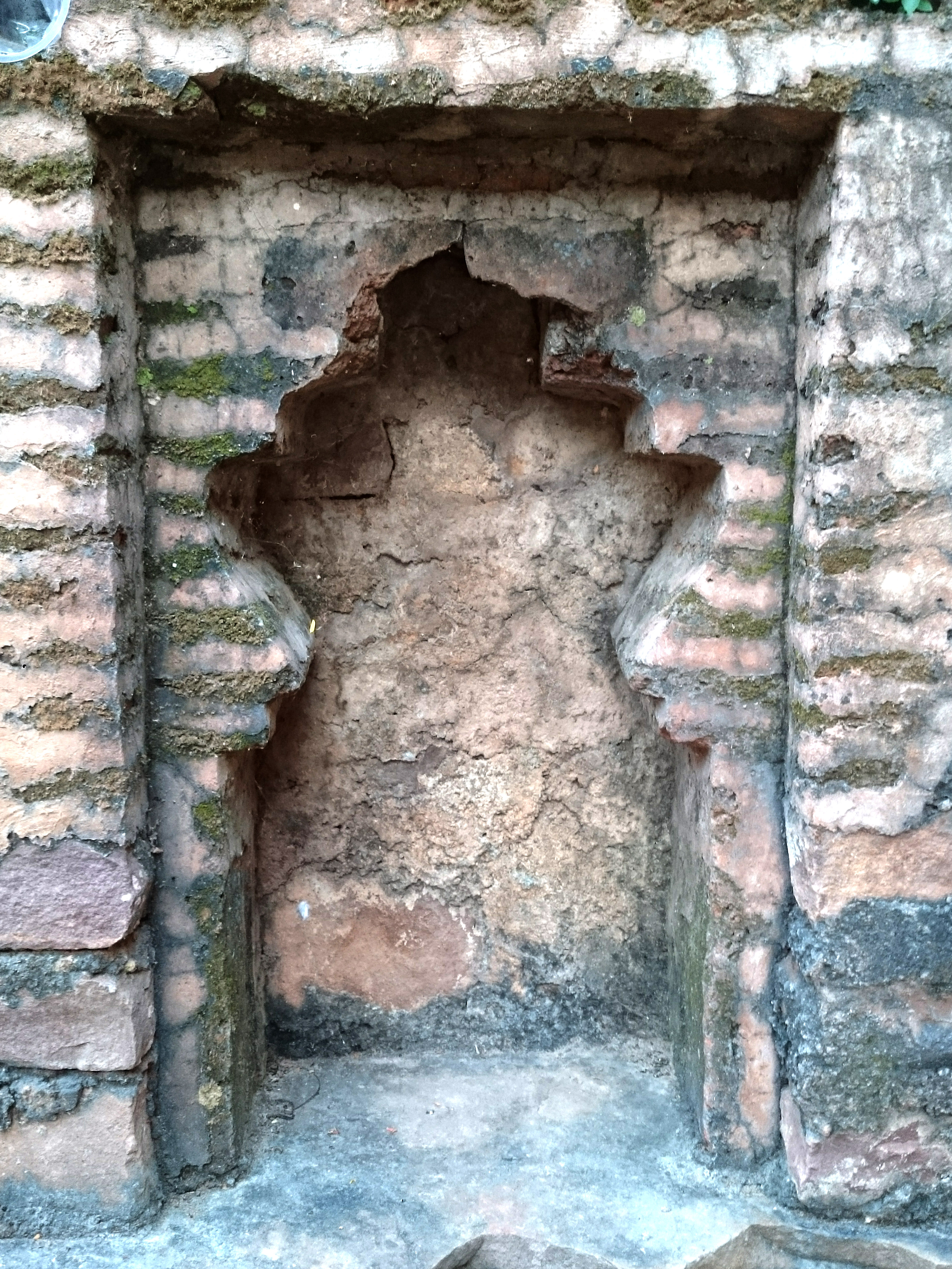

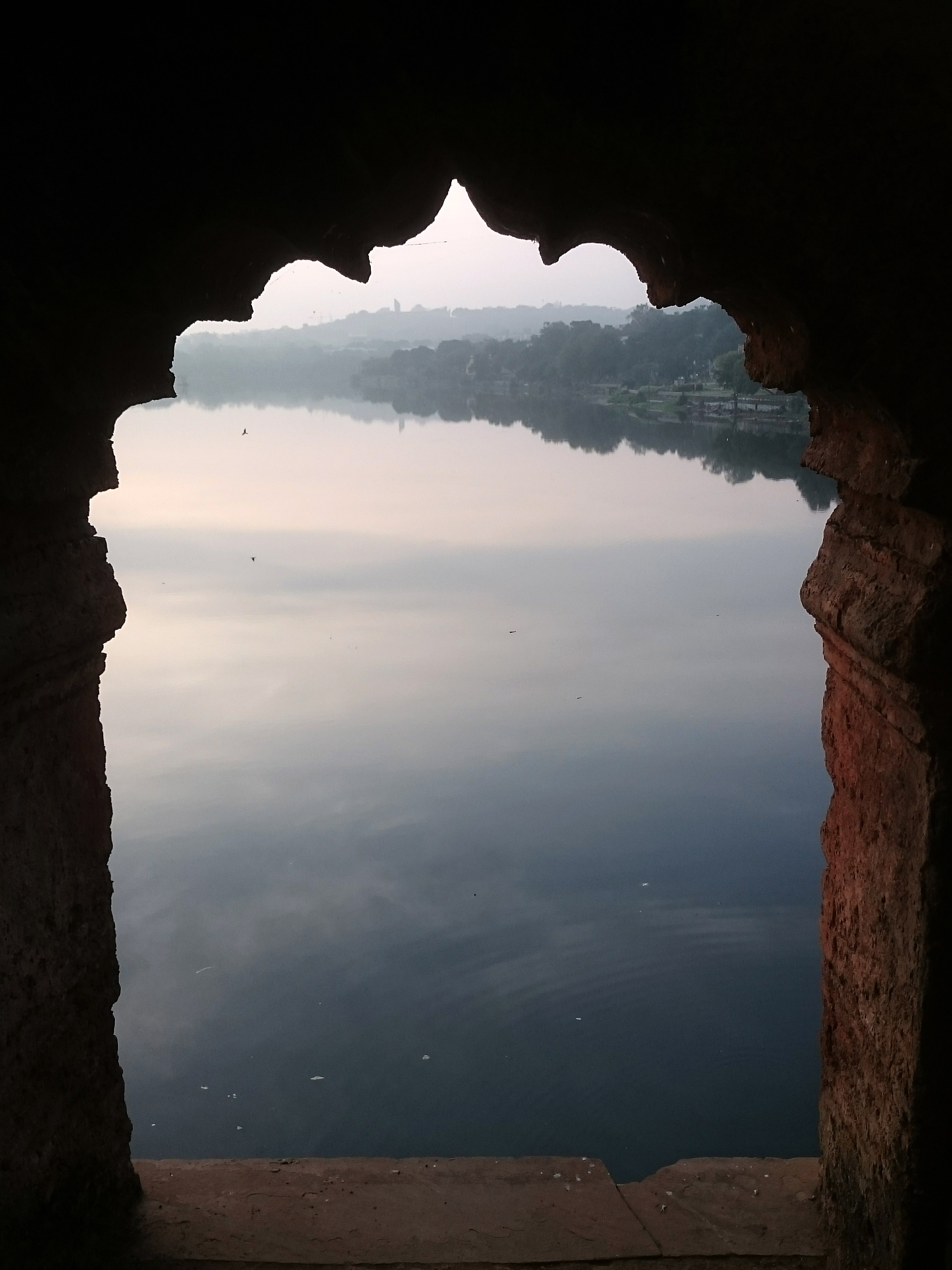

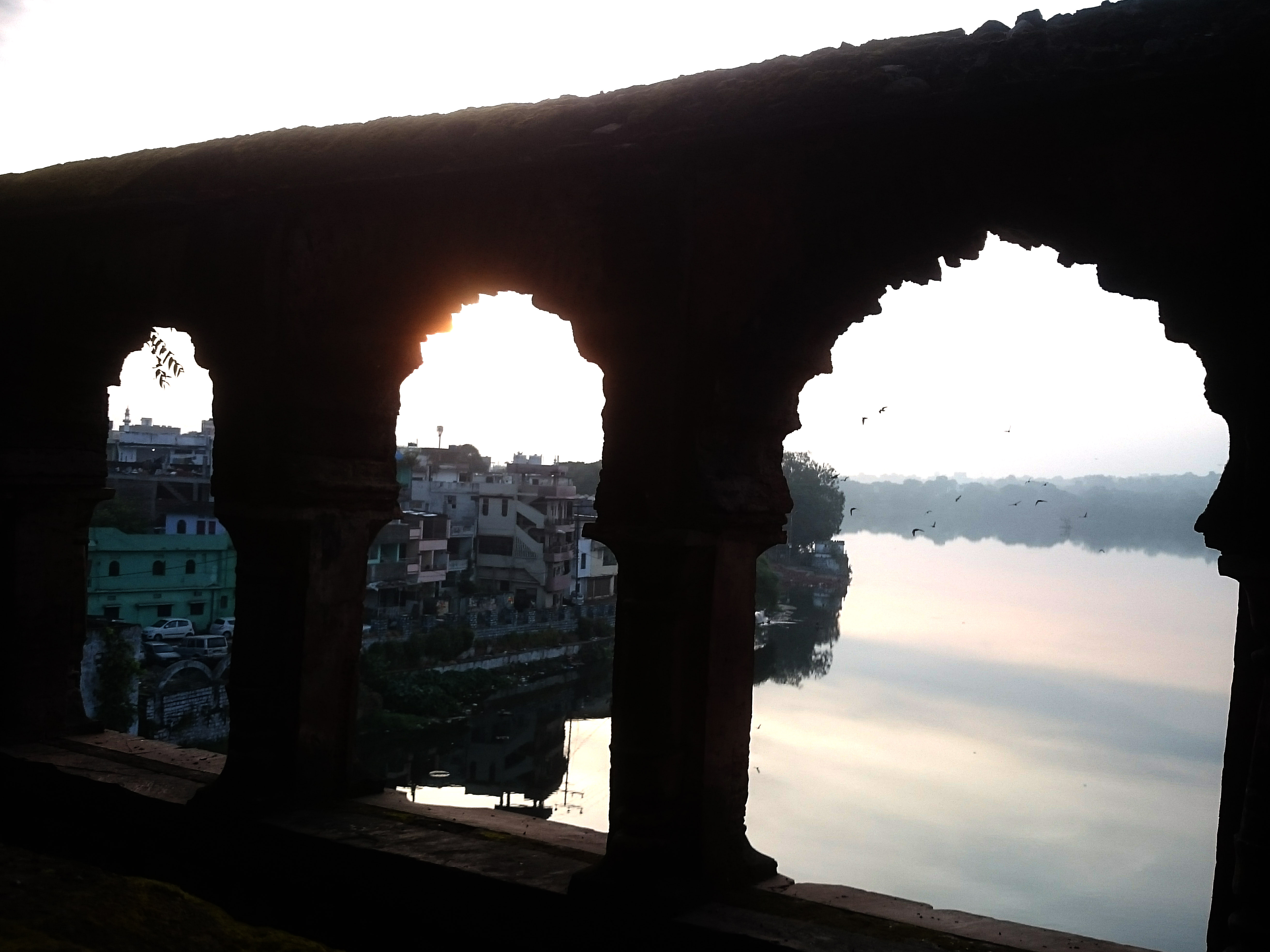

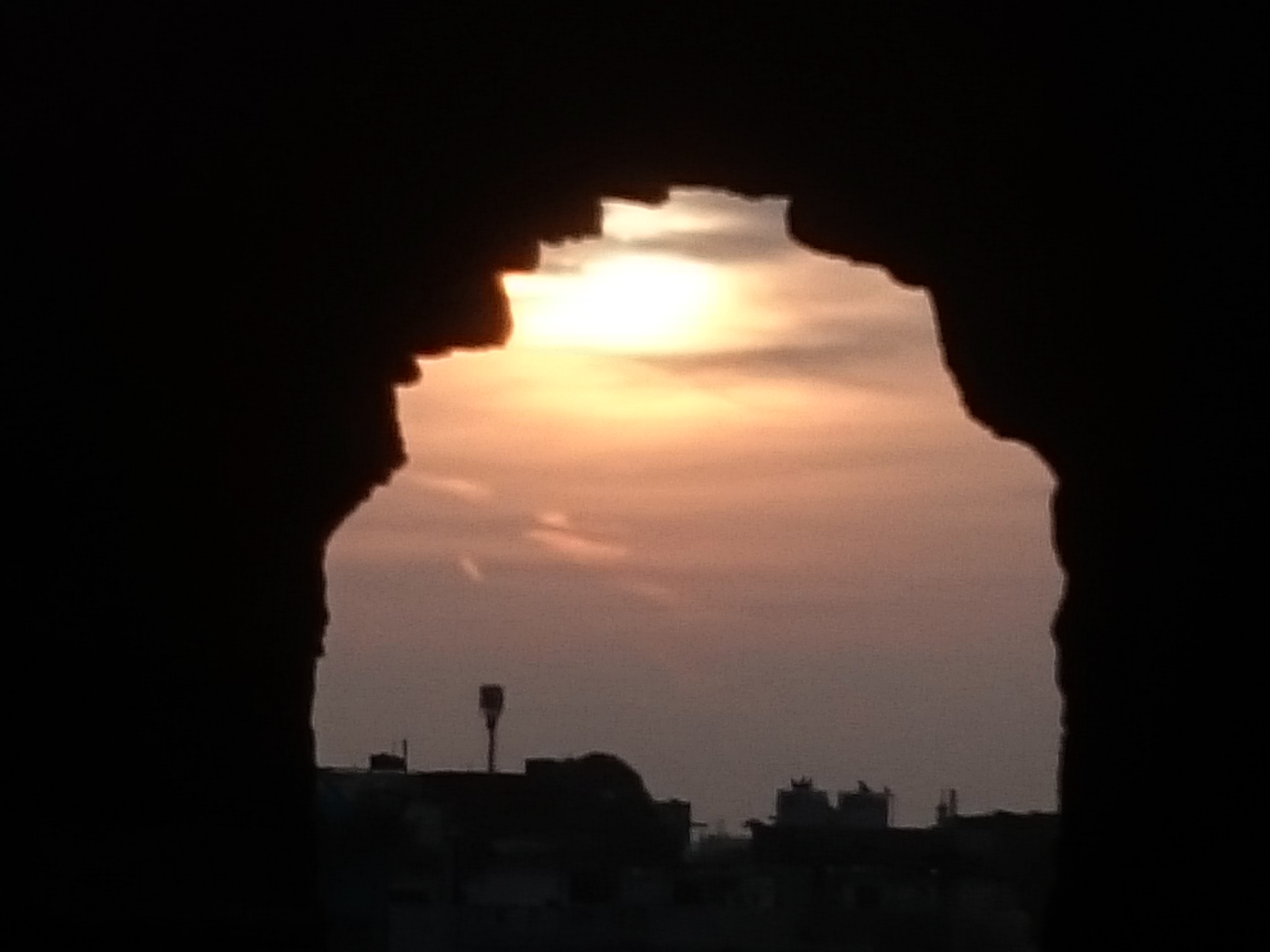

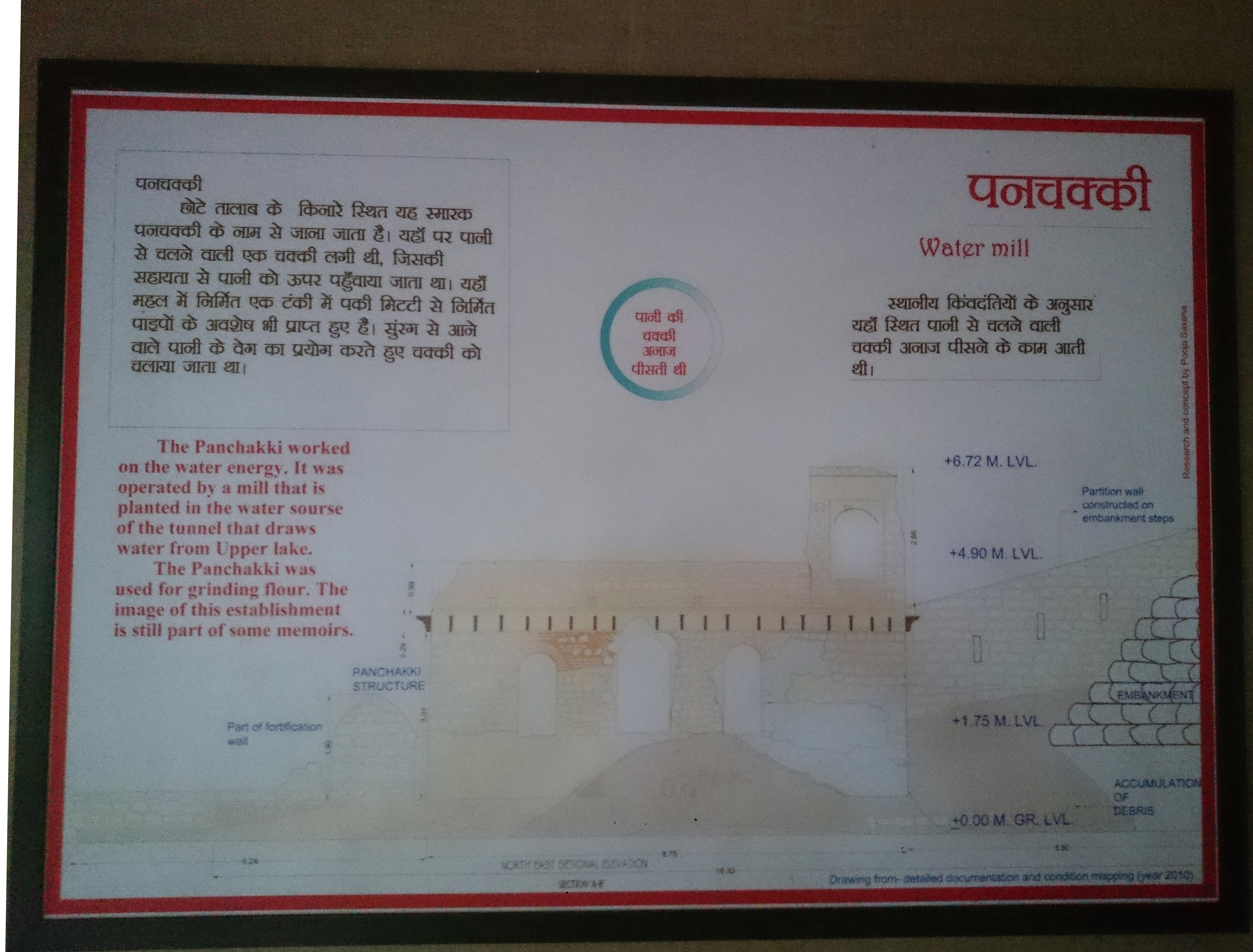

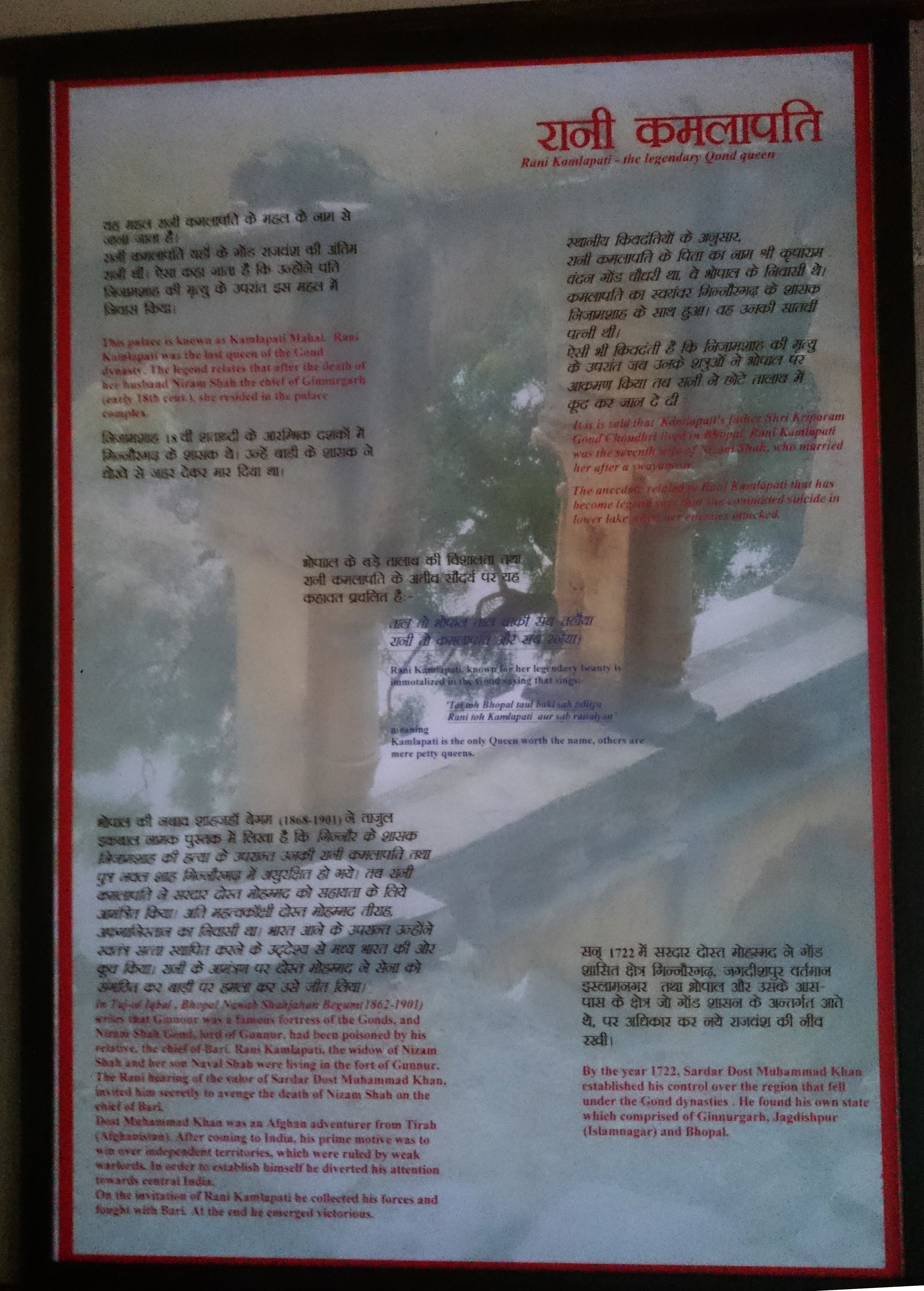

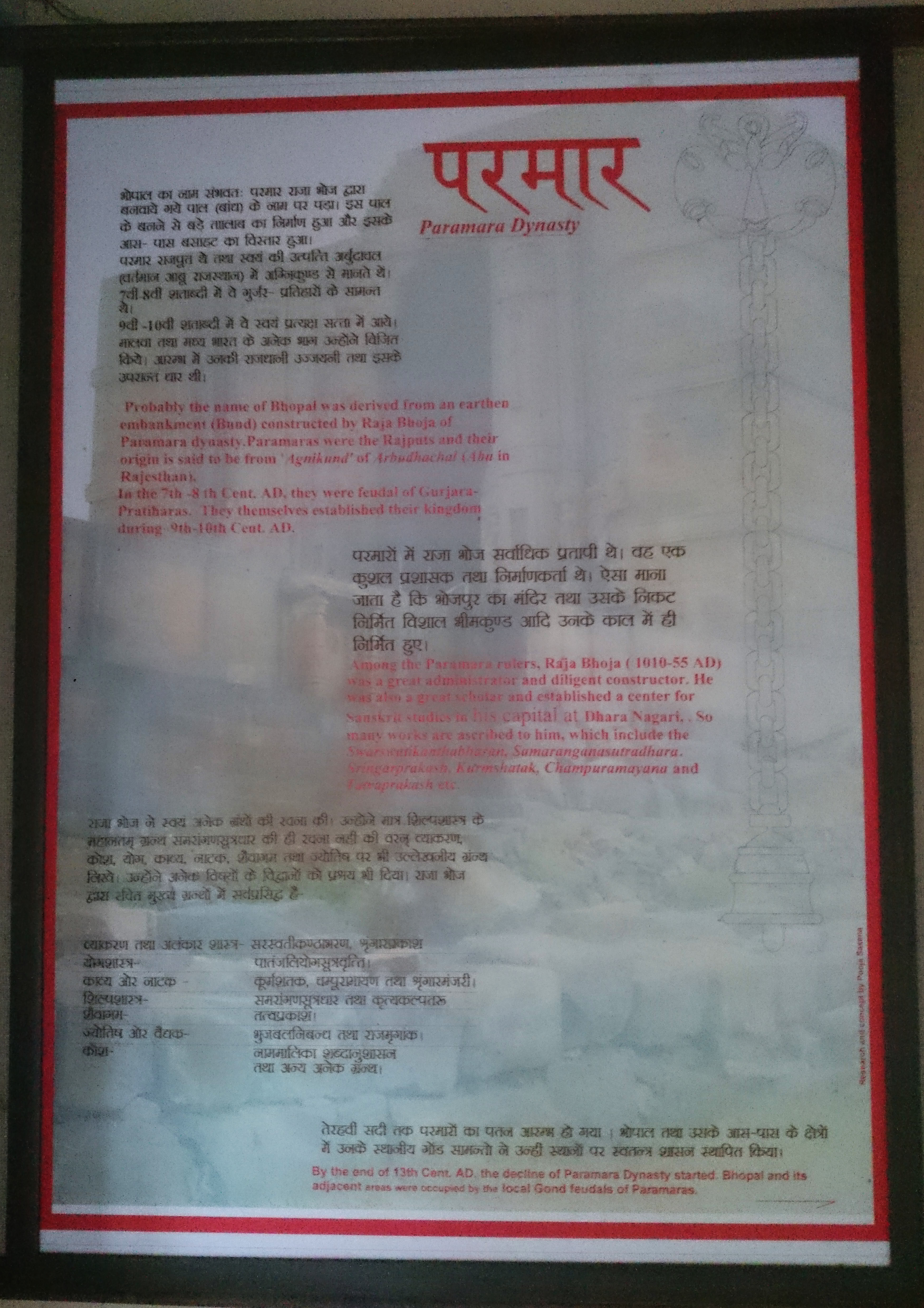

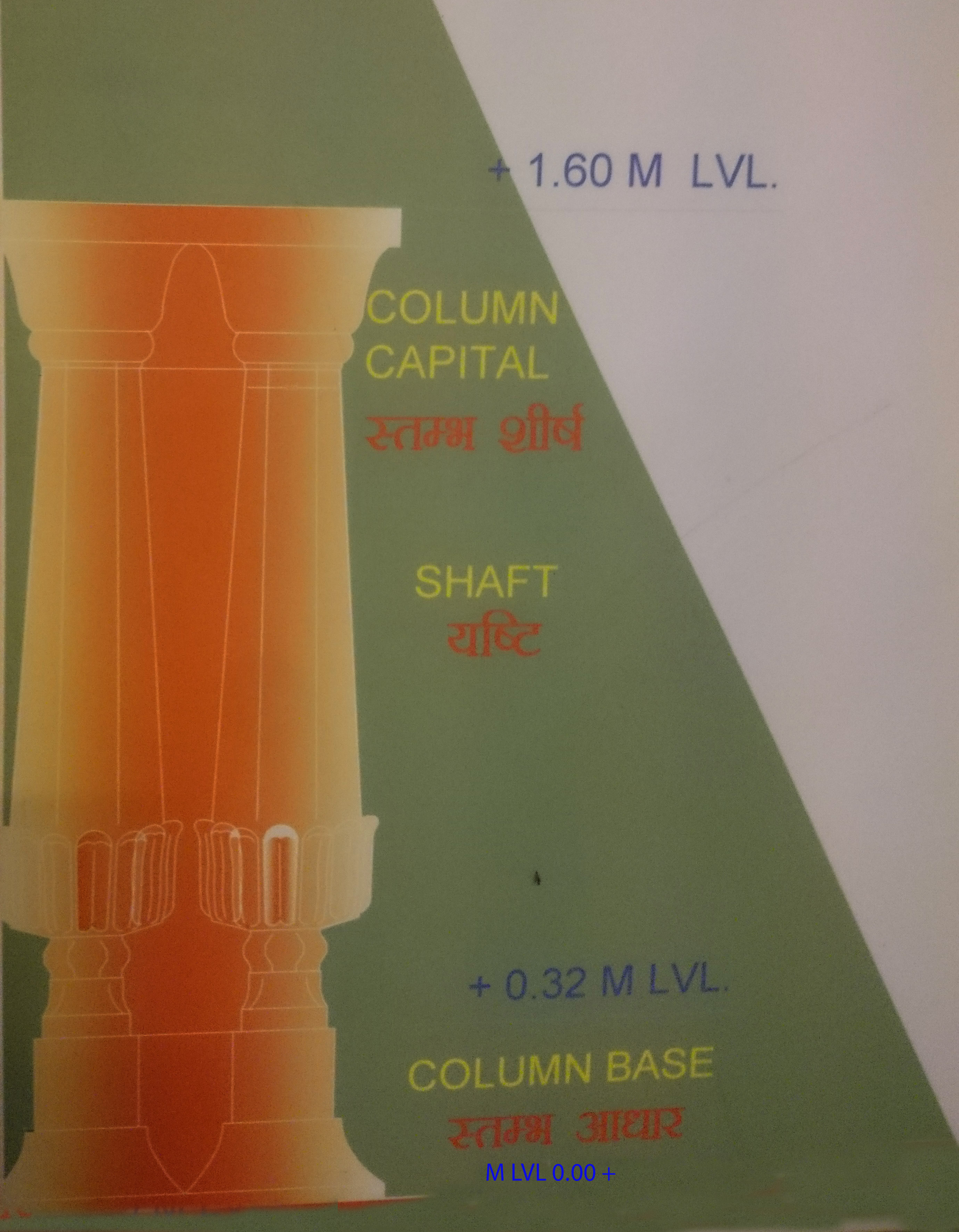

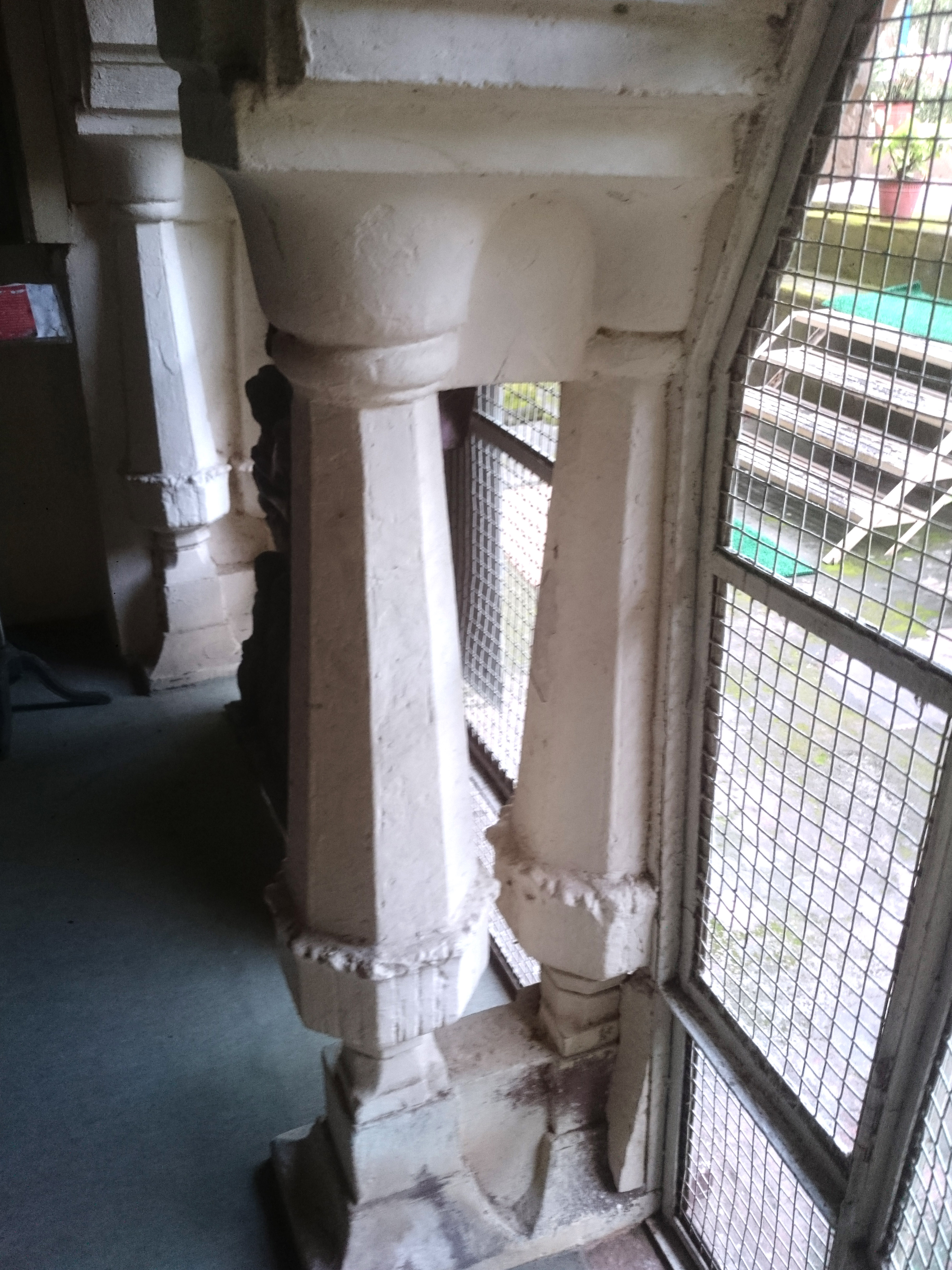

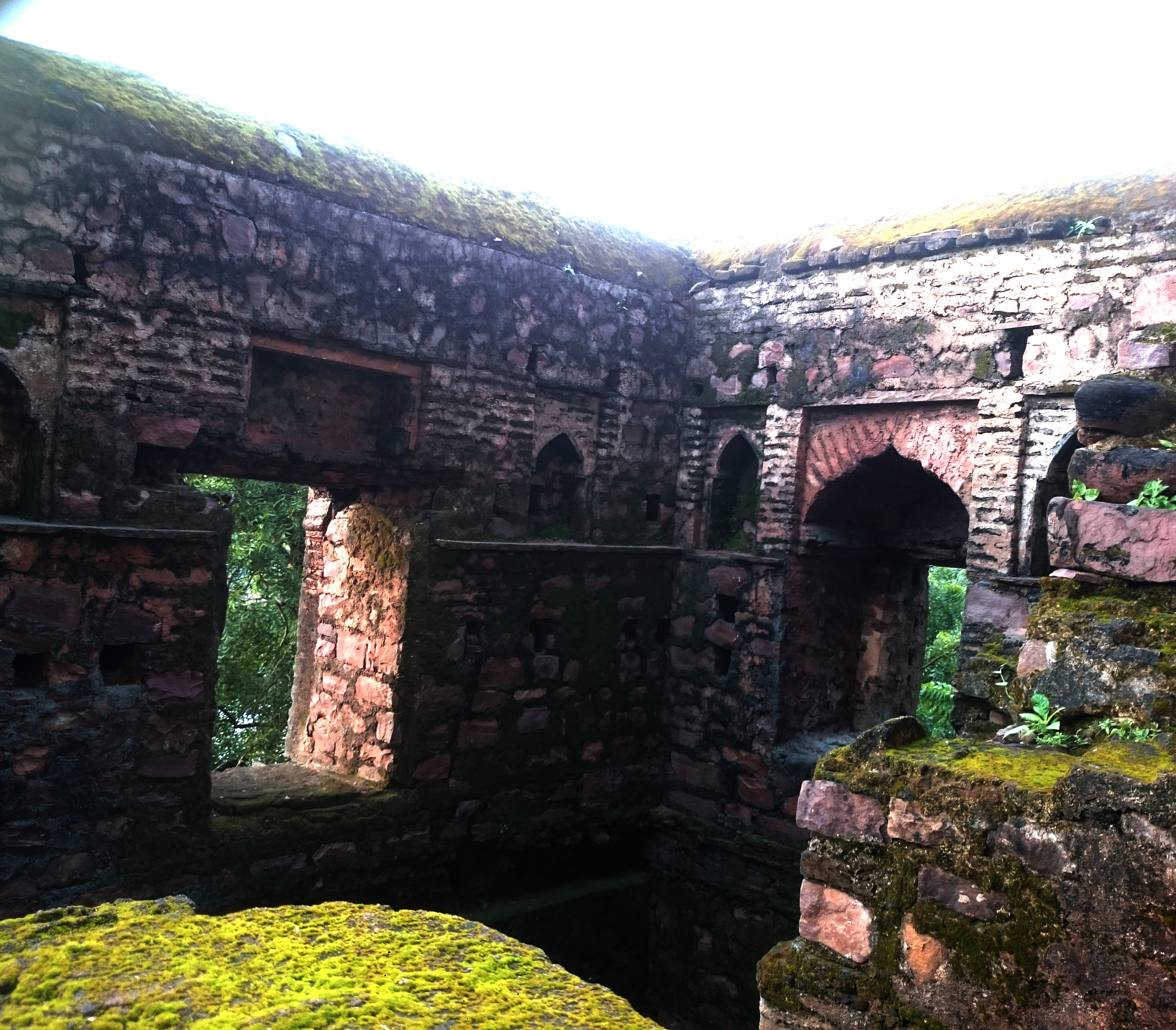

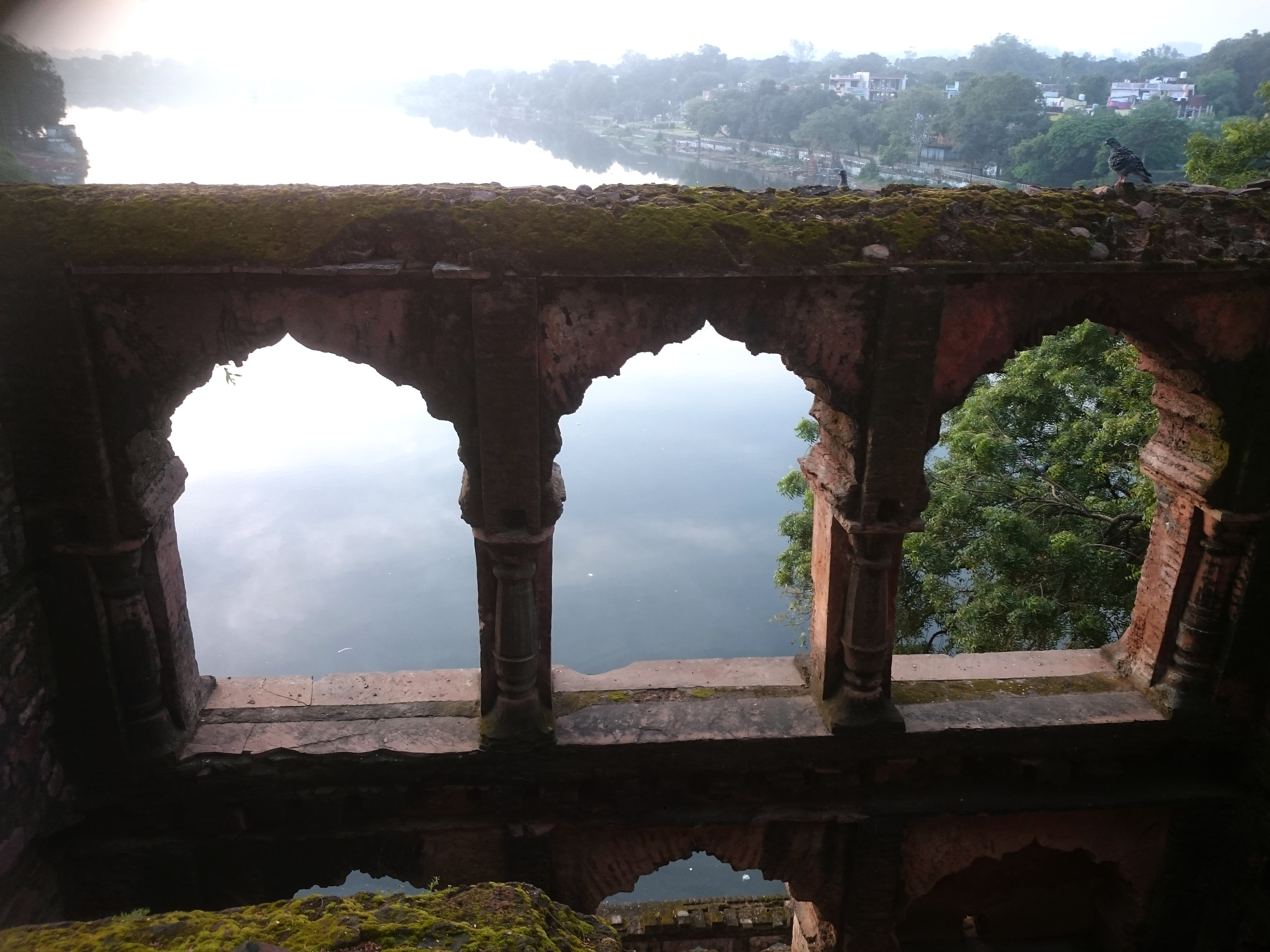

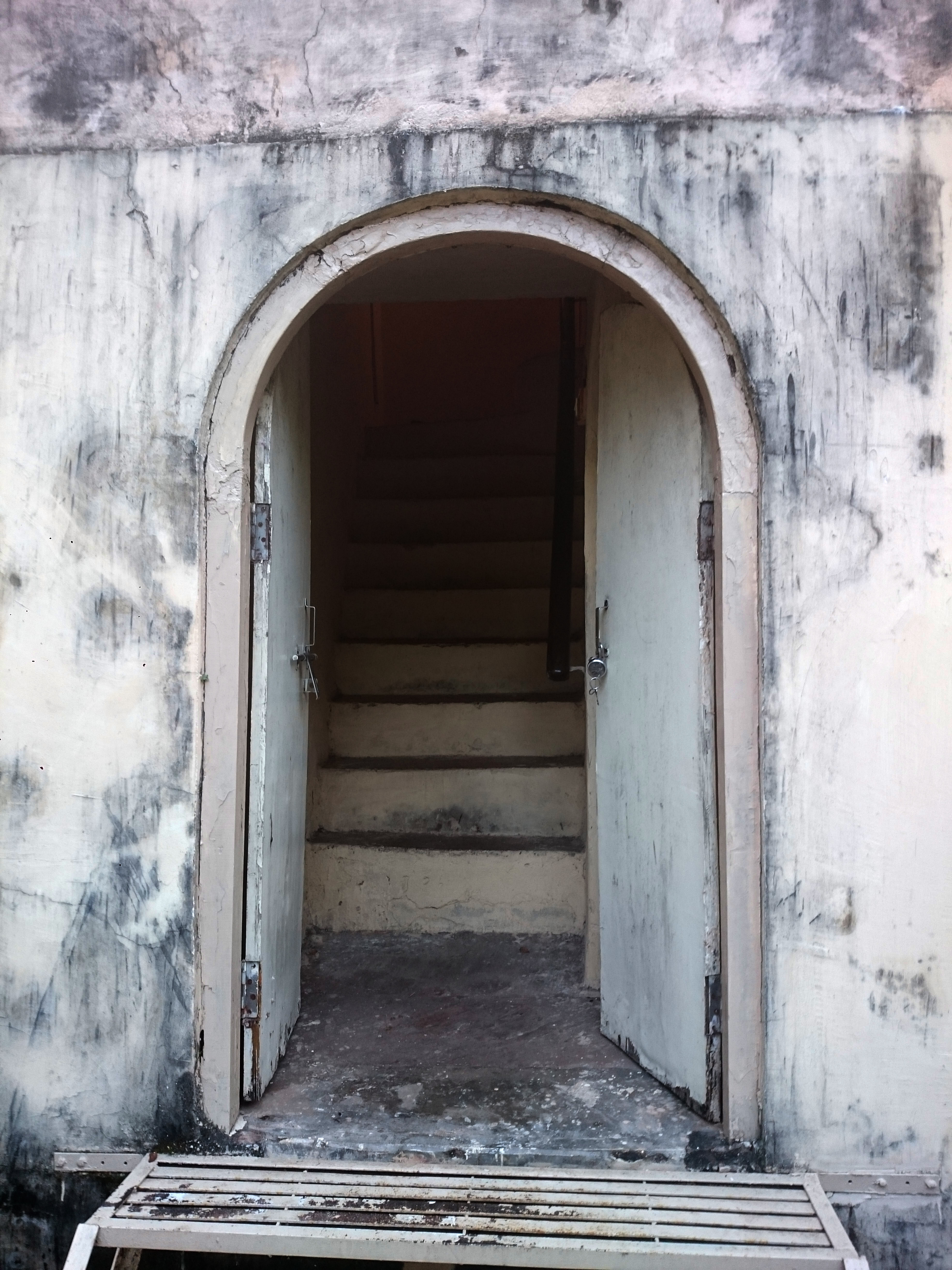

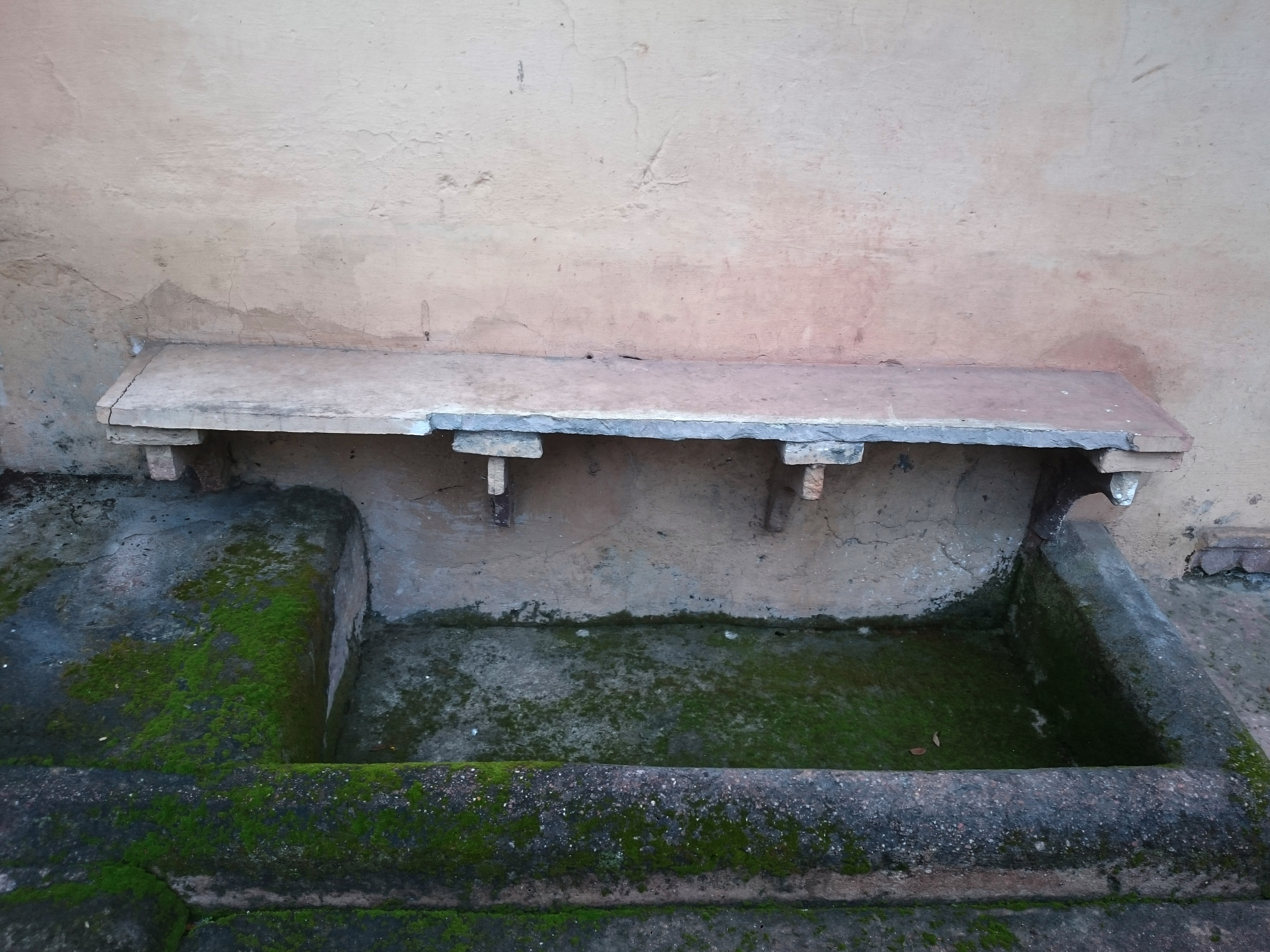

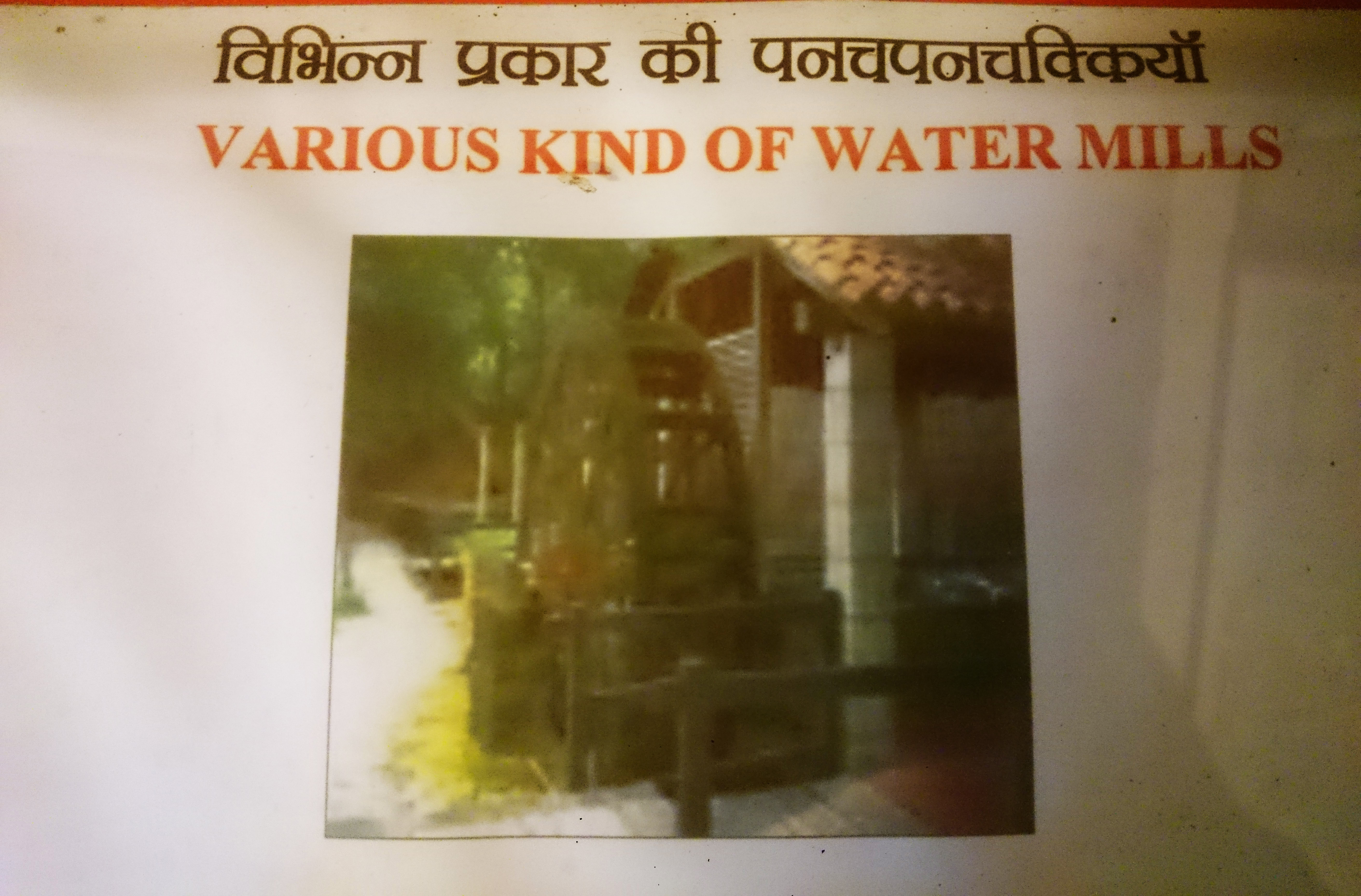

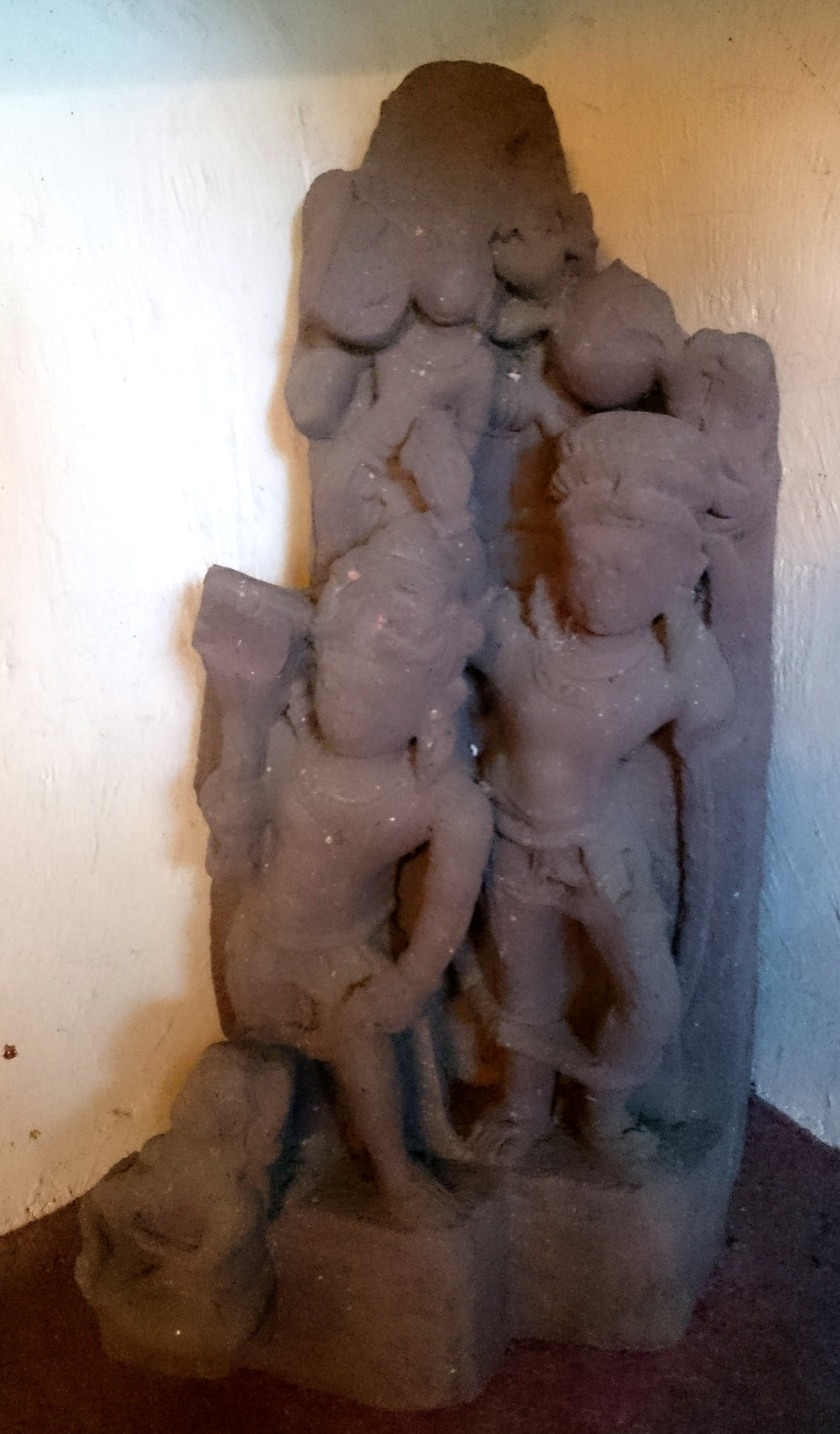

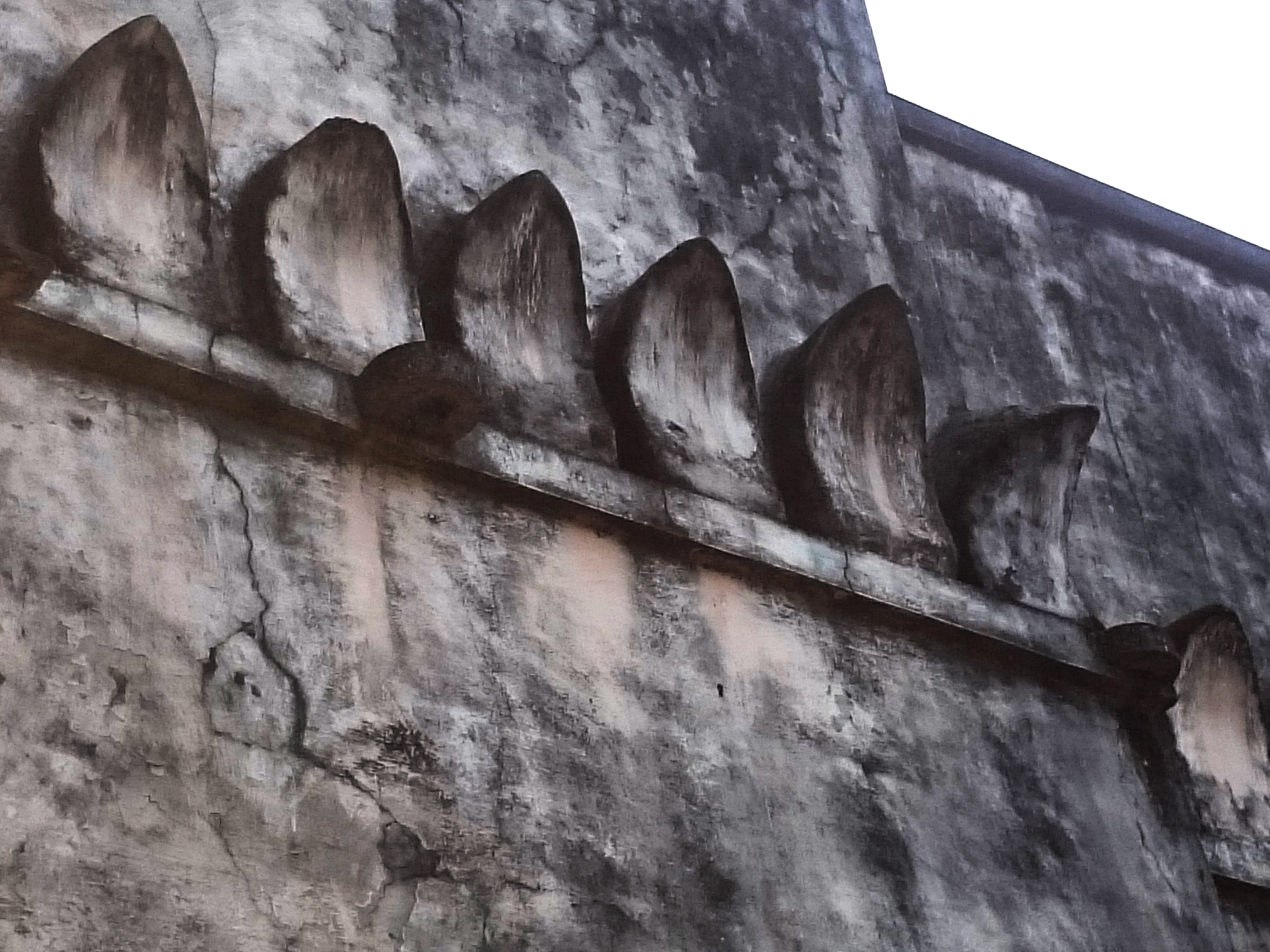

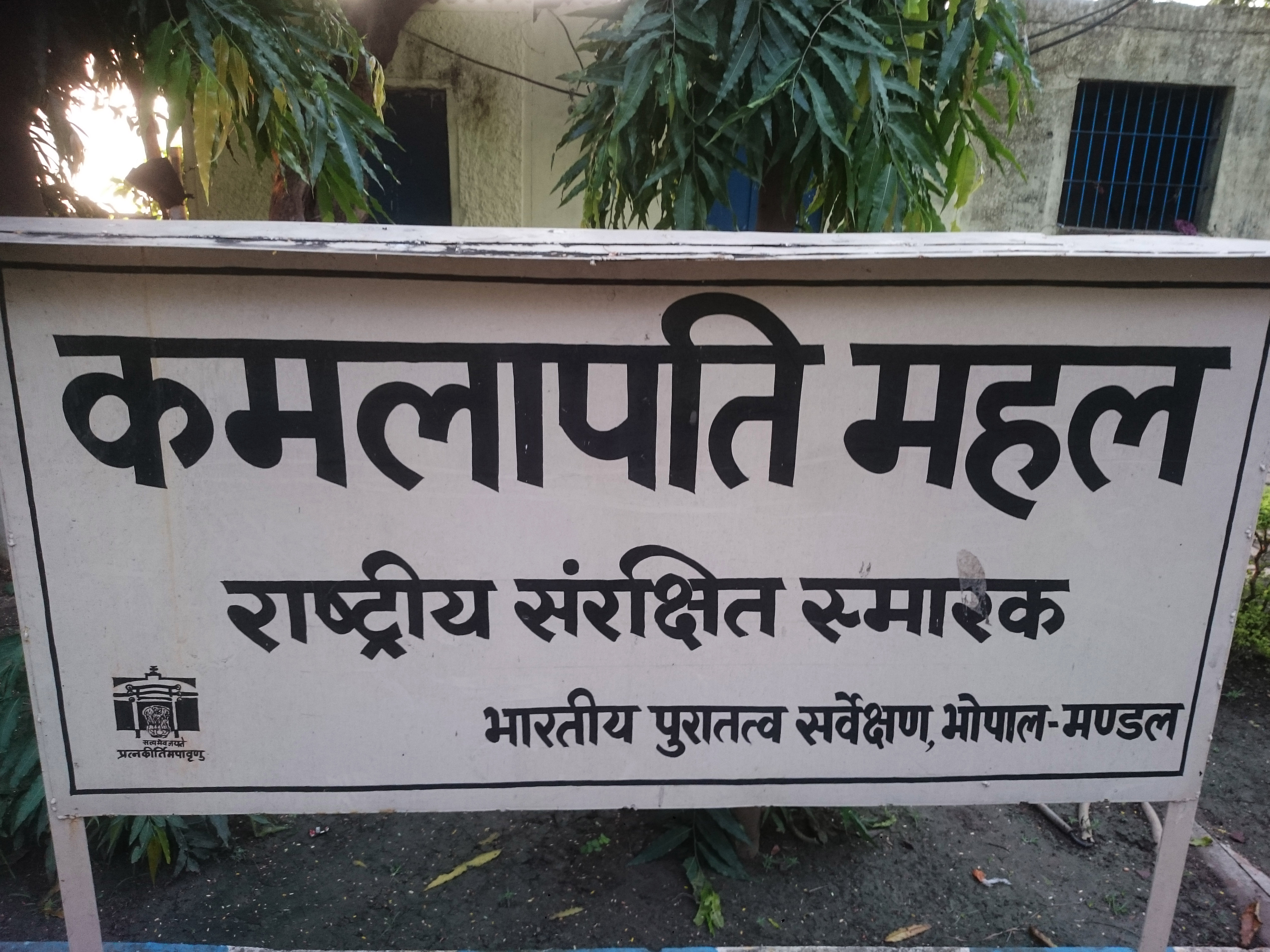
