= Tomb of Shah Nawaz Khan =

Coordinates: 21°19′42″N 76°14′35″E

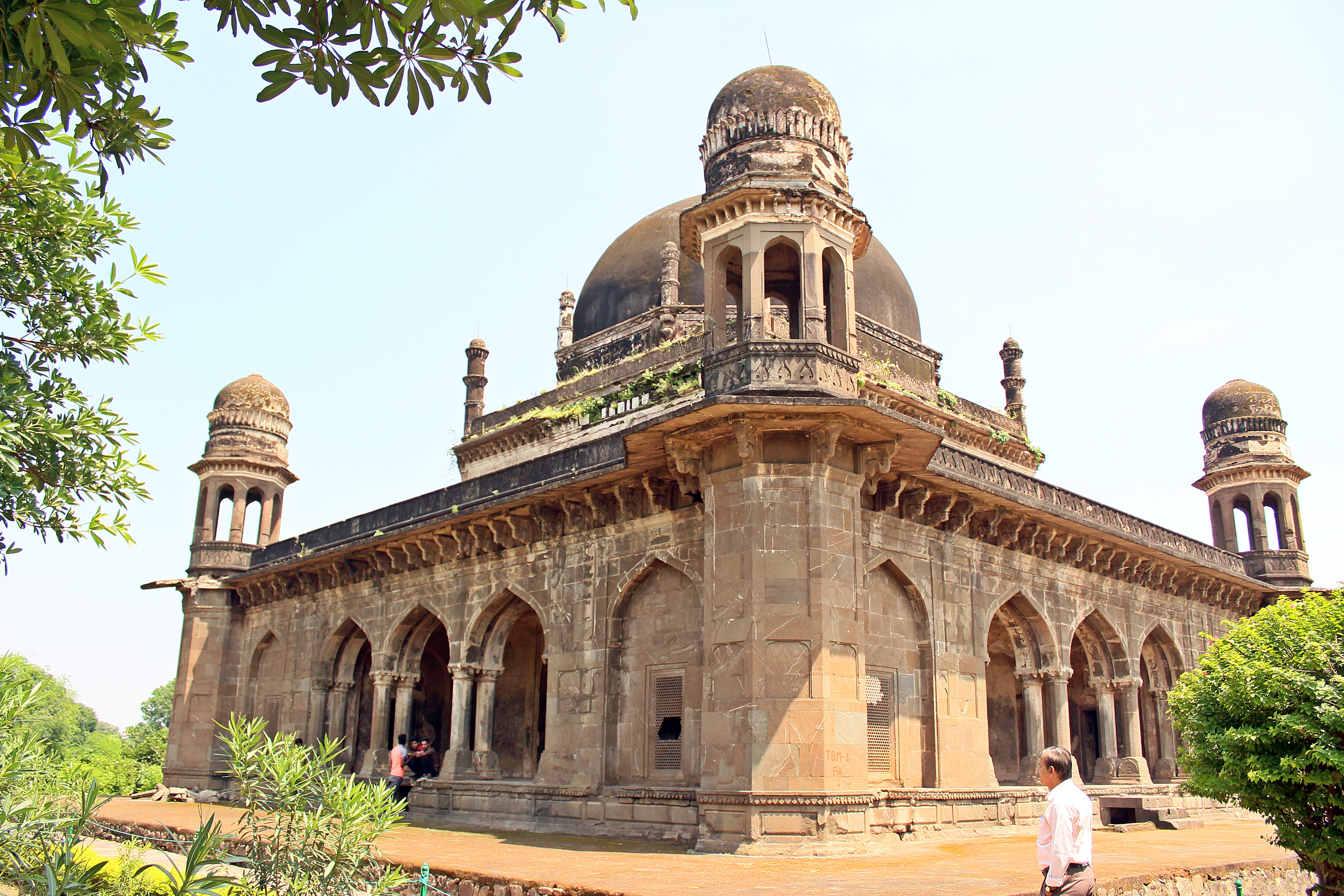

General information
- Location: Burhanpur
- Country: India

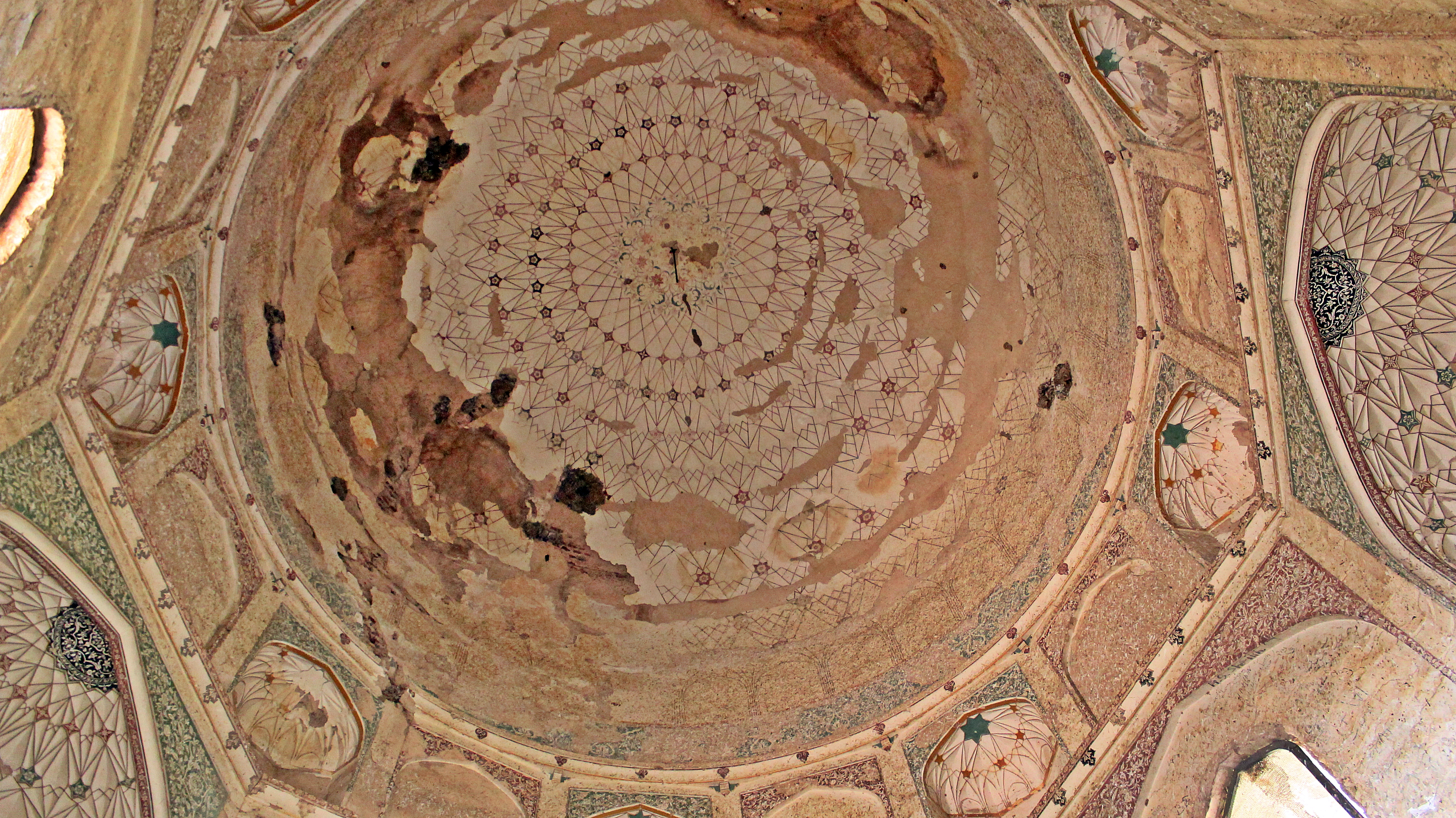
Interior of the dome decorated with Islamic geometric patterns

The Tomb of Shah Nawaz Khan is a 17th-century Mughal tomb in Burhanpur, in the Indian state of Madhya Pradesh. It is listed as a monument of national importance. The tomb is also nicknamed the "Black Taj Mahal" owing to the black stone used in its construction.

== History ==
The tomb was built by Mughal nobleman Abdul Rahim Khan-i-Khanan, for his son Shah Nawaz Khan, who died around 1618-1620. The monument dates to Khan-i-Khanan's nine-year tenure in Burhanpur as the Mughal subahdar (governor) of the Deccan, and is one of several constructions he carried out in the city. Michell and Zebrowski date the monument to 1619.

== Architecture ==
The tomb is a two-storied square structure with hexagonal minarets on all four corners. The tomb borrows elements from the Imperial style of the Delhi Sultanate, as well as the provincial style of the Deccan and Gujarat. It is located in the midst of a garden.
