= Supedi =

- Village
- Location in Gujarat, India
- Coordinates: 21.762°N 70.378°E
- Country: India
- State: Gujarat
- District: Rajkot

Languages
  - Official: Gujarati, Hindi, English
- Time zone: UTC+5:30 (IST)
- PIN: 360 440
- Telephone code: 2824
- Vehicle registration: GJ 3

Supedi is a village located in the district of Rajkot in the Indian state of Gujarat. Its population is about 6946 persons, living in around 1750 households.

Supedi is located about 9 km from Dhoraji and 10 km from Upleta on the banks of the Utavali River. Its high fort wall, small ghats and temples are major attractions.

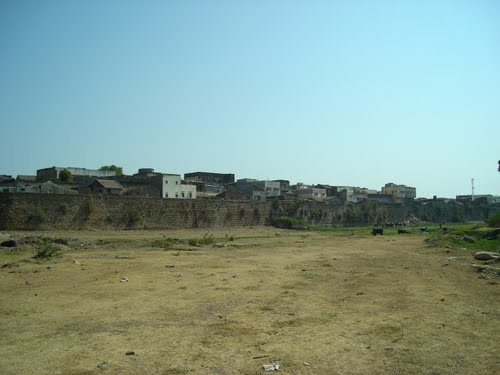
Supedi Village from Utavali River

== Transport ==
=== Air ===
Rajkot and Porbandar are the nearest airports.

=== Road ===
Supedi is on National Highway 8B. It connects Supedi with Rajkot, Porbandar, Jamnagar, Gondal and Jetpur. State transport corporation and private bus operators provide bus services.

=== Railway ===
Supedi railway station lies on the Wansjaliya-Jetalsar railway line that connects with Rajkot, the nearest large city. Wansjaliya railway junction is west of Supedi and connects with Porbandar, Jamnagar. Dhoraji railway station and Jetalsar railway junction are east of Supedi and connect with Rajkot. The railway line was metre gauge like all other tracks in Saurashtra and converted to broad gauge in 2011.

== Education ==
- Shree Taluka Shala Supedi - for primary education
- Shree kanya vidyalaya - for girls' primary education
- Smt. L. N. Govani primary school
- Smt. R. D. Govani High School
- Shri J. H. Govani Kanya Vidyalaya
- Eva college of Ayurved
