= Bibi Ki Masjid =

Mosque in Burhanpur, Madhya Pradesh, India

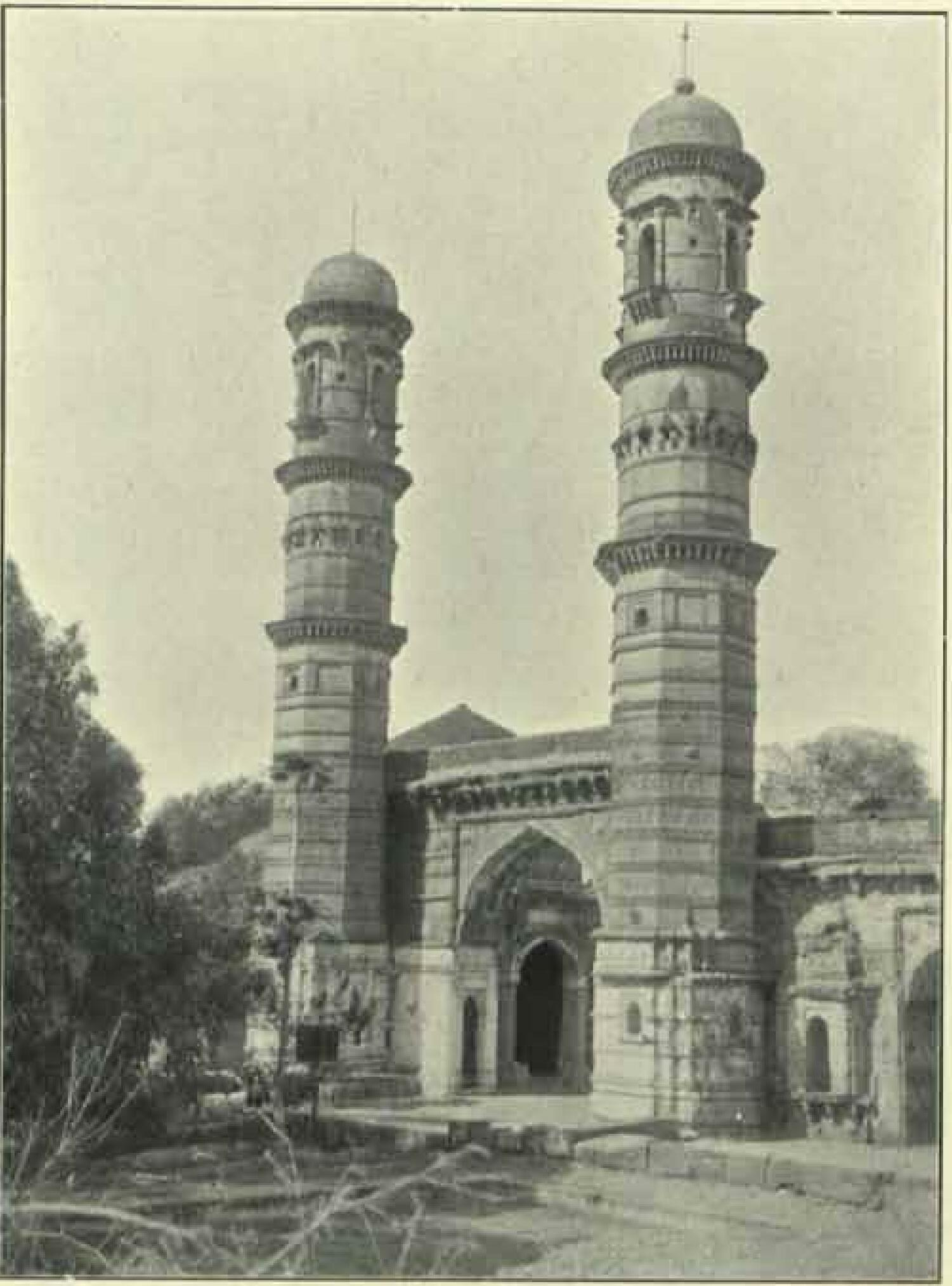
- The mosque in c. 1915, with both minarets, photographed by the ASI

- Location of the mosque in Madhya Pradesh

Religion
- Affiliation: Islam (former)
- Ecclesiastical or organizational status: Mosque
- Status: Inactive (partial ruinous state)

Location
- Location: Burhanpur, Burhanpur District, Madhya Pradesh
- Country: India
- Interactive map of Bibi Ki Masjid
- Administration: Archaeological Survey of India
- Coordinates: 21°18′57″N 76°14′13″E

Architecture
- Type: Mosque architecture
- Style: Indo-Islamic
- Completed: 16th century

Specifications
- Domes: Three (One remains)
- Minarets: Two (One remains standing)
- Materials: Stone; brick

Monument of National Importance

Bibi Ki Masjid (lit. Mosque of the lady), also known as Bibi Saheba Masjid, is a mosque in Burhanpur, in the state of Madhya Pradesh, India. The building is a Monument of National Importance, administered by the Archaeological Survey of India (ASI).

== History ==
The mosque was built in the 16th century during the reign of the Faruqi dynasty, around the same time as the Jama Masjid, Burhanpur. It was probably commissioned by a queen of Adil Khan Faruqi III, Begum Rokeya, who was a daughter of the Sultan of Gujarat, Muzaffar Shah III.

Parts of the mosque wall collapsed due to heavy rain in 2016.

== Description ==
The style of architecture is similar to that of the Gujarat Sultanate, specifically to the Jama Masjid at Champaner.

The mosque facade is of the closed variety, and consists of a large arched entrance, flanked by two minarets. The minarets are five-storied, with the lower two stories built of stone, and the upper three built of brick. The upper portions of the minarets are adorned by oriel windows, and they are topped with a cupola. One of the minarets has collapsed entirely.

The mosque is rectangular in plan. The mosque used to have three large domes, of which only one survives. Apart from this, a number of cupolas are present on the roof.

The mosque has two Persian inscriptions on the pillars, as well as an Arabic inscription over the gate.

== See also ==
- Islam in India
- List of mosques in India
- List of Monuments of National Importance in Madhya Pradesh
