= Burhanpur =

City in Madhya Pradesh, India

Burhanpur Brampore
- City
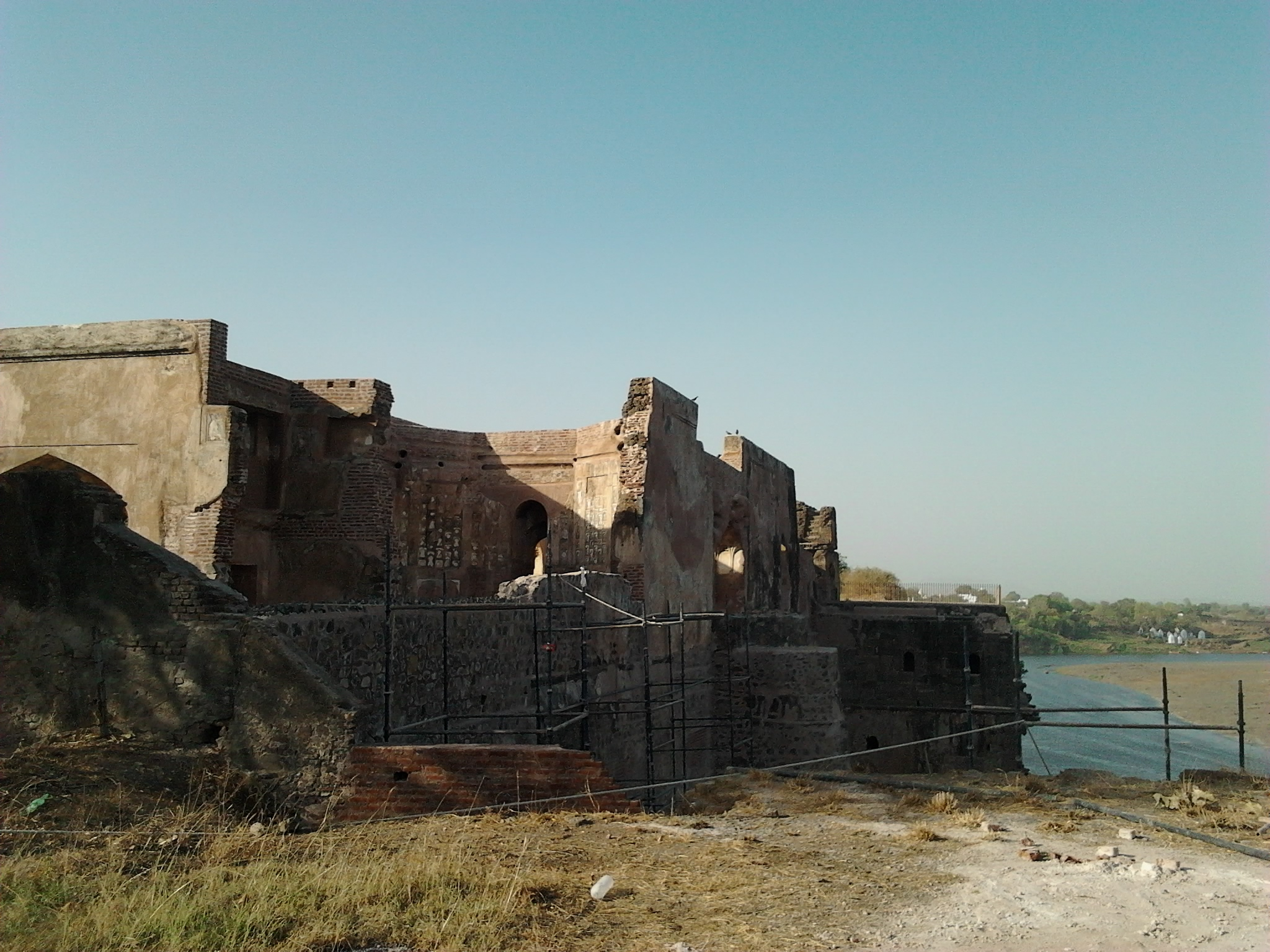
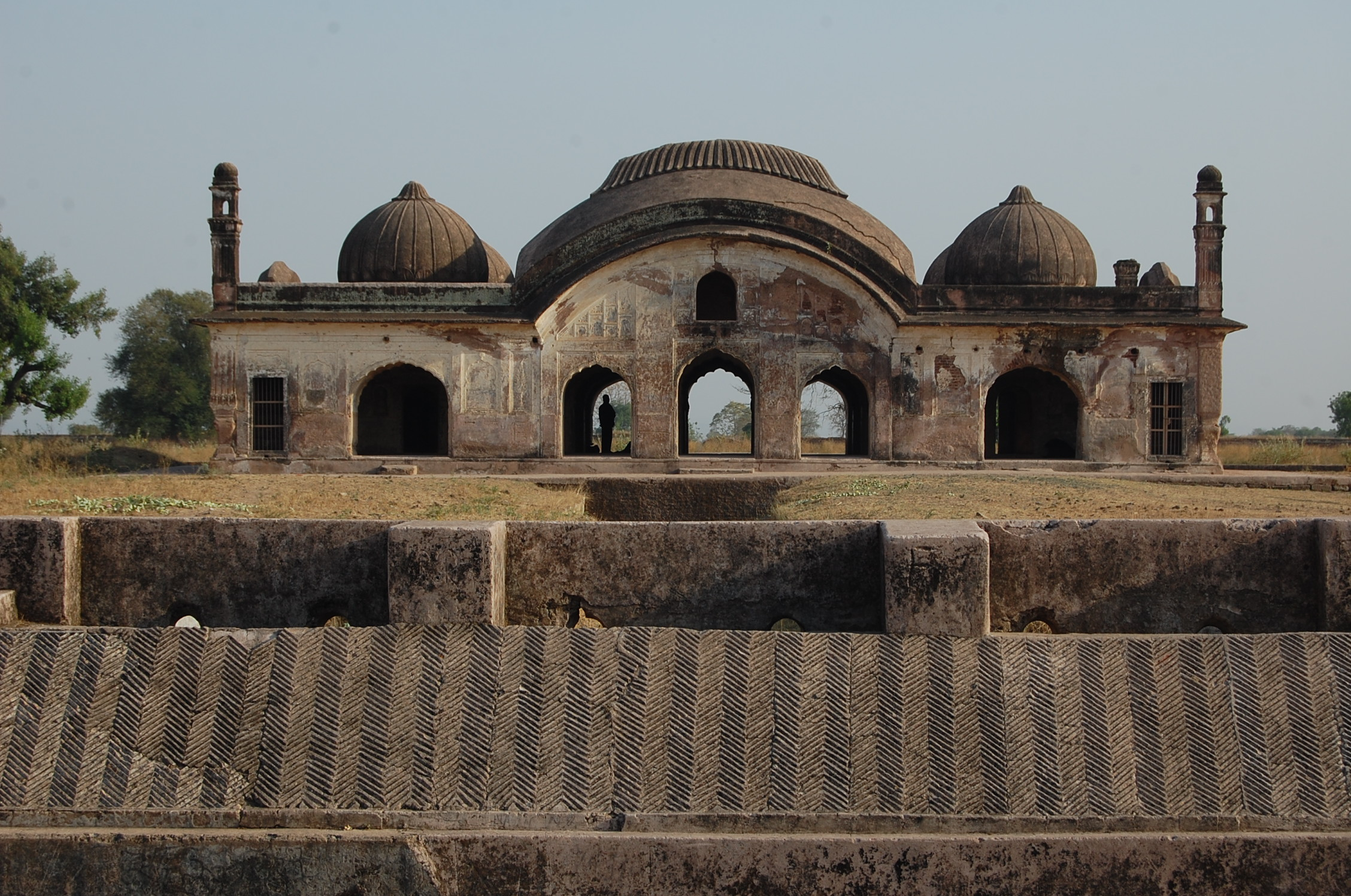
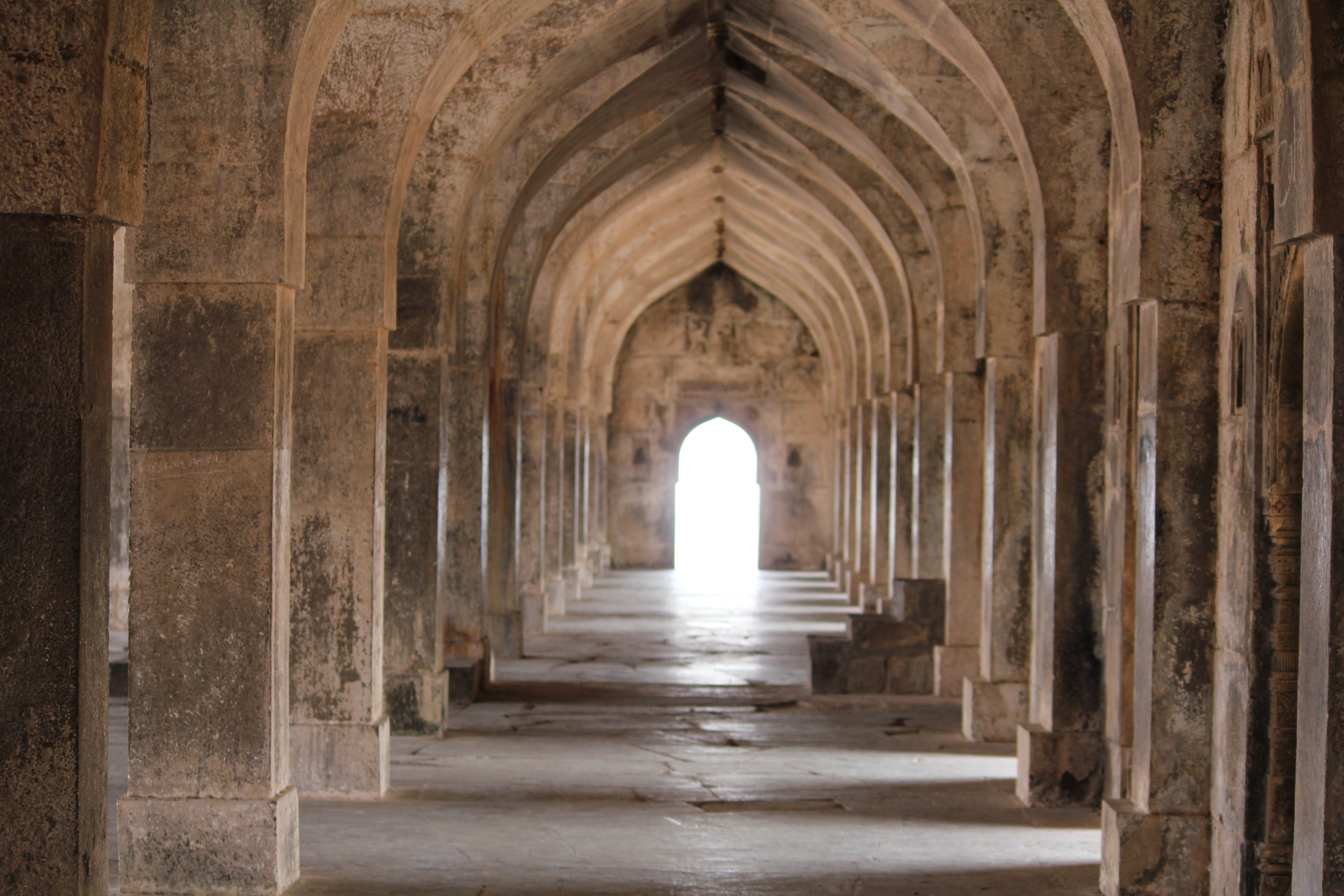
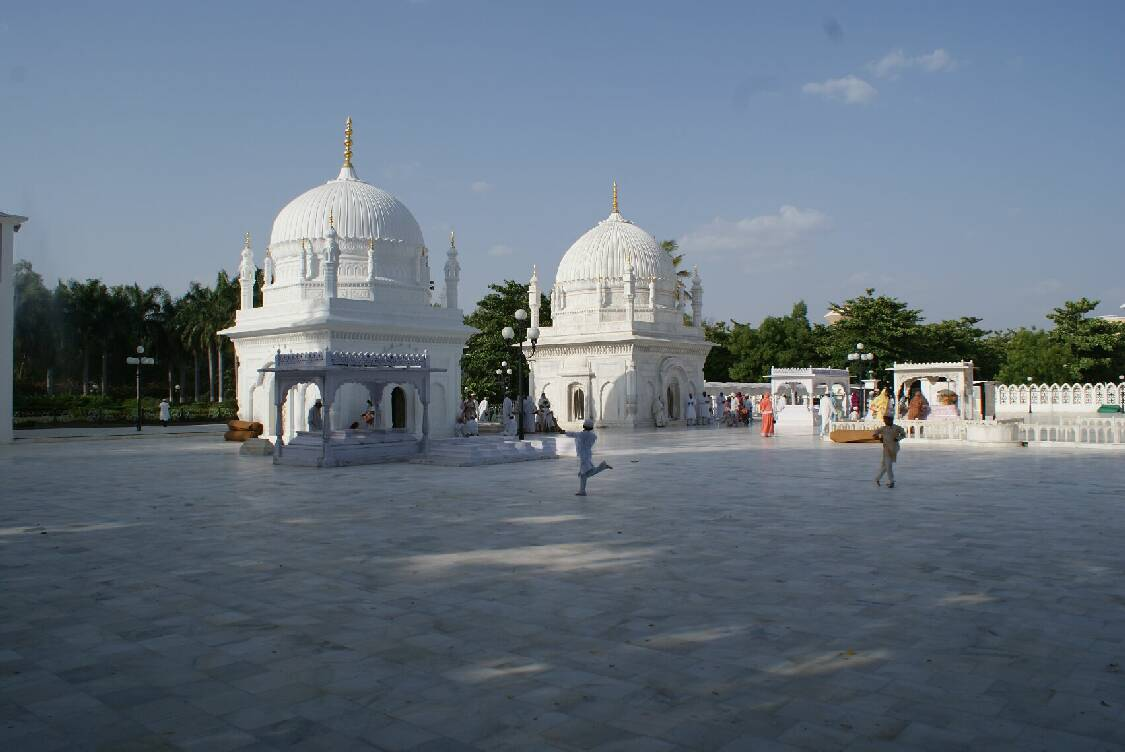
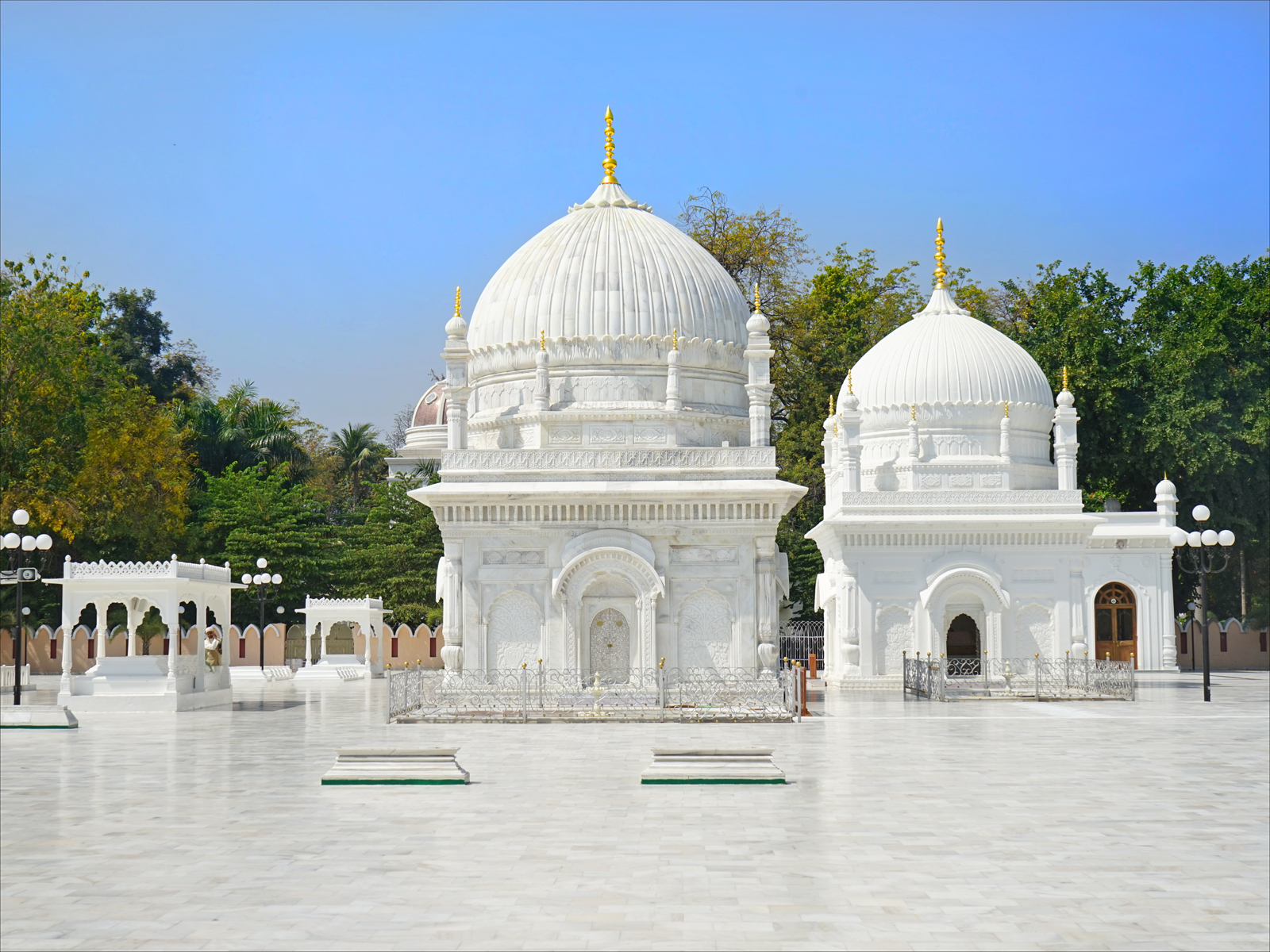
- From top, left to right: Shahi Qila, Asirgarh Fort, Jama Masjid, Dargaah-e-Hakimi, Burhanpur railway station

- Location within Madhya Pradesh Location within India
- Coordinates: 21°18′41″N 76°13′44″E
- Country: India
- State: Madhya Pradesh
- District: Burhanpur
- Founded: 1380
- Named for: Burhanuddin Gharib

Government
  - Mayor: Smt. Madhuri Atul Patel (BJP)

Area
  - Total: 34.6 km^{2} (13.4 sq mi)
- Elevation: 247 m (810 ft)

Population (2011)
  - Total: 210,891
  - Density: 6,100/km^{2} (15,800/sq mi)

Languages
  - Official: Hindi
- Time zone: UTC+5:30 (IST)
- PIN: 450331
- Telephone code: (+91) 7325
- ISO 3166 code: IN-MP
- Vehicle registration: MP-68
- Website: burhanpur.nic.in

Burhanpur is a historical city in the Indian state of Madhya Pradesh. It is the administrative seat of Burhanpur District. It is situated on the north bank of the Tapti River and 512 kilometres (318 mi) northeast of city of Mumbai , 340 kilometres (211 mi) southwest of the state's capital city of Bhopal. The city is a Municipal Corporation.

== History ==
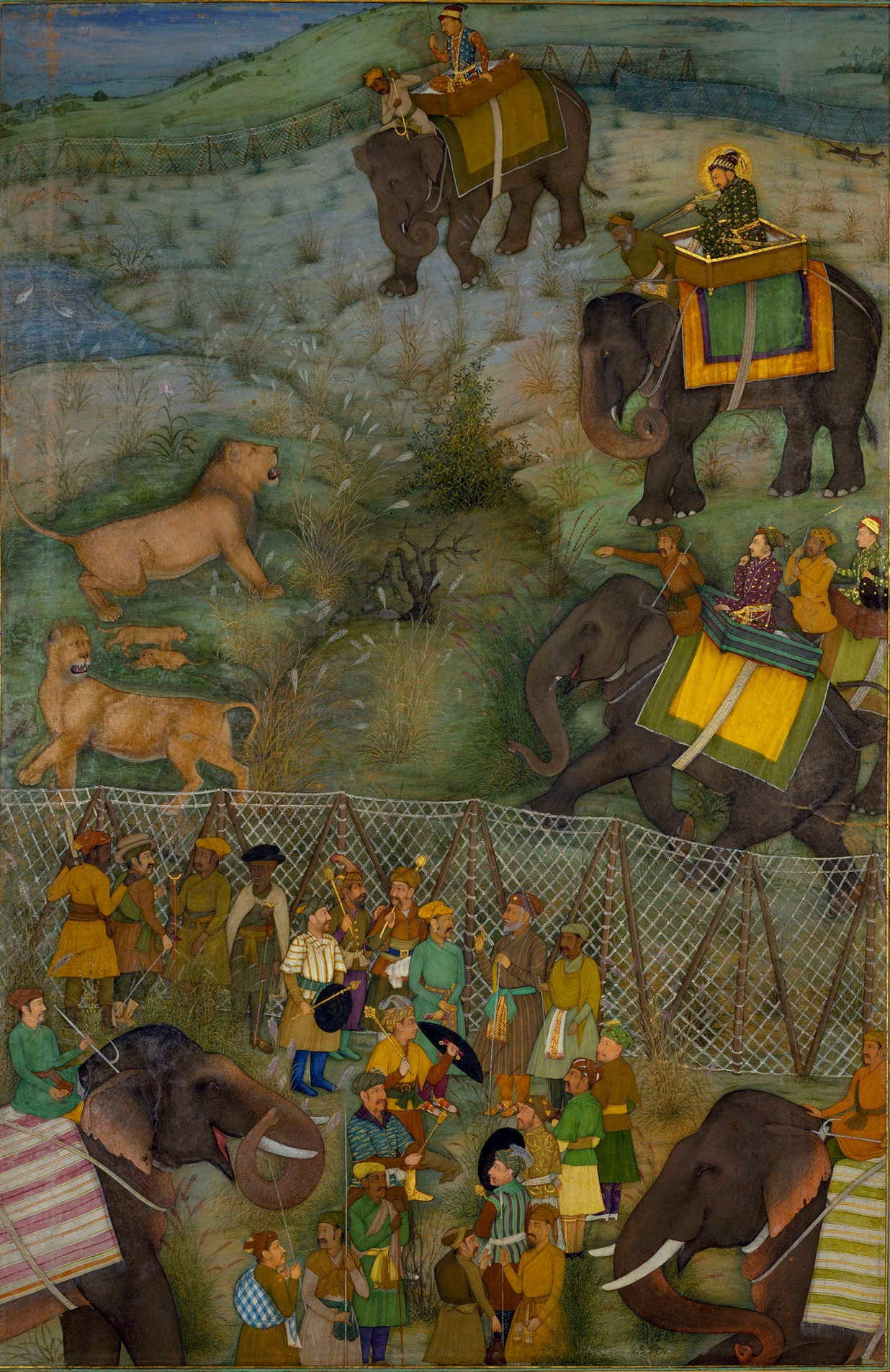
The Mughal Emperor Shah Jahan hunting wild Asiatic lions in Burhanpur (July 1630)

=== Pre-Mughal period ===
Burhanpur was an important town under the Rashtrakuta Dynasty from 753–982. Excavations of the Tapti River and Asirgarh Fort have discovered many coins, goddess idols and temples from the prehistoric era. However, Burhanpur came to prominence during the medieval period.

In 1388, Malik Nasir Khan, the Faruqi dynasty Sultan of Khandesh, discovered Burhanpur, at the behest of Shaikh Zainuddin and named it after a well-known medieval Sufi saint, Burhan-ud-Din. Burhanpur became the capital of the Khandesh sultanate. Later, Miran Adil Khan II (reigned 1457–1501), another sultan of this dynasty, built a citadel and a number of palaces in Burhanpur. During his long reign, Burhanpur was transformed into a major centre for trade and textile production.

=== Under the Mughals ===
In 1601, the Mughal emperor Akbar annexed the Khandesh sultanate and Burhanpur became the capital of Khandesh subah, one of three new top-level provinces in the Mughal Empire, added in 1601 (like Berar Subah in 1869 and Ahmadnagar subah in 1601–35) to the initial dozen as he conquered much of the Deccan. The town served as the residence of Khandesh's Mughal governor, Abdul Rahim Khan-i-Khanan, during Akbar and Jahangir's rule. He constructed a new water supply for the town, as well as several gardens. In 1609, Mughal emperor Jahangir appointed his second son Parviz to the governorship of the Mughal provinces of the Deccan, and the prince chose Burhanpur as his headquarters and his residence.

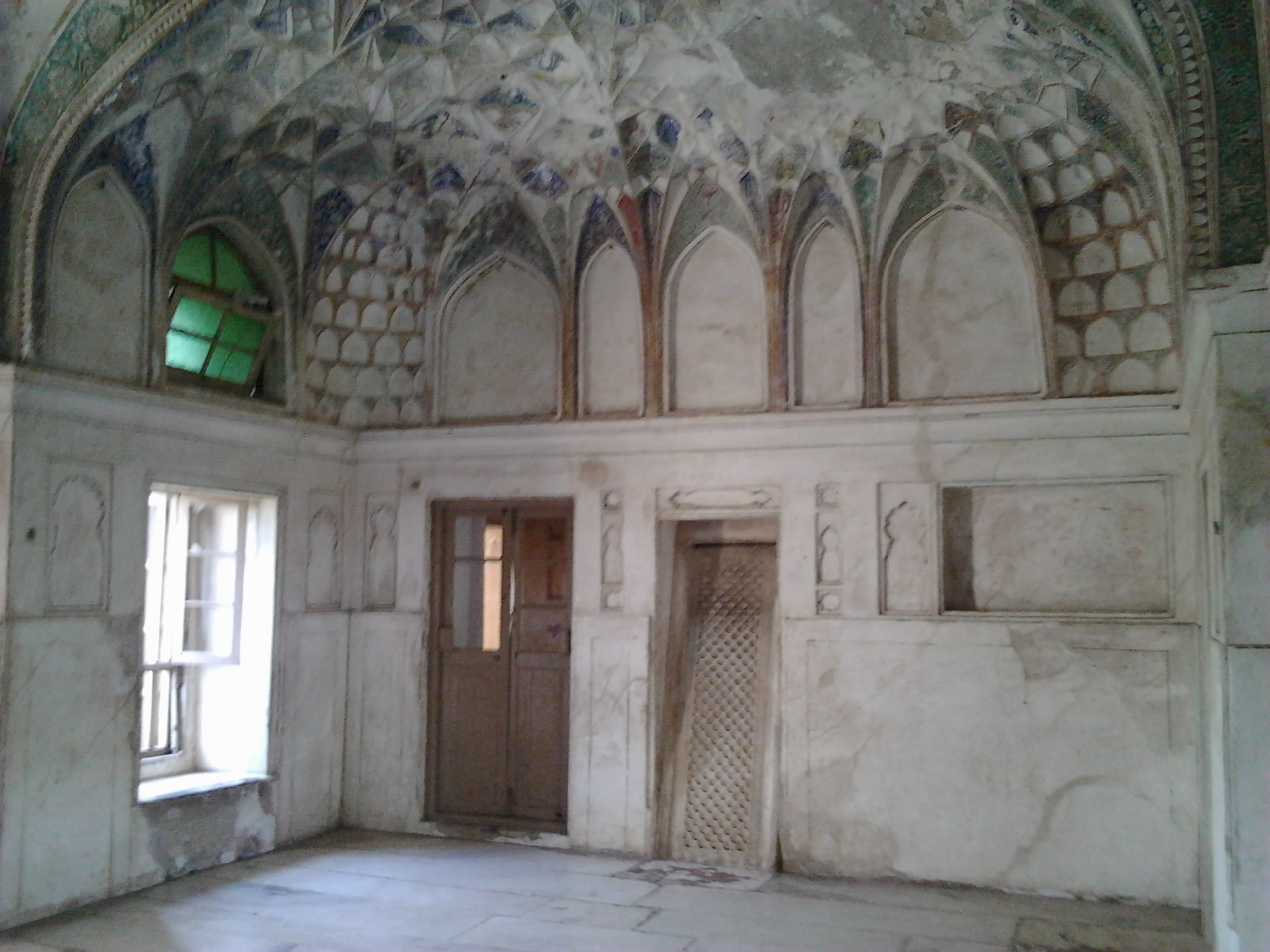
Royal bath or hammam Shahi qila Burhanpur

Many historical monuments survive in the area around Burhanpur, mainly dating from the rule of the great Mughal emperor Shah Jahan. Burhanpur was an important Mughal outpost. Shah Jahan spent a considerable amount of time in this town, and helped add to the Shahi Qila. The Shahi Qila is one majestic palace in Burhanpur, located to the west of the Tapti River. Diwan-i-Aam and Diwan-i-Khas were built on the terrace of the Qila. Little of it remains today, as the Qila is mostly in ruins. However, the parts of the palace that are still standing display exquisite sculpture and carvings. The main attraction at the palace is the hamam or royal bath. It was specifically built for Shah Jahan's wife, Mumtaz Mahal so that she could enjoy a luxurious bath. It is said that she died there while giving birth to her fourteenth child. Even today, the ceiling has many intricate paintings. One of these paintings depicts a monument which is said to have been the inspiration for the Taj Mahal, her final resting place. She was initially buried there for six months before being moved. The original grave called the Aahukhana is in disrepair.

Around 1670 Daud Khan was the Subhadar (Governor) of Khandesh province, under the rule of Aurangzeb.

=== Maratha conquest ===
In the 1720s, the town was taken by the Maratha Peshwa Bajirao during his expedition to Malwa and Delhi. In the 1750s, a Maratha army under Sadashivrao Bhau, who defeated the Nizam of Hyderabad, took control of the town. At the downfall of the Maratha Empire, the town was given to Maratha Sardar Holkar, Scindia, and then finally in 1818 was handed over to the British by the Marathas.

== Geography ==
Burhanpur is located on the southwestern border of Madhya Pradesh, near the banks of the Tapti River.

== Demographics ==
As 2011 Indian Census, the population of Burhanpur in 2011 was 210,886, of which males and females were 108,187 and 102,699 respectively. The population in the age group of 0 to 6 years was 28,930, of which 15,035 were males and 13,895 were females. The total number of literates in Burhanpur was 147,056, which constituted 69.7% of the population with male literacy of 73.3% and female literacy of 65.9%. The effective literacy rate of 7+ population of Burhanpur was 80.8%, of which male literacy rate was 85.1% and female literacy rate was 76.3%. The Scheduled Castes and Scheduled Tribes population was 14,440 and 2,179 respectively. Burhanpur had 38118 households in 2011.

Religions in Burhanpur City (2011)
Religion	Percent
Islam	50.53%
Hinduism	45.81%
Buddhism	2.67%
Jainism	0.60%
Other or not stated	0.39%

Islam and Hinduism is followed by 50.5% and 45.8 of the population respectively, with small number of Sikhs and Christians.

Languages of Burhanpur (2011)
1. Urdu (44.8%)
2. Hindi (23.6%)
3. Marathi (21.2%)
4. Gujarati (4.68%)
5. Sindhi (3.02%)
6. Nimadi (1.00%)
7. Others (1.73%)

Urdu is the most commonly spoken language. Hindi and Marathi are the other prominent languages. Gujarati, Sindhi and Marwari are also spoken. Nimadi is the local dialect.

== Economy ==
=== Industries ===
Burhanpur is known for its textile industry. It is the largest hub for the power loom industry in the state. It is also known for having one NTC (National Textile Corporation) project. It has a number of textile companies which are well known for interlining cloths, Grey Markin, Bleached Dhoti, Cambric, Power loom Cloth bakram and other types of fabric. There are also several cotton and oil mills in the city.

== Tourism ==
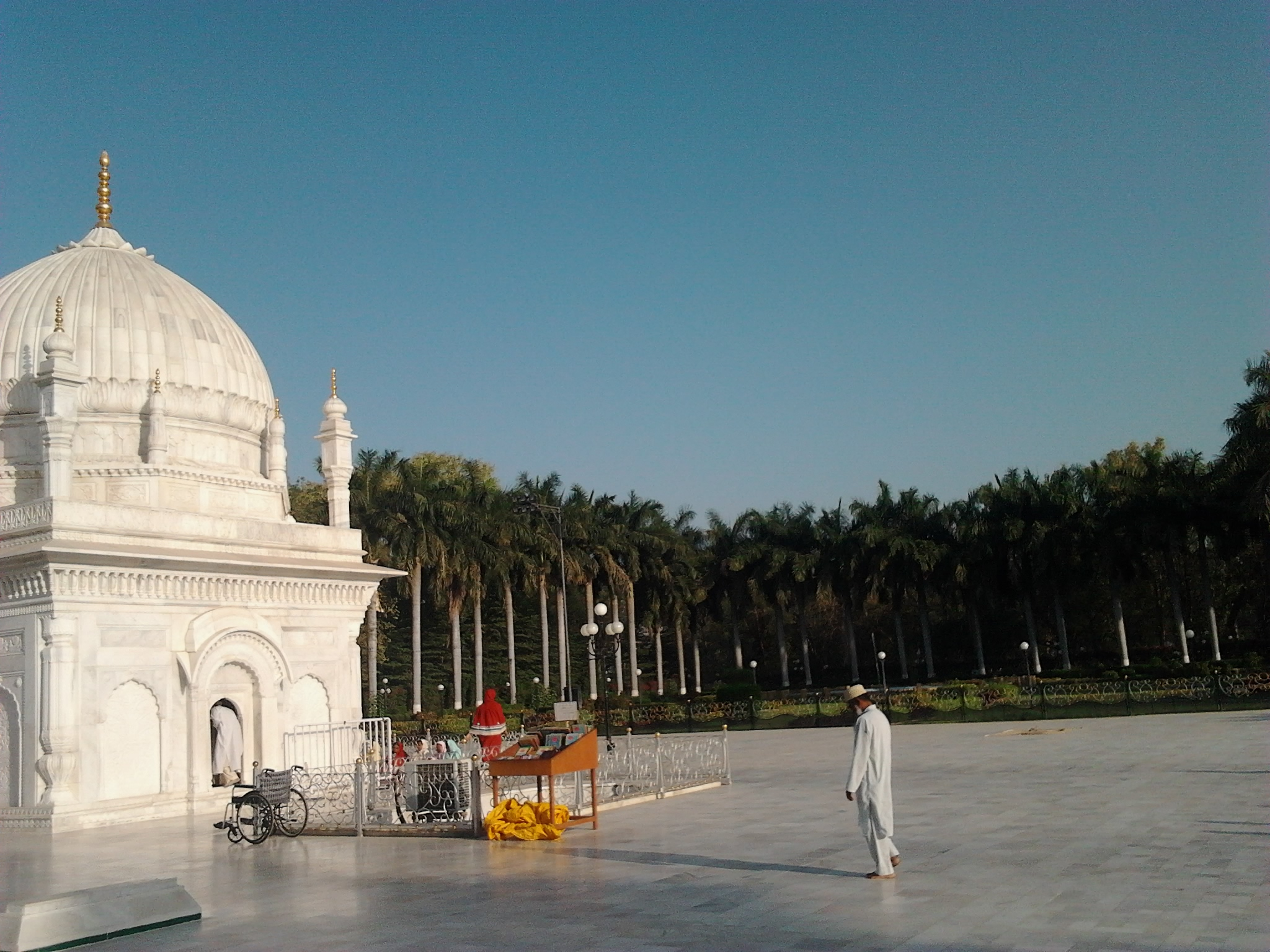
Dargah -e-Hakimi garden

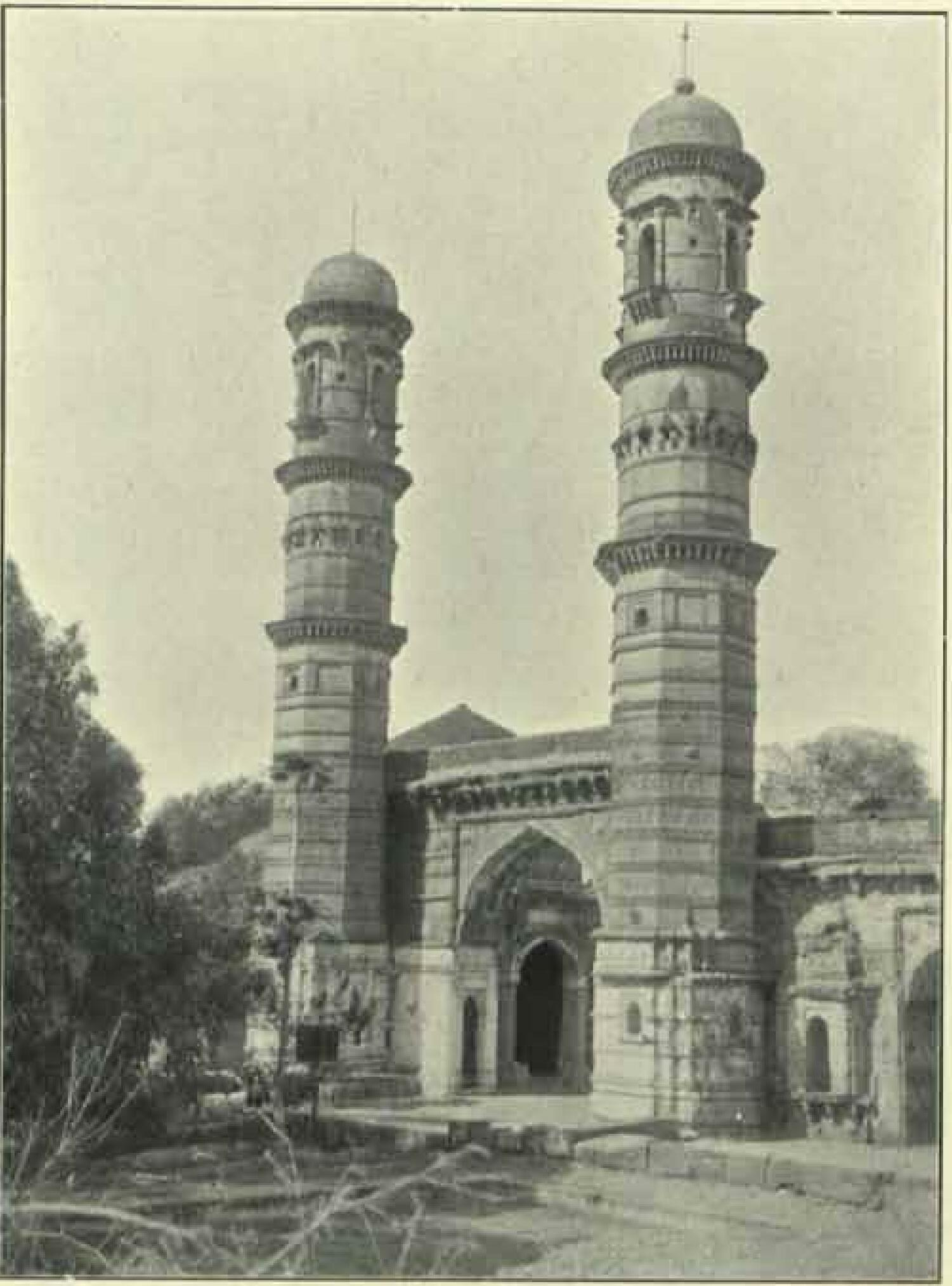
Bibi Ki Masjid

Burhanpur was ruled by several dynasties, and consequently has many visitor attractions of historical interest. It has three rivers, the Tapti, the Utavali and the Mohna, with several natural sights for visitors to Burhanpur. The city has four small ghats. Being the home of a very diverse population, Burhanpur has a notable Gurudwara, Masjid, Church, a world-famous Dargah

- Asirgarh Fort – The fort built is notable for its historical architecture. This fort during its prime time was difficult to win because of being built at a great height, with strong outer walls which are still standing intact. It is situated on Burhanpur-Khandwa Highway, 20 kilometres (12 mi) from Burhanpur.
- Shahi Qila – A rare fort with a complete garden on its terrace. It was built in the Farooqi Dynasty and ruled by Shahjahan for a long period of time. His beloved wife Mumtaz died here and it is believed that the Taj Mahal was decided to be made in Burhanpur before the plan was cancelled due to lack of white marble here at the time, though Mumtaz was buried here for six months after her death until Taj Mahal construction was completed.
- Jama Masjid – The Jama Masjid is a historic monument as well as a place of worship. It is centrally located in Gandhi Chowk. The construction of Jama Masjid started in Farooqi rule. The construction of the monument took very long and continued even after Farooqi leader Adil Shah's demise. Then Emperor Akbar supervised and completed the work of the Masjid. There are two large minarets, three round cupolas and extensive artwork on its symmetric pillars which are well conserved.
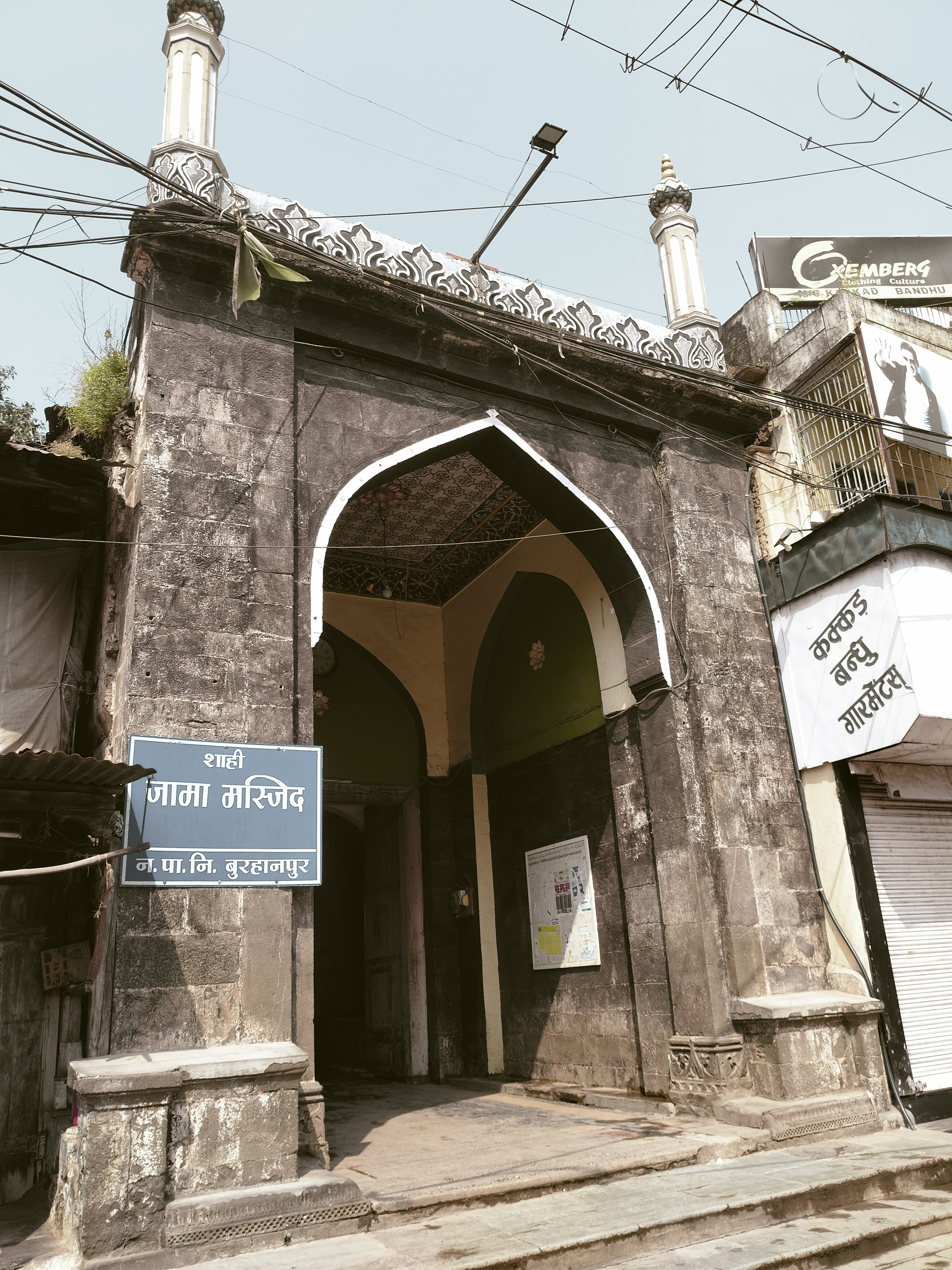
Main entrance of Jama Masjid, Burhanpur

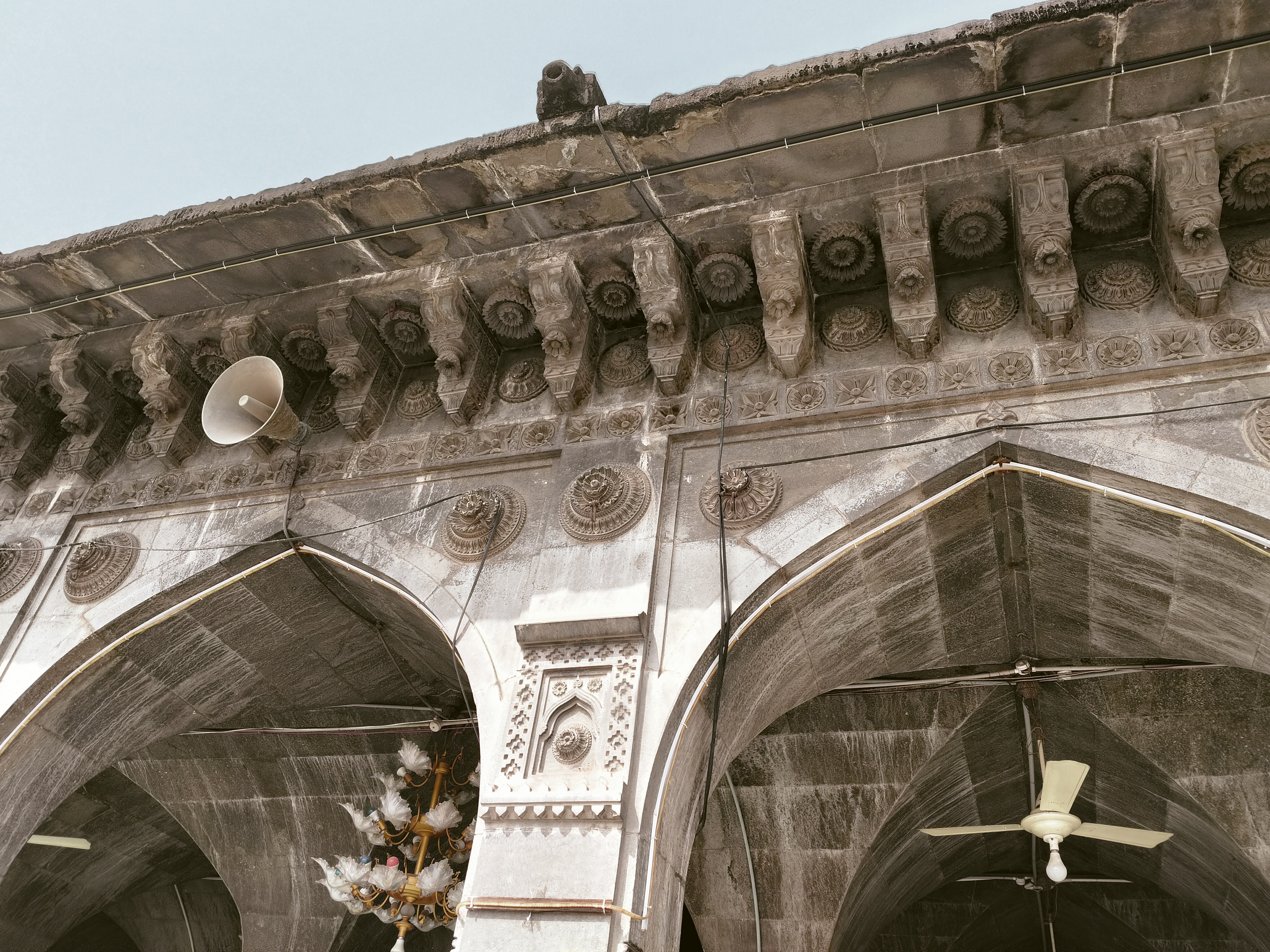
Mosque front decorative entrance facade

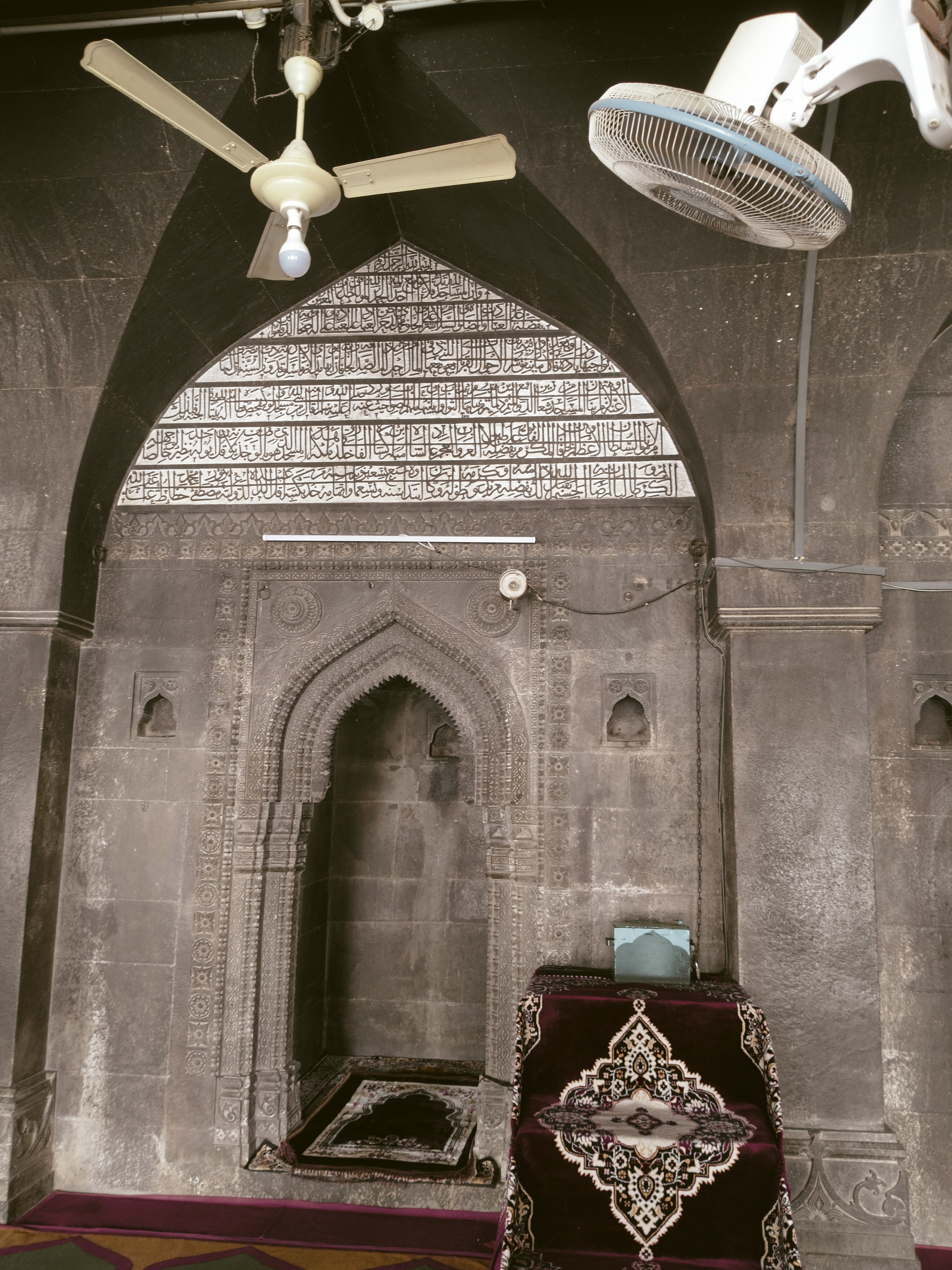
Qibla, Jama Masjid

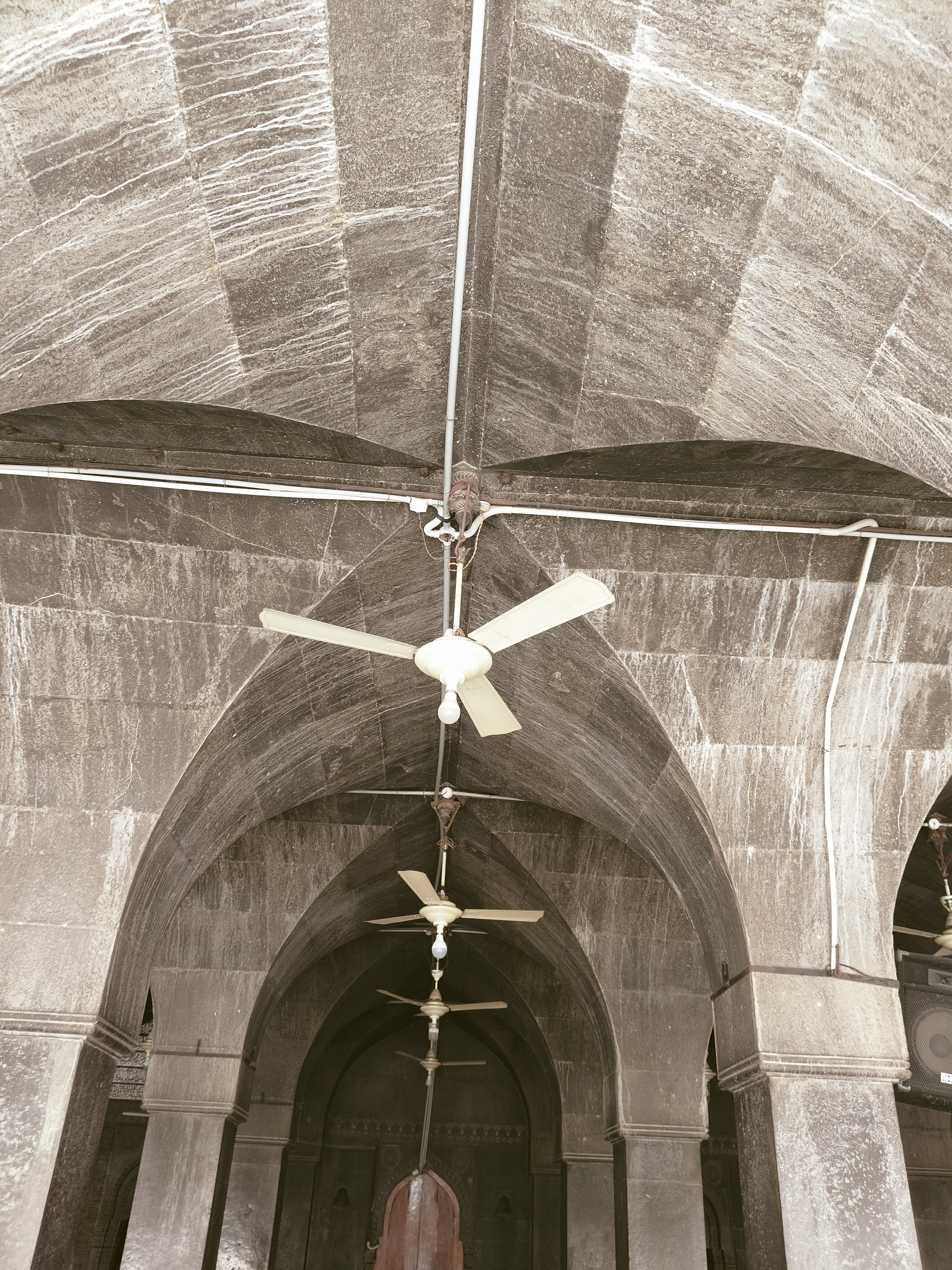
Four arc shape pillars with midpoint lock at roof top

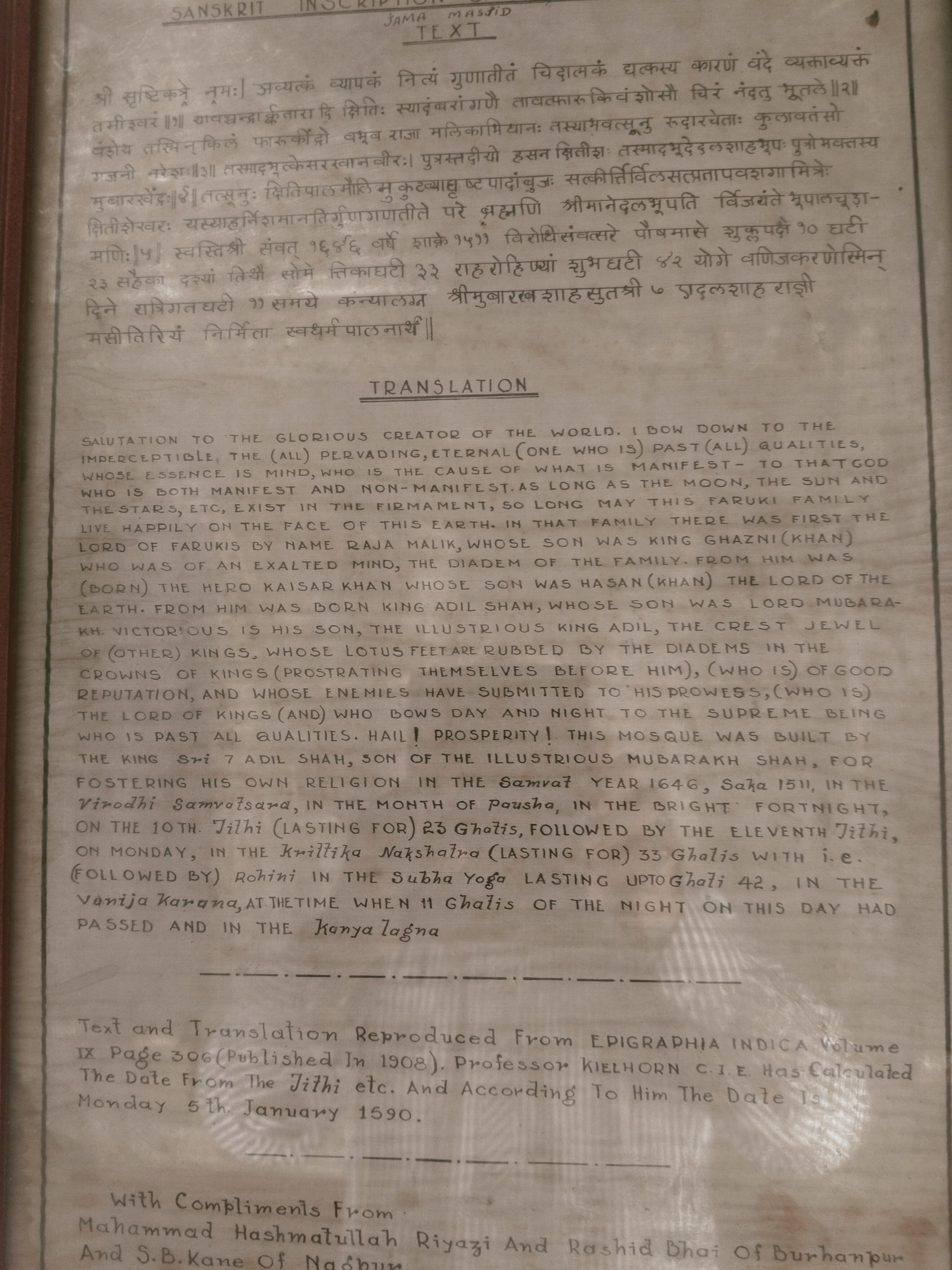
photo of Translation of inscription, engraved on masjid wall

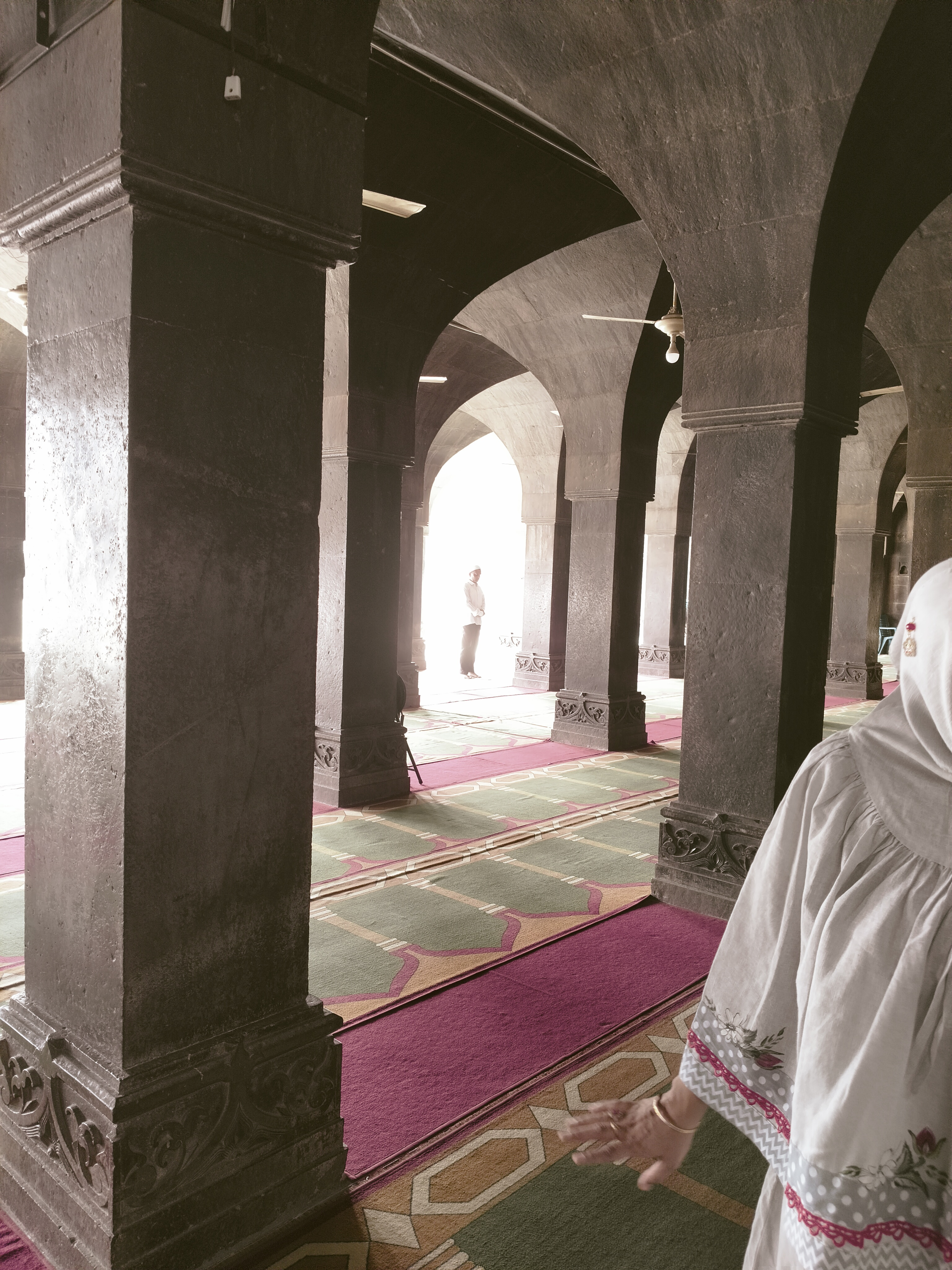
Pillar alignment from Qibla to extreme outer entrance gate

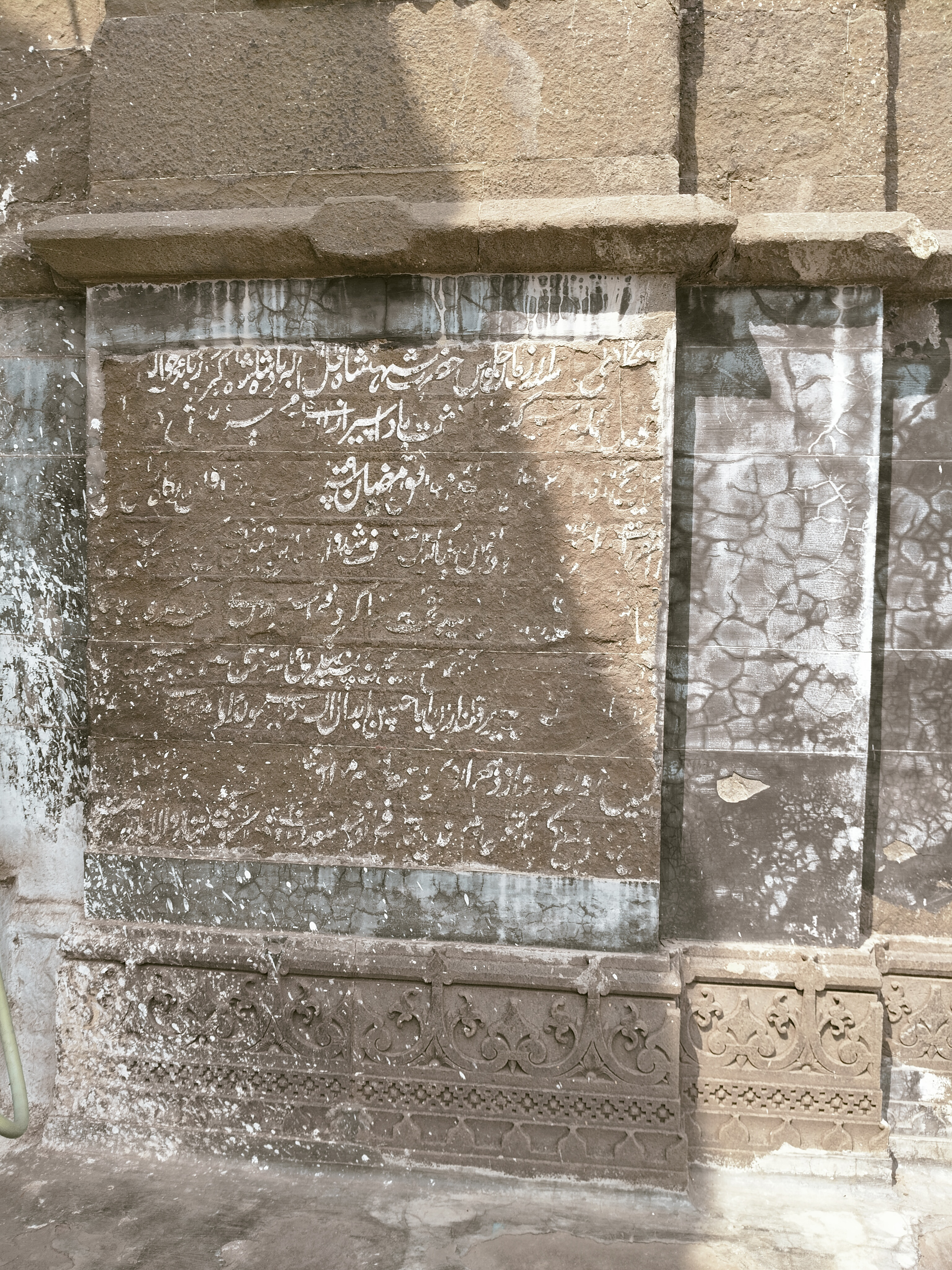
Engraved writing detailing Jama Masjid history

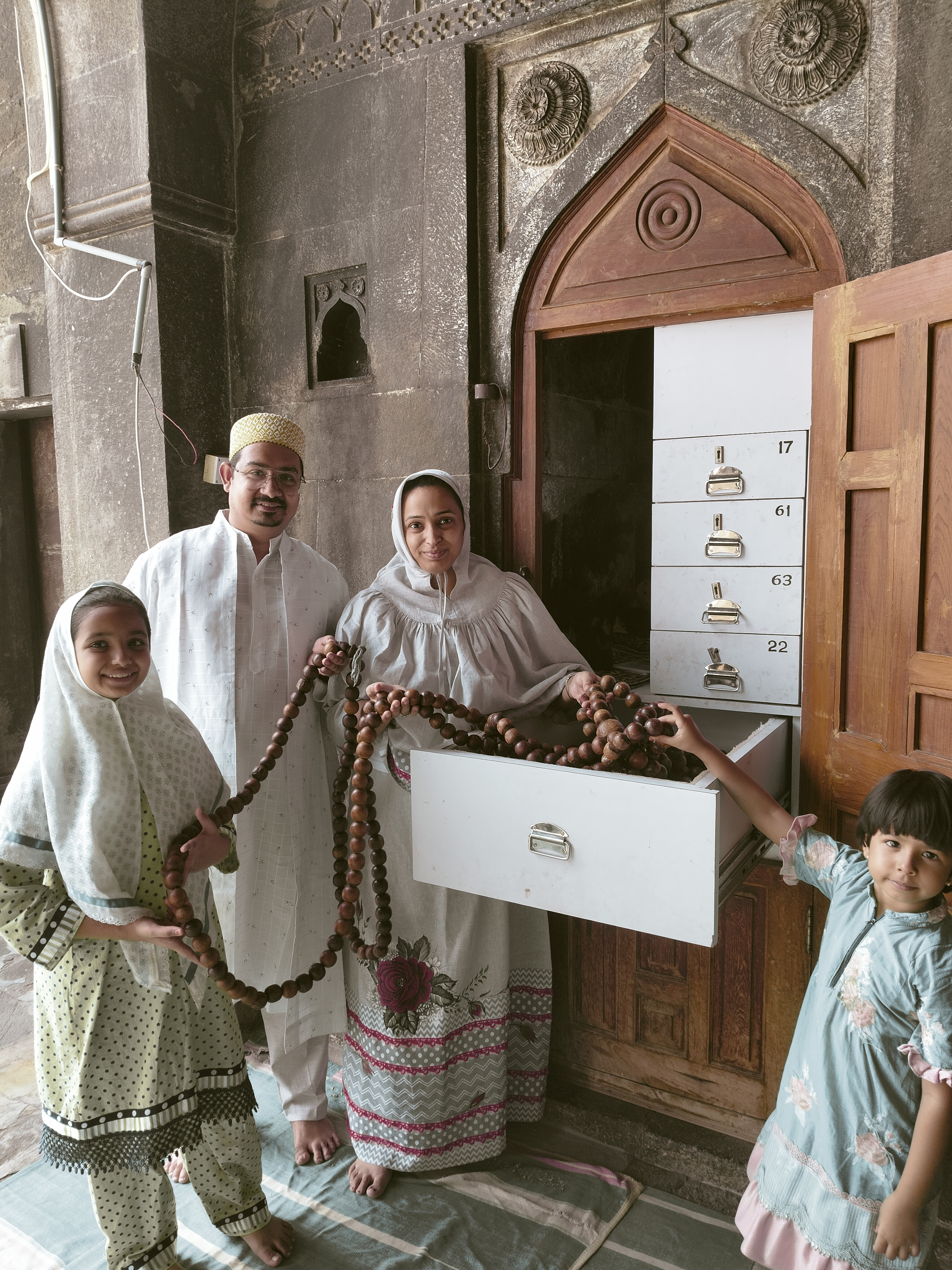
Big Tasbeeh of old Mogul era kept in Jama masjid

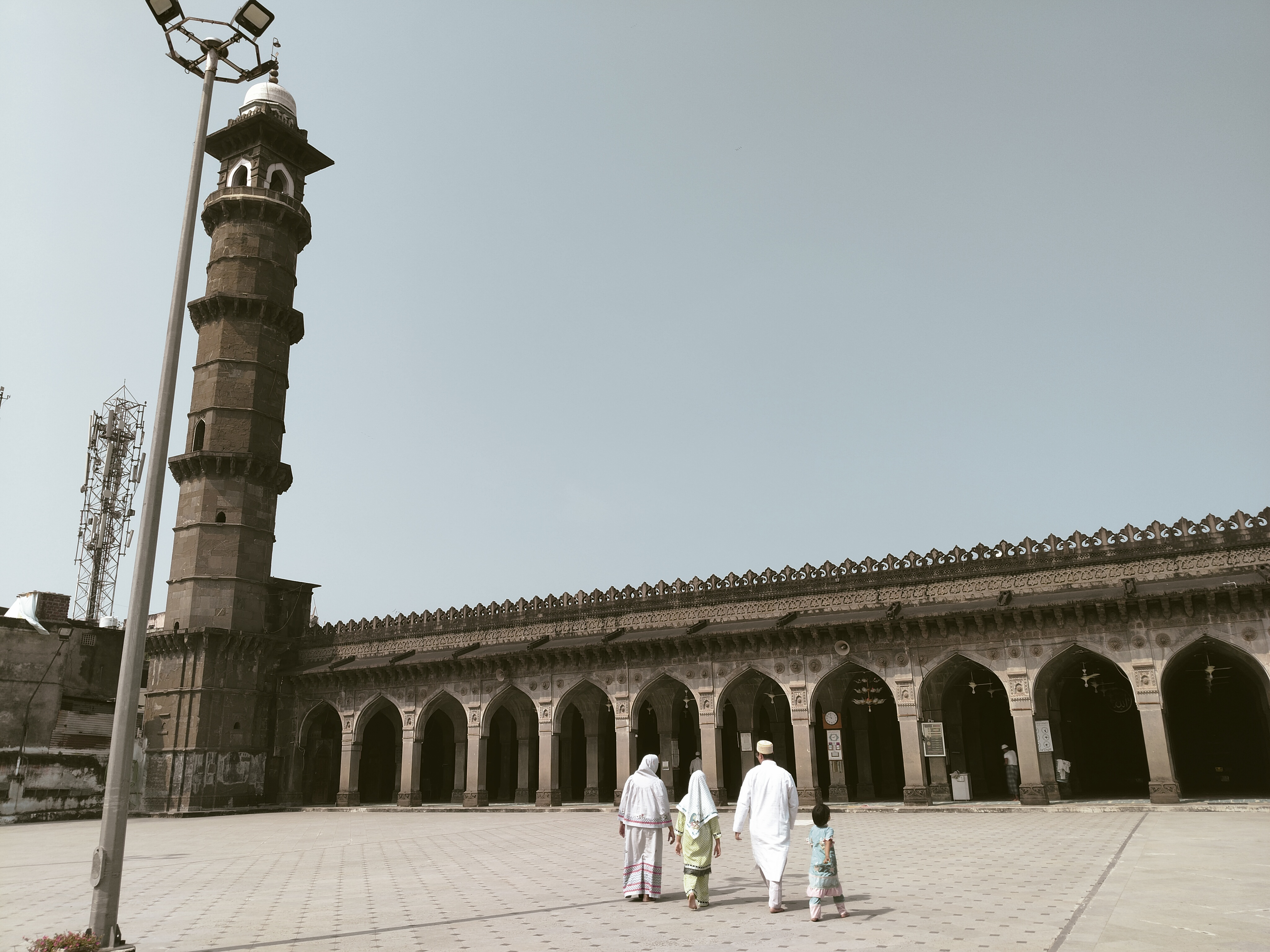
Jama masjid, Burhanpur Minaret and front open space

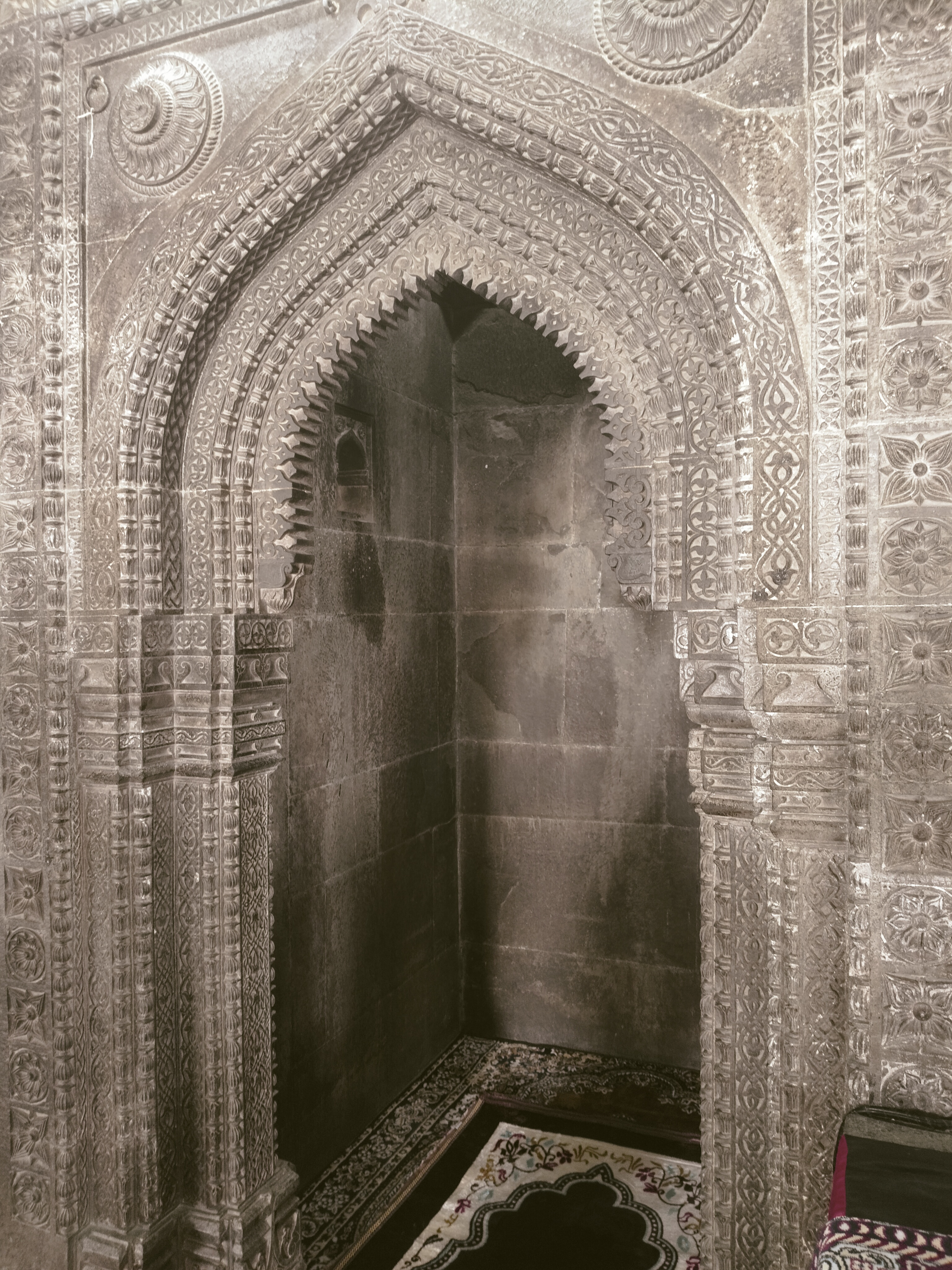
Qibla sculpture in detail
- Dargah-e-Hakimi – The tomb complex 'Dargah-e-Hakimi' includes mosques, gardens, and accommodation facilities for visitors. Here the holy Dawoodi Bohra saint, Sayyedi Abdul Qadir Hakimuddin is buried, with his monument visited by pilgrims from several countries.
- Tomb of Shah Nawaz Khan - The tomb of Shah Nawaz Khan is a visible grand tomb of the Mughal rule built of black stone on the banks of the Utavali River, at a distance of 2 kilometres north of Burhanpur. This building has its own special place among other buildings built during the Mughal period in Burhanpur. Shah Nawaz Khan's real name was 'Iraj'. He was born in Ahmedabad (Gujarat). He was the eldest son of Subedar Abdul Rahim Khankhana of Burhanpur. This tomb is in good condition even after so many years. This place is considered the best tourist destination for the city residents.

== Transport ==
Burhanpur is well connected to other cities of India via railway network. The city has one railway station, while regular buses are available for travel to nearby cities. The closest airport is Jalgaon Airport, a domestic airport, which is present on south side of the city, while Devi Ahilya Bai Holkar Airport is the nearest customs airport within the state. The Chhatrapati Shivaji Maharaj International Airport is the nearest international airport located in Mumbai in Maharashtra.

== In popular culture ==
- The city is mentioned in Jules Verne's Around the World in 80 Days as Burhampoor.
- Sacking of Burhanpur (1681) by the Maratha army was shown in 2025 film Chhaava.

== See also ==
- Zainabadi Mahal, concubine of Aurangzeb from Zainabad in Burhanpur
