= Jama Masjid, Burhanpur =

Mosque in Burhanpur, Madhya Pradesh, India

Jama Masjid
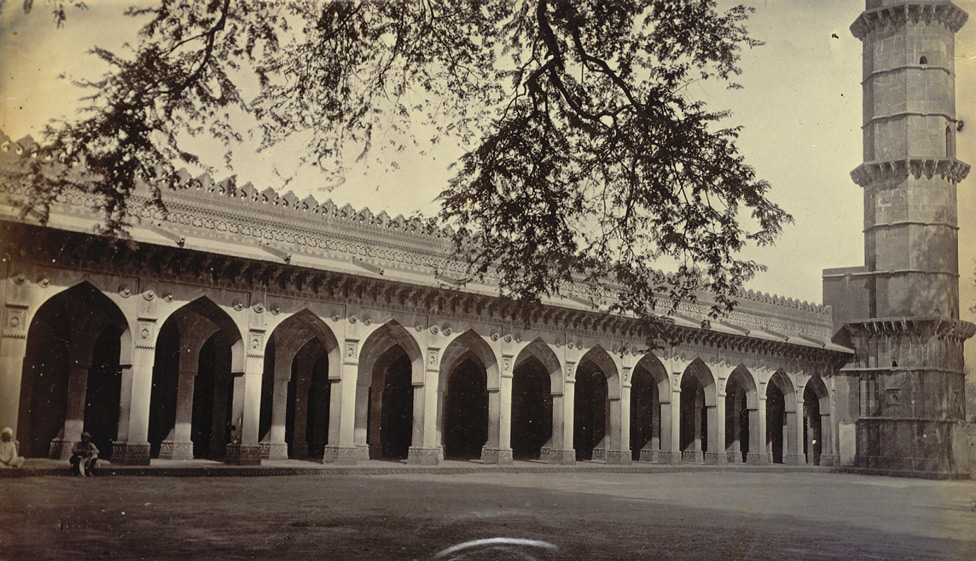
- 19th-century photograph of the mosque, by Henry Cousens

- Location of the mosque in Madhya Pradesh

Religion
- Affiliation: Sunni Islam
- Ecclesiastical or organizational status: Friday mosque
- Status: Active

Location
- Location: Burhanpur, Madhya Pradesh
- Country: India
- Interactive map of Jama Masjid
- Coordinates: 21°18′59″N 76°13′56″E

Architecture
- Type: Mosque architecture
- Style: Indo-Islamic
- Founder: Adil Shah IV of the Faruqi dynasty
- Groundbreaking: 1588
- Completed: 1590

Specifications
- Minaret: Two
- Materials: Black stone

Monument of National Importance
- Official name: Jama Masjid, Burhanpur

The Jama Masjid is a Sunni Friday mosque, located in Burhanpur, in the state of Madhya Pradesh, India. The mosque is a Monument of National Importance.

== History ==
According to the Sanskrit and Arabic inscriptions within the mosque, the mosque can be dated from the 16th century. It was commissioned by Adil Shah IV, a son of Mubarakh Shah of the Faruqi dynasty. The mosque was built as the royal congregational mosque of Burhanpur, located within the centre of the city. Construction of the mosque began in 1588 CE. Repairs to the mosque were made by the Mughal emperors Akbar and Aurangzeb during their reigns. (Note: English translation, text and translation of the inscription.)

== Architecture ==
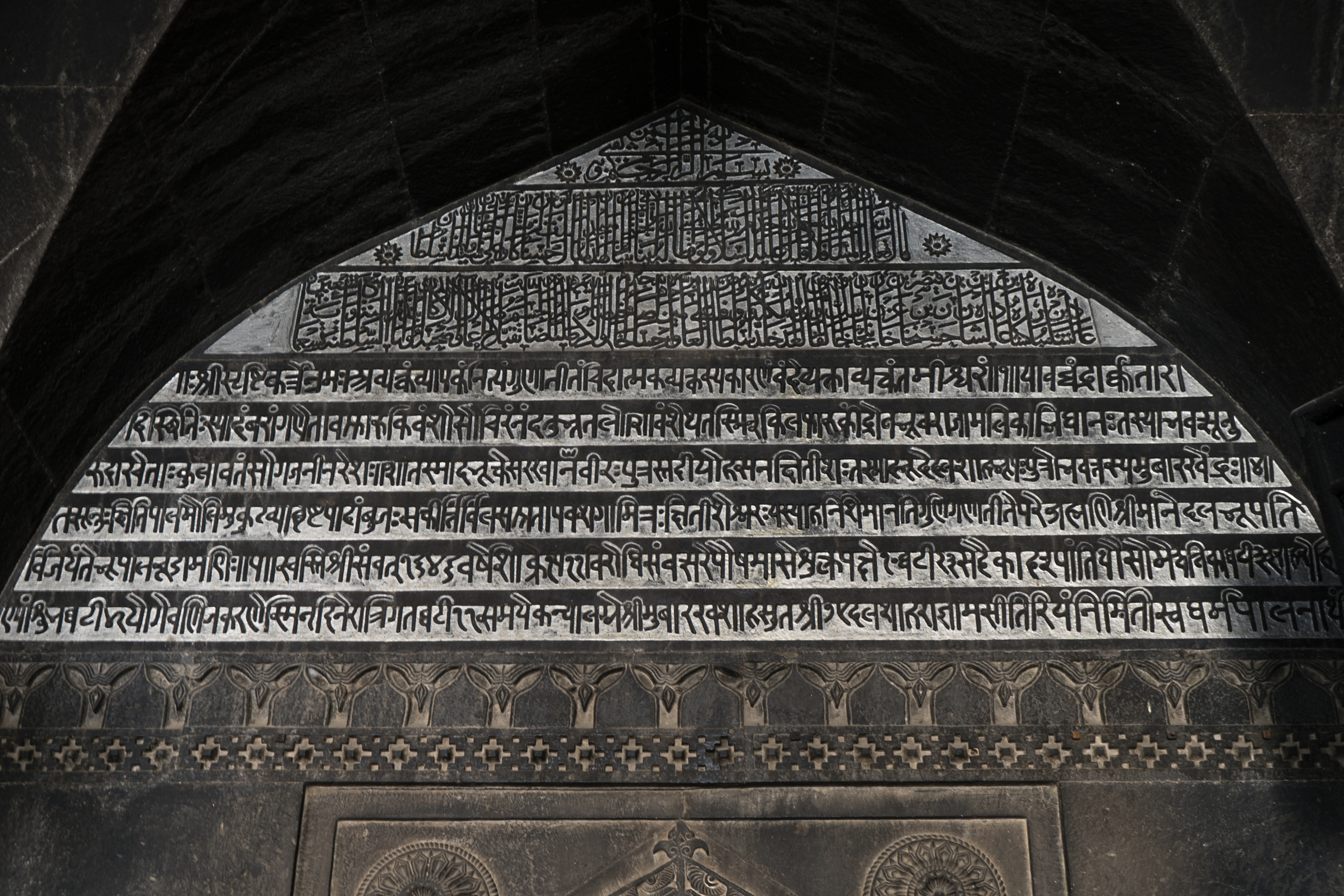
Sanskrit and Arabic inscriptions within the mosque

The mosque has an open courtyard, with the prayer hall towards the west. The prayer hall is flat-roofed, and has fifteen arched openings on the façade. The main attraction of the mosque are its symmetrical pillars made of special black stone, which was brought from a very far place. The stones were so bulky and heavy that its transportation was costed the king in rate of gold. The pillars were designed in such a fashion that four pillars combined and, when locked at the centre of the meeting point at top, they covered the complete top area and form roof by themselves. The pillars do not obstruct the visibility of the imam standing at the Qibla from the extreme outer façade. A parapet, composed of battlements, runs along the roof. The façade is flanked by two five-storied minarets.

=== Interior ===
The prayer hall is five bays deep. The mosque has fifteen mihrabs. Over the central mihrab is an Arabic inscription. Over the southern mihrab is a bilingual inscription, with Arabic text on top and Sanskrit text at the bottom. The inscription mentions the inauguration date as 10th of “pausha” [day], “samvat” [month], 1646 “saka” [year], hence, on 5 January 1590 CE. In 1601 an additional inscription was added, in Persian.

== Gallery ==
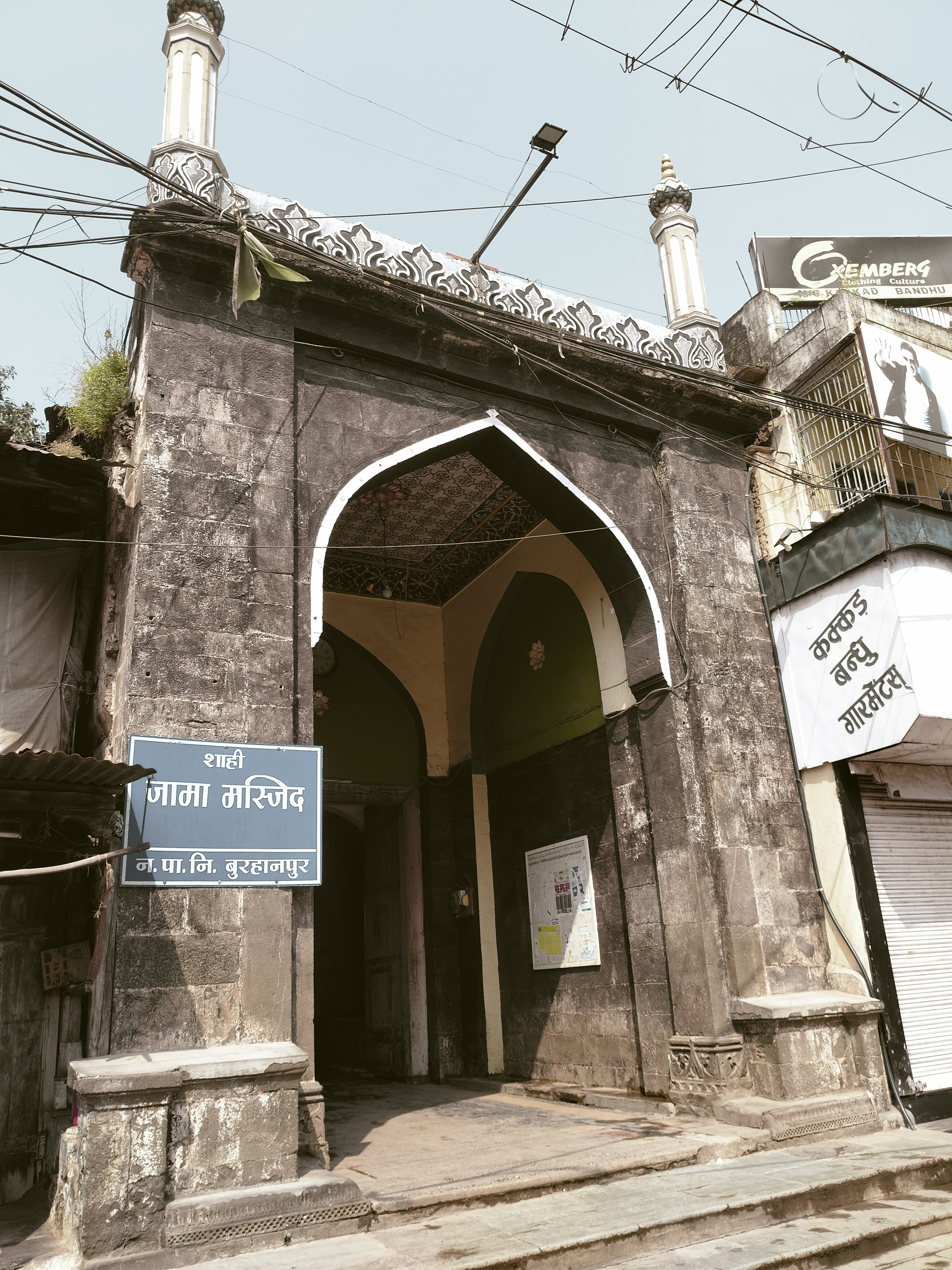
Main entrance

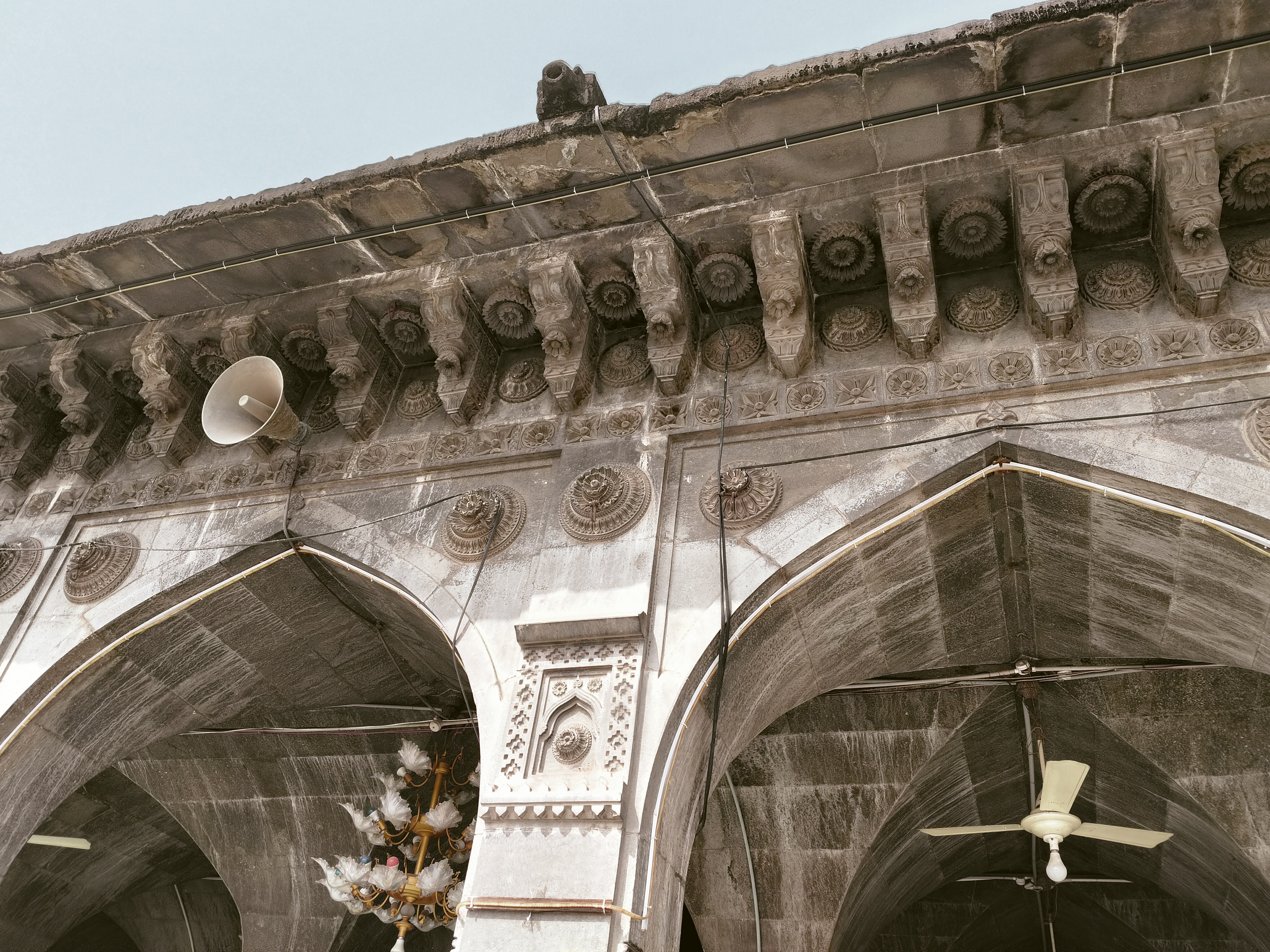
Decorative entrance façade

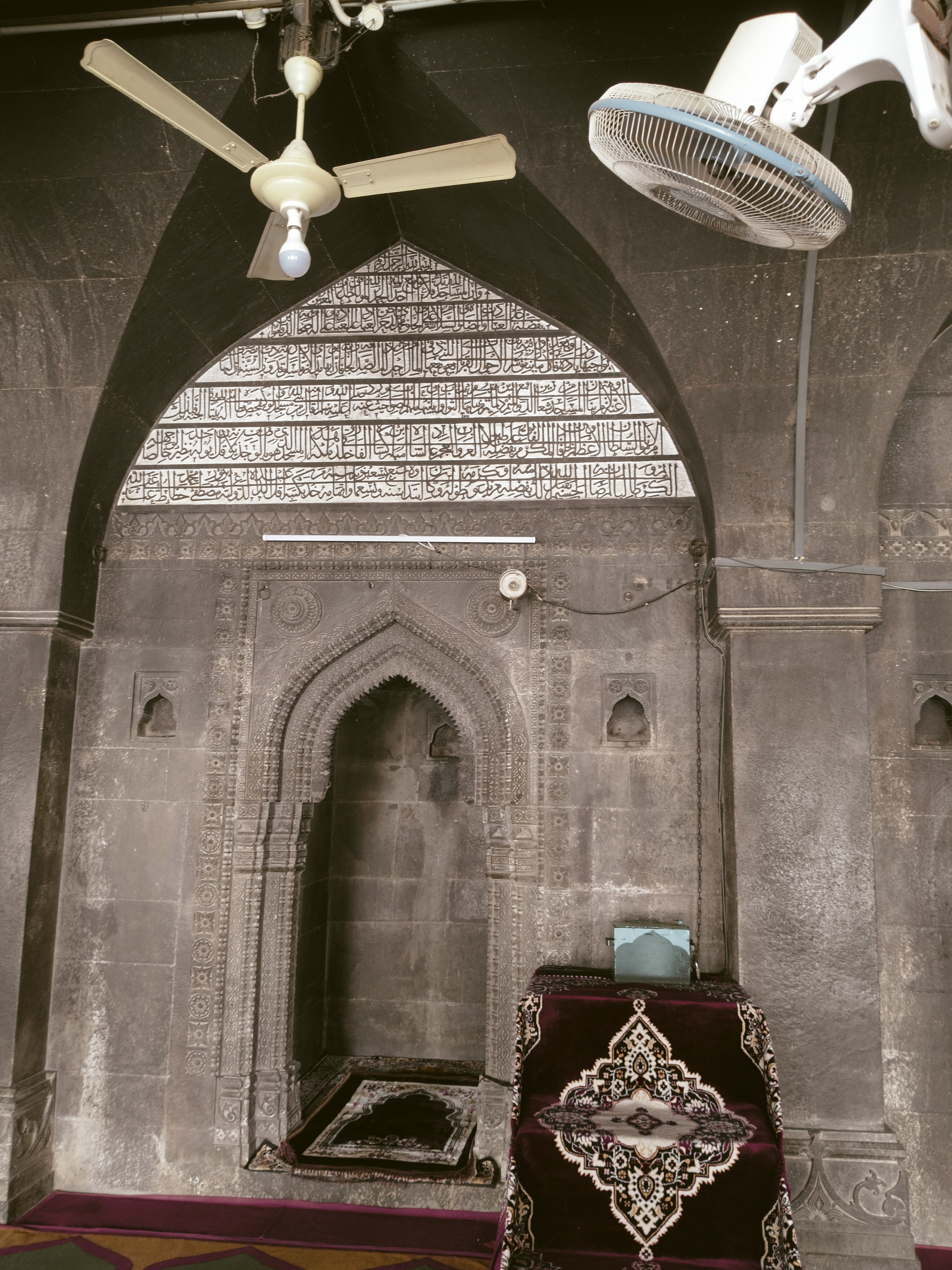
Qibla

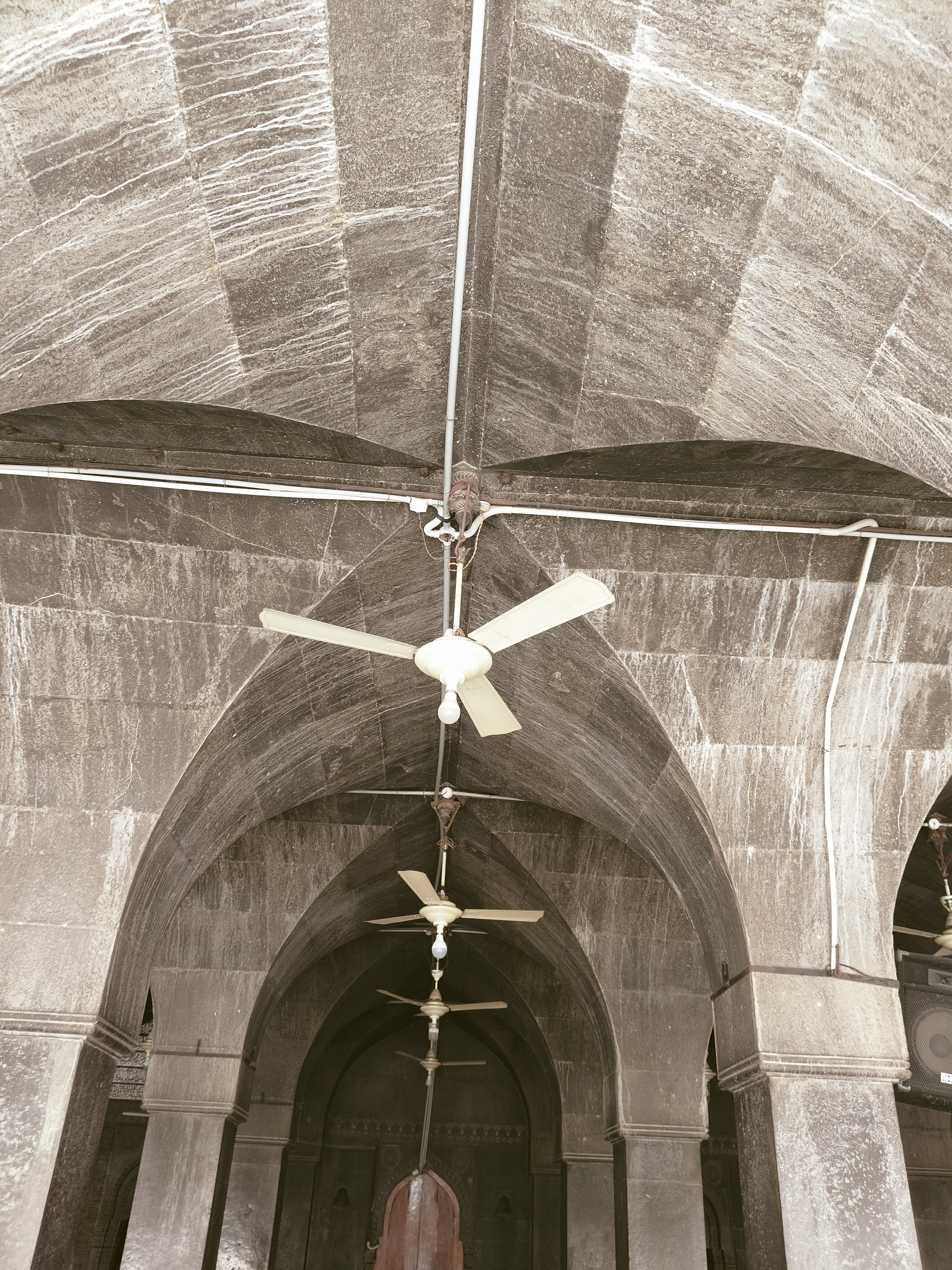
Four arc shape pillars with midpoint lock at roof top centre

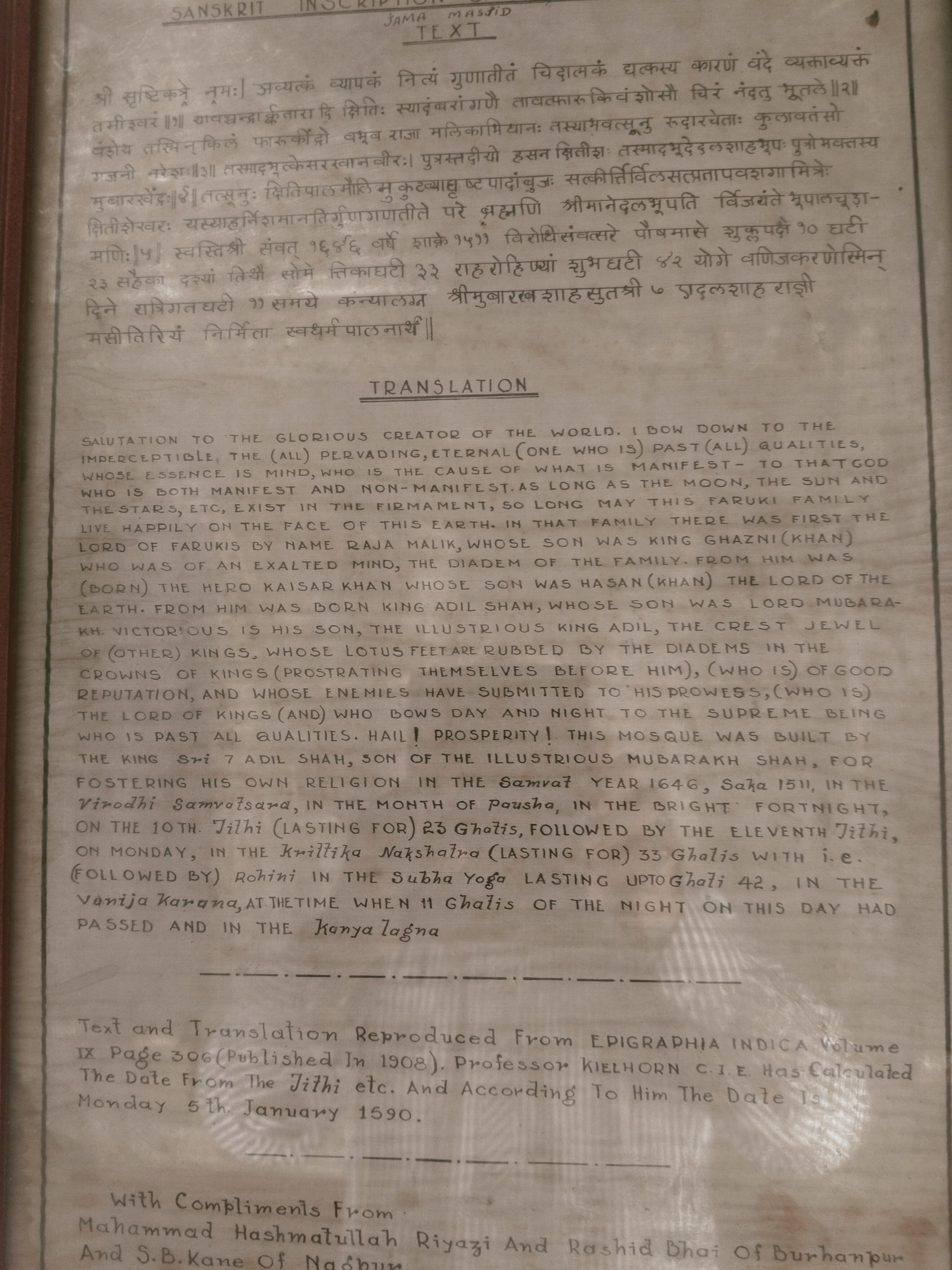
Photo of translated inscription, engraved on the mosque wall

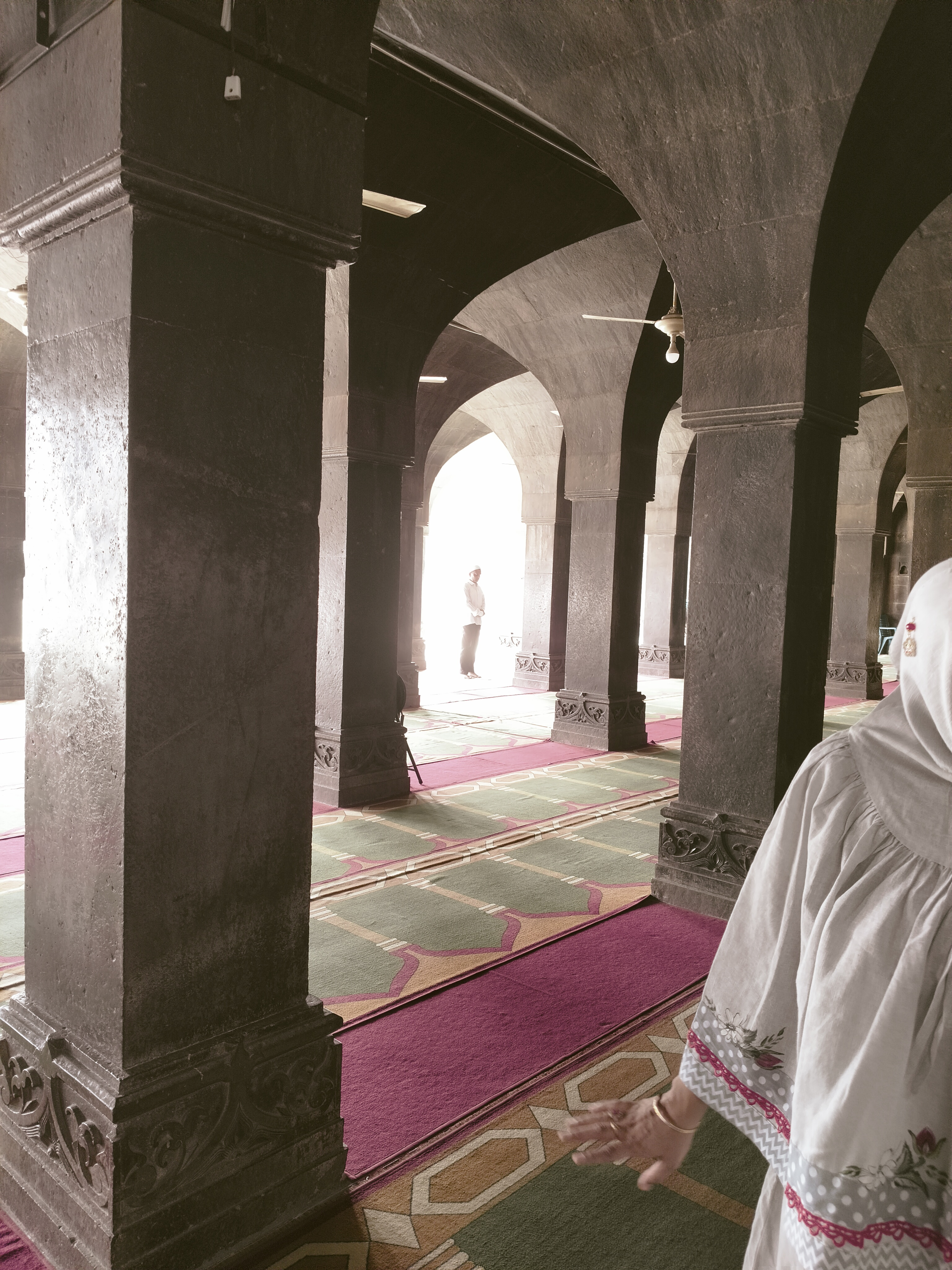
Pillar alignment from Qibla to extreme outer entrance façade

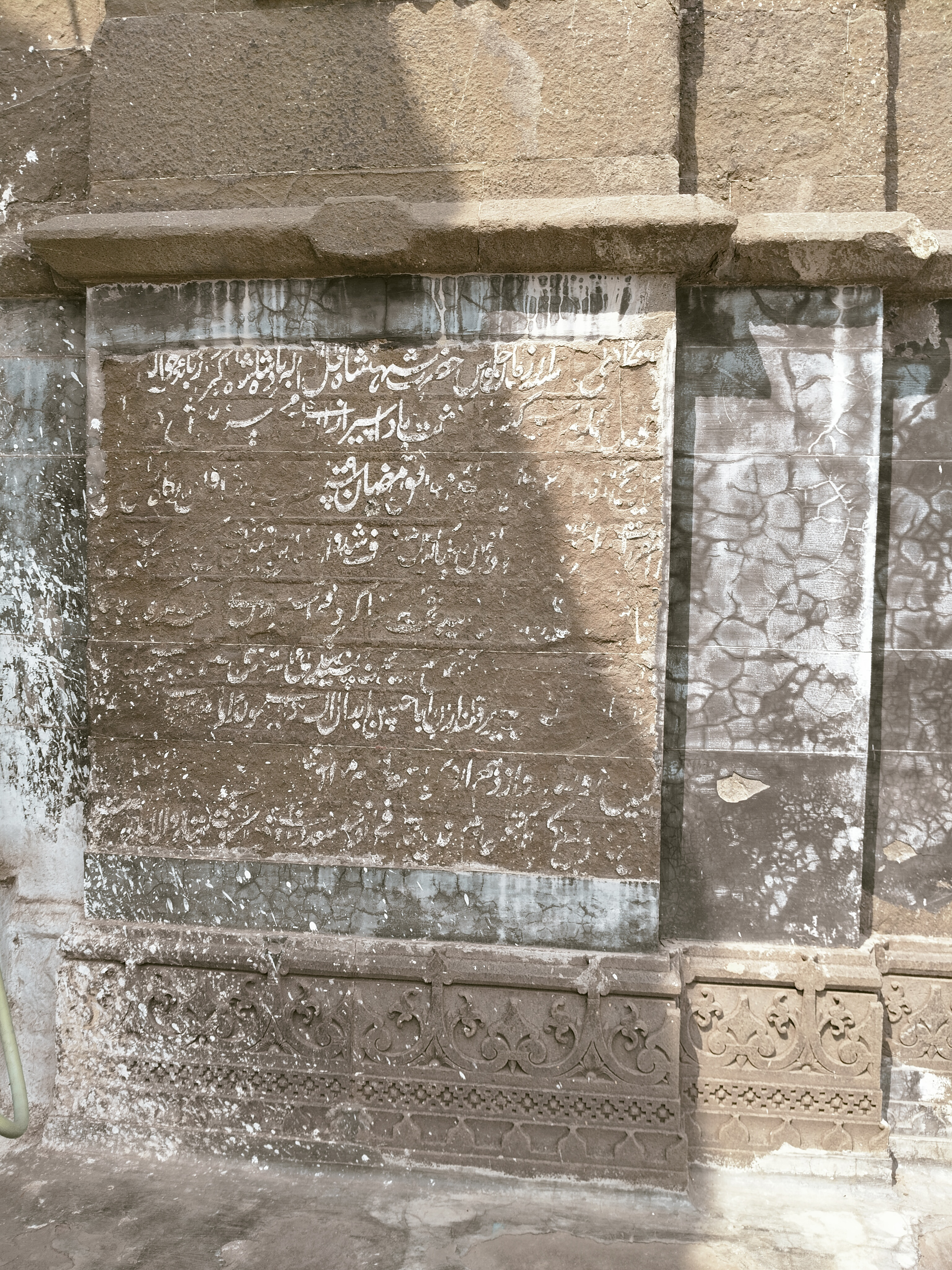
Engraved writing detailing the mosque history

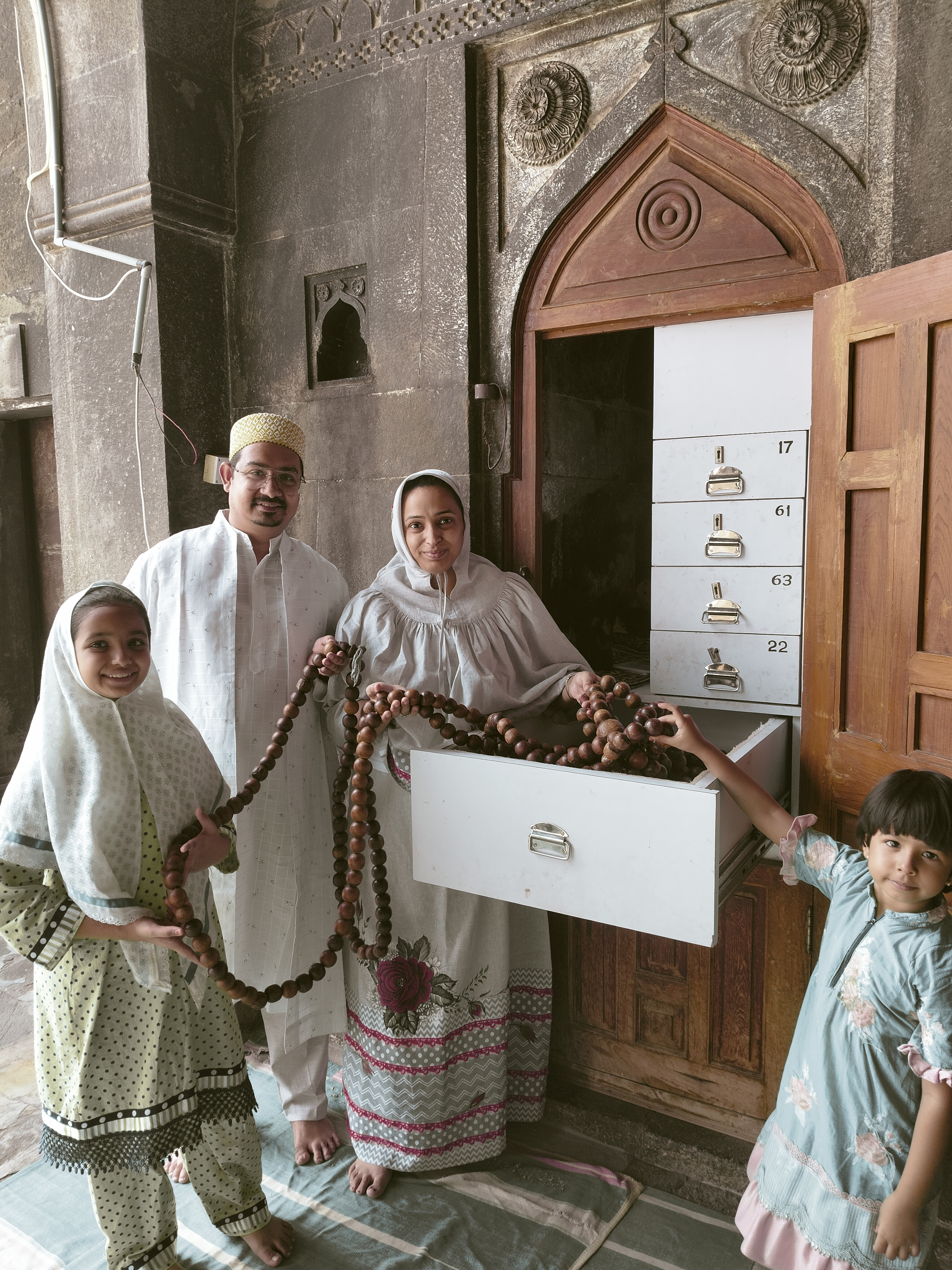
Big Tasbeeh of old Moghul era in the mosque

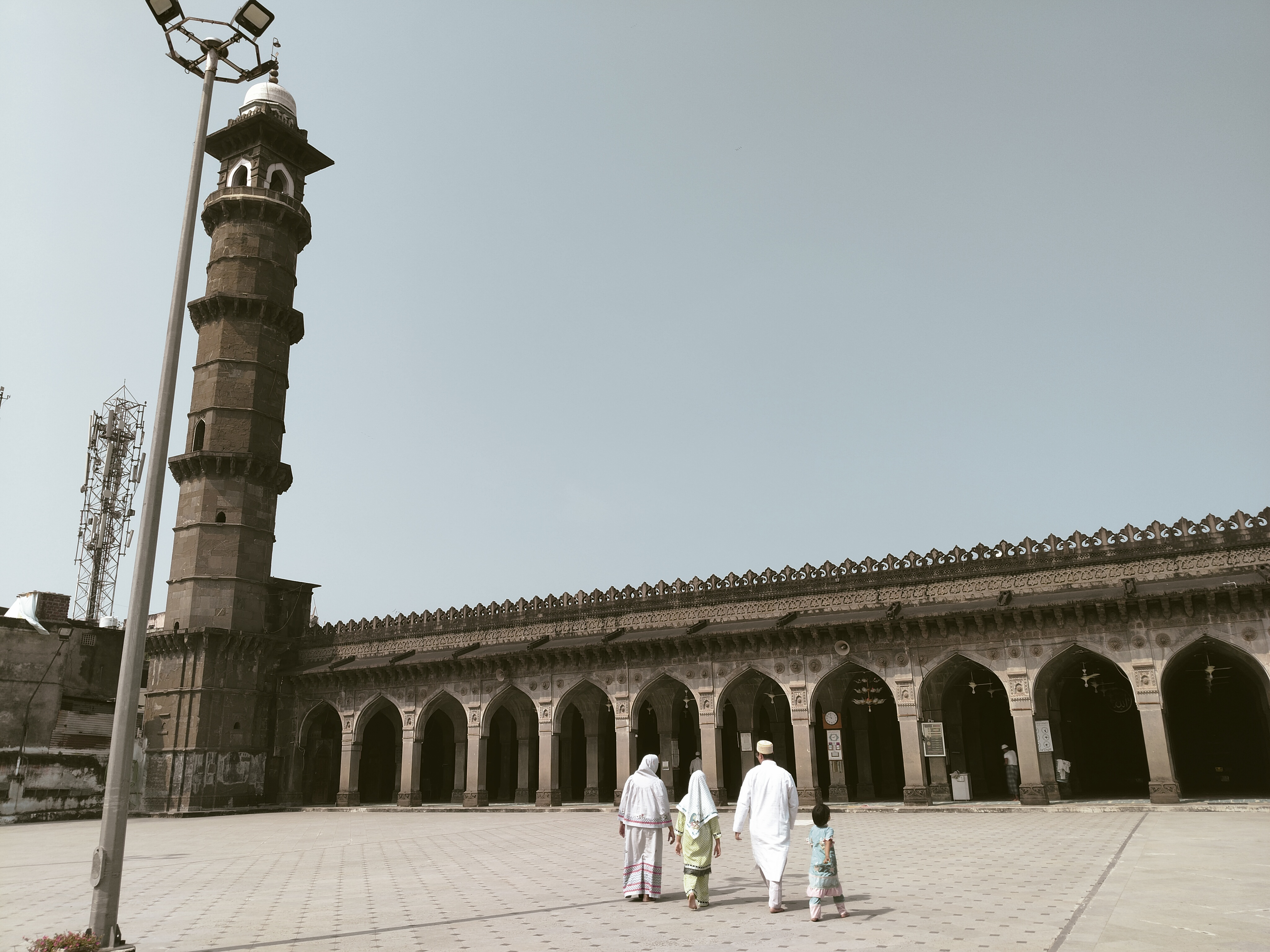
Minaret and front courtyard

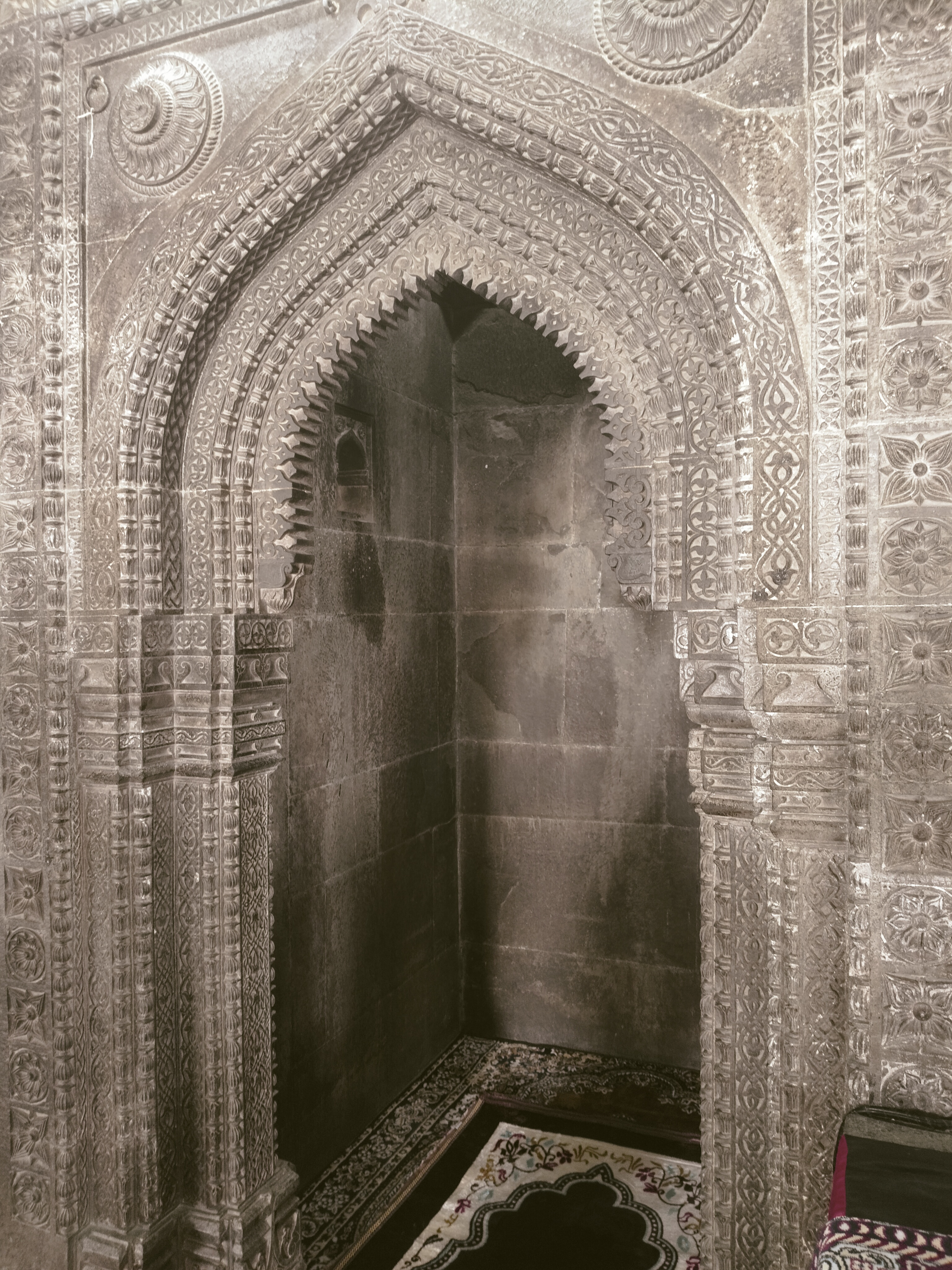
Qibla sculpture in detail

== See also ==
- Islam in India
- List of mosques in India
- List of Monuments of National Importance in Madhya Pradesh
