= Utavali River =

Utavali

Location
- Country: India
- State: Gujarat

Physical characteristics
- Source
  - location: India
- Mouth
  - location: Arabian Sea, India
- Length: 125 km (78 mi)
- Discharge
  - location: Arabian Sea

Utavali River is a river in western India in Gujarat whose origin is Kaniad hills. Its basin has a maximum length of 125 km. The total catchment area of the basin is 388 km^{2}.
