= Ambadevi rock shelters =

Caves and archaeological site in India

- Satpura-Tapti valley caves, Gavilgarh-Betul rock shelters
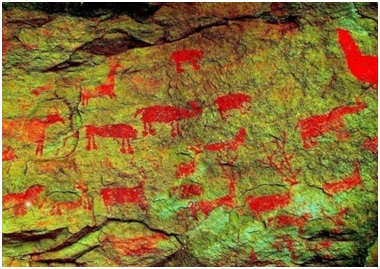
- Animal Zoo rock art

- Location of the Ambadevi rock shelters in Madhya Pradesh Ambadevi rock shelters (India)
- 21.4071°N 77.9481°E
- Type: Cultural
- Periods: Upper Paleolithic, Mesolithic, Chalcolithic, Iron Age
- Location: Betul District,
- Region: Madhya Pradesh

Site notes
- Elevation: 450 m (1,480 ft)
- Length: 6 km (3.7 mi)
- Width: 10 km (6.2 mi)

The Ambadevi rock shelters are part of an extensive cave site, where the oldest yet known traces of human life in the central province of the Indian subcontinent were discovered. The site is located in the Satpura Range of the Gawilgarh Hills in Betul District of the Indian state of Madhya Pradesh, north of Dharul village in Amravati district of Maharashtra. Studies of various rock paintings and petroglyphs present in the caves suggest, that the Ambadevi rock shelters were inhabited by prehistoric human settlers since around 25,000 years ago. First discoveries of clusters of numerous rock shelters and caves were made by Vijay Ingole and his team beginning on 27 January 2007.

Named after the nearby ancient Ambadevi Cave Temple, the site has also been referred to as the Satpura-Tapti valley caves and the Gavilgarh-Betul rock shelters. The Ambadevi rock shelters rank among the most important archaeological discoveries of the early 21st Century in India, on par with the 20th Century discovery of the Bhimbetka rock shelters.

== Location ==
The rock shelters are situated in the Betul District of the Indian state of Madhya Pradesh, around 60 km (37 mi) north of the city of Amravati. in the Vidarbha region, located on the southern slope of the Satpura-Gawilgarh hill ranges, at about 450 m (1,480 ft) above sea level. The site lies 6 km (3.7 mi) west of the Salbardi pilgrimage destination, near Morshi town, Amravati District. By 2015 an area of 10 km (6.2 mi) by 6 km (3.7 mi) had been explored. The sandstone shelters are covered by lush vegetation and bear a striking resemblance to other rock art sites in India, Australia, South Africa and France.

== Discovery ==
The previously unrecorded site was discovered by Vijay Ingole and his colleagues (Padmakar Lad, Manohar Khode, Shirish Kumar Patil, Dnyaneshwar Damahe, and Pradeep Hirurkar) on 27 January 2007. Amateur naturalists and bird watchers also explored the area until 2012. More than 100 rock shelters were identified of which at least 30 contain hundreds of pictographs, petroglyphs and stone artifacts. The settlement period of the site ranges from the Upper Paleolithic (25,000 to 15,000 BCE) to the Neolithic (10,000 to 5,000 BCE), the Chalcolithic (after 5,000 BCE) and the Iron Age (1,200 to 600 BCE). Sediment, artefact and stratigraphy studies suggest a continuous sequence of human presence during the entire period.

In 2011, further exploration was undertaken by the Archaeological Survey of India (ASI) under Sahu and her team. More than 225 rock shelters were identified that contained paintings, engravings, and stone tools. Stone tools fashioned out of a cryptocrystalline material like chert, chalcedony, or jasper were discovered in and around several shelters.

== Rock art and paintings ==
The rock shelters of Ambadevi contain hundreds of paintings and pieces of rock art. The oldest paintings are considered to be between 15,000 and 20,000 years old.

=== Pictographs ===
Most of these paintings are red in color and the pigment appears to have been prepared from hematite, red blood, fat and plants. In a few places, green, white, black and yellow pigments have been used. The paintings mainly depict animals (tortoises, fish, birds), humans, hand impressions, geometric figures, hunting scenes, war scenes, and abstract geometrical figures. Pictographs are painted on vertical wall surfaces, ceilings and hollow rock cavities. The oldest pictograph, known as Animal Zoo, depicts carnivorous mammals, such as tigers, leopards, hyenas, jackals, aardvarks (an extinct ant-eater) and wild dogs. Further paintings feature omnivores, like bears, herbivores like Nilgais, spotted deer, barasingha, sambar, the Indian rhinoceros, the now extinct sivatherium and numerous unidentifiable species.

All animal pictures face to the right. Carnivorous and omnivorous animals have distinctive thick foot pads. Herbivorous animals have no foot pads. All paintings are red with colorful bodies. The paintings are well preserved and have been well protected from monsoon rains as they faced northeast. In one shelter, wild boar, tortoises, fish, porcupines, monkeys and vultures are depicted in line drawings. another shelter includes an abstract human drawing with exaggerated male genitals (phallus and testicles) (Bhairao-an incarnation of Shiva) and in a nearby river a natural stone projection that resembles a phallus was identified to have been worshipped. This is considered to be one of the oldest places of an idolatry of the lingam. A nearby tomb-like entity covered with stones includes a painting of a human figure riding an elephant. A number of figures in the Indian Warli style were also identified, as were geometric figures and motifs colored in red and white. Several animal paintings are decorated with geometric lines.

=== Petroglyphs ===
Many rock shelters feature carvings shaped like animals, trees, humans and female genitals (vulvae). In one of the shelters an engraving of four bulls was identified on the face of the shelter. An image of a lotus flower with petals painted in a way to mimic a vulva was also found. Some petroglyphs found depict standalone humans, elephants with riders, tree, deer and a flying squirrel.

== See also ==
- Rock shelters of Madhya Pradesh
