= Rock shelters of Madhya Pradesh =

Rock shelters in India

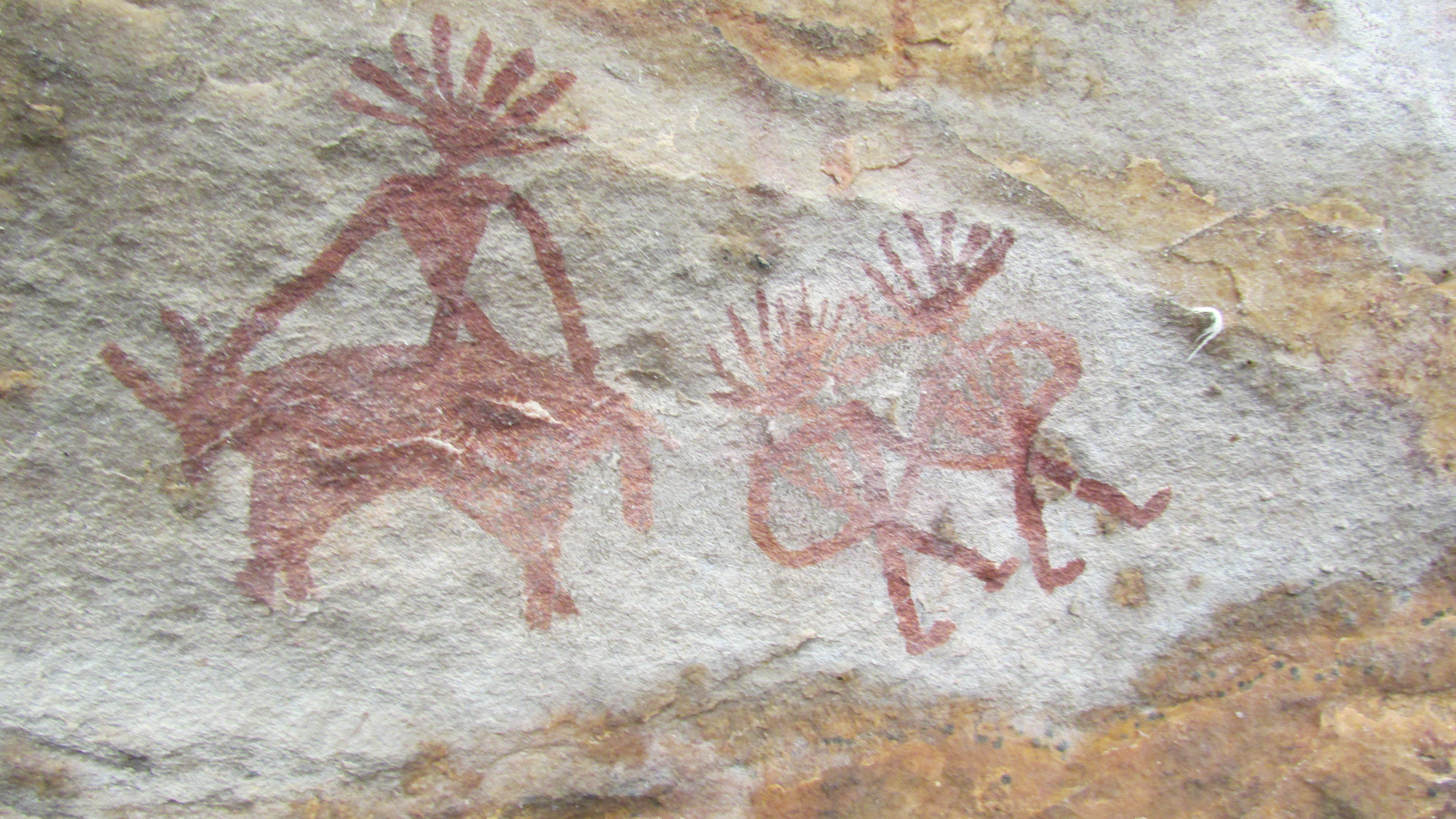
Chaturbhujnath Nala rock art

The state of Madhya Pradesh is rich in rock shelters and two-thirds of the rock shelters in India are found in the state. The Vindhya and the Satpura ranges have many rock shelter sites. These sites consist of natural caves or sheltered area under rock outcrops. Some of these rock shelter sites also have paintings and other marks of human habitation. These shelters are a record of the early human settlements in the central region of India.

== Rock shelters ==
=== Bhimbetka rock shelters ===
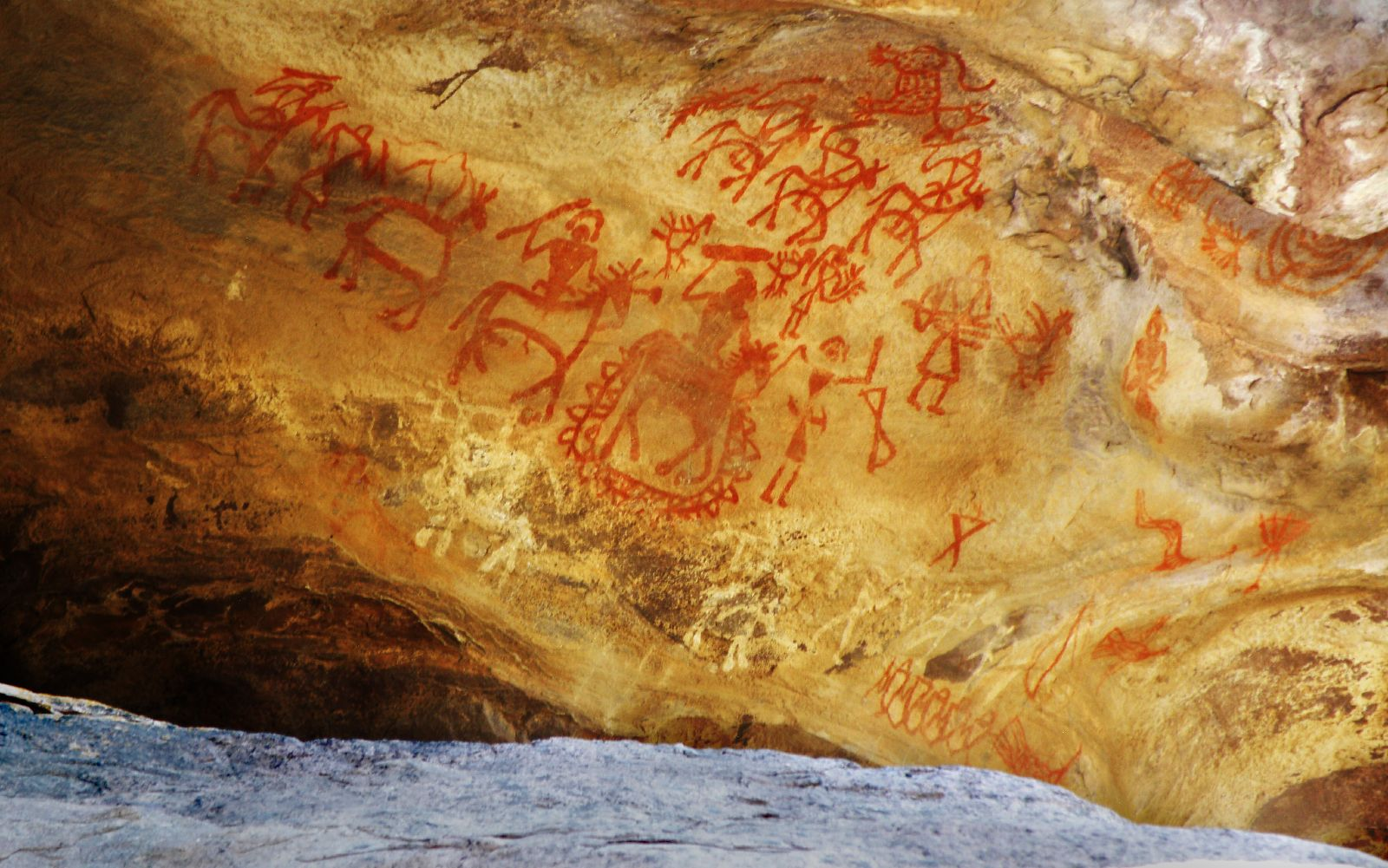
Bhimbetka Cave Paintings

The rock shelters of Bhimbetka are southeast of Bhopal in Raisen District. It is a UNESCO World Heritage Site spread over seven hills and about 750 rock shelters. Many of these caves have paintings on the walls or on the underside of rock overhangs. The paintings consist of groups of people engaged in different activities. There also many paintings of different species of animals like elephants, bison, deer etc.

These rock shelters are listed as Monuments of National Importance. N-MP-225

=== Ambadevi rock shelters ===
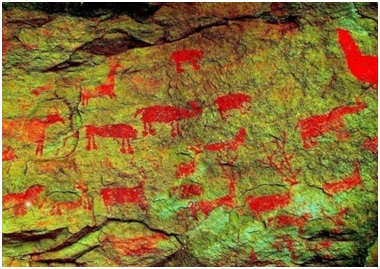
Ambadevi rock painting

The Ambadevi rock shelters are located in the Satpura Range in Betul District. This site has About 100 rock shelters. Of this 30 shelters contain hundreds of pictographs, petroglyphs and stone artifacts.

=== Adamgarh rock shelter ===
Adamgarh Hills rock shelters are located in Narmadapuram district. At the time of excavations 18 rock shelters were found of which 11 have visible paintings, others have faded with time and some due to vandalism by tourists.The paintings are simple without any details or proportions.Paintings are of battle scenes, riders on horse-back, soldiers with bows and arrows, quiver and scabbard. Some paintings are of animals like oxen, monkeys, horses, fish, peacocks, and in one case a giraffe. These rock shelters are listed as Monuments of National Importance. N-MP-151

=== Dorothy deep Rock Shelter ===
Pachmarhi hills in Narmadapuram district have many rock shelters at various locations. These shelters also have paintings in them. These rock shelters are listed as Monuments of National Importance. N-MP-153

=== Rock Shelters Barhat ===
Rock Shelters with megaliths, and cave paintings and inscriptions are located at Barhat Deur Kothar in Rewa district There are 63 rock shelters with rock paintings. These rock shelters are listed as Monuments of National Importance.N-MP-230

=== Saru Maru Caves ===
The Saru Maru site is located near the village of Pan Guradia in Sehore District. There are as many as forty-five rock shelters distributed between Shahganj and Pan Guradia, an area of about 40 km long located north of Narmada. Some of these shelters have paintings of hunting scenes and horse-riders. There are later period Buddhist remains and broken Stupas at the site. These rock shelters are listed as Monuments of National Importance. N-MP-267

=== Talpura rock shelters ===
Talpura in Sehore district is an ancient rock shelters site overlooking the Narmada River. In all 5 rock shelters have been found with paintings of animals.

These rock shelters are listed as Monuments of National Importance. N-MP-268

=== Chatarbhuj Nala rock shelters ===
The rock shelters called Chaturbhujnath Nala stretch over the 5 km long trail with thousands of ancient rock paintings on the wall; Situated within the Gandhi Sagar Sanctuary near Bhanpura in Mandsaur district. This site has thousands of paintings celebrating their daily life.These rock shelters are listed as Monuments of National Importance. N-MP-291

Nearby is a hill known as "Dar Ki Chattan" The site features almost 560 man-made cupules marked on the walls. It is supposed to be the earliest efforts of artistic expression by the human. Other nearby rock-art sites are Chiber Nala, Sita Khardi and Modi

=== Rock Shelters at Sita Khardi ===
These rock shelters with paintings are also located in the Gandhi Sagar Sanctuary near Bhanpura in Mandsaur district.These rock shelters are listed as Monuments of National Importance. N-MP-292

=== Pournkadanta, Painted rock shelter ===
This rock shelter is located near Dewra village in Chhatarpur District.These rock shelters are listed as State Protected Monument. S-MP-52

=== Putlikadanta, Painted rockshelter ===
This rock shelter is located adjacent to Pournkadanta rock shelter near Dewra village in Chhatarpur District. These rock shelters are listed as State Protected Monument. S-MP-53

=== Others ===
Some other State Protected Monuments

- S-MP-126 Painted Rock- shelters, Nos. 1 to 15 Jhinghari Katni
- S-MP-240 Painted Rock- shelter Gaura Mountain Beechhee Sidhi
- S-MP-243 Painted Rock- Shelter (Rani Machi) Sidhi
- S-MP-244 Painted Rock- Shelter Beechhee Dholagiri Sidhi

In addition National Mission on Monuments and Antiquities lists following sites.

- Nagori Group of Rock shelters and other remains
- Sanchi- Kanakheda Rock shelters behind the Sanchi hill
- Rock shelters at Satkunda
- Ramchhajja group of rock shelters
- Group of rock shelters at Kharwai
- Painted rock shelters and other remains at Kulhariya
- Painted rock shelters and other remains Barjorpur

and many more.
