= Pahargarh Caves =

Archaeological site in India

Coordinates: 26.211°N 77.769°E

The Pahargarh Caves are a cave complex containing prehistoric paintings in Madhya Pradesh, India, near the village of Pahargarh, 58 km southwest of Morena. The most prominent of the caves is known locally as Likhichhaj.

The paintings were discovered in 1979 by D. P. S. Dwarikesh, a professor of linguistics at the University of Michigan, and Shri Ram Sharma, a civil engineer from Pahargarh. Dwarikesh and Sharma conducted preliminary surveys of the caves, documenting over 600 paintings, and speculated that there were thousands more. However, they were not able to obtain permission to excavate and the caves have not been investigated since.

Made with red and white ochre-based paints, the depictions include human and animal figures as well as abstract shapes. The dating of the paintings is uncertain. According to Dwarikesh, ostrich egg shells discovered in the caves were radiocarbon dated to 25,000 years ago, but they also discovered Iron Age artefacts dating to ca. 1500 BCE and the paintings themselves depict tools consistent with a date of 600 BCE.

== See also ==
- Cave paintings in India
- Anangpur Caves (Faridabad)
- Bhimbetka rock shelters (Bhopal)
- Mangar Bani Caves (Gurugram)
