= Anangpur =

Village in Haryana, India

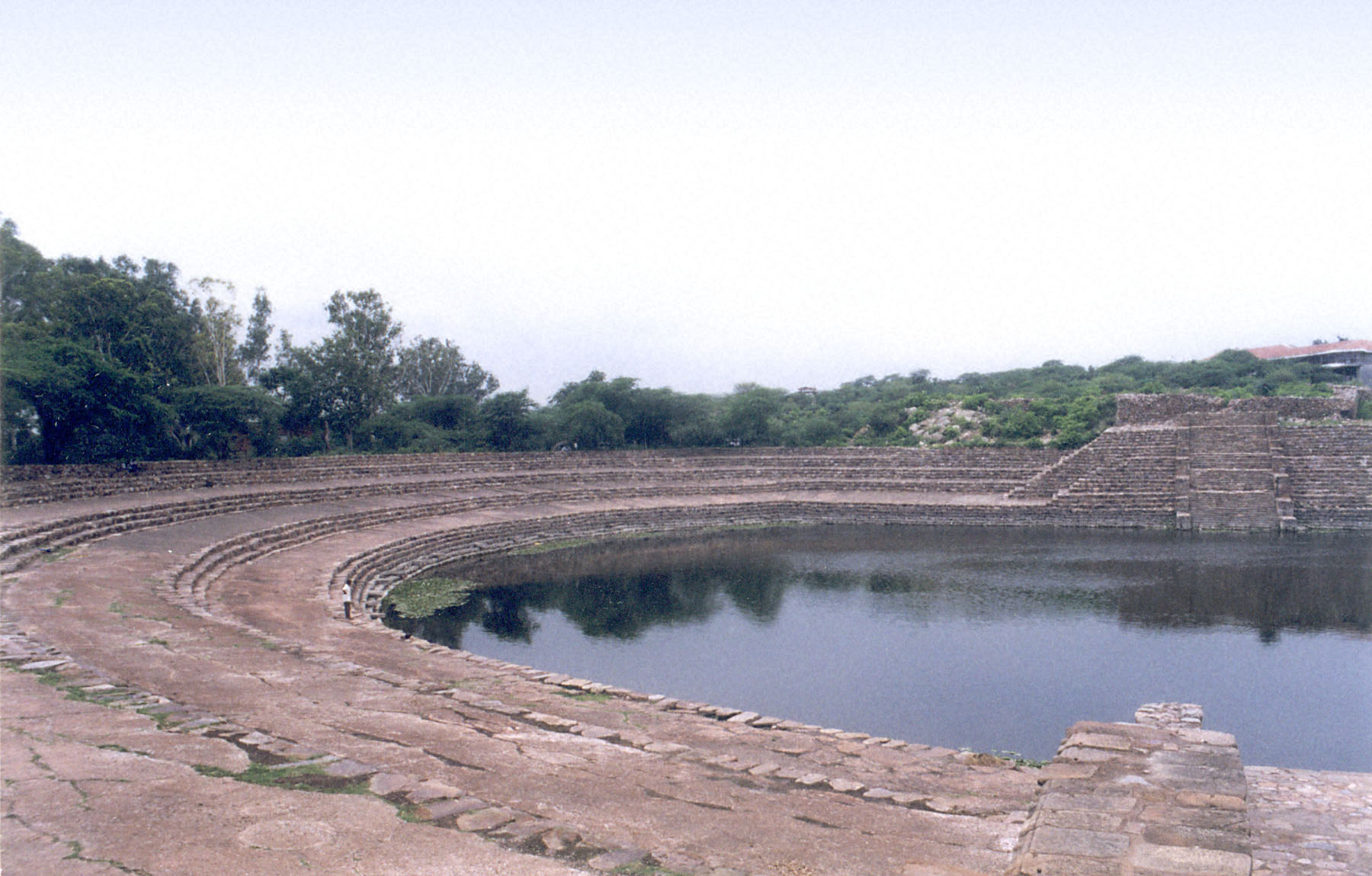
- Suraj Kund built by Tomara kings

- Location in Haryana, India, Asia Anangpur (India)
- 28.4612°N 77.2847°E
- Location: Faridabad district, Haryana, India

Anangpur is a historical village located near Faridabad in Haryana, India. Anangpur forms a geographical triangle along with Mehrauli and Tugluqabad. Anangpur was one of the settlements of the Tomar Rajputs under Anangpal Tomar who had built the fort and monuments here.

== History ==
=== Tomara dynasty (8th - 11th century CE) ===
Anangpal I, first king of Tomara dynasty (c.736- 1052 CE), declared himself an independent ruler and established the Tomara dynasty of Delhi in the early 8th century. He built his capital in this village and expanded his kingdom from there. He is said to have built numerous palaces and temples during his reign, the majority of which are diminished now. Last king of this dynasty was Anangpal (Anangpal II), who had built Delhi's Lal Kot, which was later renovated by Chauhan ruler and also came to be known as the Qila Rai Pithora. Tomara dynasty were overthrown by Chahamanas of Shakambhari, last Chahamana or Chauhan king was Prithviraj Chauhan, Qila Rai Pithora (earlier called Lal Kot) is named after him.

The capital of Tanwar changed a few times during the course of 457 years they ruled in the northern India. The first capital of the Tomar empire was Anangpur while the last one was Dhillikapuri (Delhi, Lal Kot).

=== Chauhan dynasty (12th century CE) ===
The Tomara's rule was followed by that of the Chahamanas and Shihab ad-Din.

== Paleolithic sites (100,000 BP) ==
=== Group of 43 sites ===
The Anangpur group of paleolithic sites (AGPS), discovered In 1986, is a cluster of 43 prehistoric sites with rock art (paintings) in the area of historic Anangpur village, Mangar Bani Paleolithic site found in 2021 might be an extension of Anangpur sites.

In the forested area where the Surajkund and the Anagpur Dam are located, ancient Stone Age relics have been found which are microliths (stone tools) belonging to the Lower Paleolithic era. From a study of the prehistoric findings along the ridges of Surajkund reservoir, Anagpur Dam, and around Delhi and adjoining parts of Haryana, it has been inferred that the southern hilly area of Delhi and Haryana was environmentally suited for pre-historic man to settle here.

==== List of sites ====
These were found at 43 sites from Ankhir (a village 17 km east of Mangar Bani) in south to north along the Anangpur-Angnpur Dam-Surajkund-Tughlaqabad axis. These sites are on the 'Tughlaqabad-Surajkund Road' and south of 'Surajkund-Faridabad Road', on Anangpur hills, and on Ankhir hill, and on the road embracing the low ridge from Faridabad (Ankhir) to Surajkund. These sites include Ankhir, Anangpur, Anangpur Dam, Shilakhari, Mangar Bani, Dhauj, Kot, Nurpur, Dhumaspur, Surajkund, etc.

One of these sites is at Kot village, northeast of Sohna and southwest of Dhauj, where prehistoric paintings on stones and tools, such as chisel, have been found. Haryana surveyed the site in 2021, and ASI surveyed and photographed the site in June 2023.

=== Protected status ===
As of 31 July 2021, Head of HAD, Ashok Khemka, informed that proposal to notify this entire area as protected archaeological site has been sent by Haryana Archaeological Dept (HAD) to Govt of Haryana (GoH), and HAD is awaiting gazette notification by the GoH after which this site will become legally protected. Meanwhile, district land and revenue administration of Faridabad was undertaking ground truthing exercise, to verify the data, to ascertain the landscape and confirm the type and ownership of the land, which will be sent to HAD to help with attainment of protected status and consequent conservation.

=== Conservation ===
Khemka asserted that HAD will engage National Research Laboratory for Conservation of Cultural Property (NRLC) Lucknow, Birbal Sahni Institute of Palaeosciences (BSIP) Lucknow, Physical Research Laboratory (PRL) Ahmedabad for conservation of rockart and paintings. Khemka asserted that the whole area will be extensively surveyed to find any additional sites, entire area of Delhi South Ridge of Aravali in Haryana between Gurugram and Faridabad will be mapped and each site will be GPS tagged. Large scale scientific excavations, scientific dating of paintings and excavated sediments will be undertaken.

=== Other similar sites ===
Misolithic sites with tools, cave art and paintings are Anangpur Caves and Mangar Bani Caves (Gurugram) in Delhi NCR, Bhimbetka rock shelters (Bhopal) and Pahargarh Caves (Morena) in Madhya Pradesh.

== Tomara monuments (8th-11th century CE) ==
Tomara dynasty ruled from here, they made Anangpur as their capital and constructed several monuments here.

- Capital forts/palaces in Delhi, oldest first
  - Purana Qila, earliest Hindu rulers
    - Indraprastha, earlier than 1000 BCE
    - Edicts & additions by Ashoka the Great (r. 268 to 232 BCE) of Maurya Empire
  - Anangpur, by Anangpal I of Tomara dynasty (r. 736-1152 CE)
  - Qila Rai Pithora,
    - Lal Kot, by Tomara dynasty (1152-1177 CE) as capital
    - Qila Rai Pithora, Lal Kot expended by Prithviraj Chauhan (also called Rai Pithora, r. 1177–92 CE) of Chauhan dynasty
  - Siri Fort, by Alauddin Khalji (r. 1296–1316), second ruler of Khalji Dynasty
  - Tughlaqabad Fort, by Ghiyassudin Tughluq (r. 1320-25 CE) of Tughluq dynasty
  - Feroz Shah Kotla, by Feroz Shah Tughluq (r. 1351-88 CE) of Tughluq dynasty
  - Salimgarh Fort, in 1546 CE by Salim Shah Suri (r. 1545-54 CE), son of Sher Shah Suri
  - Red fort, built in 1639-48 CE by Mughal emperor Shah Jahan when he moved his capital from Agra to Delhi
  - Rashtrapati Bhavan, built in 1912-29 by colonial British raj

=== Anangpur Dam (8th century CE) ===
Anangpur Dam is an Indian hydraulic engineering structure built during his reign and the ruins of a fortification can also be seen around it. Surajkund, a large masonry tank, can be found in this area dating from the 9th century and was used to collect water from the Anangpur Dam and the surrounding areal.

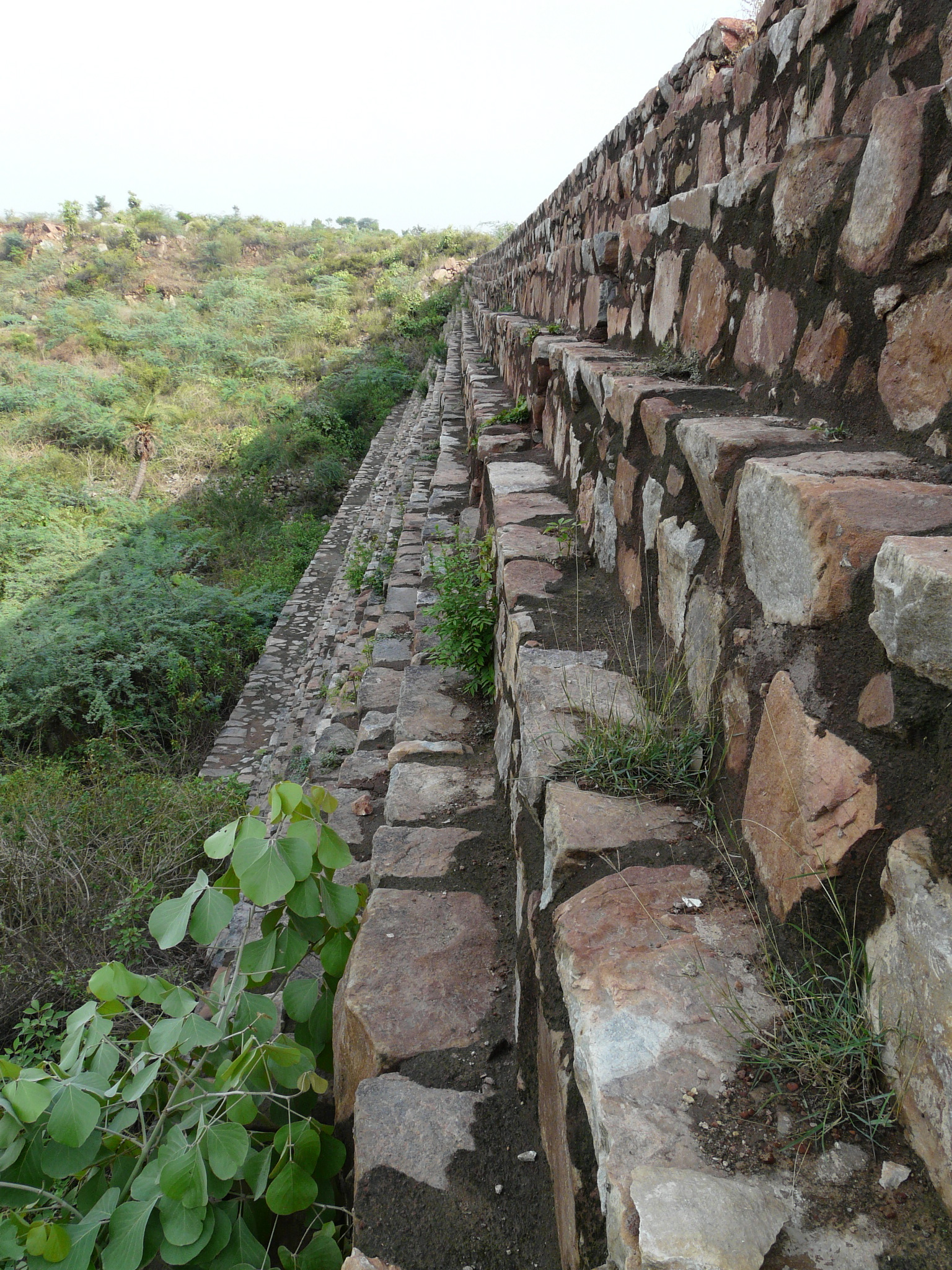
Downstream view of the dam.

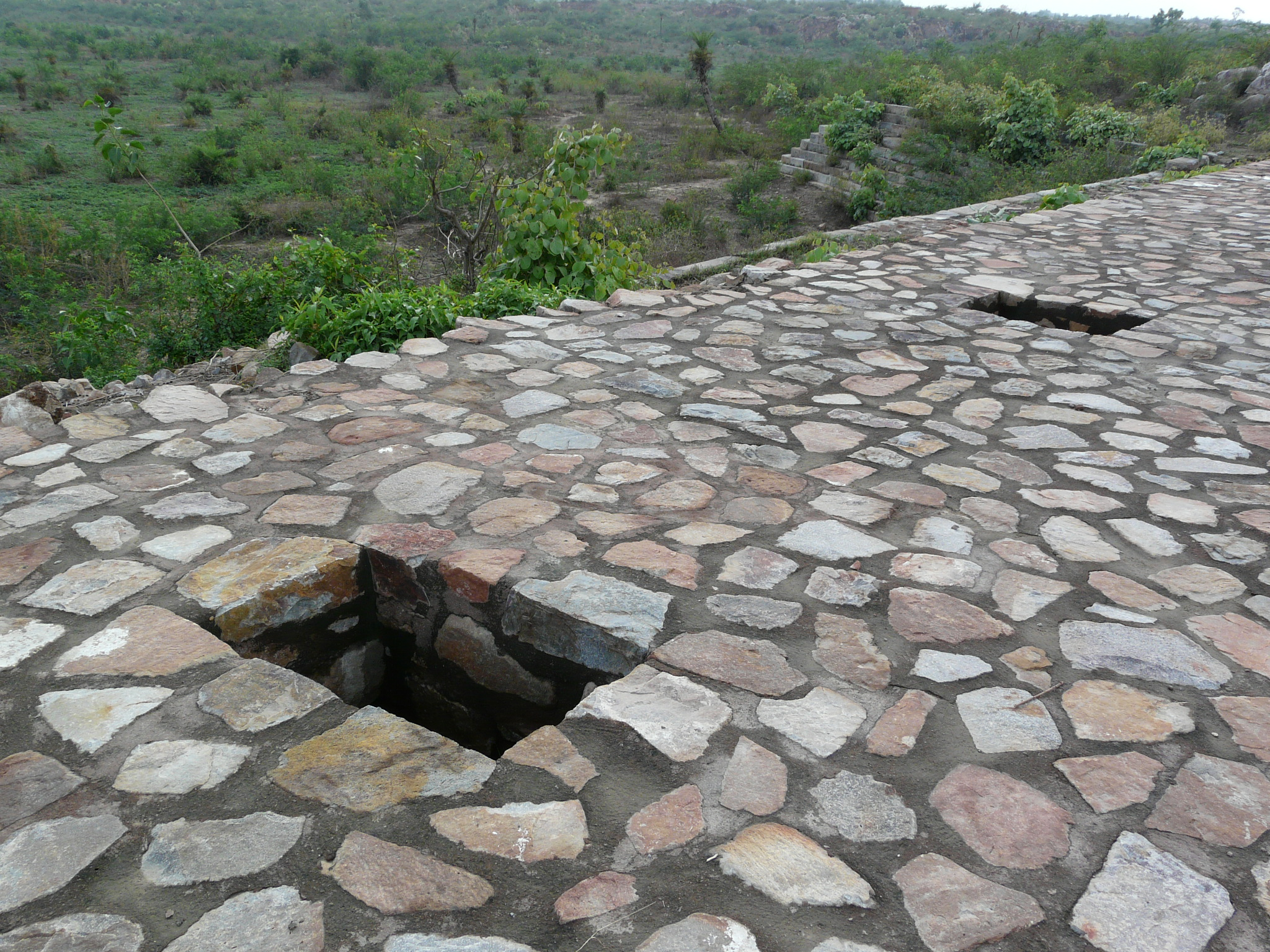
Top view of the dam, entry holes dam of the gallery inside the dam wall.

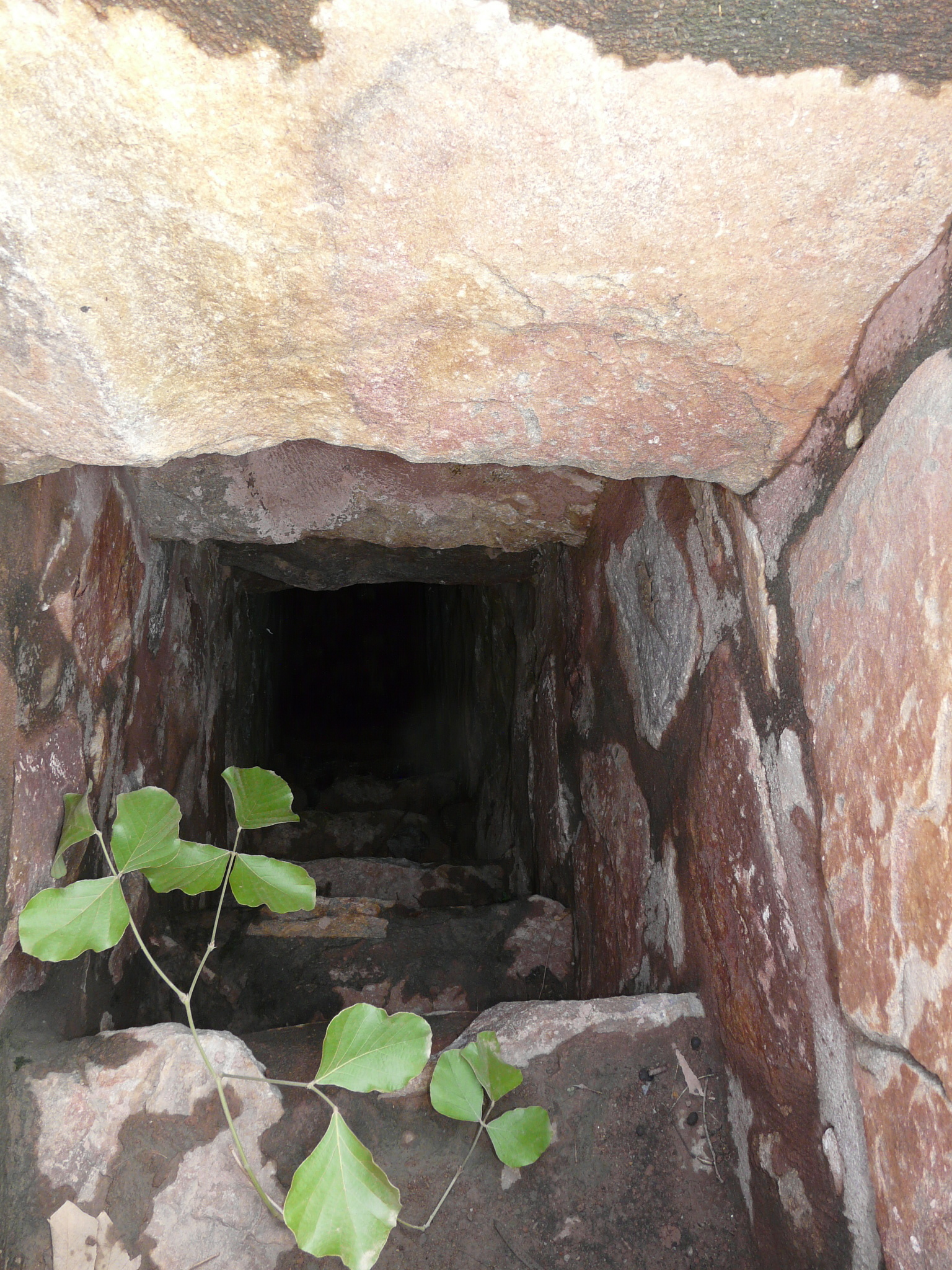
Top view of the dam, steps into the gallery inside the dam.

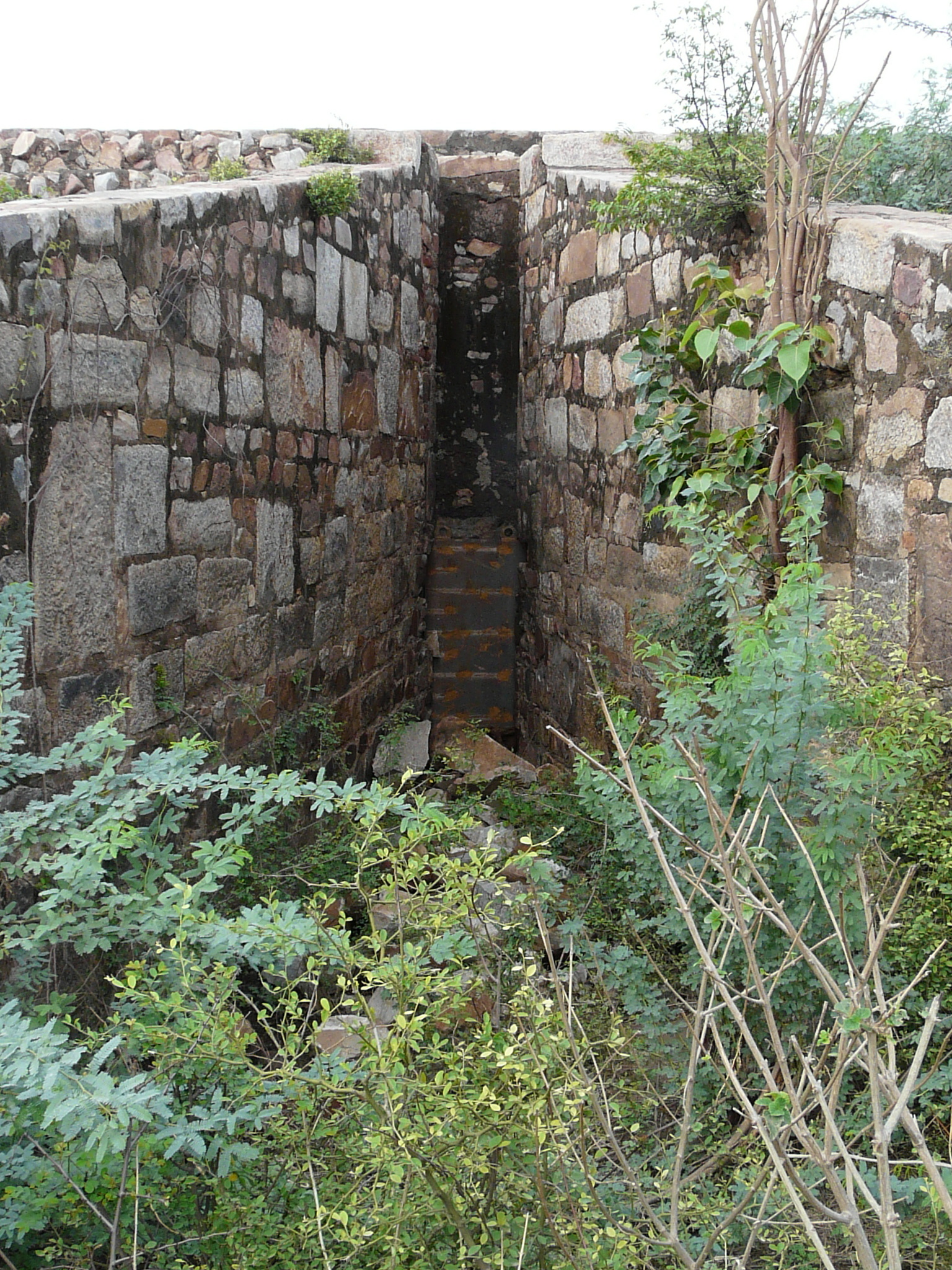
Sluice inlet in the dam - on upstream side of the dam while looking from upstream towards downstream.

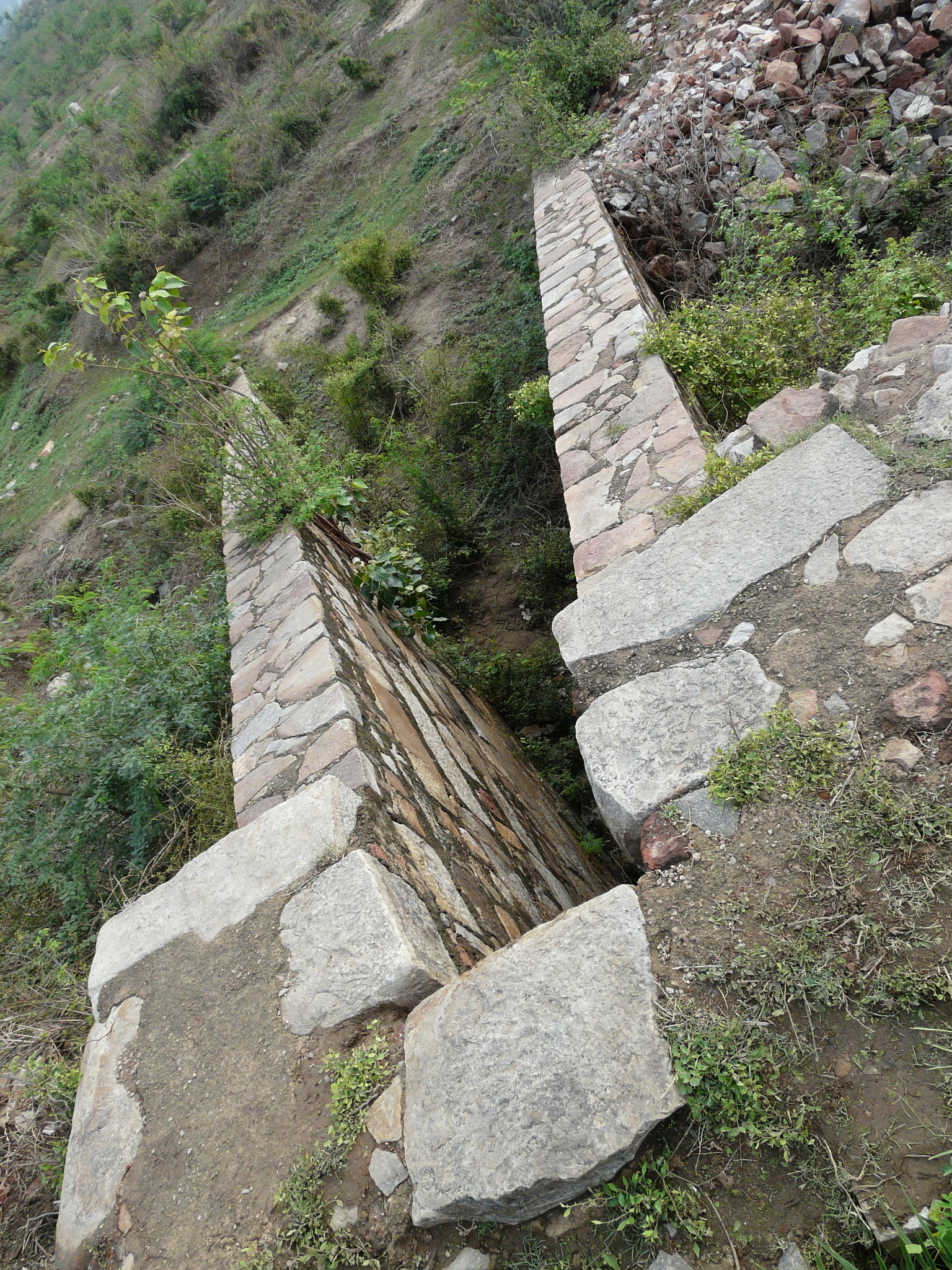
Sluice outlet from the dam - on upstream side of the dam while looking from downstream side towards upstream.

=== Surajkund ===
Surajkund, a 10th century reservoir on Southern Delhi Ridge of Aravalli Range in Faridabad, was built by the king Surajpal of the Tomara dynasty in the 10th century. Surajpal Tomar, a younger son of Anangpal Tomar - the ruler of Delhi, was a sun worshipper and he had therefore built a Sun temple on its western bank.

Surajkund is known for its annual fair Surajkund International Craft Mela, 2015 edition of this fair was visited by 1.2 million visitors including 160,000 foreigners with more than 20 countries participating in it.

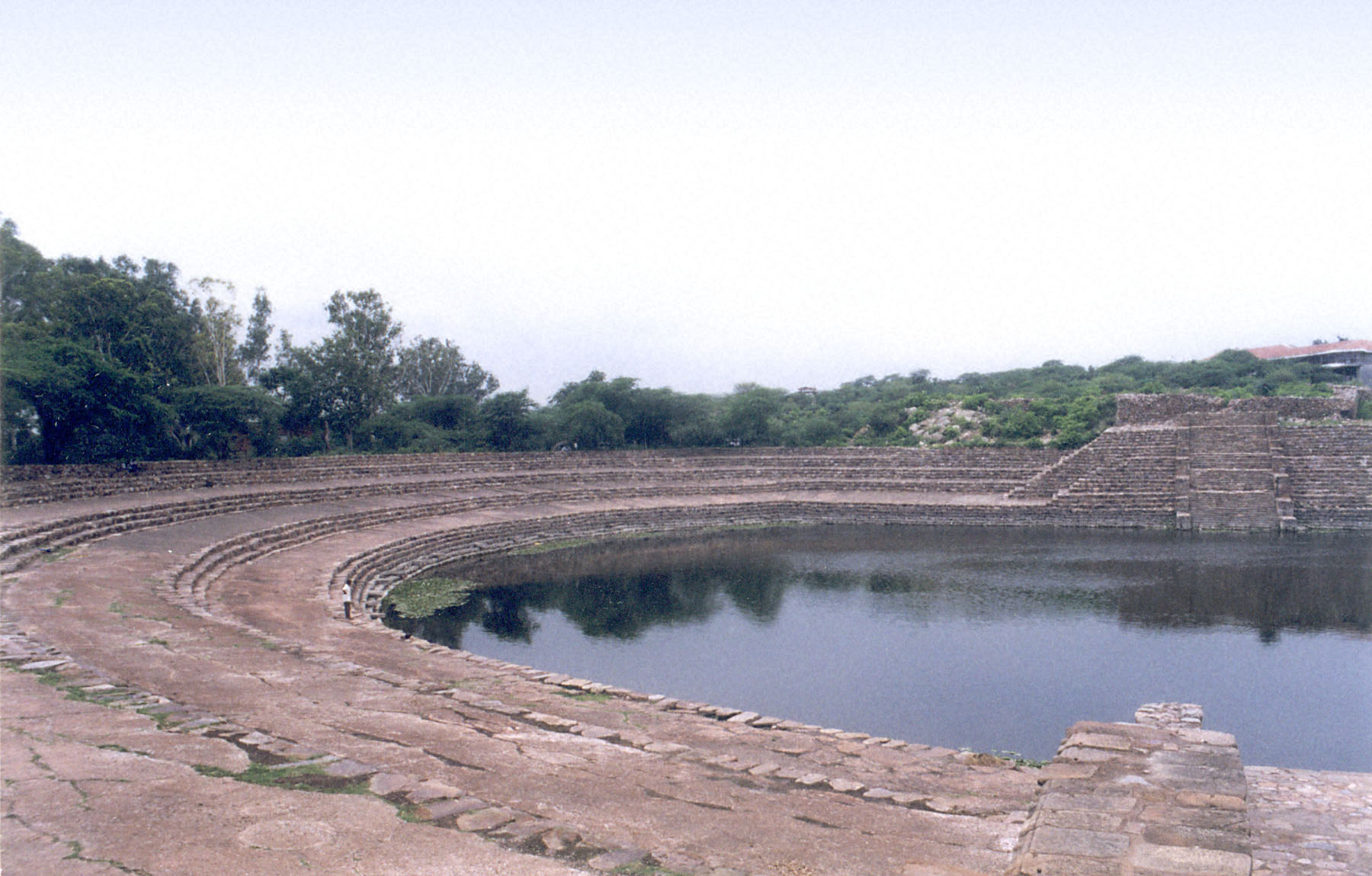
Suraj Kund panorama.

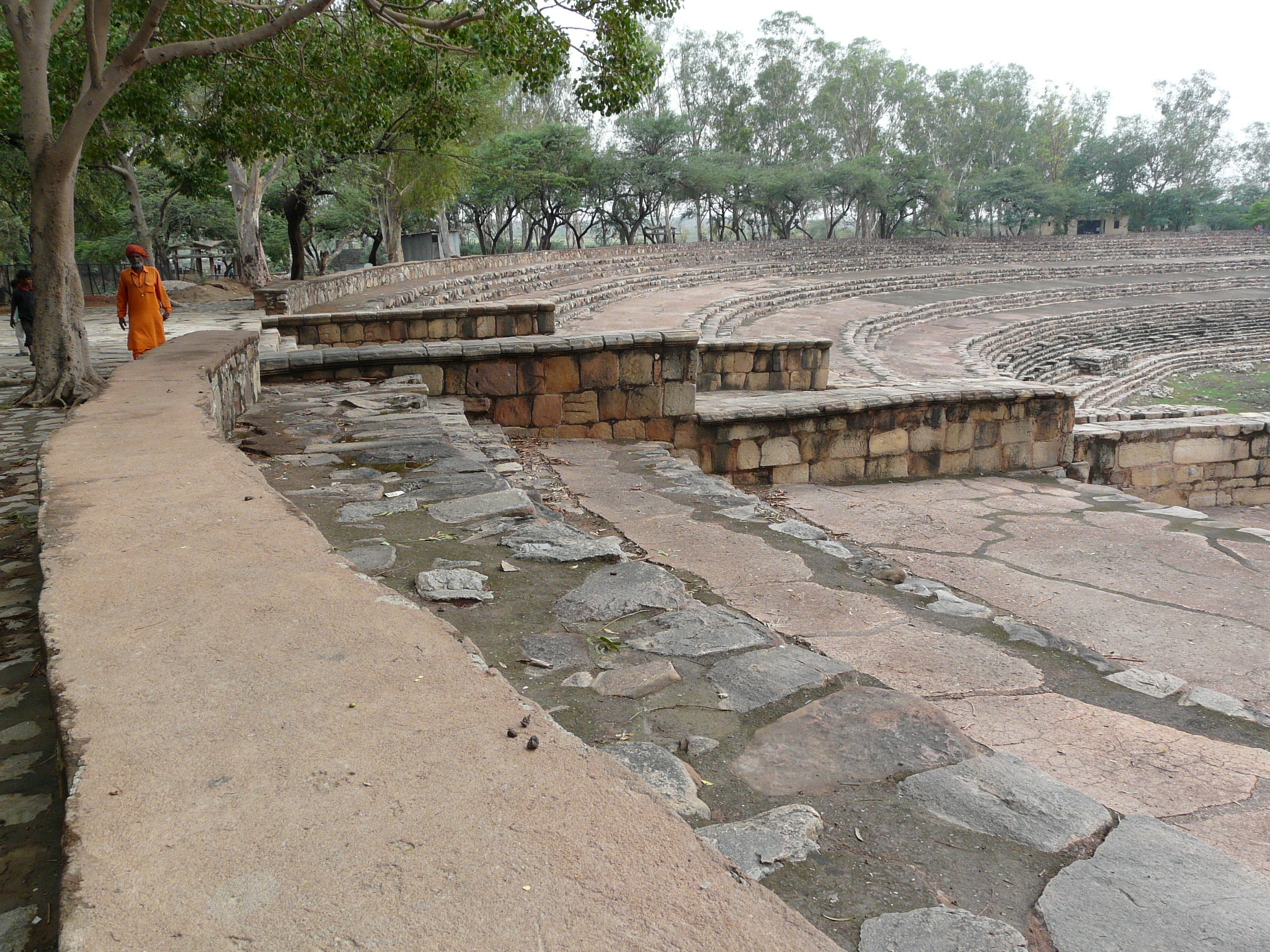
Suraj Kund - view.

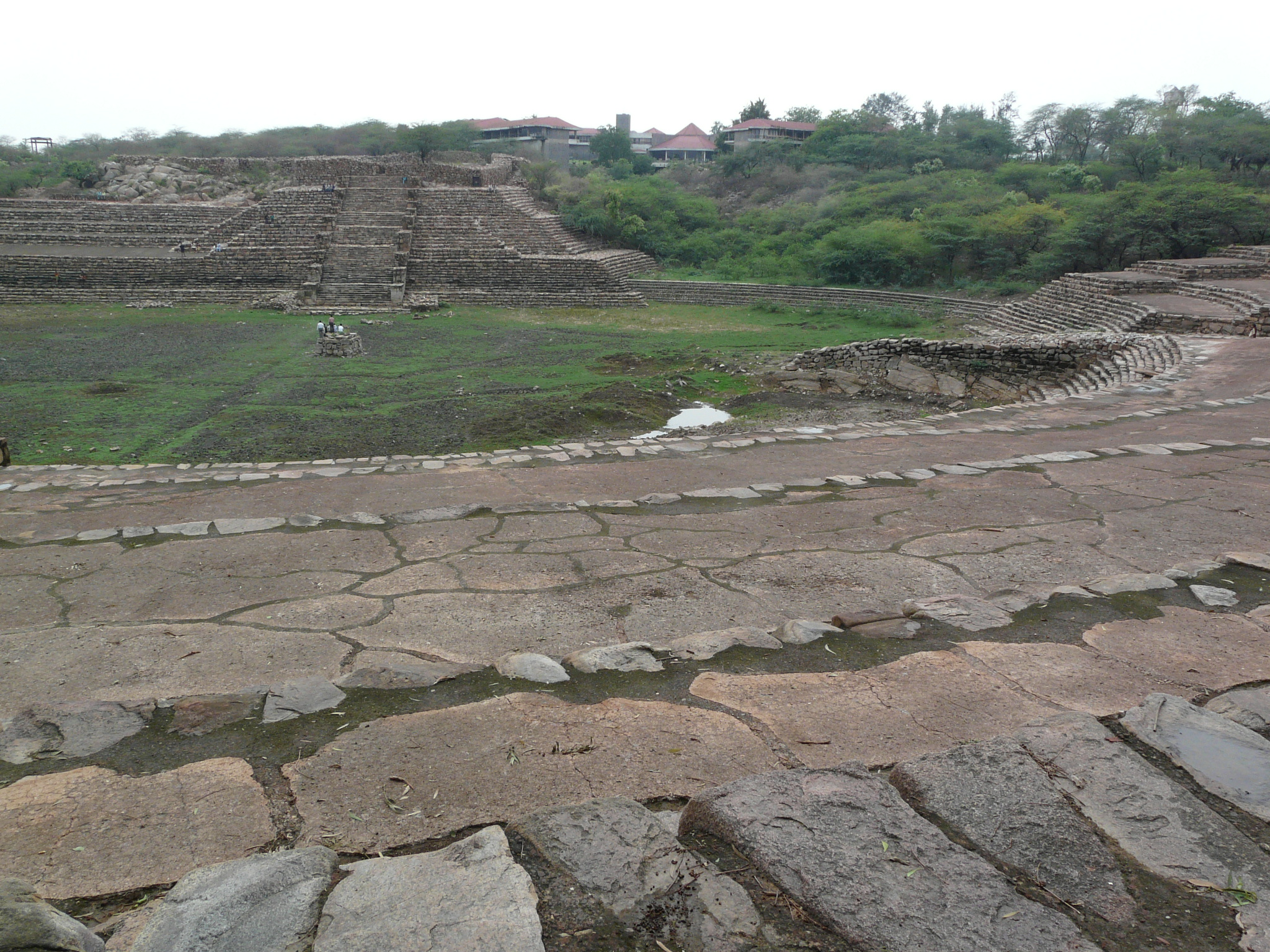
Suraj Kund - another view.

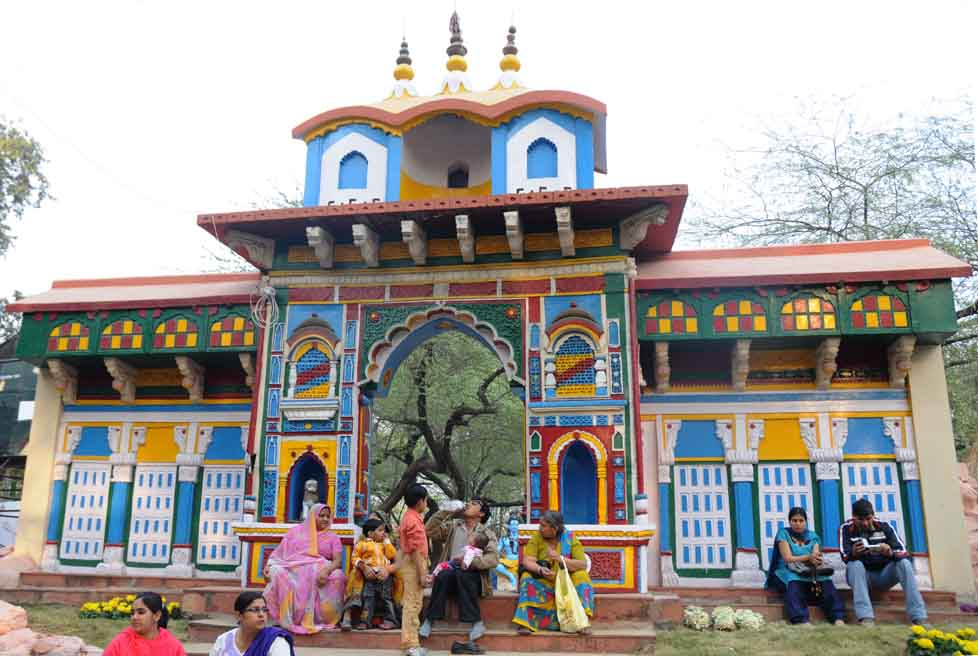
Surajkund International Crafts Fair

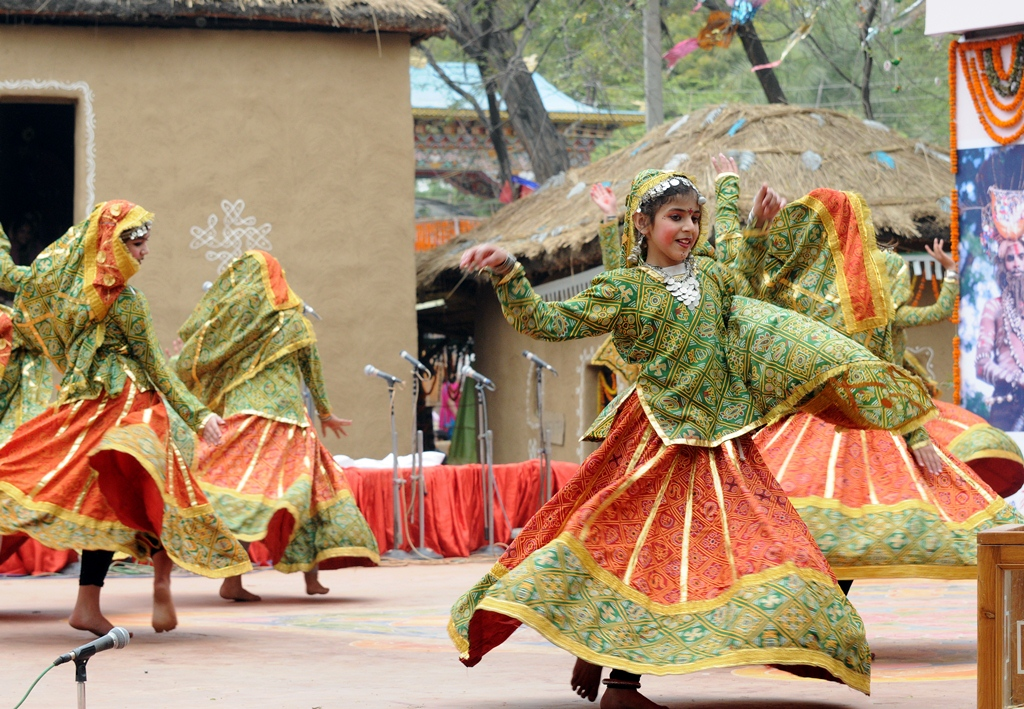
Rakasthani folk dance at Surajkund International Crafts Fair

== Present day Anangpur village ==
=== Administration and demography ===
Present Anangpur (Postal Index Number 121003) has a population of around 30000+ people, an area of 10.55 square kilometers, and a population density of 3332 per Kilometer square.

=== Hari Parbat Mandir ===
Anangpur has a replica of the temple of Mata Sharika Chakreshwar Hari Parbat Srinagar. Hari Parbat Mandir Anangpur is situated at one of the hillocks adjoining the Anangpur village. The temple was built with the contribution of Padma Shri Jagan Nath Kaul, who was the President of the Kashmiri Sewak Samaj, Faridabad and All India Kashmiri Samaj. The temple 'Hari Parbat' Anangpur is a place where 'Kashmiri Pandits' in and around Delhi observe their 'Nav Reh' festival.

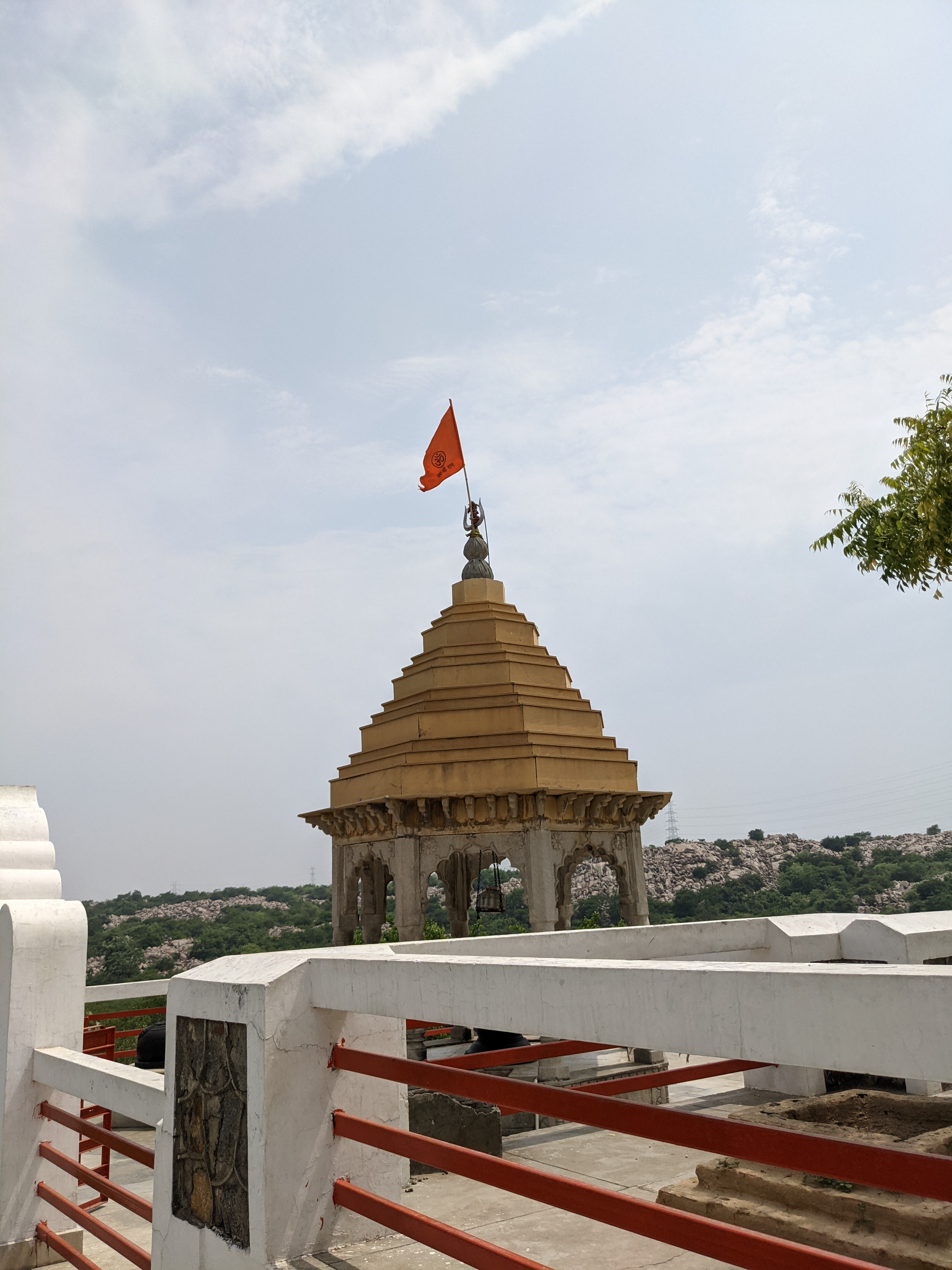
Sharika Devi temple, Hari Parbat Anangpur.

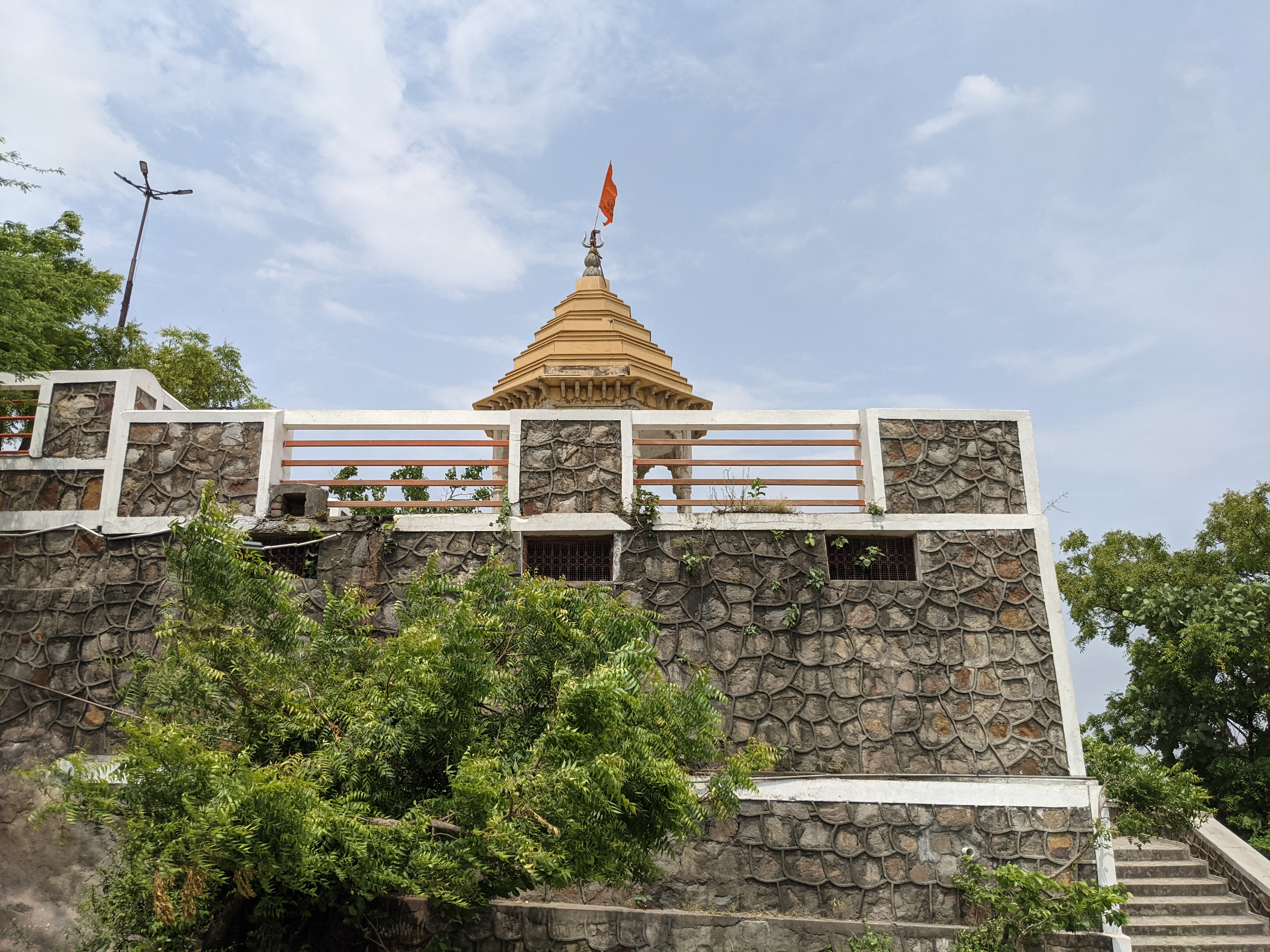
Hari Parbat Anangpur Faridabad.

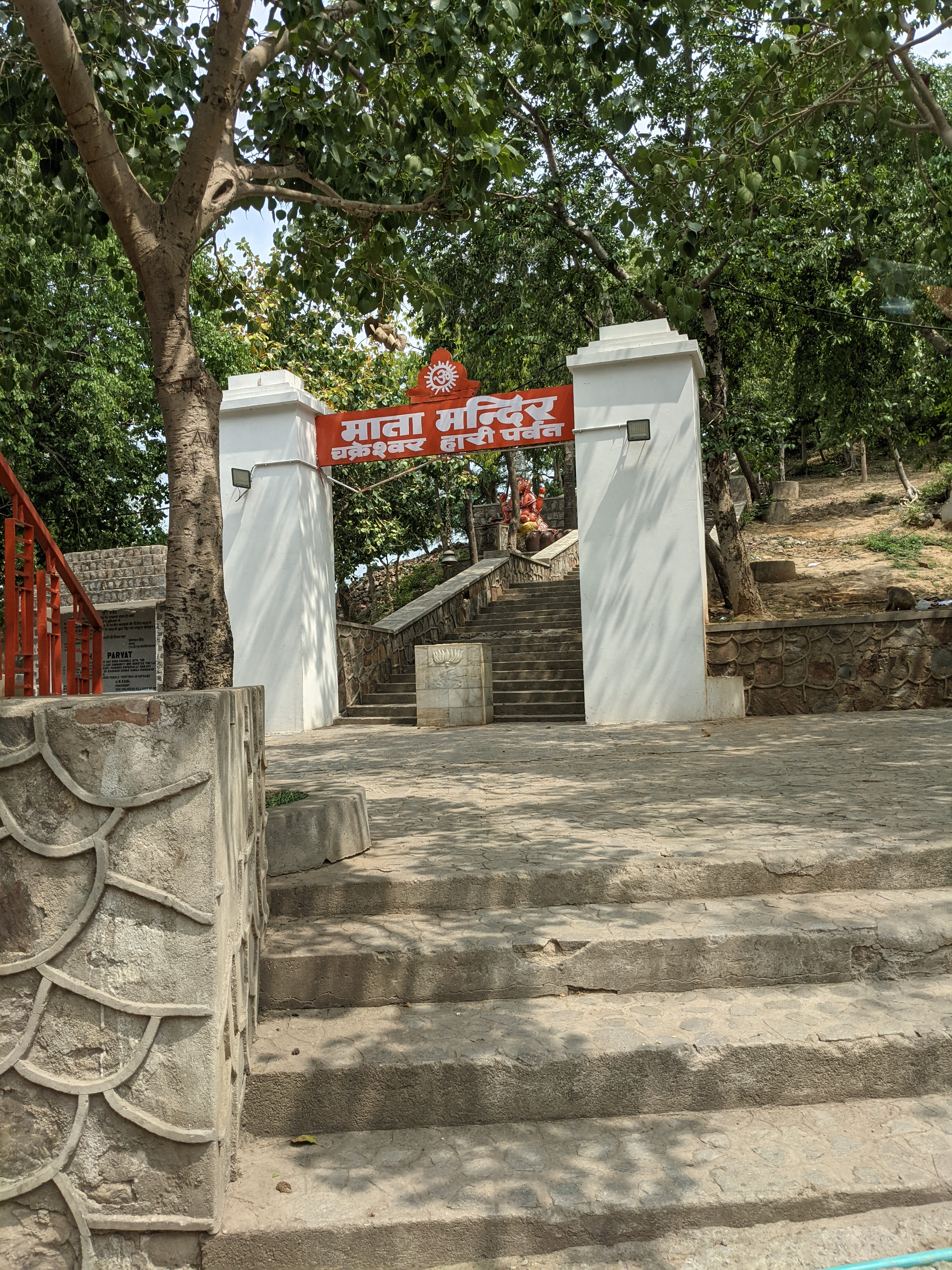
Mata temple Hari Parbat Anangpur Faridabad.

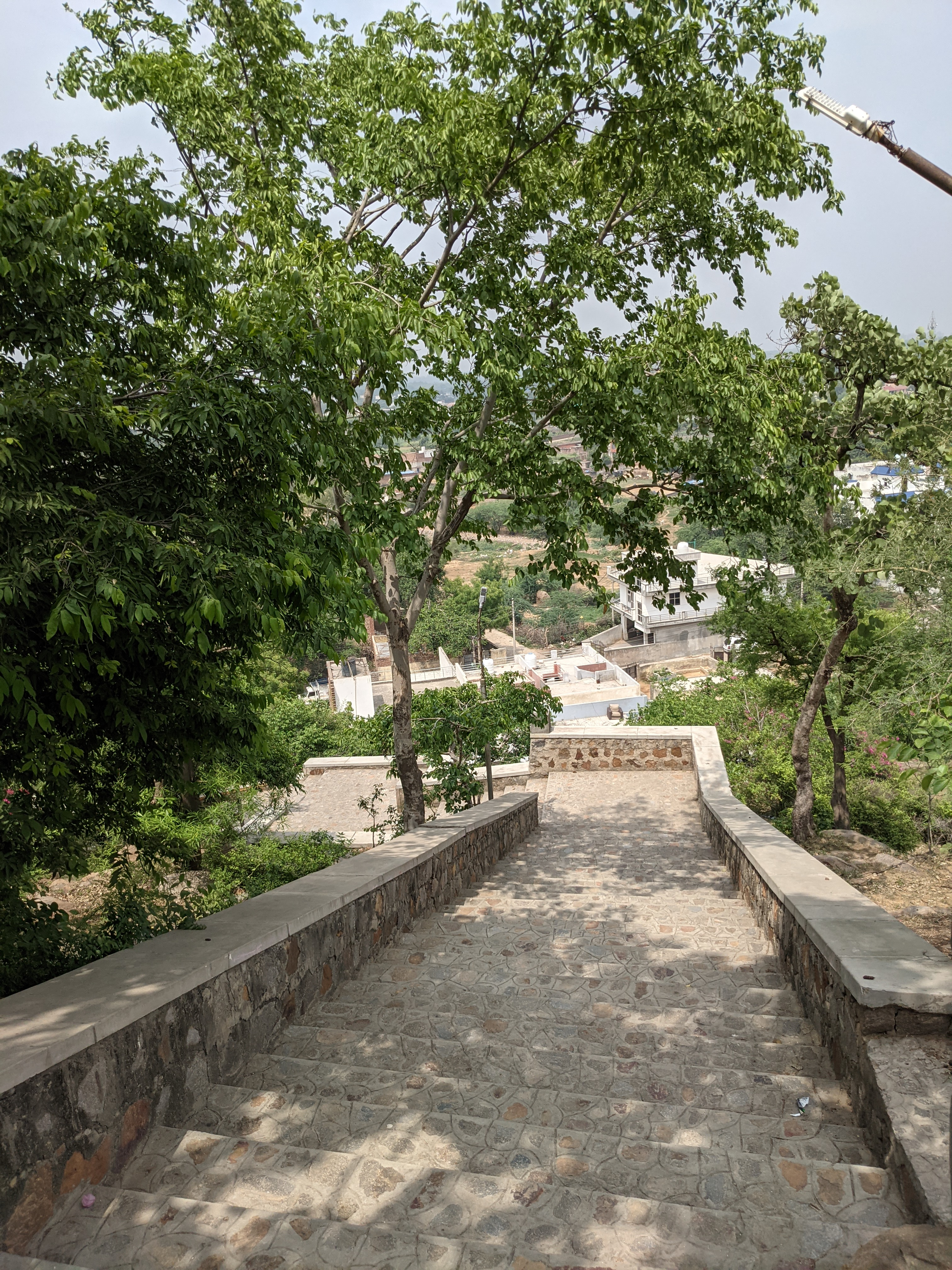
The way to Hari Parbat Anangpur

== See also ==
- History of Delhi
- History of Haryana
- History of India
