= Bhimbetka rock shelters =

30,000+ years old archaeological World Heritage site in Madhya Pradesh, India

Rock Shelters of Bhimbetka
UNESCO World Heritage Site
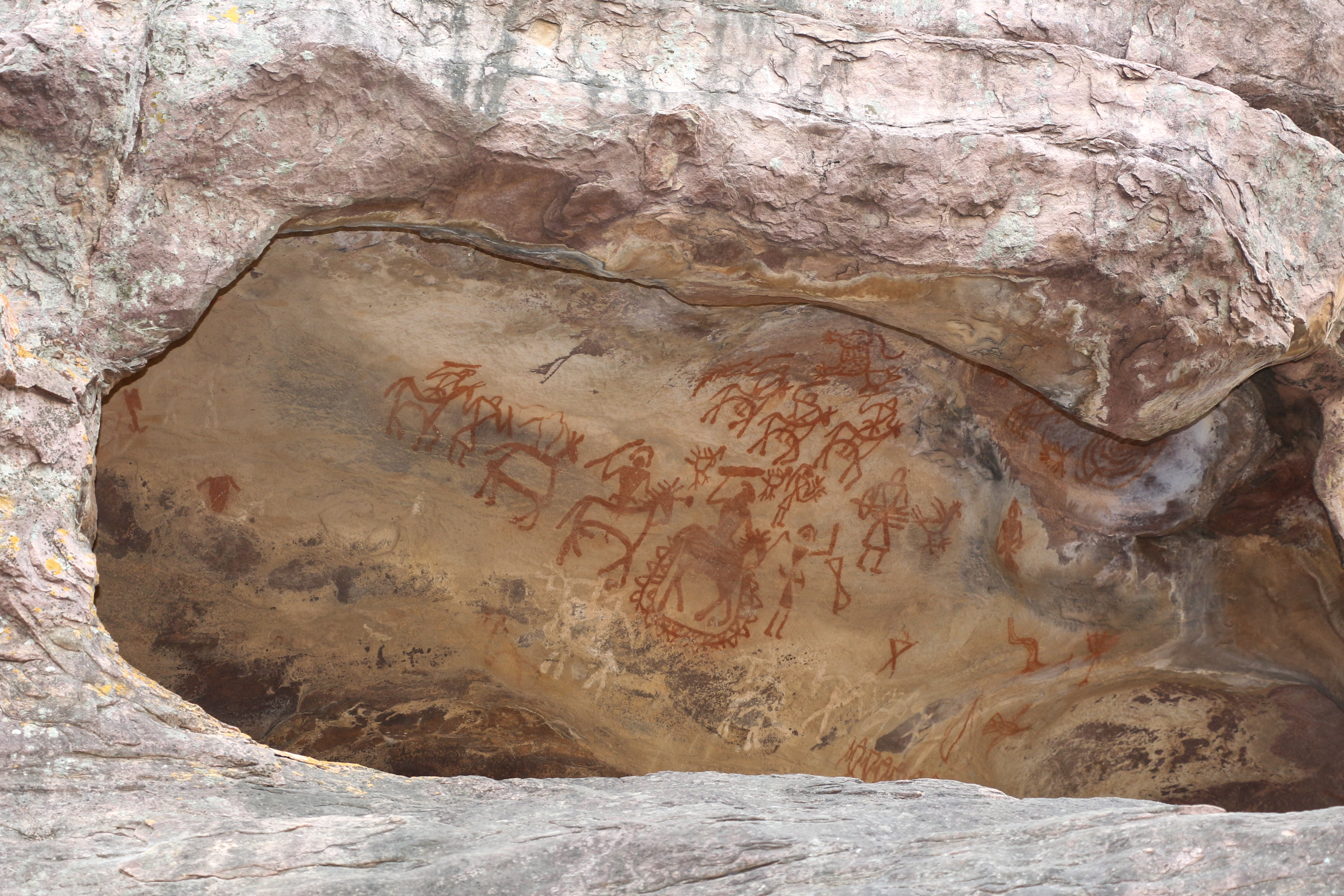
- Bhimbetka rock painting

- Location within India Location within Madhya Pradesh
- Location: Raisen district, Madhya Pradesh, India
- Criteria: World Heritage Site: Cultural: (iii), (v)
- Reference: 925
- Inscription: 2003 (27th Session)
- Area: 1,893 ha (7.31 sq mi)
- Buffer zone: 10,280 ha (39.7 sq mi)
- Coordinates: 22°56′18″N 77°36′47″E

The Bhimbetka rock shelters are an archaeological site in central India that spans the Paleolithic and Mesolithic periods, as well as the historic period. It exhibits the earliest traces of human life in India and evidence of the Stone Age starting at the site in Acheulean times. It is located in the Raisen district in the Indian state of Madhya Pradesh, about 45 kilometres (28 mi) south-east of Bhopal. It is a UNESCO World Heritage Site that consists of seven hills and over 750 rock shelters distributed over 10 km (6.2 mi). At least some of the shelters were inhabited more than 100,000 years ago.

The rock shelters and caves provide evidence of human settlement and the cultural evolution from hunter-gatherers to agriculture, and expressions of prehistoric spirituality.

Some of the Bhimbetka rock shelters feature prehistoric cave paintings and the earliest are dated to 10,000 BCE, corresponding to the Indian Mesolithic. These cave paintings show themes such as animals, early evidence of dance and hunting from the Stone Age as well as of warriors on horseback from a later time (perhaps the Bronze Age). The Bhimbetka site has the oldest-known rock art in India, as well as is one of the largest prehistoric complexes.

== Location ==
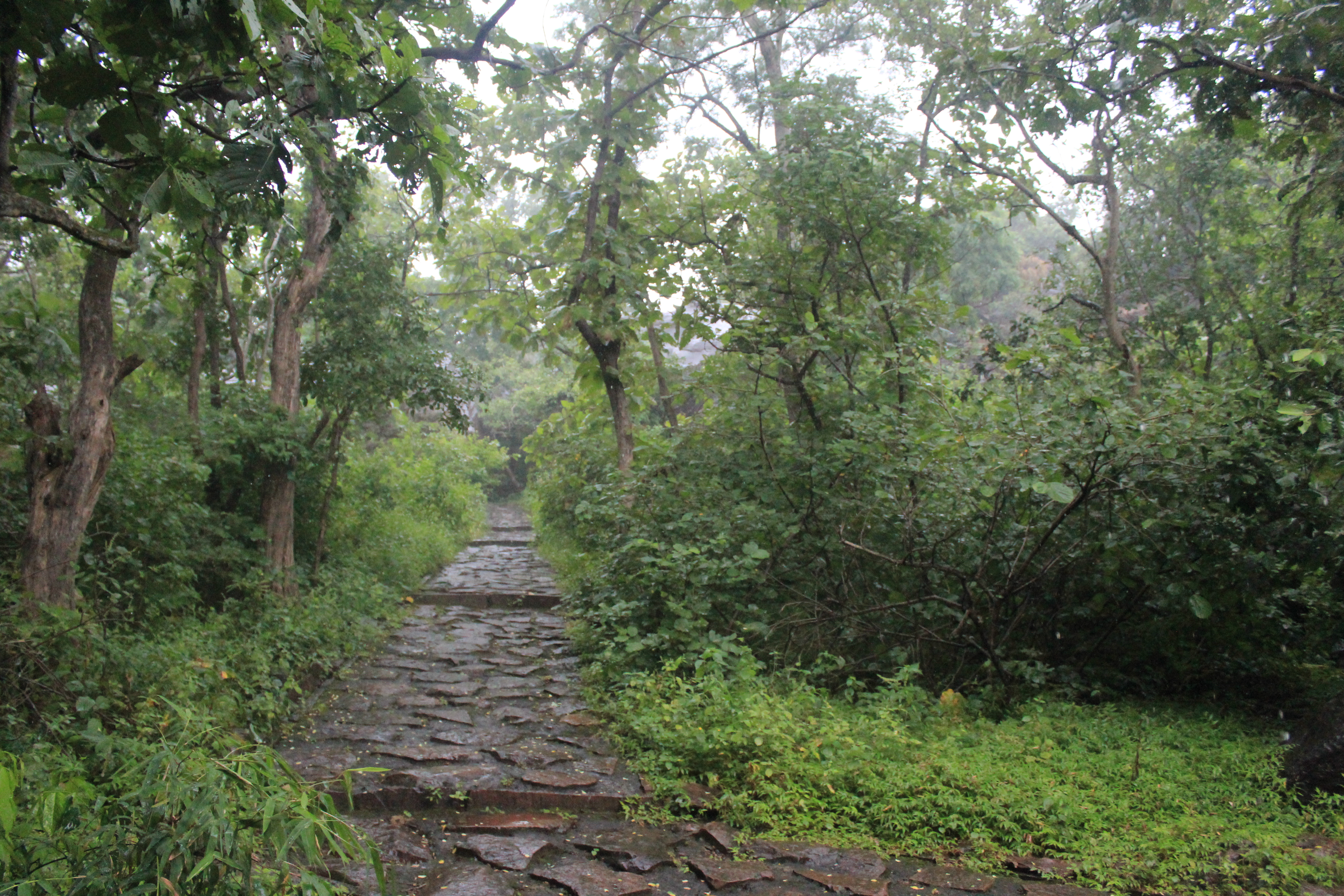
Archaeological Survey of India monument number N-MP-225

The Rock Shelters of Bhimbetka are 45 kilometres south-east of Bhopal and 9 km from Obedullaganj city in the Raisen district of Madhya Pradesh at the southern edge of the Vindhya Range. South of these rock shelters are successive ranges of the Satpura hills. It is inside the Ratapani Wildlife Sanctuary, embedded in sandstone rocks, in the foothills of the Vindhya Range. The site consists of seven hills: Vinayaka, Bhonrawali, Bhimbetka, Lakha Juar (east and west), Jhondra and Muni Babaki Pahari.

== Background ==
=== Etymology ===
Bhimbetka, meaning "Bhima's resting place" or "Bhima's lounge", is a compound word made of Bhima (second brother among the five Pandavas of Mahabharata) and Baithaka (seat or lounge). According to the native belief, Bhima during his exile used to rest here to interact with the locals. Bhima Worshiped Mata Vaishavi at this location and blessed for concurring the forthcoming war. There is a famous Mata Vaishavi Temple existing at this place since long.

=== History ===
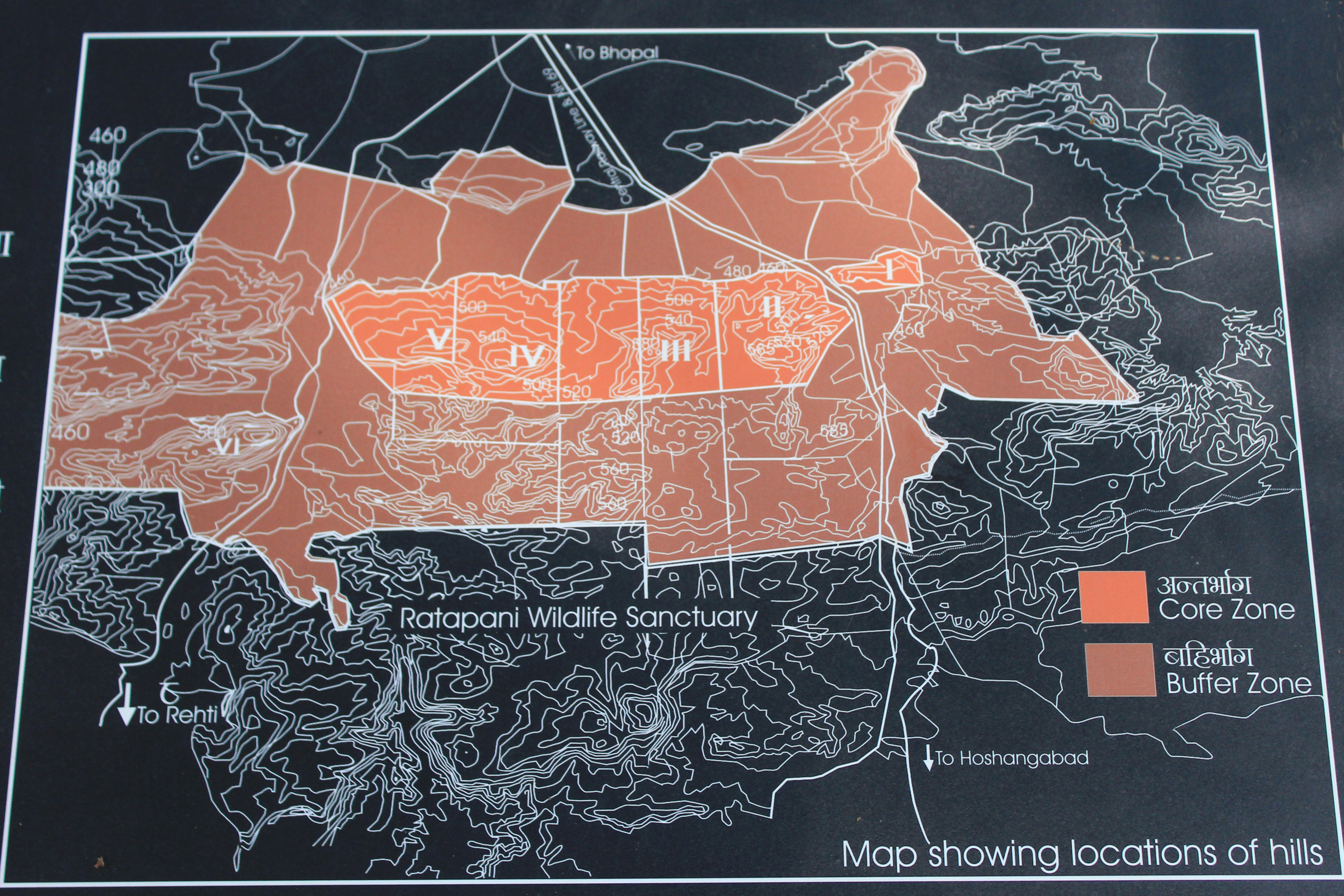
Bhimbetka location

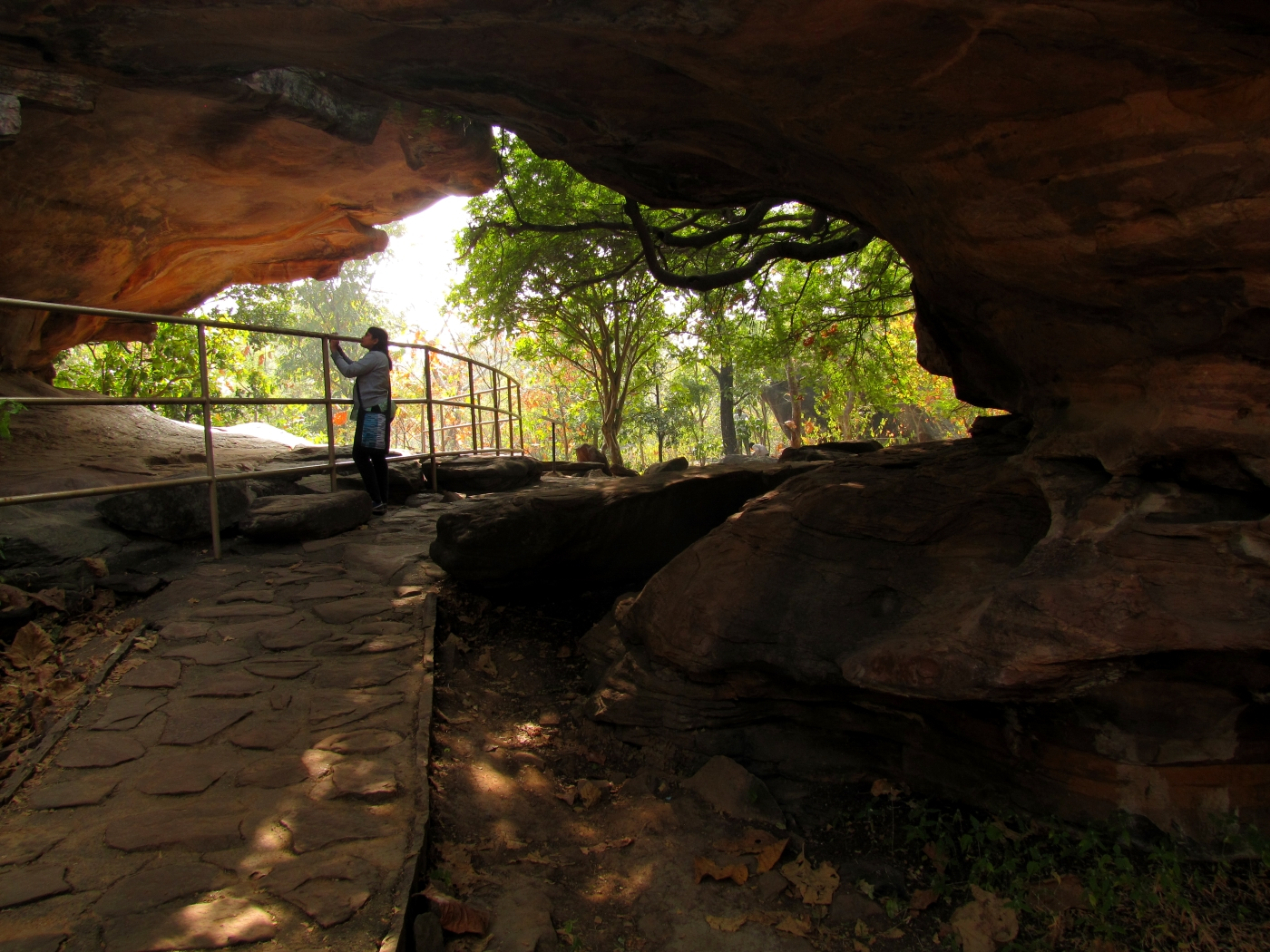
One of about 750 rock shelter caves at Bhimbetka.

W. Kincaid, a British India era official, first mentioned Bhimbetka in a scholarly paper in 1888. He relied on the information he gathered from adivasis (tribals) about Bhojpur lake in the area and referred to Bhimbetka as a Buddhist site. The first archaeologist to visit a few caves at the site and discover its prehistoric significance was V. S. Wakankar, who saw these rock formations and thought these were similar to those he had seen in Spain and France. He visited the area with a team of archaeologists and reported several prehistoric rock shelters in 1957.

It was only in the 1970s that the scale and true significance of the Bhimbetka rock shelters was discovered and reported. Since then, over 700 rock shelters, out of which around 400 contain prehistoric paintings that date back to the Paleolithic and Mesolithic periods (over 30,000 years old) are identified. The Bhimbetka group contains 243 of these, while the Lakha Juar group nearby has 178 shelters. According to Archaeological Survey of India, the evidence suggests that there has been a continuous human settlement here from the Stone Age through the late Acheulean to the late Mesolithic until the 2nd century BCE in these caves. This information is based on the findings from the excavation of the site, the unearthed artifacts and goods, pigments present in deposits, as well as the rock paintings.

The site contains the world's oldest stone walls and floors.

The origin of the raw materials utilized in certain monoliths uncovered at Bhimbetka has been traced back to Barkheda.

The site consisting of 1,892 hectares was declared as protected under Indian laws and came under the management of the Archaeological Survey of India in 1990. It was declared as a World Heritage Site by UNESCO in 2003.

== Auditorium cave ==
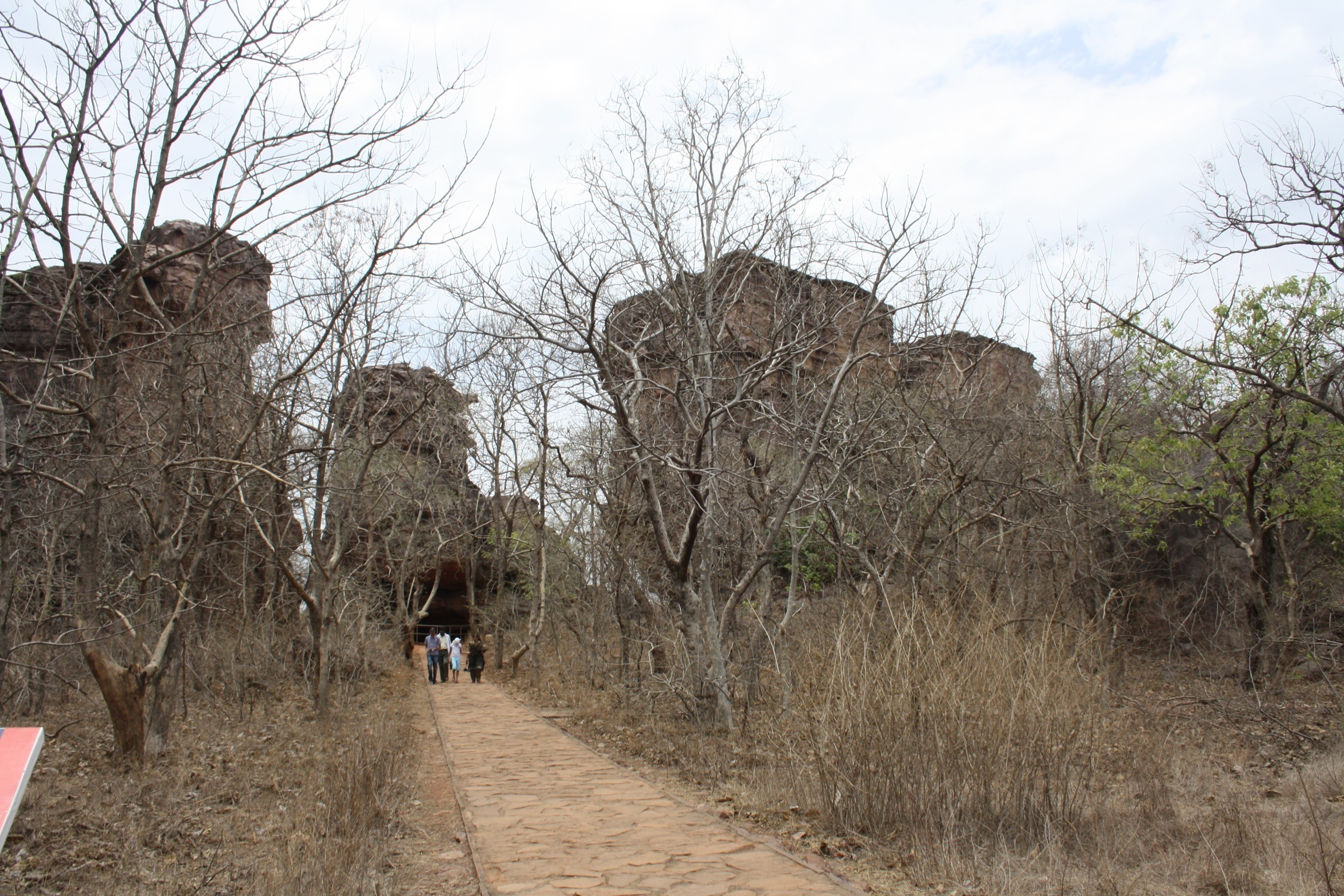
Bhimbetka quartzite towers

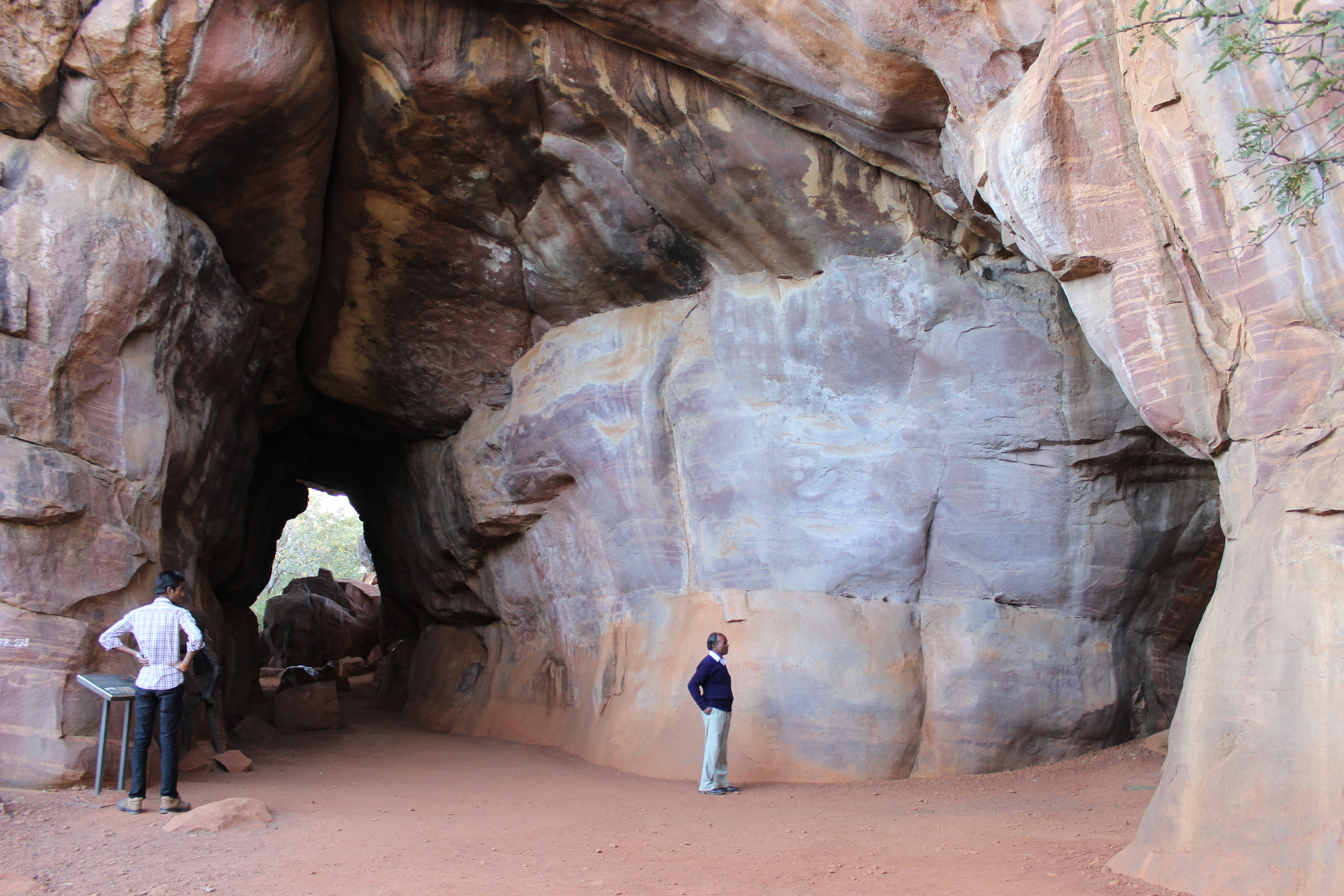
Auditorium cave

Of the numerous shelters, the Auditorium cave is one of the significant features of this site. Surrounded by quartzite towers which are visible from several kilometres' distance, the Auditorium rock is the largest shelter at Bhimbetka. Robert G. Bednarik describes the prehistoric Auditorium cave as one with a "cathedral-like" atmosphere, with "its Gothic arches and soaring spaces". Its plan resembles a "right-angled cross" with four of its branches aligned to the four cardinal directions. The main entrance points to the east. At the end of this eastern passage, at the cave's entrance, is a boulder with a near-vertical panel that is distinctive, one visible from distance and all directions. In archaeology literature, this boulder has been dubbed as "Chief's Rock" or "King's Rock", though there is no evidence of any rituals or its role as such. The boulder with the Auditorium cave is the central feature of the Bhimbetka, midst its 754 numbered shelters spread over few kilometres on either side, and nearly 500 locations where rock paintings can be found, states Bednarik.

== Rock art and paintings ==
The rock shelters and caves of Bhimbetka have a large number of paintings. Some of the oldest paintings are dated to 10,000 BCE, but some of the geometric figures date to as recently as the medieval period. The drawings and paintings can be classified under seven different periods. V. S. Wakankar classified the drawings and paintings into seven different periods and dated the earliest paintings to have belonged to the upper Palaeolithic to be as early as 40,000 years ago. The colours used are vegetable colours which have endured through time because the drawings were generally made deep inside a niche or on inner walls.

Period I – (Upper Paleolithic): These are linear representations in green of humans dancing and hunting.

Period II – (Mesolithic): Comparatively small in size the stylised figures in this group show linear decorations on the body. In addition to animals there are human figures and hunting scenes, giving a clear picture of the weapons they used: barbed spears, pointed sticks, bows and arrows. Some scenes are interpreted as depicting tribal war between three tribes symbolised by their animal totems. The depiction of communal dances, birds, musical instruments, mothers and children, pregnant women, men carrying dead animals, drinking and burials appear in rhythmic movement.

Period III – (Chalcolithic) Similar to the paintings of the Mesolithic, these drawings reveal that during this period the cave dwellers of this area were in contact with the agricultural communities of the Malwa plains, exchanging goods with them.

Period IV & V – (Early historic): The figures of this group have a schematic and decorative style and are painted mainly in red, white and yellow. The association is of riders, depiction of religious symbols, tunic-like dresses and the existence of scripts of different periods. The religious beliefs are represented by figures of yakshas, tree gods and magical sky chariots.

Period VI & VII – (Medieval): These paintings are geometric linear and more schematic, but they show degeneration and crudeness in their artistic style. The colors used by the cave dwellers were prepared by combining black manganese oxides, red hematite and charcoal.

One rock, popularly referred to as "Zoo Rock", depicts elephants, barasingha (swamp deer), bison and deer. Paintings on another rock show a peacock, a snake, a deer and the sun. On another rock, two elephants with tusks are painted. Hunting scenes with hunters carrying bows, arrows, swords, and shields also find their place in the community of these pre-historic paintings. In one of the caves, a bison is shown in pursuit of a hunter while his two companions appear to stand helplessly nearby; in another, some horsemen are seen, along with archers. In one painting, a large wild bovine (possibly a gaur or bison) is seen.

Yashodhar Mathpal has conducted a very careful study of the various animals depicted in these rock shelters. He has identified sloth bear, wolf, hyaena, rhinoceros, wild cattle, deer, antelopes, hare, monkeys, anteater, rats, fish, turtle, peafowl, some birds without any details among the wild animals and a domesticated dog. Deer and antelope are amongst the most numerous of the wild animals depicted. The pictures include groups of hunters; one such group is depicted as running away from a rhinoceros. Other groups are engaged in hunting deer, antelopes and other prey. Spear and bow and arrow are the main weapons of hunt; fish and turtle are being caught in a net, and rats are being driven out of their burrows to be caught. The paintings are classified largely in two groups, one as depictions of hunters and food gatherers, and in others as fighters, riding on horses and elephant carrying metal weapons. The first group of paintings date to prehistoric times while second one dates to historic times. Most of the paintings from the historic period depict battles between rulers carrying swords, spears, bows and arrows.

In one of the desolate rock shelters, the painting of a man holding a trident-like staff and dancing has been nicknamed "Nataraja" by archaeologist V. S. Wakankar. It is estimated that paintings in at least 100 rock shelters might have eroded away.

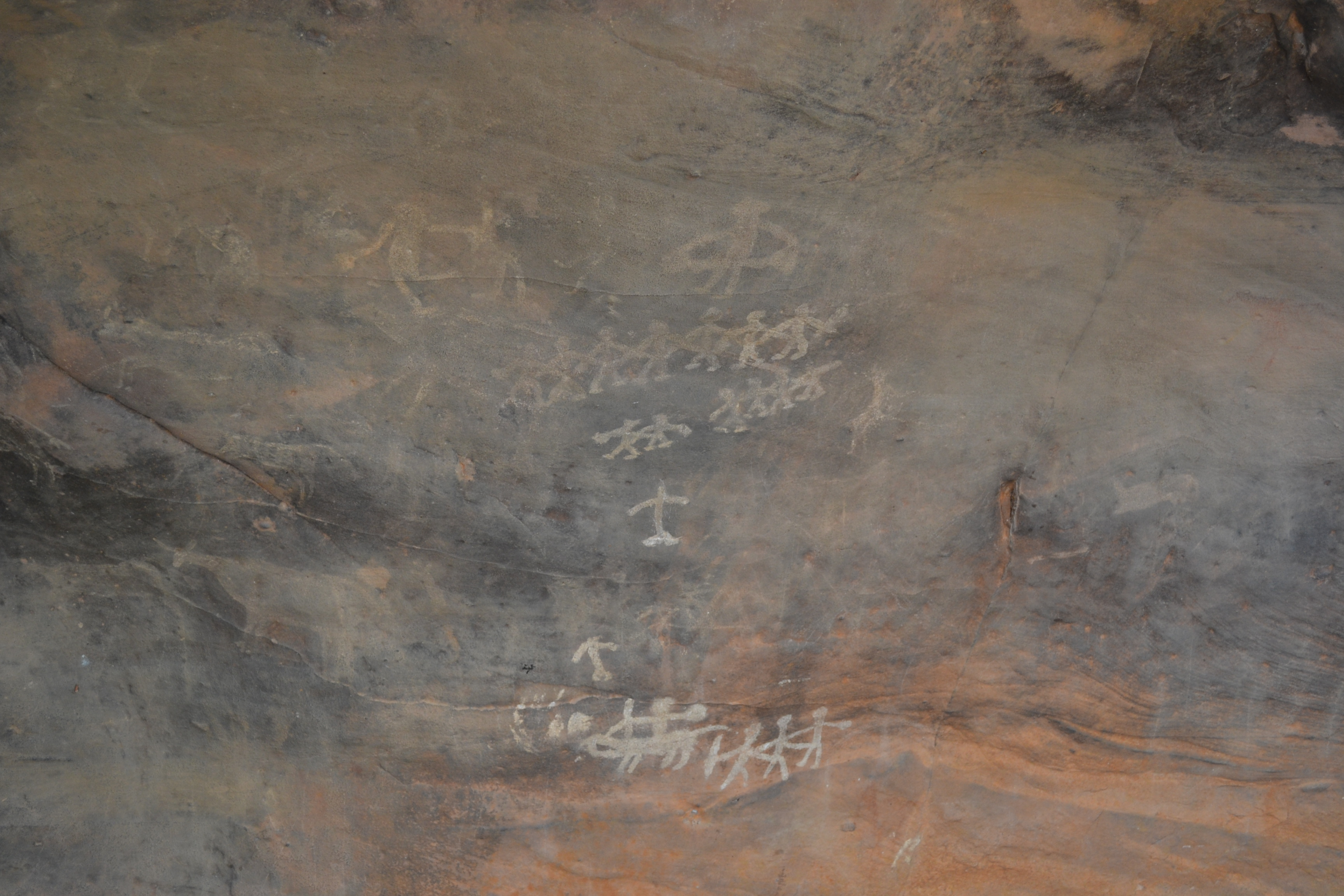
Mesolithic dancers

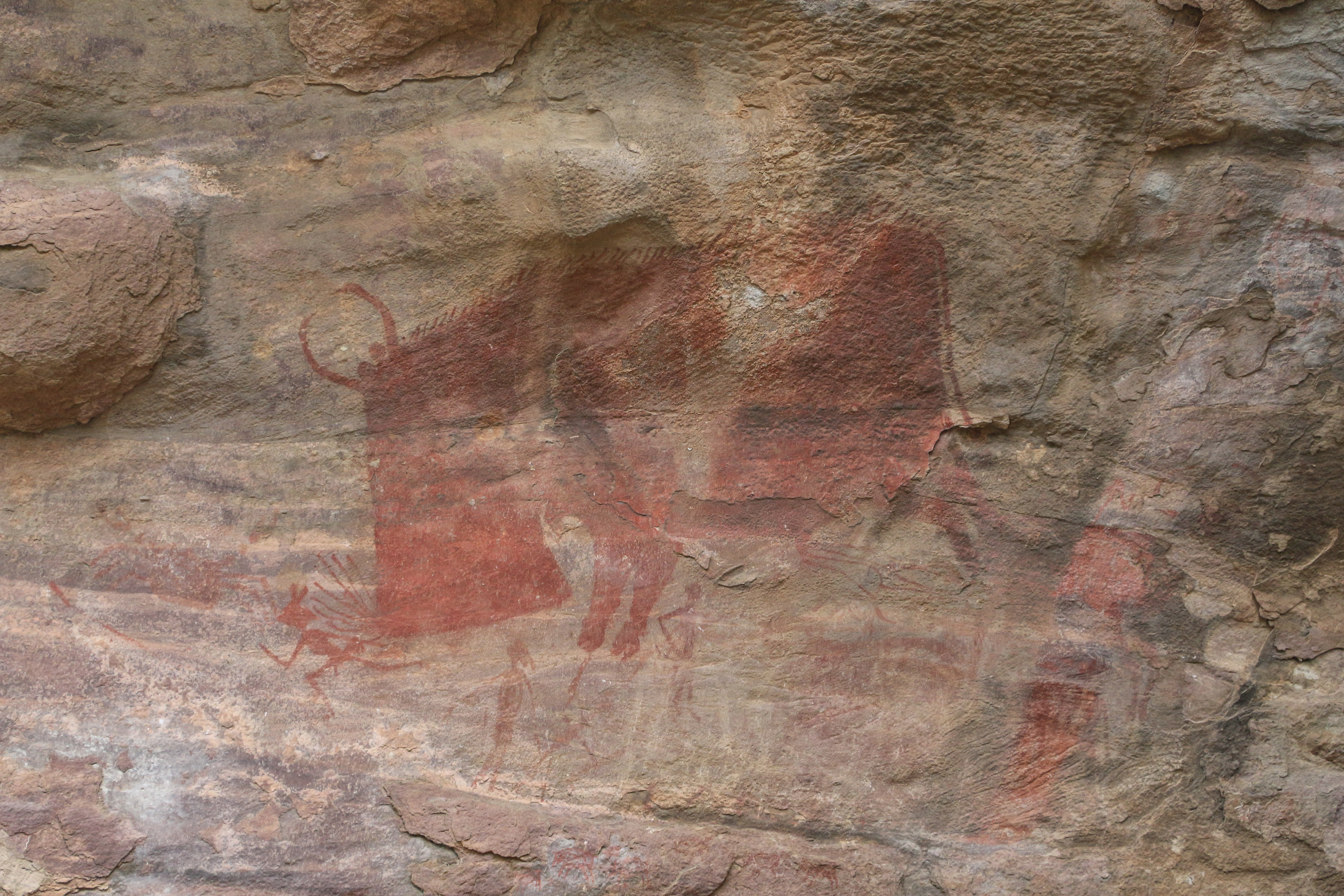
A man being attacked by a horned bovine.

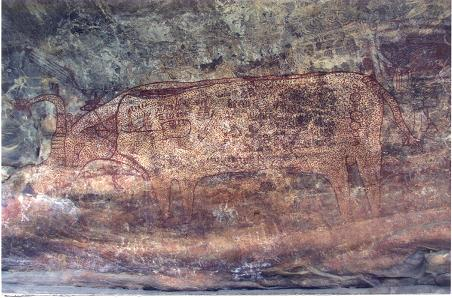
Rock painting dated to 8,000 - 3,000 BCE depicting a humpless bovine.

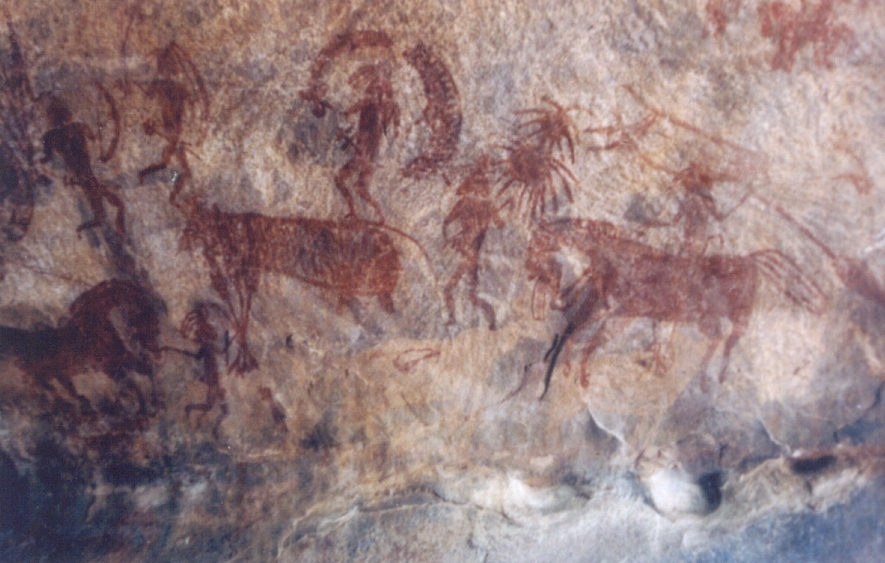
people hunting a bison animal

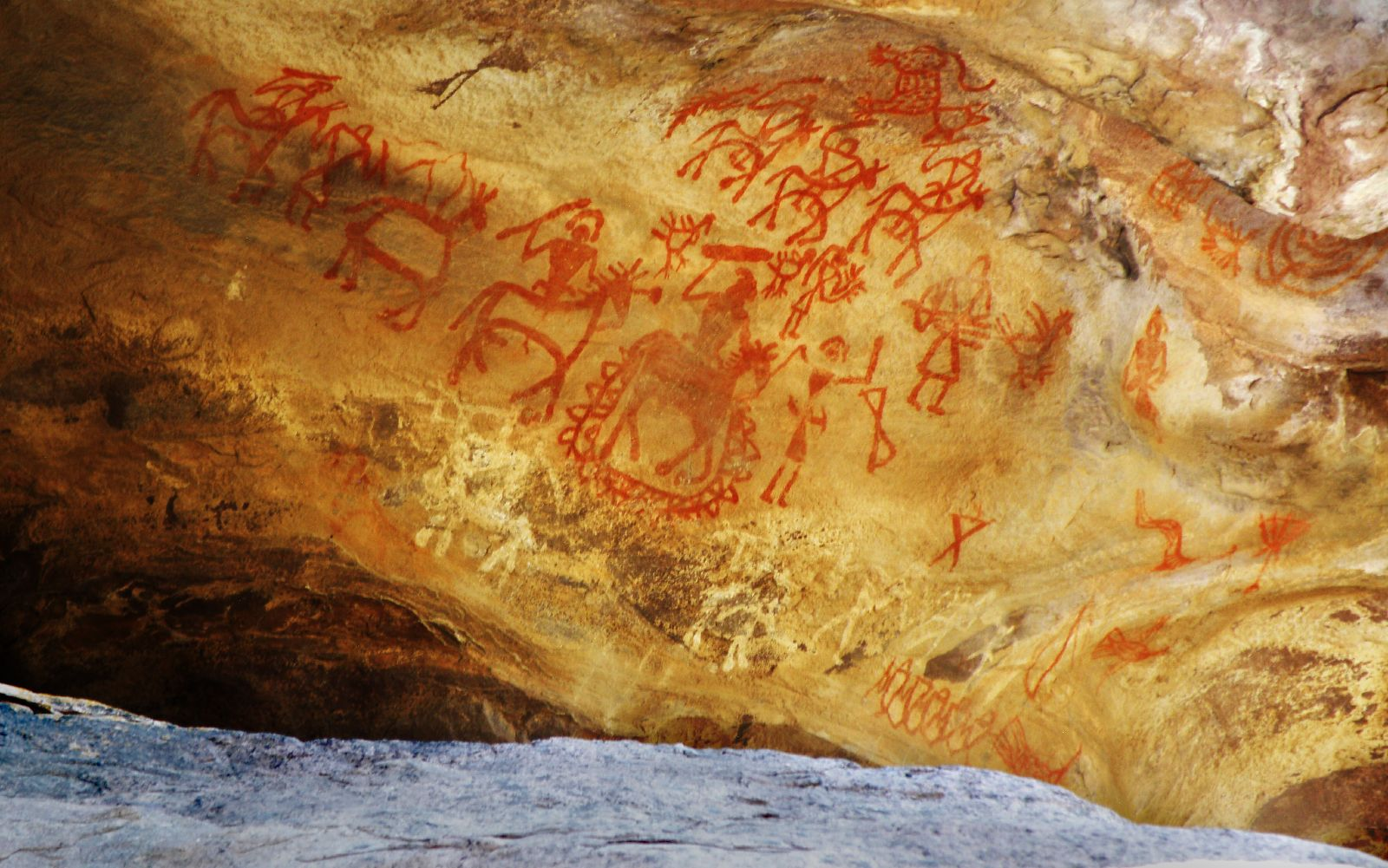
People riding horses holding weapons

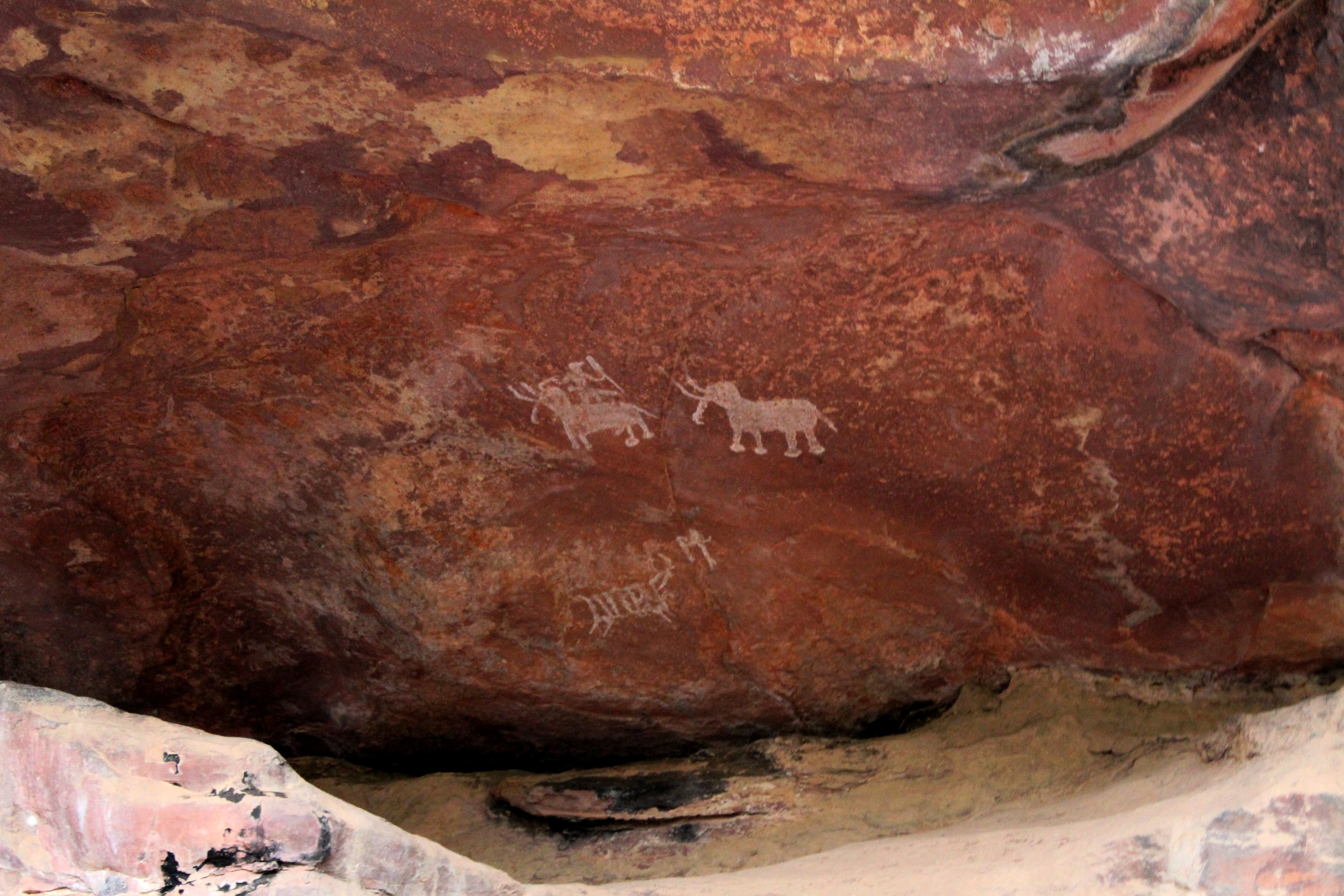
Man riding a tamed elephant

An eroded painting in the caves showing a man dancing and holding a trident-like staff

== "Dickinsonia fossils" ==
Fossils of Dickinsonia tenuis, an early animal from the Ediacaran Period, were reported from Bhimbetka; they were said to be similar to D. tenuis fossils found in the Ediacara Hills in South Australia. From this, several paleogeographic conclusions were made, such as the formation of Gondwanaland by 550 million years ago. However, later examination showed that the purported fossil material was simply decayed remnants of a beehive.

== Similar sites in India ==
Some Mesolithic sites with cave art, tools, paintings, etc. are Anangpur Caves (Faridabad) and Mangar Bani Caves (Gurgaon) in Delhi NCR, and Pahargarh Caves (Morena) in Madhya Pradesh.

== See also ==
- Belum Caves
- Cave paintings and other rock art
- Cave paintings in India
- Cumbemayo, Peru
- Pahargarh Caves
- Petroglyph National Monument
- Rock art
- Rock carvings at Alta
- Rock shelters of Madhya Pradesh
