= Kakanmath =

Pratihara-style panchayatana Shiva temple complex (1000–1025 CE)

- ककनमठ
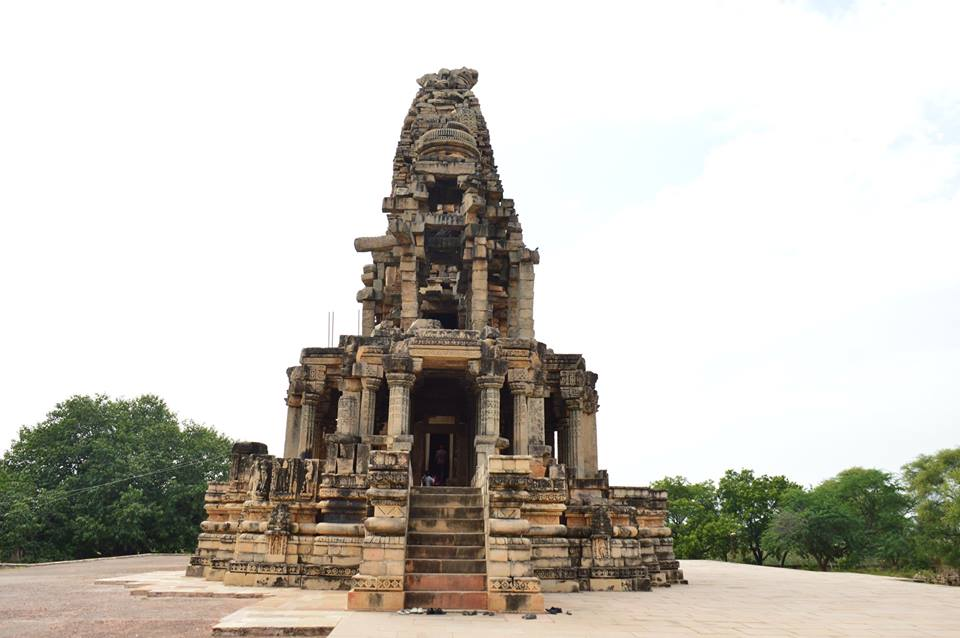
- Kakanmath in 2015

- Location in Madhya Pradesh, India Kakanmath (India)

Religion
- Affiliation: Shaivism
- District: Morena
- Deity: Shiva

Location
- Location: Sihoniya
- State: Madhya Pradesh
- Country: India
- Interactive map of Kakanmath
- Coordinates: 26.5849309°N 78.2485567°E

Architecture
- Established: 1015-1035 CE

Kakanmaṭh is a ruined 11th century Shiva temple located at Sihoniya in Madhya Pradesh, India. It was built by the Kachchhapaghata ruler Kirttiraja. Only a part of the original temple complex now survives. Some of the sculptures from the site are now located at Gwalior.

== History ==
The Kakanmath temple was commissioned by Kachchhapaghata ruler Kirttiraja (r. c. 1015-1035 CE). This can be inferred from a Kachchhapaghata inscription found at the Sas-Bahu Temple in Gwalior. The inscription states that Kirttiraja built an extraordinary temple devoted to Parvati's lord (Shiva) at Siṁhapānīya (modern Sihoniya).

According to a folk legend, the temple was named "Kakanmadh" after Kakanavati or Kakanade, who was the queen of one Surajpala. The historicity of this legend is doubtful. One possibility is that the name of the temple derives from the words kanak (gold) and maṭha (shrine).

Originally, the site had a temple complex, with a central temple surrounded by four subsidiary shrines. Only the ruins of the central temple stand now: its outer walls, balconies and a part of its spire have fallen. This damage probably happened during an earthquake. A Sanskrit-language pillar inscription dated 1[4]50 VS (1393-94 CE) records the renovation of the Mahadeva temple (that is, Kakanmath) by one Durgaprasada. A 1497 VS (1440-41 CE) pillar inscription records the visit of a pilgrim named Dekhana during the reign of Dungara (a Tomara ruler of Gwalior). It states that Dekhana was the son of Kakaka, and a resident of Nalapuragaḍha.

Now, the temple has been classified as a Monument of National Importance by the Archaeological Survey of India (ASI).

== Architecture ==
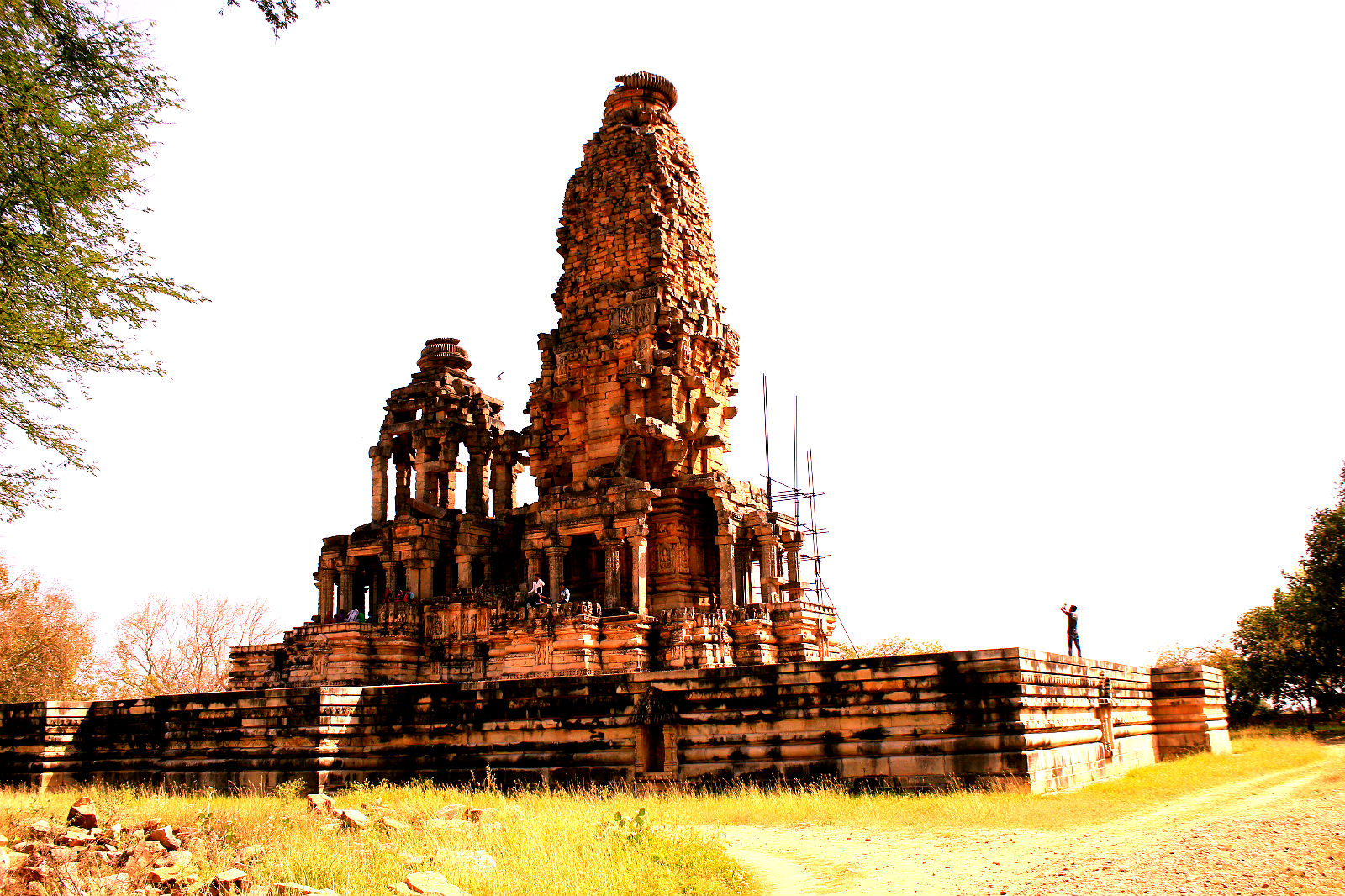
Kakanmath

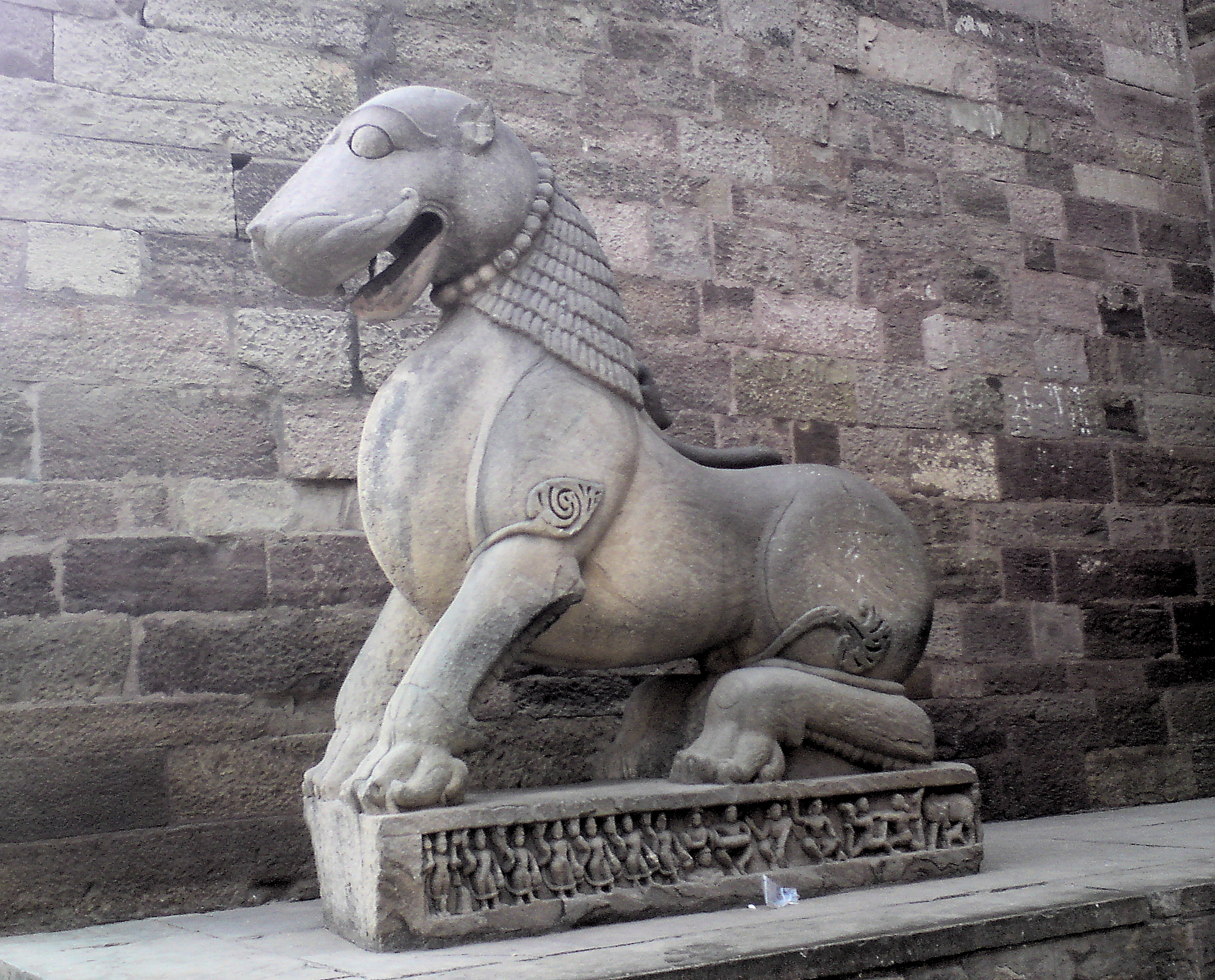
Lion statues, now at Gwalior

The temple stands on an ornate base (pitha). The building includes a sanctum, a vestibule, and two halls (gudha-mandapa and mukha-mandapa). The sanctum has a circumambulatory path with three transepts. The gudha-mandapa has lateral transepts, and four clusters of pillars; each cluster contains four pillars. The vestibule has four pillars in a row, which are aligned with the four clusters of the gudha-mandapa. The shikhara (tower) of the shrine makes it around 30 m high.

The steps at the entrance had two large lion statues, which are now located at the entrance of the Archaeological Museum, Gwalior. Many other sculptures have also been taken to Gwalior.
