= Siege of Gwalior =

Siege of Gwalior may refer to:

- Siege of Gwalior (1021), conflict between the Ghaznavid Empire and the Kachchhapaghata dynasty,
- Siege of Gwalior (1196), conflict between the Ghurid dynasty and the Kachchhapaghata dynasty,
- Siege of Gwalior (1232), conflict between Dehli Sultanate and the Parihar Rajput clan or
- Siege of Gwalior (1518), conflict between Tomaras of Gwalior and Lodi dynasty.

== See also ==
- Conquest of Gwalior, the 1231 conflict between the Delhi sultanate and the Parihar Rajputs.
