= Sasbahu Temple, Gwalior =

Hindu temple in Gwalior, India

Saas Bahu Twin Temples, Gwalior
- Sas Bahu Temples
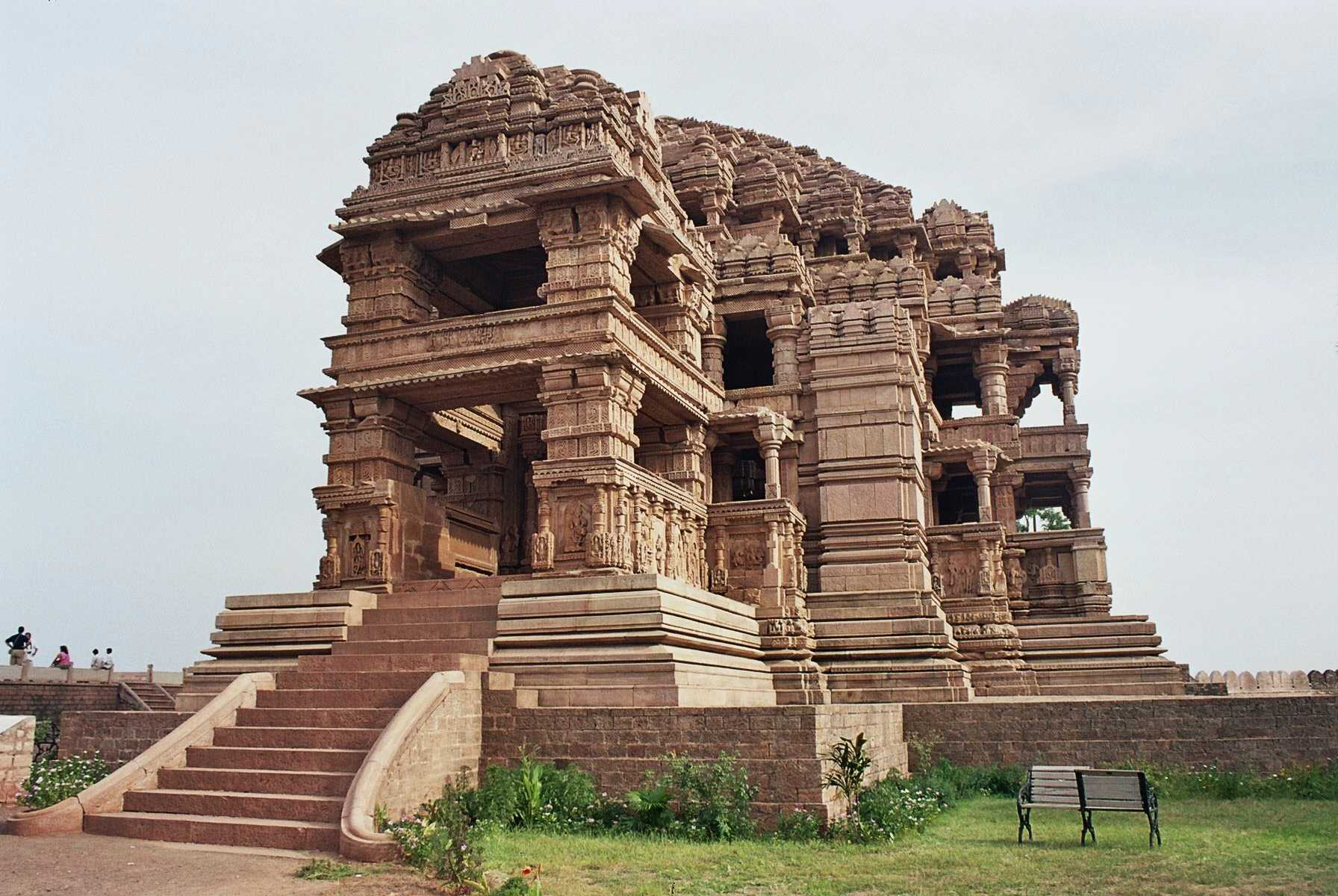
- Saas Temple

- Location within India Location within Madhya Pradesh

Religion
- Affiliation: Hinduism
- District: Gwalior
- Deity: Shiva and Vishnu

Location
- Location: Gwalior Fort
- State: Madhya Pradesh
- Country: India
- Coordinates: 26°13′26.2″N 78°10′12.9″E

Architecture
- Style: Nagara
- Completed: 11th-century

Sas Bahu Temples, also called the Sasa-Baku Temples (in Pali), Sas aur Bahu ke Mandir, Sas-Bahu Twin Temples, are the 11th-century twin temples in Gwalior, Madhya Pradesh, India within the Gwalior Fort complex. The bigger temple (Saas) is dedicated to Aniruddha, considered widely as a Jana avatar, an avatar of Vishnu and grandson of Lord Krishna & the smaller temple (Bahu) is dedicated to Shiva. Like most Hindu and Jain temples in this region, they were mostly in ruins and were badly damaged from numerous invasions and Hindu-Muslim wars in the region. They were built between 1090 and 1093 by King Mahipala of the Kachchhapaghata dynasty, the larger one (Saas) was constructed for his wife who was Vaishnava and the smaller one (Bahu) was constructed for his daughter-in-law who was a shiva devotee, according to an inscription found in the larger of the twin temple and as deciphered by Alexander Cunningham the first Director-General of the Archaeological Survey of India. The twin temples are situated in the Gwalior Fort.

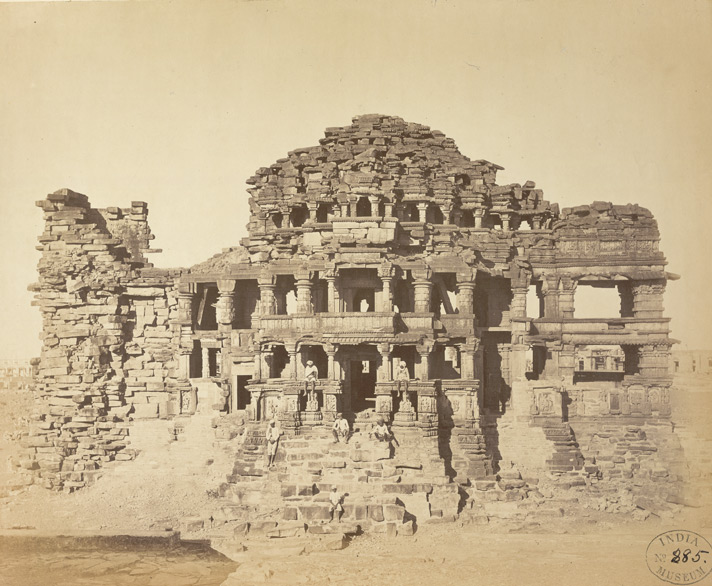
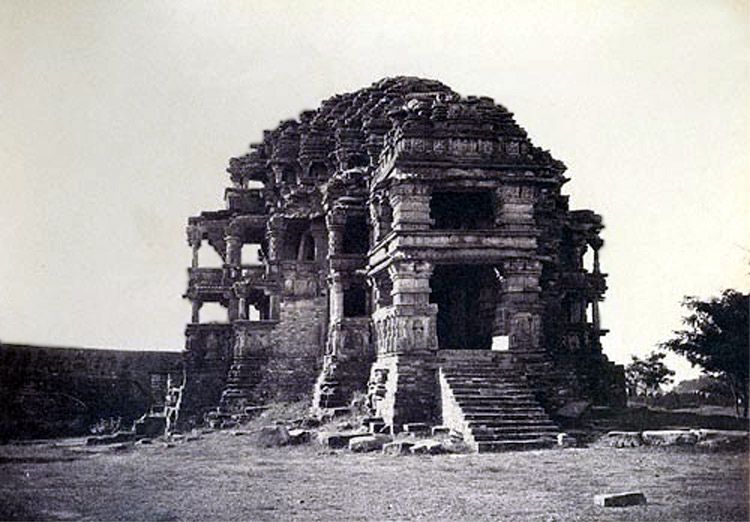
Saas Temple ruins in 1869.

The temple's tower and sanctum has been destroyed, but its architecture and damaged carvings can still be appreciated from the ruins. The jagati platform is 100 feet (30 m) long and 63 feet (19 m) wide, on a square plan. The temple was three-storeyed, which was one of its distinguishing features and sophistication. It followed a central cluster concept, states Adam Hardy. The surviving elements of the temple are the entrance porch and the mandapa. According to James Harle, though the prasada (tower, spire) no longer exists, the triple storey plan with a cruciform foundation and balconies suggests that it had a North Indian Bhumija style architecture. This style, states Harle, is marked by a well proportioned superstructure, its "regularly arranged little subordinate sikharas strung out like gigantic beaded garlands".

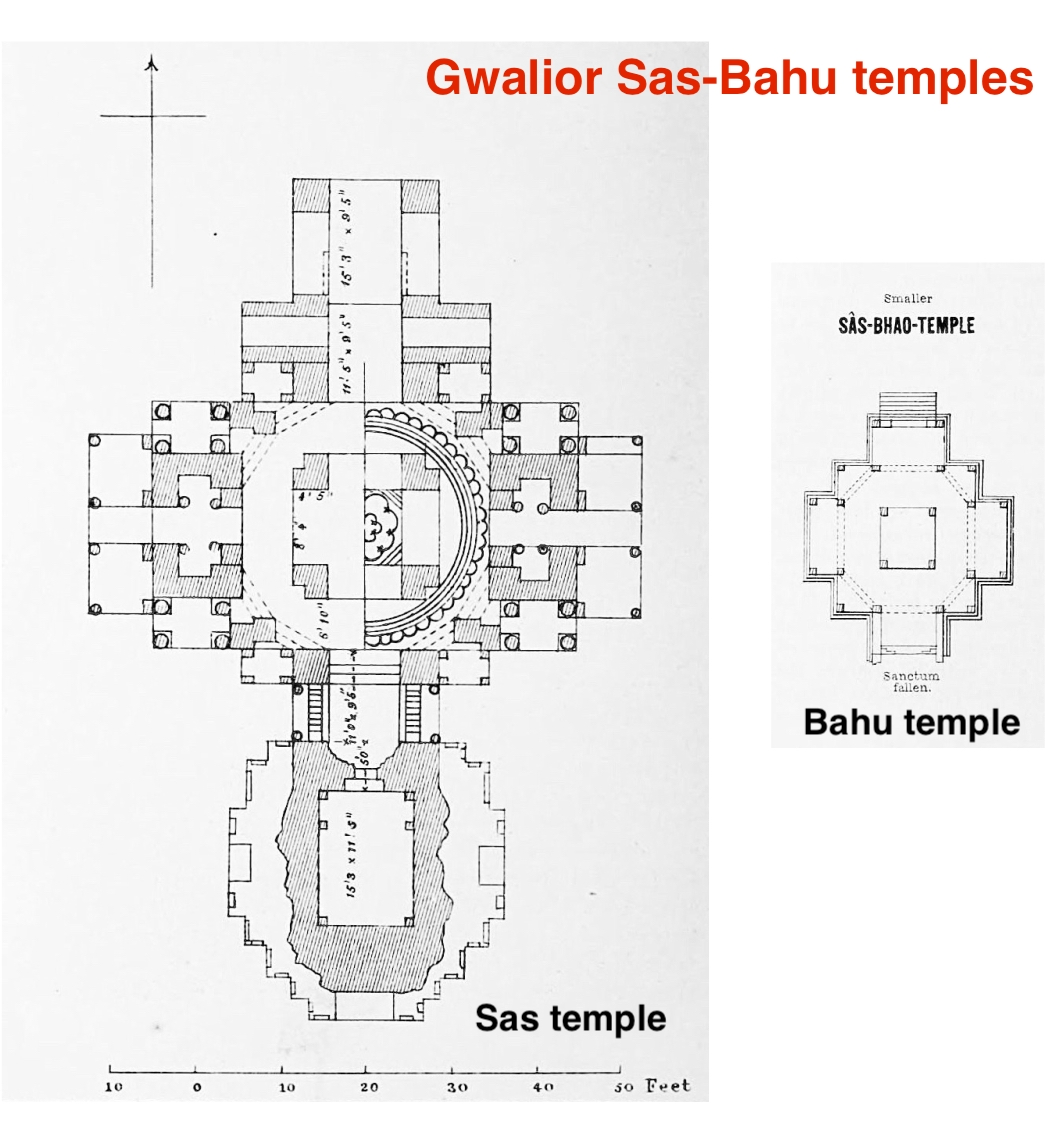
Saasbahu temples plan, a sketch made in 1871.

This temple mainly has three entrances from three different directions. In the fourth direction, there is a room which is currently closed. The entire temple is covered with carvings, notably 4 idols of Brahma, Vishnu and Saraswati above its entrance door. The pillar carvings show Vaishnavism, Shaivism and Shaktism related carvings. The larger temple ornamentation covers all the exterior walls and all surviving interior surfaces.

The twin temple, unlike elsewhere in India, has historically been called Sas bahu temples. The word Sas bahu means "mother-in-law, or "a mother with her daughter-in-law", an association that implies their being together and interdependent. The Sas temple is typically the larger older temple of the twin. The Gwalior's Sas Bahu Temples follows this style, the temples are dedicated to Aniruddha (grandson of Krishna) & Shiva. Only the Sas temple has survived in some form, the Bahu temple is a shell structure of the original one storey with a highly ornate door frame and its defaced wall reliefs surviving. The remnants of the Bahu temple at Gwalior suggest that it may have been a smaller version of the Saas temple.

The Sas temple has a square sanctum attached to a rectangular two storey antarala and a closed three storey mandapa with three entrances. The temple main entrance porch has four carved Ruchaka ghatapallava-style pillars that are load-bearing. The walls and lintels are intricately carved, though much defaced. On the lintel of the entrances, friezes of Krishna-leela scenes are carved inside, while the outer side narrate legends from other Hindu texts. Above the lintel is Garuda, the vahana of Vishnu.

The Bahu temple also has a square sanctum with 9.33 feet (2.84 m) side, with four central pillars. Its maha-mandapa is also a square with 23.33 feet (7.11 m) side, with twelve pillars. The temple, like most Malwa and Rajputana historic temples, provides multiple entrances to the devotee. The roof consists of two rotated squares that intersect to form an octagon capped by successive overlapping circles. The pillars have octagonal bases as well, with girls carved but these have been defaced and mutilated. The sanctum has an image of damaged Vishnu, next to whom stands Brahma holding the Vedas on one side and Shiva holding the trident on the other side.

== Gallery ==
Saas temple (bigger)

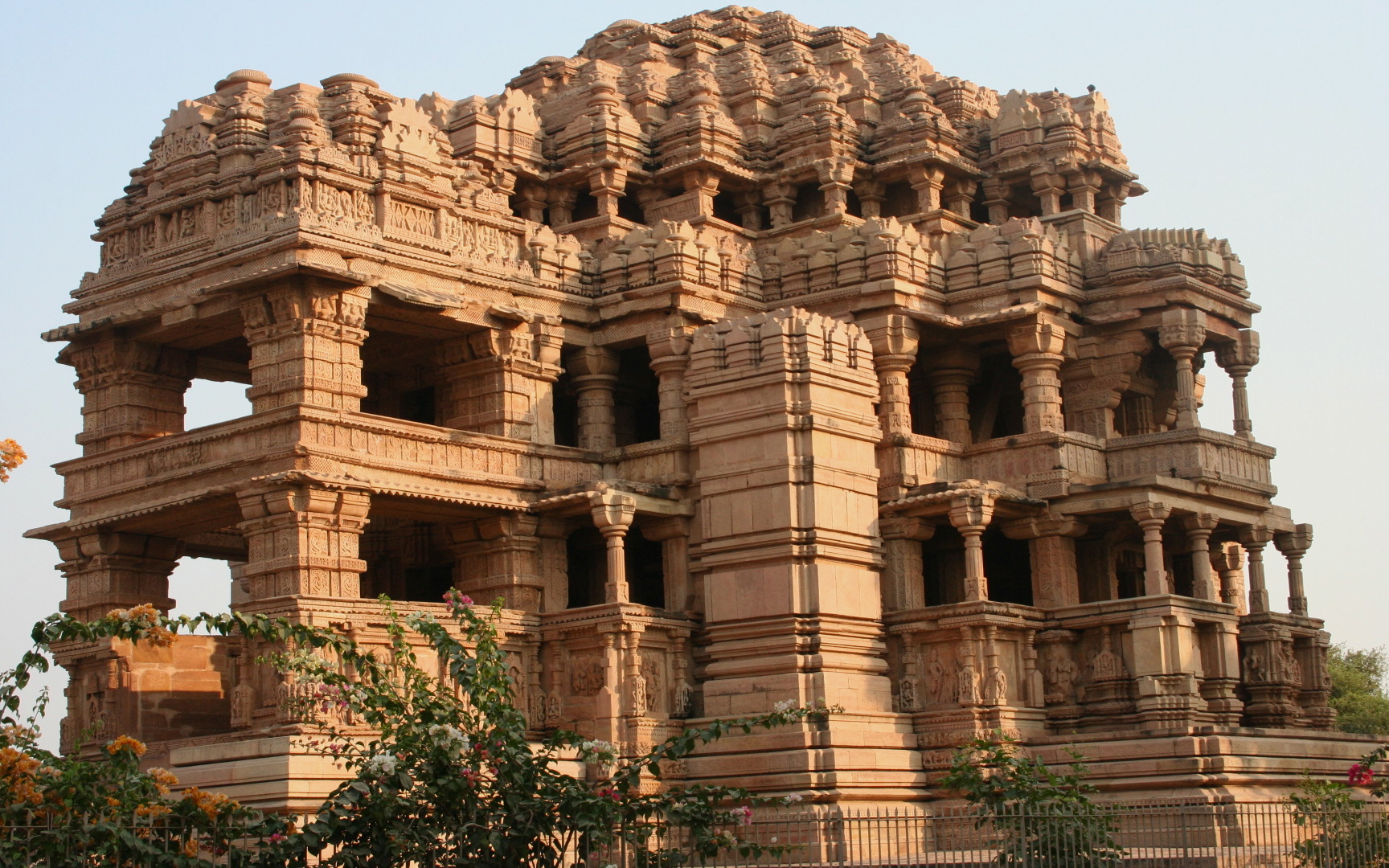
The larger of the twin temple

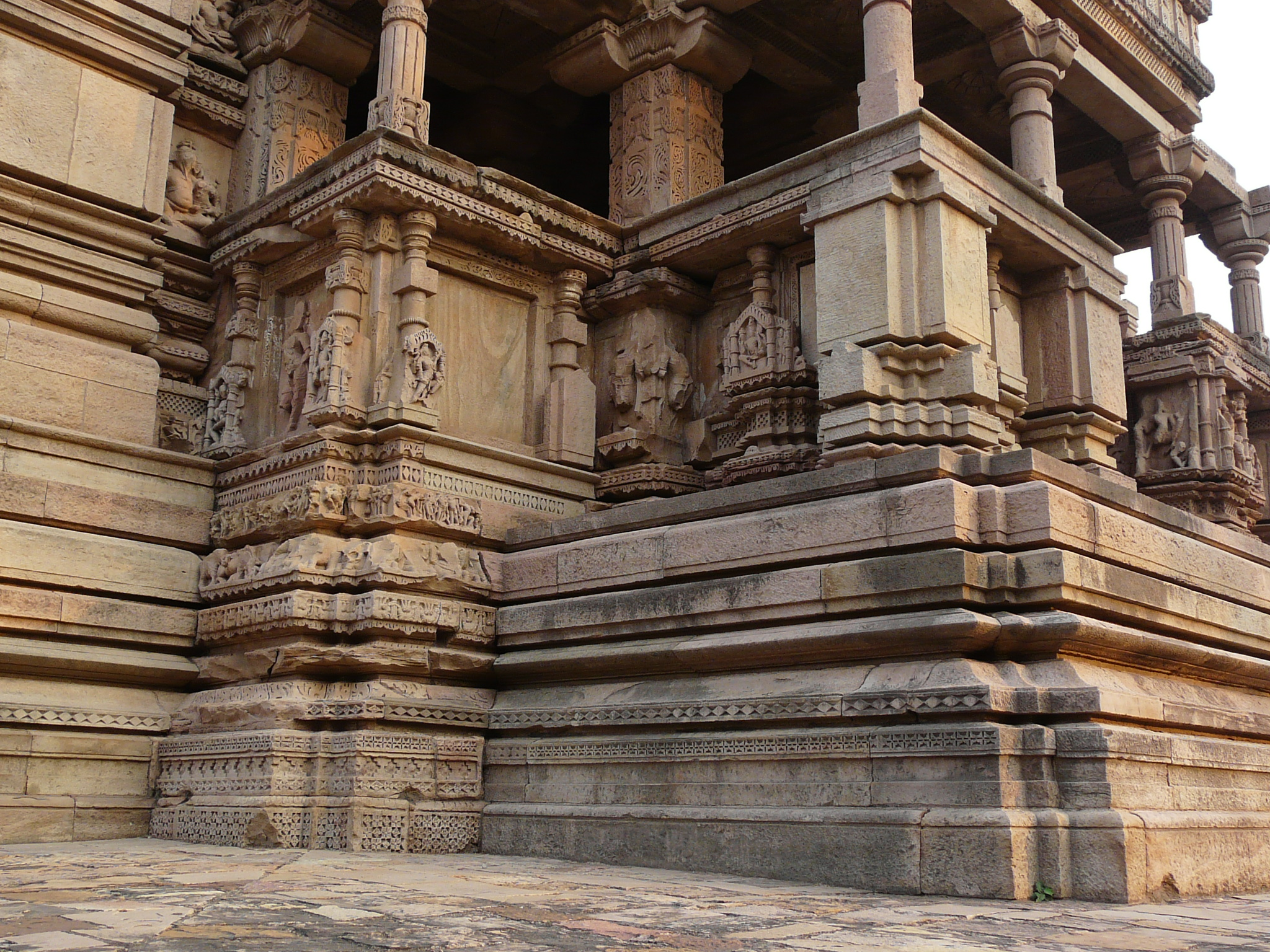
Adhisthana and stambha designs in the Sas temple

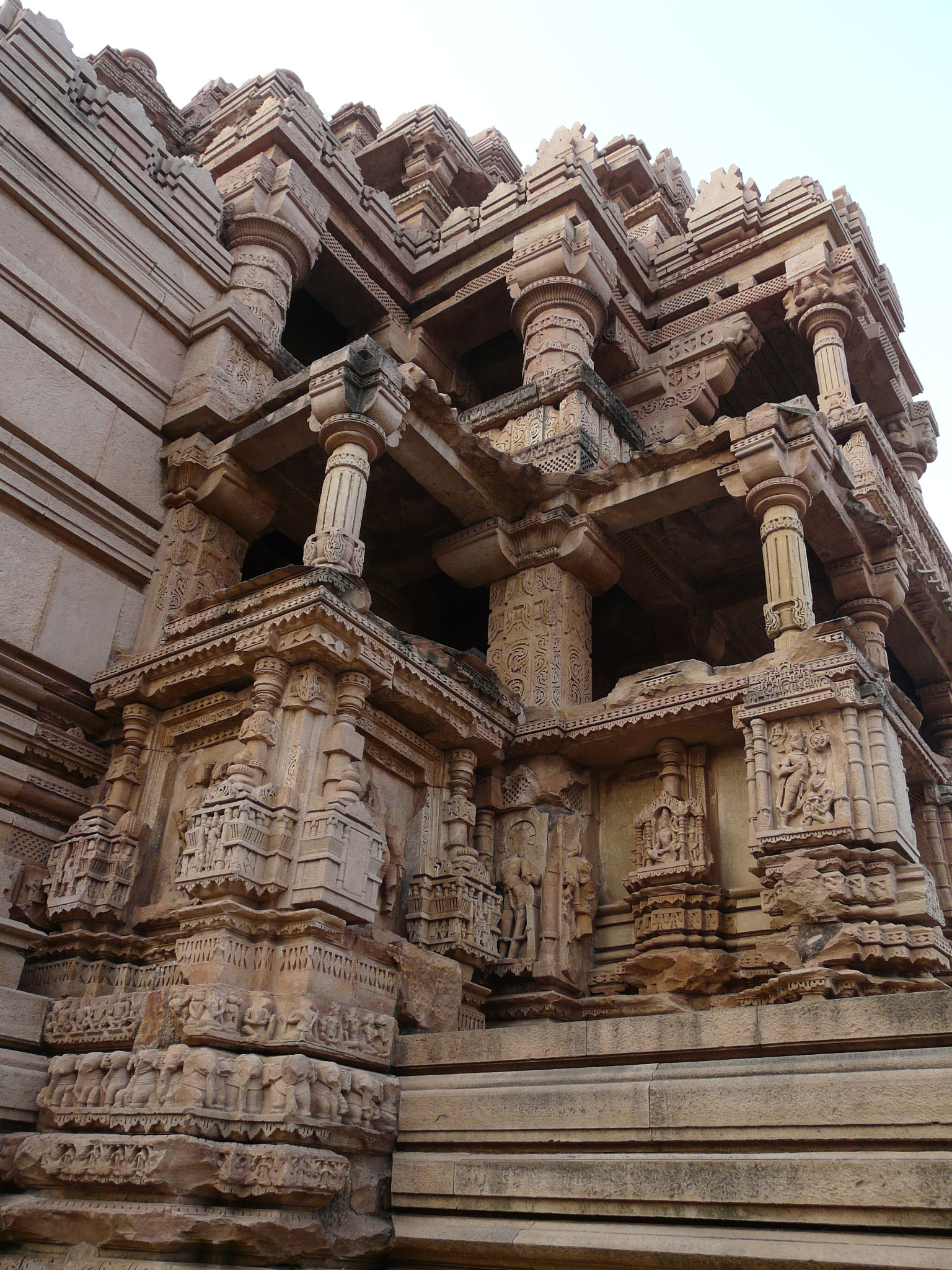
Wall reliefs on the outer wall of Saas temple (defaced)

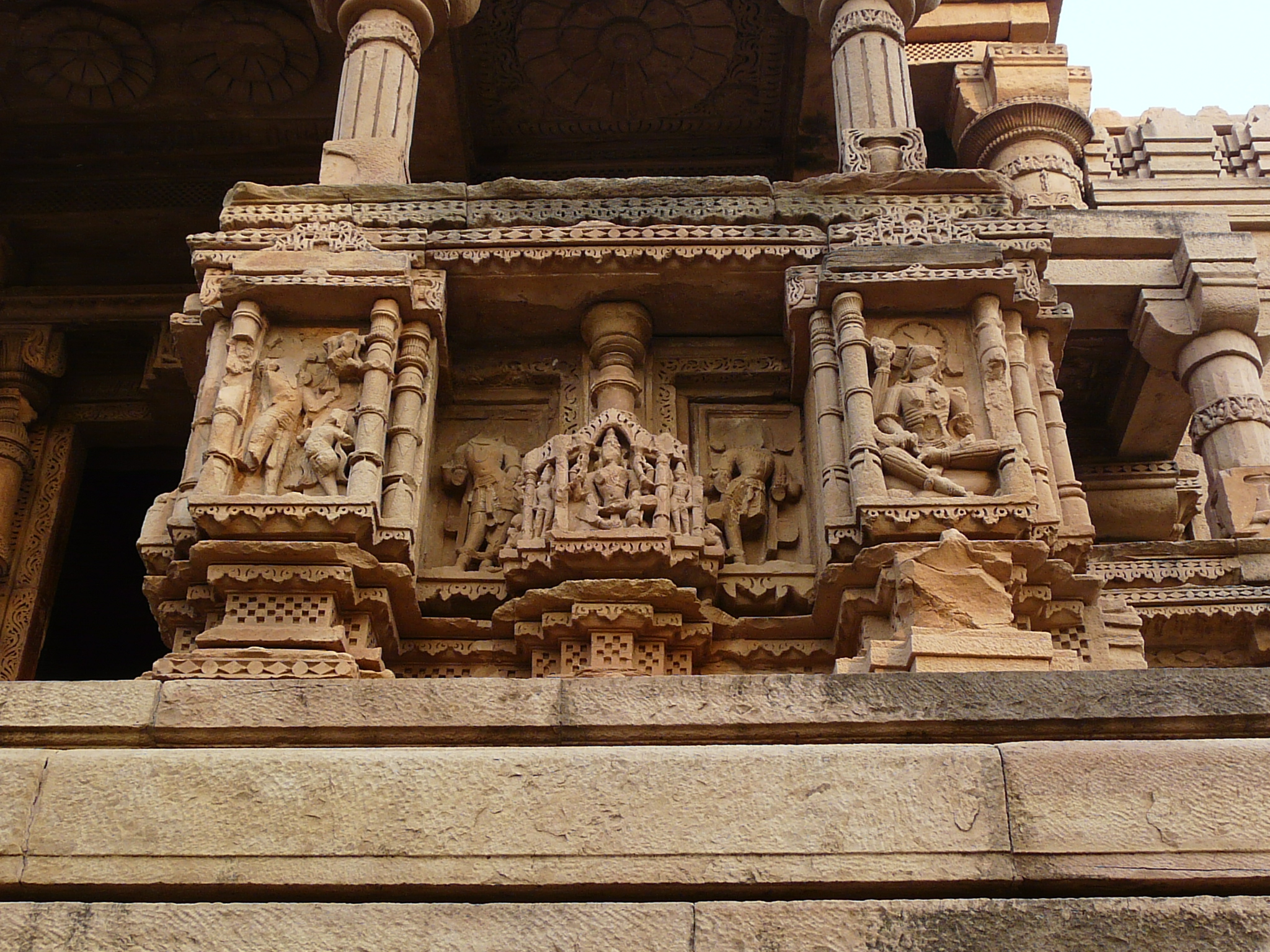
Damaged friezes

Bahu temple (smaller)

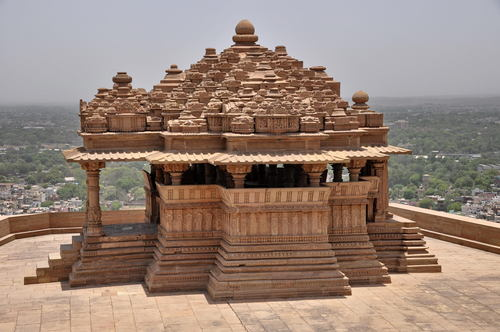
The smaller of the twin temple

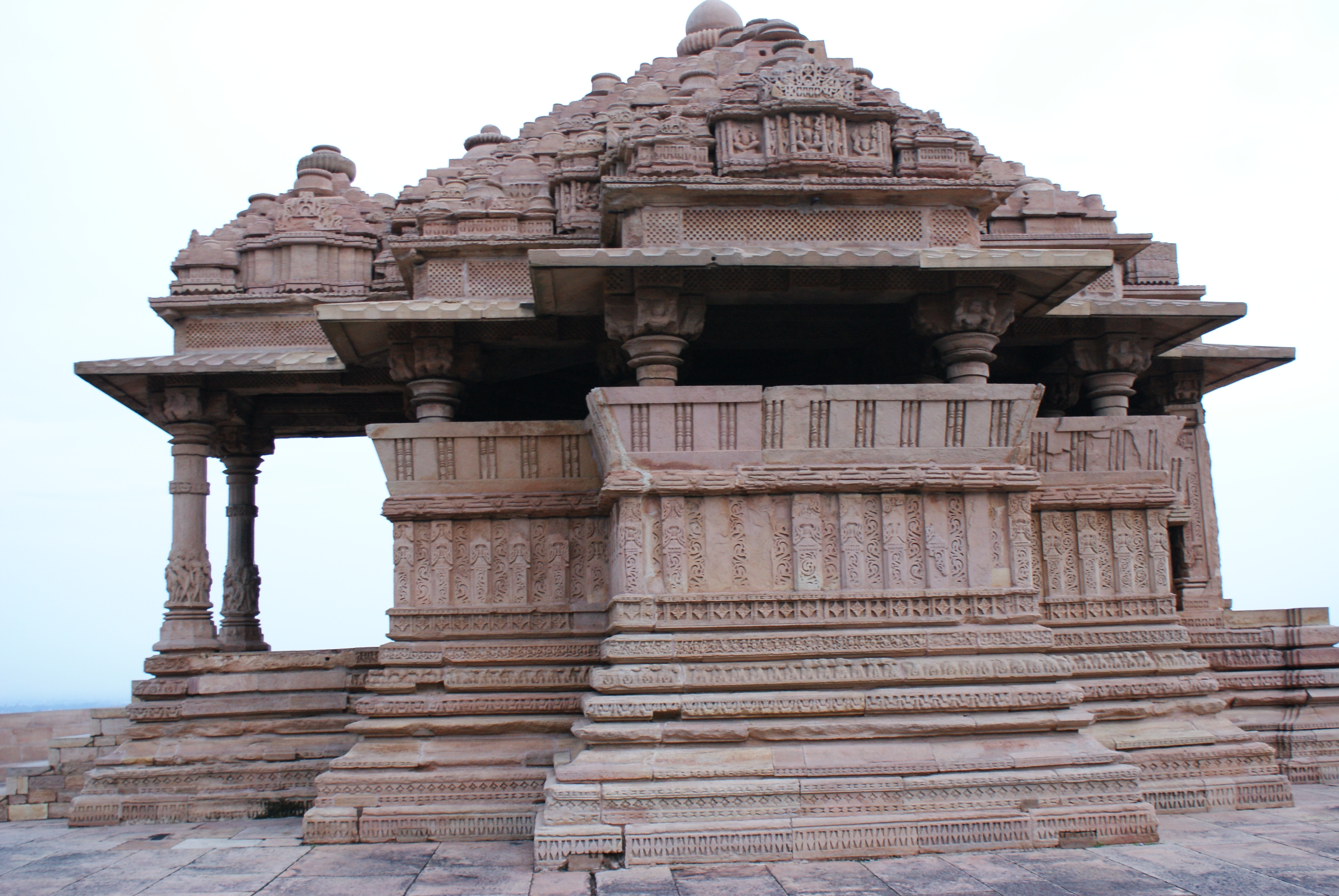
The lower level sculptures are defaced, some upper level survive

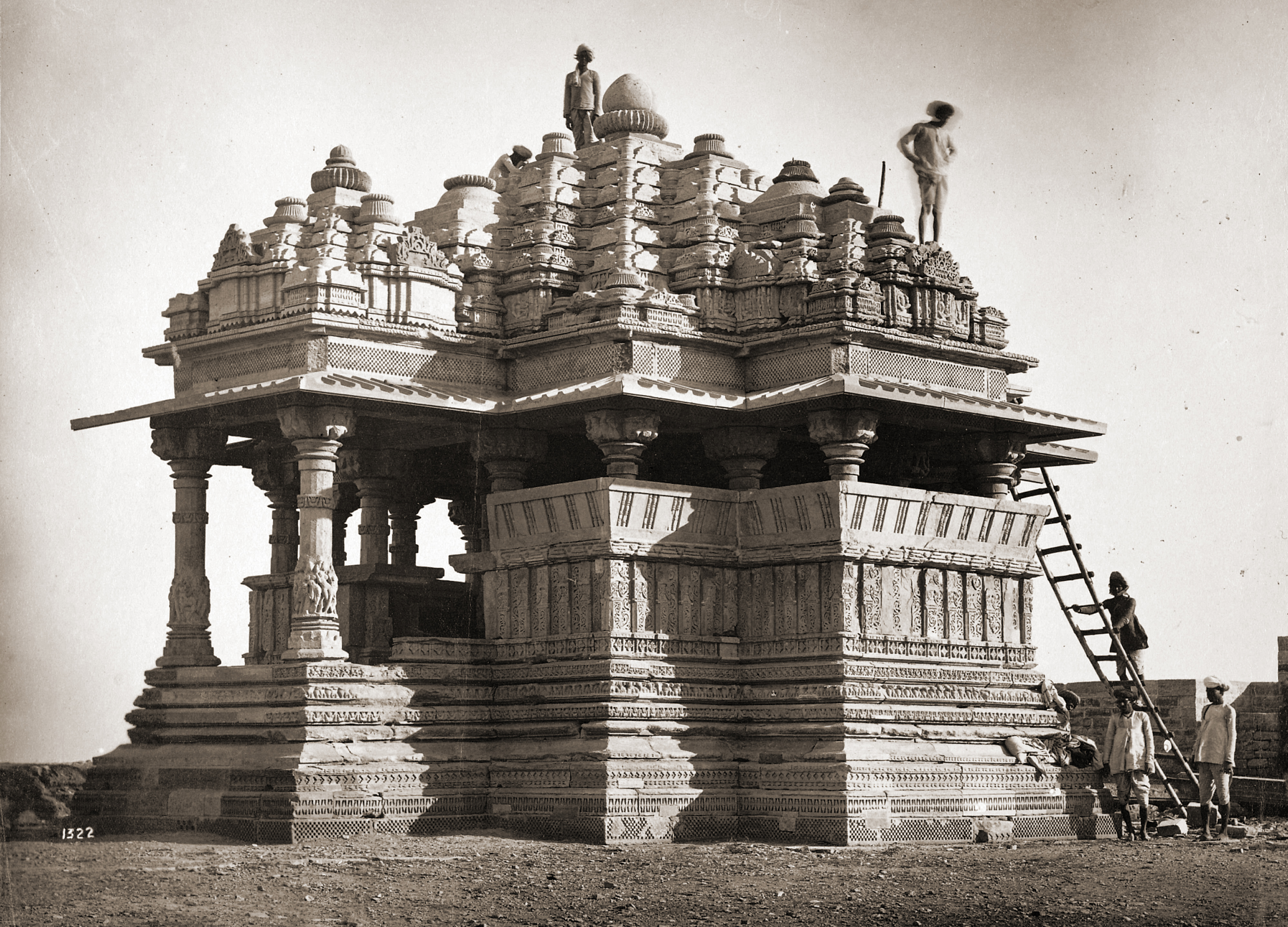
The temple in 1885

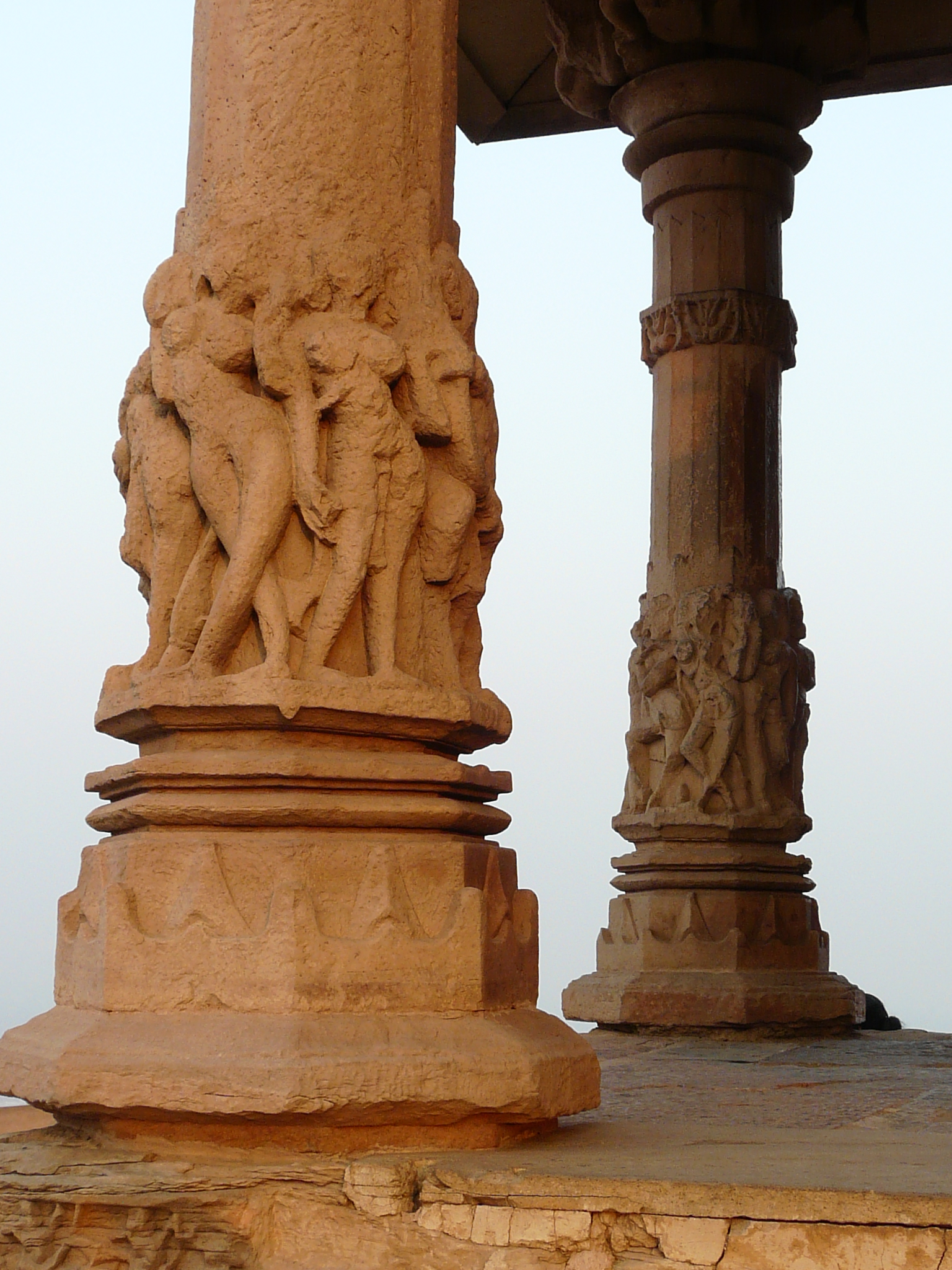
The mandapa entrance pillar carvings of women (defaced)

== Artwork ==
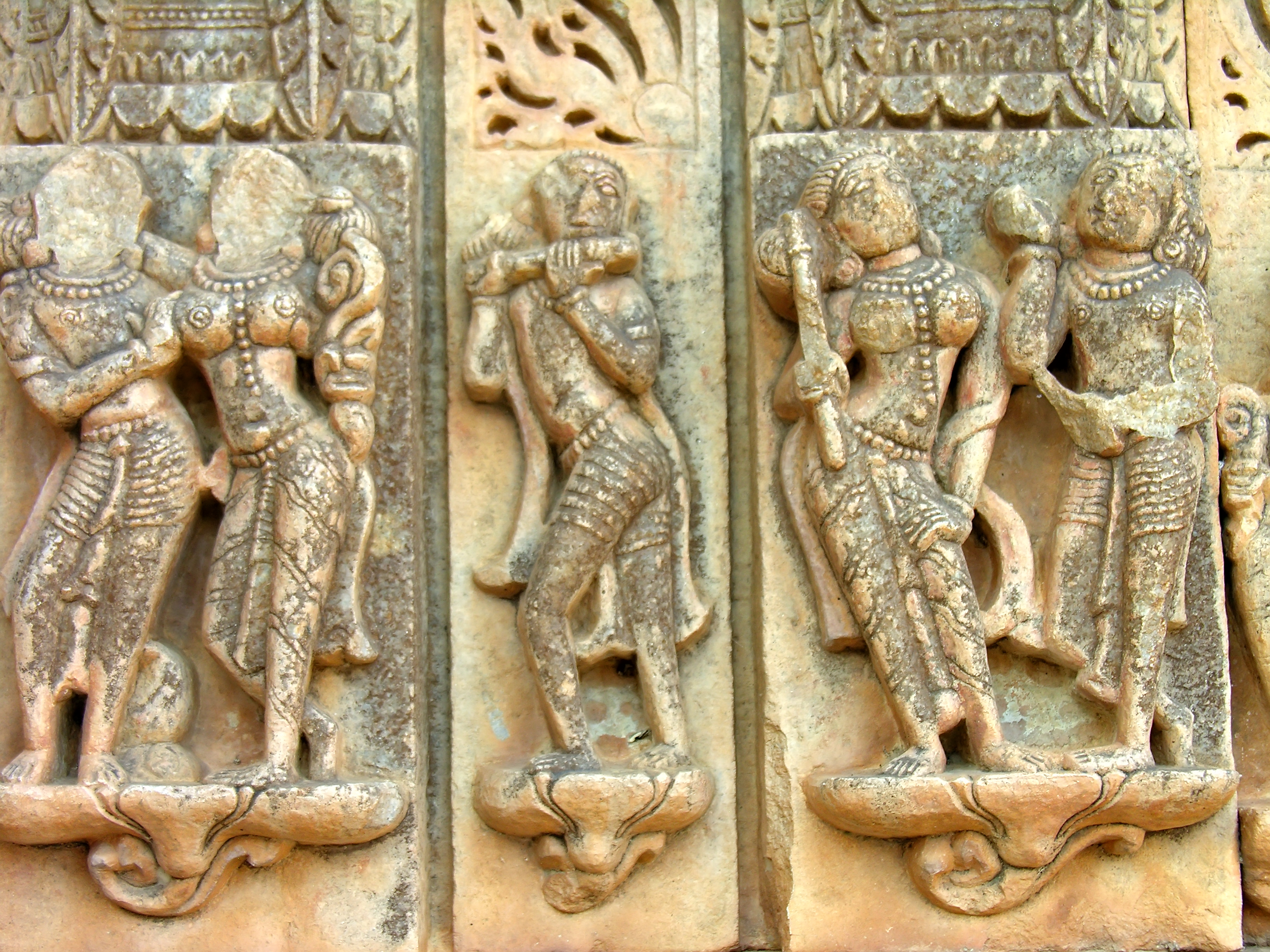
Vandalized artwork. From left: Amorous couple, man with flute, woman with veena, man.

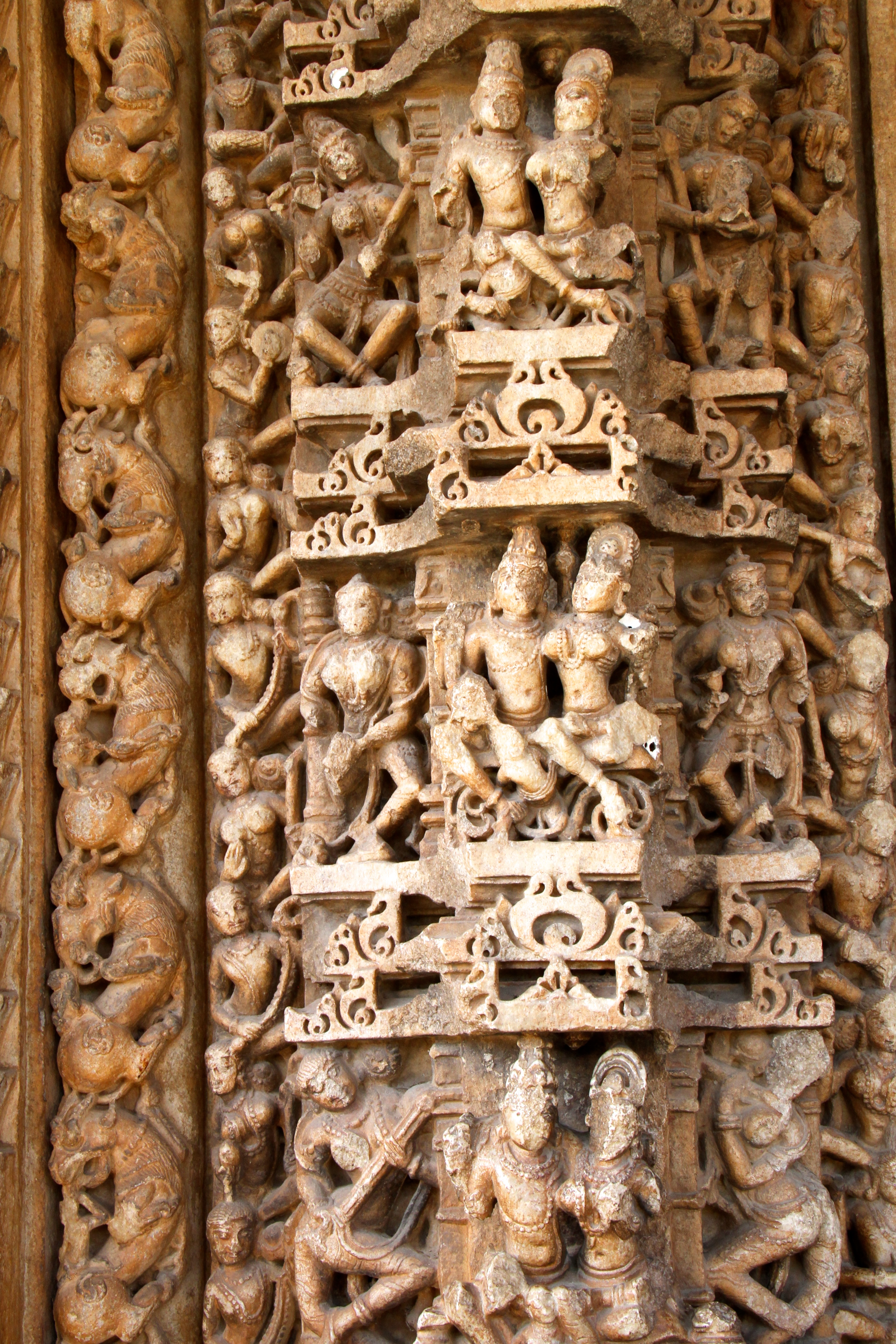
Scene with a row of couples surrounded by rows of musicians.

== See also ==
- Siddhachal Caves
- Telika Mandir
