= Kachchhapaghata dynasty =

Dynasty in modern-day India

Kachchhapaghatas
- c. 950–c.1196
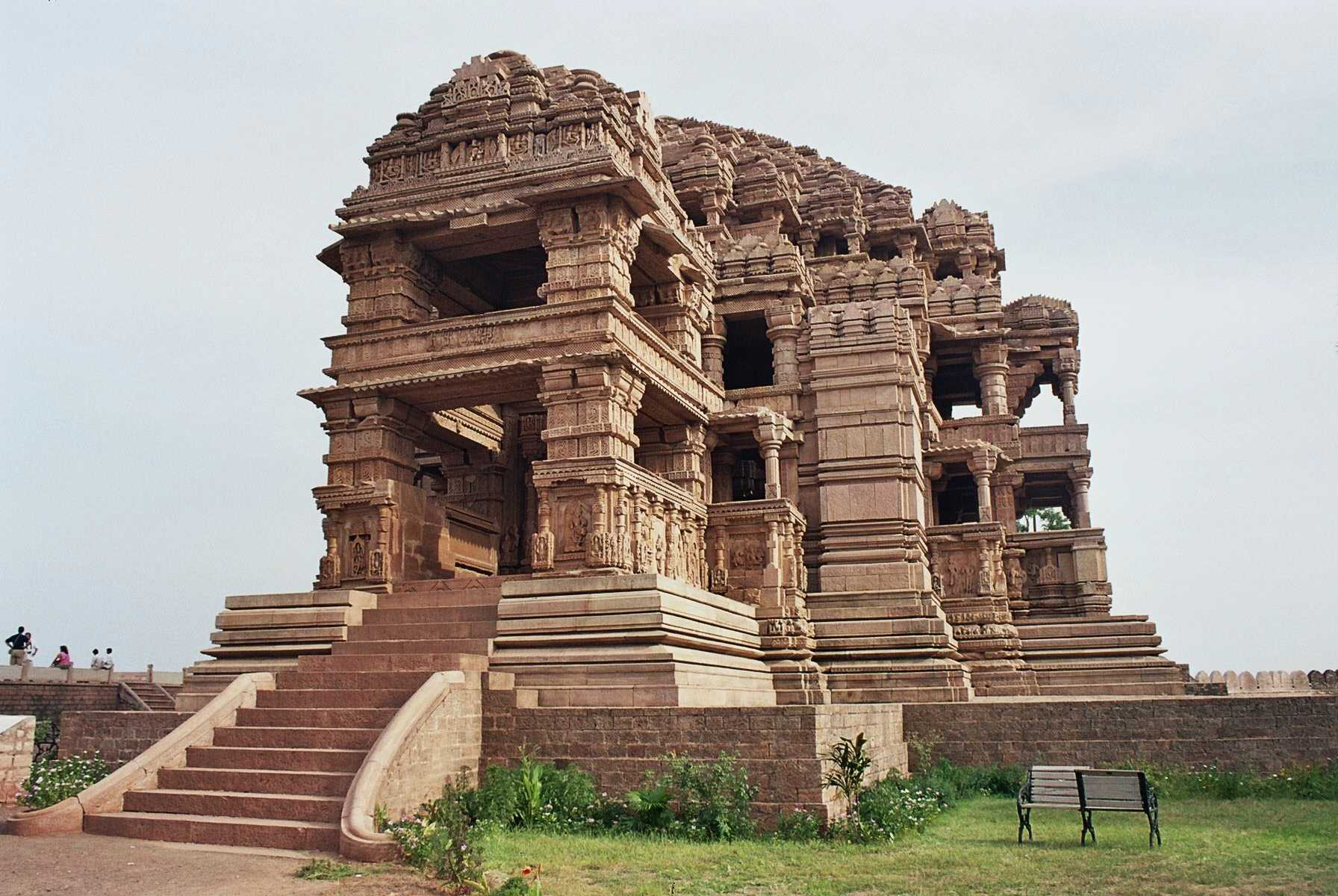
- The Sasbahu Temple, Gwalior, built in 1096 CE by Kachchhapaghata dynasty ruler Mahipala (r. c. 1090–1105).

- Location of the Kachchhapaghata dynasty, and main contemporary South Asian polities in 1175, on the eve of the Ghurid Empire invasion of the subcontinent.
- Capital: Gwalior
- Common languages: Sanskrit
- Religion: Hinduism
- Government: Monarchy
- Historical era: Medieval India
  - Established: c. 950
  - Disestablished: c.1196
Preceded by
| Gurjara-Pratihara dynasty |
Succeeded by
| Jaipur State |
| Ghurid dynasty |
| Mamluk dynasty (Delhi) |
- Today part of: India

Find spots of the Kachchhapaghata inscriptions

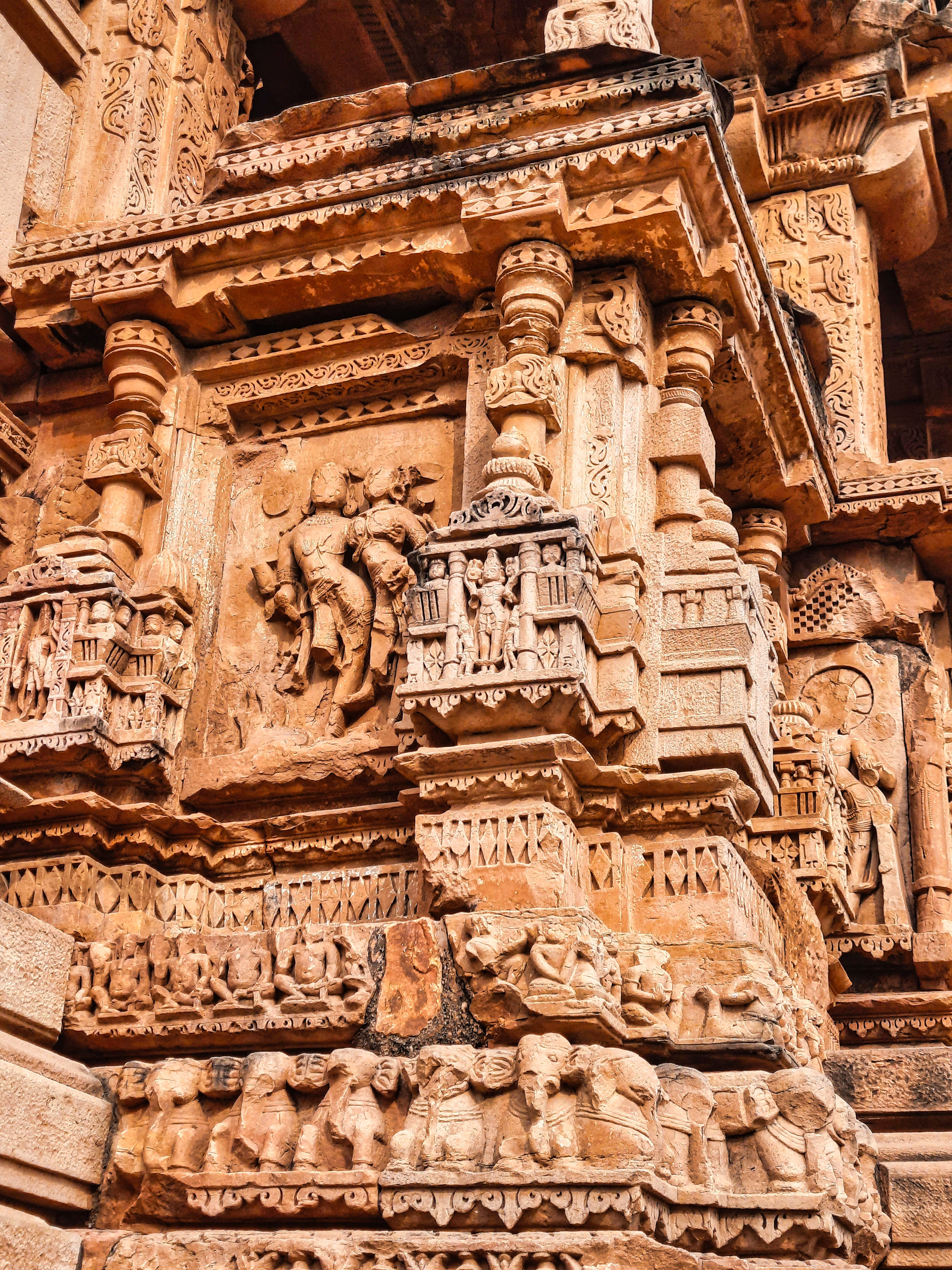
Sasbahu Temple detail.

The Kachchhapaghatas (IAST: Kacchapaghāta) were a Rajput Dynasty that ruled between 9th and 12th centuries. Their territory included North-Western parts of Central India (present-day Madhya Pradesh).

== History ==
The Sanskrit word Kachchhapa-ghata (कच्छपघात) literally means 'tortoise killer'. The Kachchhapaghatas were originally the vassals of the Gurjara Pratiharas and the Chandelas. They became powerful towards the end of the 10th century. After the death of the Chandela king Vidyadhara in 1035 CE, the Chandela kingdom was weakened by repeated Muslim Ghaznavid (Yamini) invasions. Taking advantage of this situation, the Kachchhapaghatas gave up their allegiance to the Chandelas.

A Sasbahu temple inscription suggests that Lakshmana was the first prominent member of the dynasty. This inscription, as well as a 977 Sihoniya inscription state that his successor Vajradaman captured Gopadri (Gwalior) from the king of Gadhinagara, that is the Pratihara ruler of Kannauj. Vajradaman, described as the tilaka of the dynasty in Gwalior inscriptions dated 1093-94 and 1104, was probably the first powerful ruler of the dynasty. He served as a feudatory to the Chandela kings Dhanga and Vidyadhara.

The dynasty was divided into three branches, which ruled from Gwalior (Gopādri-giri), Dubkunda (Chaṇdobha), and Narwar (Nalapur). Virasimha (also Virasimharama or Virasimhadeva), a Kachchhapaghata ruler of Nalapura, issued a copper plate grant in 1120-21. This record describes him using the high-status royal title Maharajadhiraja. Gold coins issued by him have also been discovered.

=== Downfall ===
According to bardic tradition, the last ruler of the dynasty was Tejaskarana (alias Dulha Rai or Dhola Rai), the hero of the romantic tale Dhola Maru. This account states that he left Gwalior in 1128 to marry the daughter of a neighbouring ruler, after leaving Paramal-dev (or Paramardi-dev) in-charge of the Gwalior Fort. When he returned to Gwalior, Paramal refused to hand over the fort to him, and founded the Parihara dynasty which ruled Gwalior for 103 years. The Parihara ruler over Gwalior is also attested the 1150 inscription of Ramdeo and 1194 inscription of Lohanga-Deva. However, other inscriptions suggest that the Kachchhapaghatas ruled the area at least until 1155 CE. In addition, 1192 and 1194 inscriptions found at Gwalior show that the Kachchhapaghata ruler Ajayapala controlled Gwalior in the later years as well. Thus, the bardic account is not completely reliable, and the Parihara chiefs probably ruled Gwalior as feudatories of the Kachchhapaghatas.

Sulakshanapala, the last ruler of the dynasty, appears to have lost his kingdom to a Ghurid invasion. The Tajul-Ma'asir suggests the Ghurid general Qutb al-Din Aibak invaded Gwalior in 1196, and extracted tribute from Sulakshanapala (whom Tajul-Ma'asir labels Solankhapala of Parihar family). The invaders took over Gwalior fort in the same year.

The Kachchhapaghatas are the ancestors of Kachhwaha of Amber. Although the Kachwaha inscriptions claim a different origin for their dynasty i.e. from Kachhapa family which is likely the shortened form of Kachhapaghata itself. Strong traditions of bardic accounts such as Dhola Maru suggest that the Kachwaha dynasty of Amber originated from the Tejaskarana, the last ruler of the Narwar branch of the Kachchhapaghata dynasty.

== Rulers ==
The following is a list of known Kachchhapaghata rulers, with estimate of their reigns:

Simhapaniya (Sihoniya) and Gopadri (Gwalior) branch

- Lakshmana (r. c. 950–975)
- Vajradaman (r. c. 975–1000)
- Mangalaraja (r. c. 1000–1015)
- Kirtiraja (r. c. 1015–1035)
- Muladeva (r. c. 1035–1055)
- Devapala (r. c. 1055–1085)
- Padmapala (r. c. 1085–1090)
- Mahipala (r. c. 1090–1105)
- Ratnapala (r. c. 1105–1130)
- Ajayapala (r. c. 1192–1194)
- Sulakshanapala (r. c. 1196)

Dubkund (Dobha) branch

- Yuvaraja (r. c. 1000)
- Arjuna (r. c. 1015–1035)
- Abhimanyu (r. c. 1035–1045)
- Vijayapala (r. c. 1045–1070)
- Vikramasimha (r. c. 1070–1100)

Nalapura (Narwar) branch

- Gaganasimha (r. c. 1075–1090)
- Sharadasimha (r. c. 1090–1105)
- Virasimha (r. c. 1105–1125)
- Tejaskarana

== Art and architecture ==
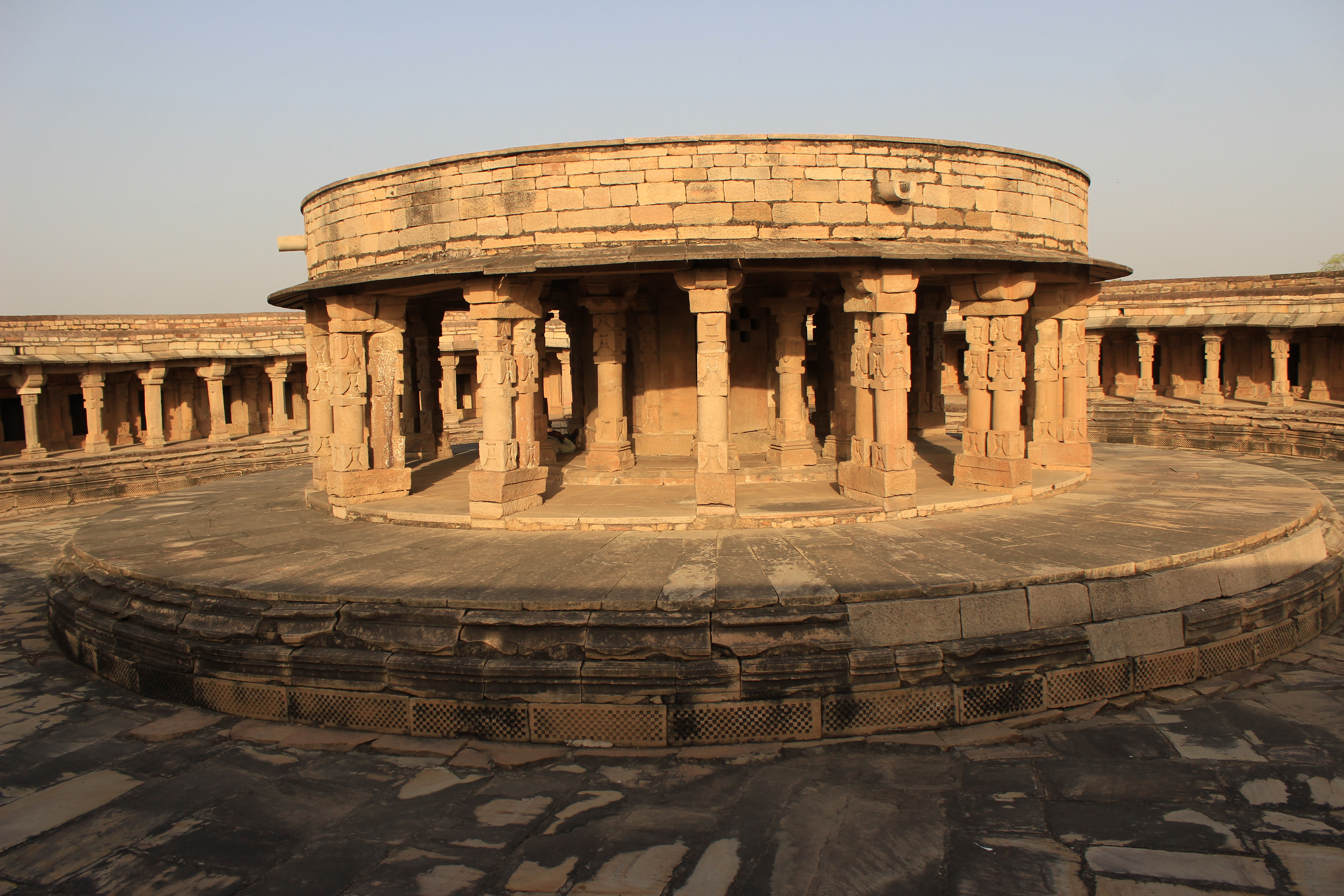
The Chausath Yogini temple in Mitaoli village built by the Kachchhapaghata King Devapala (r. c. 1055 – 1075).

The dynasty patronized Shaivism and Vaishnavism, but were tolerant towards Buddhism and Jainism. Several temples were constructed during their reign in Kadwaha.

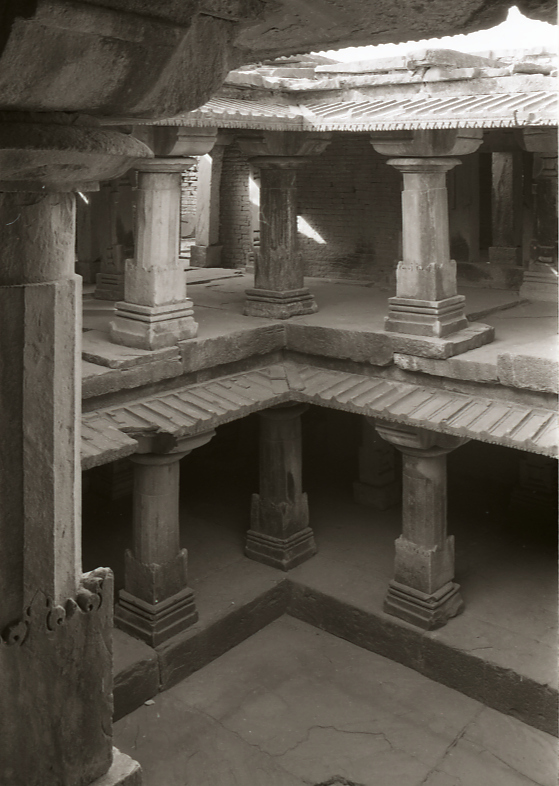
Matha (monastery), Kadwaha

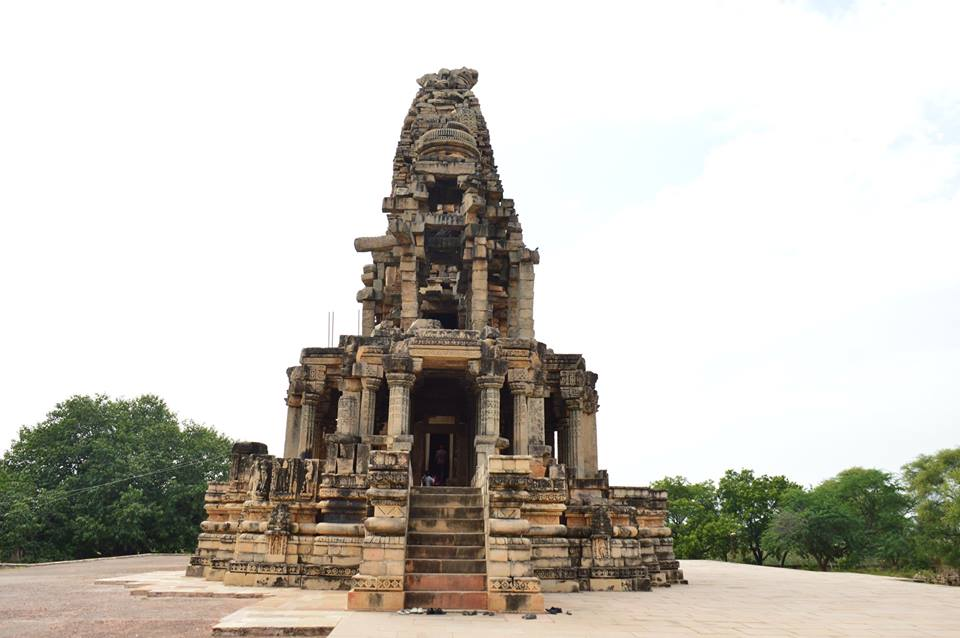
Kakanmath, Sihoniya

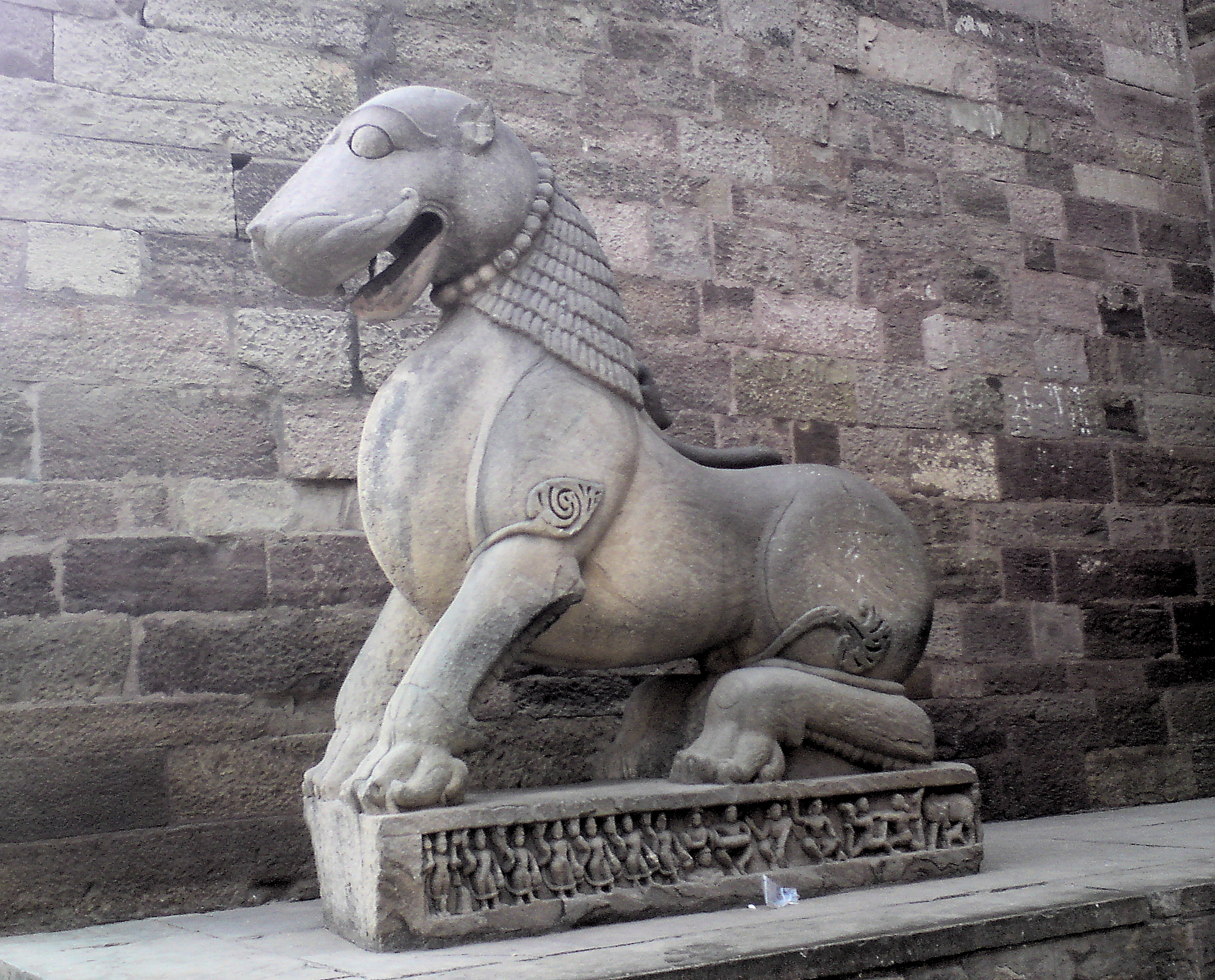
One of the lion figures from the Sihoniya Kakanmaṭh temple, now at the Archaeological Museum, Gwalior

The Kachchhapaghatas of Gwalior are especially noted for their art and architecture. Kachchhapaghata ruler Mahipala commissioned the Sas-Bahu Temple at Gwalior. Records of two grants issued by him at Gwalior, dated 1093 and 1104 CE, have been found. Several silver and gold coins issued by him have also been discovered. Ajayapala (r. c. 1192–1194) had the Gangola tank of Gwalior desilted, as attested by an 1194 inscription.

Other temples constructed by the Gwalior branch include the ones located at:

- Kadwaha (Kadmbaguhā) in Ashok Nagar district
- Surawaya
- Mahua
- Terahi (Terambhi) in Shivpuri district
- Sihoniya (Simhapāniyā)
- Padhaoli
- Mitaoli in Morena district
- Kherata in Bhind district
