= Sihoniya =

- town
- Location in Madhya Pradesh, India
- Coordinates: 26.573333°N 78.265278°E
- Country: India
- State: Madhya Pradesh
- District: Morena

Languages
  - Official: Hindi
- Time zone: UTC+5:30 (IST)
- PIN: 476554

Sihoniya is a town in Morena district, in the Indian state of Madhya Pradesh. The town is sometimes referred to as Suhania; in medieval times it was called Siṃhapānīya. The settlement has a long history and a number of notable monuments, one being of national importance and protected by the Archaeological Survey of India.

== History ==
The history of Sihoniya goes back to at least the ninth century as shown by the remains of temple ruins and fragments dating to the time of the Gurjara-Pratihara dynasty. Subsequently, it was one of the chief centres of the Kacchapaghātas. Epigraphic testimony for the presence of the Kacchapaghāta rulers comes from a record on the base of Jain image which is dated Vikrama year 1034/CE 977–78 and mentions Mahārājādhirāja Vajradāman (Kacchapaghāta). Sihoniya declined after the twelfth century, but it featured nonetheless in later poetic accounts of the Tomar rulers.

== Transport ==
Sihoniya is connected by bus service from Morena and Ambah.

== Monuments ==
The monuments of Sihoniya were first studied by M. B. Garde and published in the reports of the archaeological department of Gwalior State. The data in these reports were compiled into a list prepared in 1952.

=== Śiva temple ===
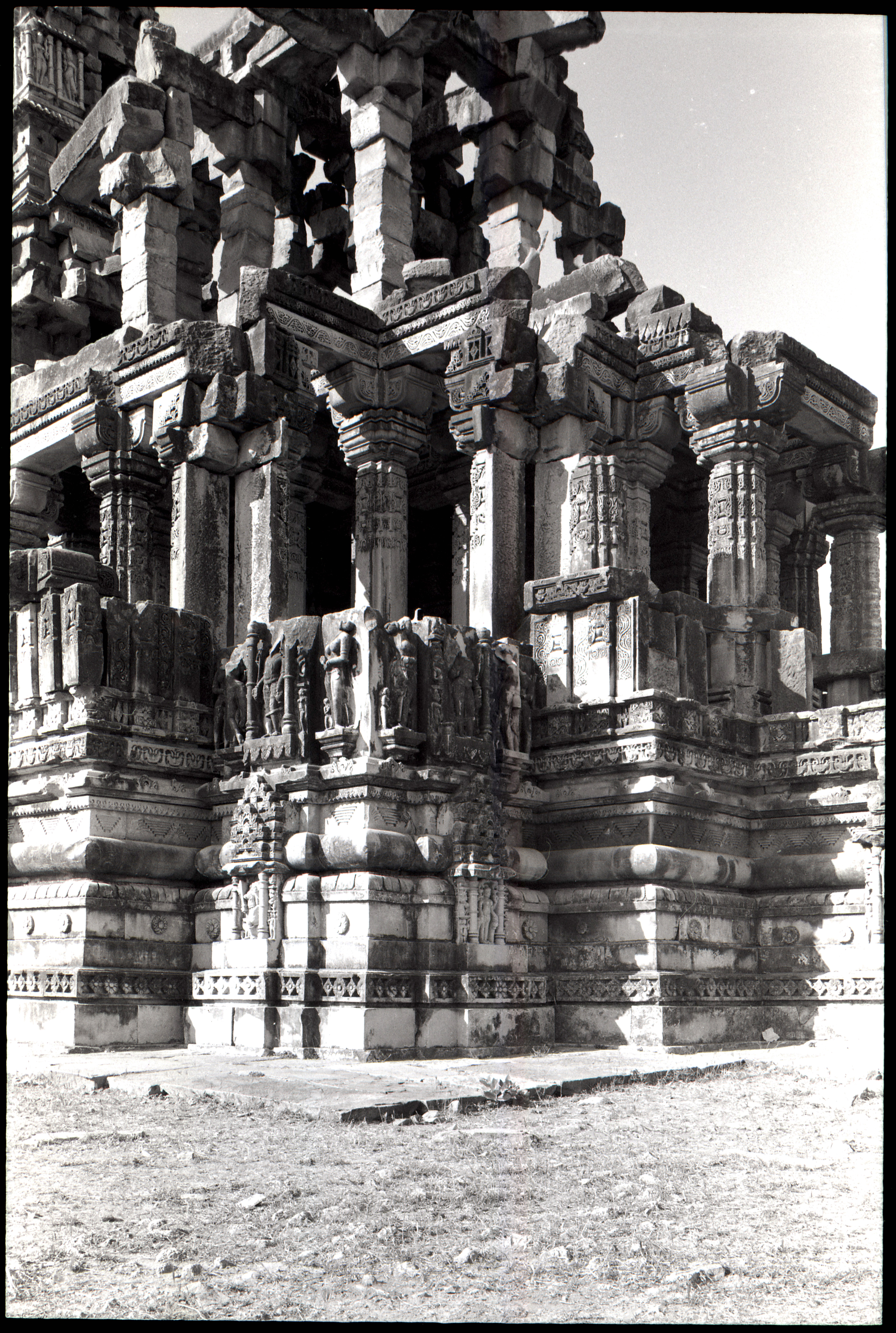
Kakanmaṭh temple, Sihoniya, maṇḍapa from the south east, as the monument stood in 1980.

The most important temple at Sihoniya is that dedicated to Śiva and known today as the Kakanmaṭh. It is under the protection of the Archaeological Survey of India. The temple was built on a vast scale in the eleventh century and is one of the only surviving royal temples of the Kacchapaghāta dynasty. The Sās Bahū temple inscription at Gwalior records that the temple was built by Kīrtirāja, a Kacchapaghāta king who ruled between circa CE 1015-35:

adbhutaḥ siṁhapānīya nagare yena kāritaḥ |
kirttistaṁbha ivabhāti prāsādaḥ pāvartati̇pateḥ ||11||

In the town of Siṁhapānīya was caused to be built by him [Kīrtirāja],
An extraordinary temple Pārvati’s Lord, which shines forth like a column of glory.

The Kakanmaṭh appears to have been ruined in about the thirteenth century, losing the outer facing stones on the spire and the roof of the maṇḍapa. One of the pillars has an inscription dated Vikrama 1[4]50 recording the renovation of the Mahādev temple (i.e. Kakanmaṭh) by an individual named Durgāprasāda. The temple also has a number of votive records, for example one dated Vikrama year 1497/CE 1440-41 from the time of Ḍungar Dev Tomar that mentions Dekhaṇa, son of Kakala, who was a resident of Nalapuragaḍha (possibly modern Narwar).

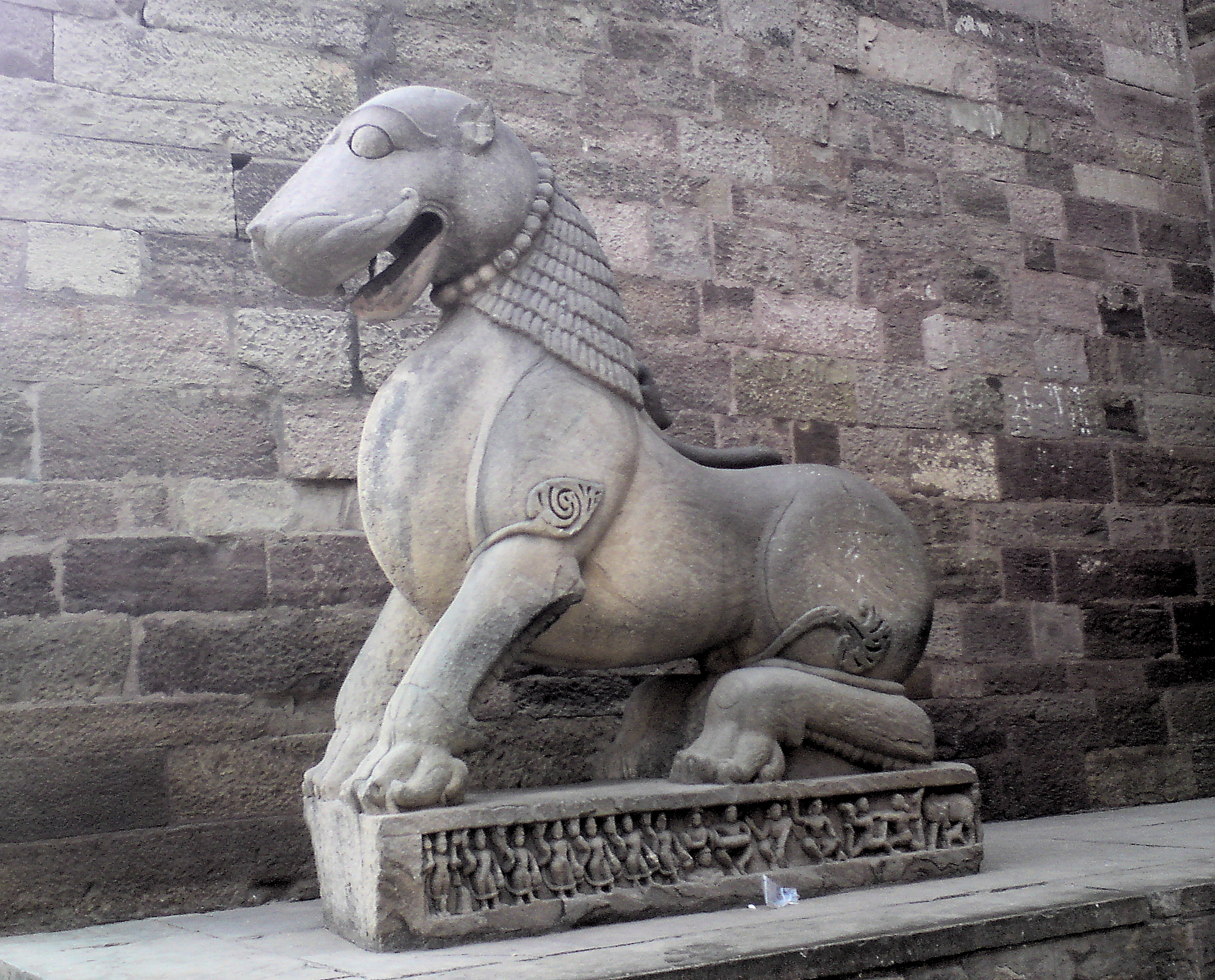
One of the lion figures from Kakanmaṭh now at the Archaeological Museum, Gwalior

Two massive stone lions once marked the eastern entrance; these now flank the gatehouse of the Archaeological Museum in Gwalior. Many sculptures of Hindu deities from Kakanmaṭh are also preserved in the museum.

=== Ambikā Devī temple ===
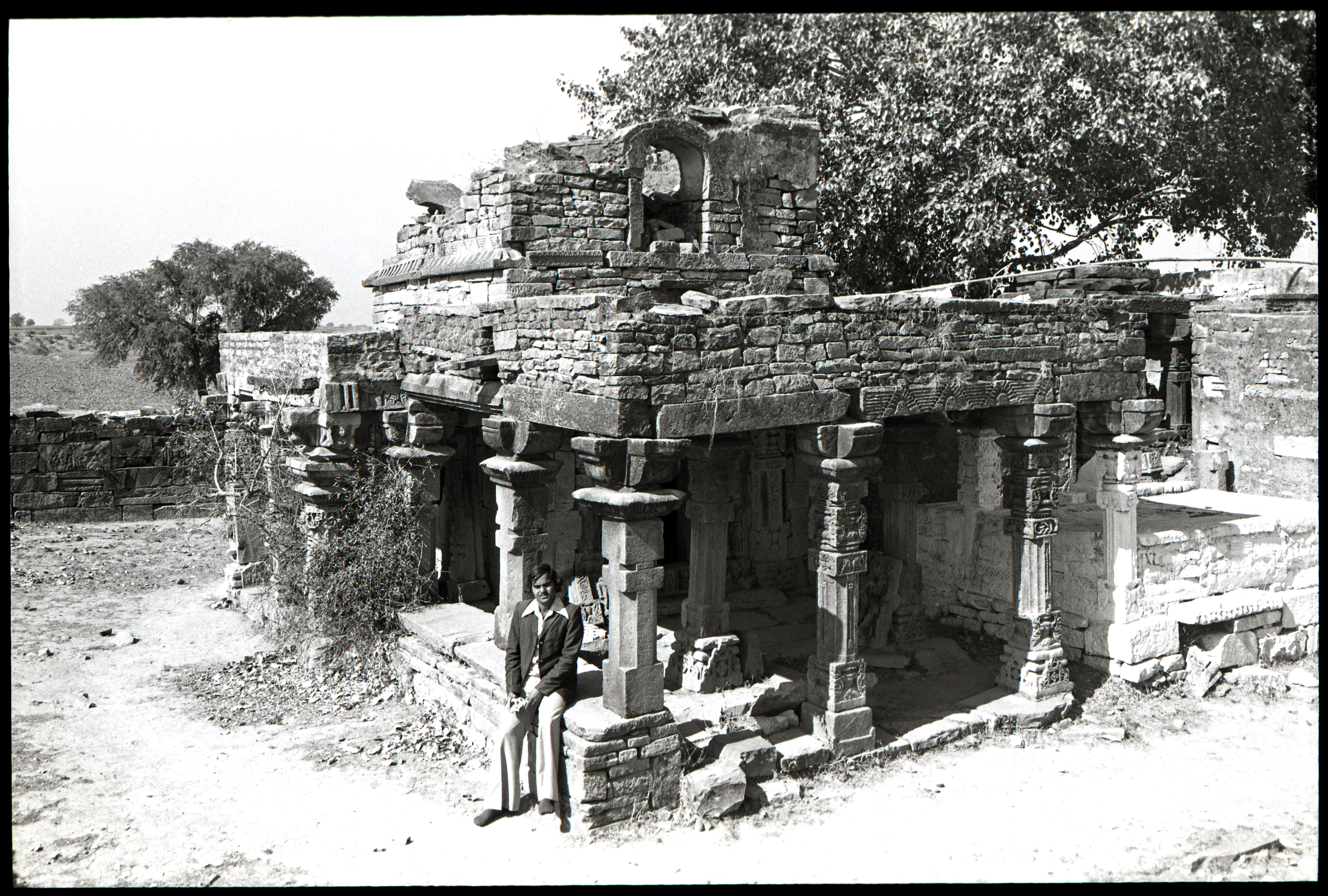
Ambikā Devī complex, Sihoniya, general view of the subsidiary shrine as the monument stood in 1980.

The most significant temple in the town is dedicated to Ambikā Devī. The complex consists of two temples side-by-side, surrounded by a perimeter wall. The buildings are made of re-constituted and re-organised architectural fragments of various dates ranging from the ninth to the thirteenth centuries. An inscription dated Vikrama year 1467/CE 1410-11 on one of the pillars mentioning Mahārājādhirāja Śrī Vīrama (Vīraṅga) Dev Tomar and sūtradhāra Haridās may record the construction of portions of the current structure. Other inscriptions bear the date Vikrama year 1516.

In his Gopācala ākhyāna, a seventeenth-century chronicle of the kings of Gwalior, the poet Khargrāy devoted several verses to the Ambikā Devī, describing its features and noting it was the resort of worthy and religious men:

Bāmhan paḍhai ved dhuni bhaī | maṭh kī nīū tabai nṛp daī ||

daī nīū maṭh liyau banāī | tākī upamā kahī na jāī ||

causaṭ khām satakhanai ṭhaye | tā mahi kuṅḍ mahā dvai bhaye ||

gaṅgā jamunā kau jalu līyau | tāmai āni ḍāri so dīyau ||

aru tāmai bahu citra banāī | citra devalokani ke bhāī ||

khirakī āṭh cāri darabār | bane jharokhā aganit pār ||

ām āmalī bahu phulavāī | cahu dis tahāṅ karī bagavāī ||

phūlat kamal sarovar ghanai | pahup keli pahupani chabi ghanai ||

The Brahmin read the Vedic chants, the King then laid the temple foundation.

Laying the foundation he built the temple; I am unable to sing its praise.

Sixty-four pillars were dug and erected. There were also two great tanks.

Taking the waters of Ganga-Yamuna, he filled them up.

Eight windows and four courts, countless jharokhās were made.

Mango-Amla trees were planted, in all four directions gardens were set up.

Lotuses were spread over deep lakes, flowers playful and utterly charming.

=== Jain temple ===
Immediately south of Sihoniya is a prominent Jain temple and complex, the Digambar Atishay Kṣetra. Jain stone images from the area have been collected and stored here.
