= Cave paintings in India =

Cave paintings in India

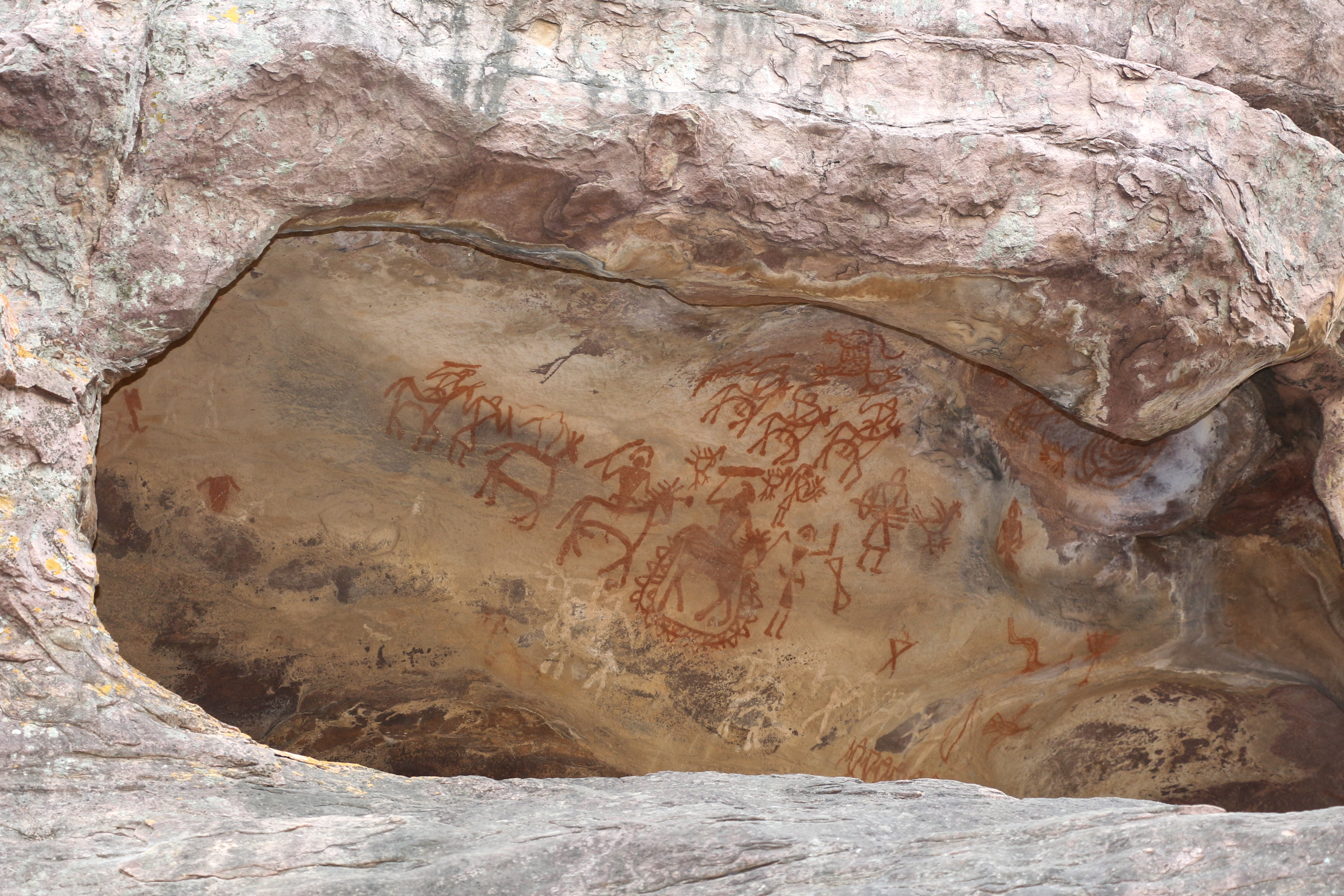
Cave painting at Bhimbetka

The history of cave paintings in India or rock art range from drawings and paintings from prehistoric times, beginning in the caves of Central India, typified by those at the Bhimbetka rock shelters from around 10,000 BP, to elaborate frescoes at sites such as the rock-cut artificial caves at Ajanta and Ellora, extending as late as 6th–10th century CE.

== Paleolithic art ==
=== Haryana ===
Archaeologists discovered cave paintings and tools in Mangar Bani hill forest in May 2021; the cave paintings are estimated to be 10,000 years old. These are believed to be the largest in the Indian subcontinent and possibly the world's oldest. It is likely the largest paleolithic site in the Indian subcontinent and this is the first time cave paintings have been found in Aravalli. According to the Haryana Archaeology and Museums Department, "On the basis of this exploration, it can be said that this may be one of the biggest Palaeolithic sites in the Indian sub-continent, where stone age tools were recovered from different open-air sites as well as from rock shelters. Though tools from the Palaeolithic Age have been identified earlier in parts of the Aravallis, it is for the first time that cave paintings and rock art of a large magnitude have been found in Haryana."

Cave painting is a type of rock art that includes petroglyphs, or engravings, found on the wall or ceilings of caves. Mangarbani hill forest is a Palaeolithic site with rock art as well as cave paintings. It is believed to be the largest in the Indian subcontinent and possibly the world's oldest.

On the basis of tool topology, it can be said that the date of prehistoric habitation at the site may be from about 100,000 to about 15,000 years ago. But we have also found evidence of later habitation, even up to 8th–9th century AD

— Banani Bhattacharyya, Deputy Director of Haryana Archaeology & Museums Department., Prehistoric stone age site in Faridabad’s Mangar Bani could a lakh years old: Archaeologists, The Indian Express.

=== Karnataka ===
Cave paintings are found in Hiregudda which is near Badami.

=== Madhya Pradesh ===
==== Bhimbetka ====
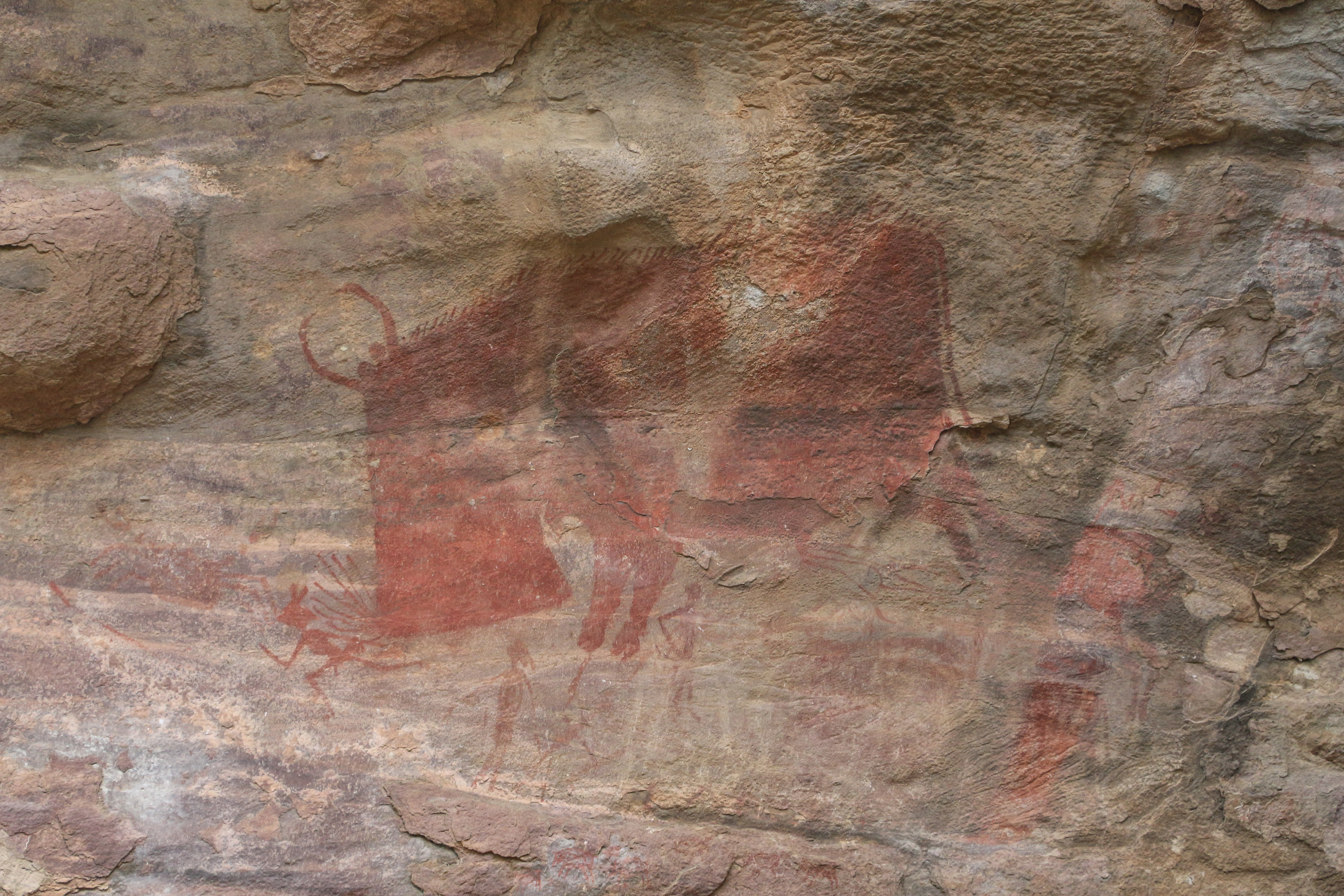
A man being hunted by a horned boar. Cave painting at Bhimbetka.

The Bhimbetka rock shelters are an archaeological site in the state of Madhya Pradesh in central India that spans several prehistoric periods. It exhibits the earliest traces of human life on the Indian subcontinent and evidence of Stone Age habitation starting at the site in Acheulian times. It is located in the Raisen District southeast of Bhopal. Bhimbetka is a UNESCO world heritage site that consists of seven hills and over 750 rock shelters distributed over 10 kilometres (6.2 mi). At least some of the shelters were inhabited more than 100,000 years ago.

Some of the Bhimbetka rock shelters feature prehistoric cave paintings of which the oldest date from 10,000 years BP, corresponding to the Indian Mesolithic. The paintings show themes such as animals, and early evidence of dancing and hunting. The Bhimbetka site has the oldest known rock art in the Indian subcontinent, and is one of the largest prehistoric complexes.

=== Odisha ===
Odisha has the richest repository of rock art in Eastern India. The state has recorded more than a hundred rock shelters with rock paintings and engravings. Numerous geometric symbols, dots and lines are found along with animals, and human paintings and engravings dating from late Pleistocene onwards. Many of the geometric shape and patterns found in rock art of Odisha are enigmatic in nature. Painted figures have been found executed in monochrome, red and white or sometimes in combination with shades of yellow color.

==== Gudahandi ====
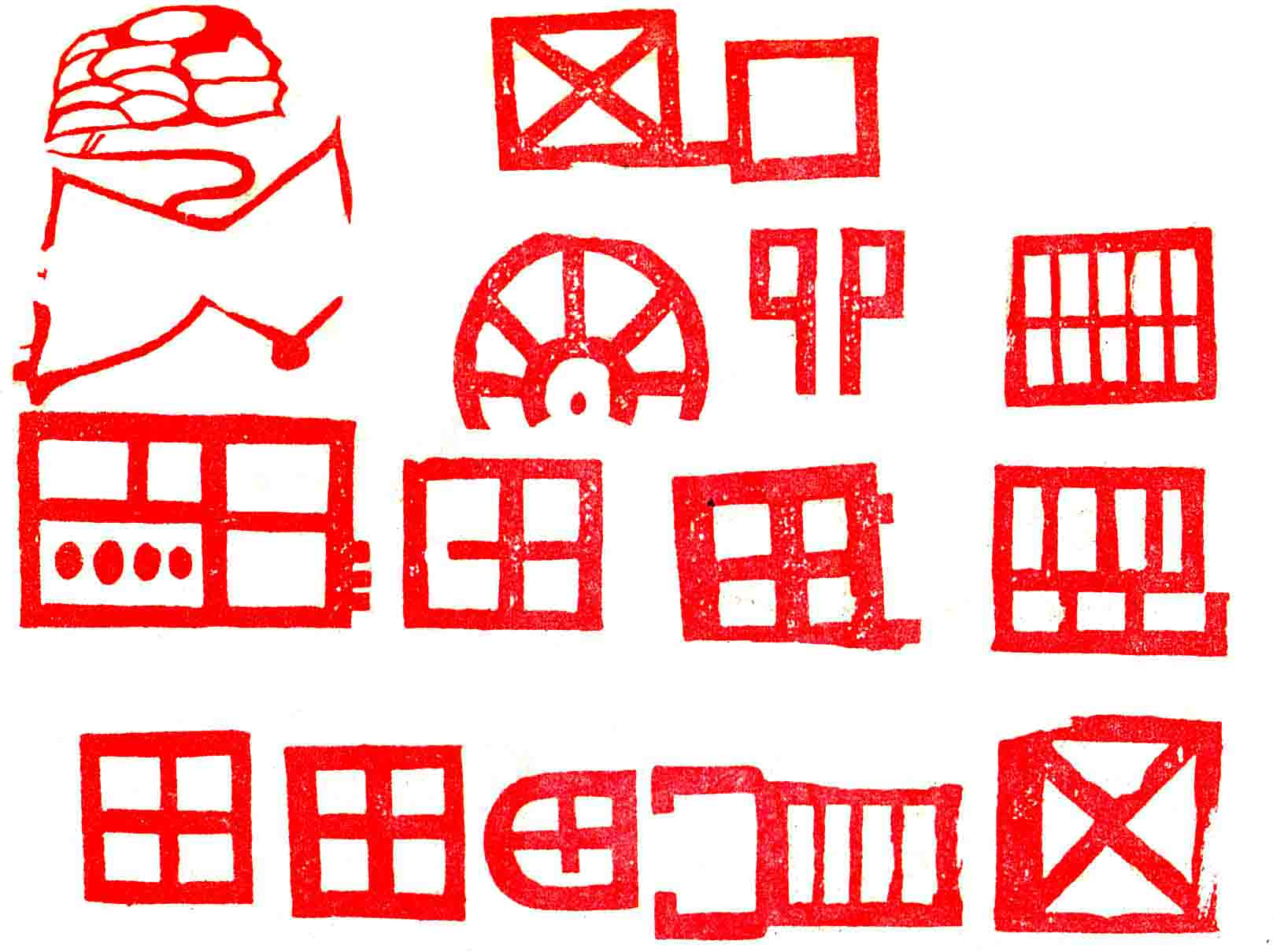
Gudahandi rock art of Odisha

The rock shelter of Gudahandi is located on the summit of the hillock and situated about 20 km from Block headquarters Koksara in Kalahandi district. The rock art shelter exhibits both monochrome and bi-chrome paintings of early historic period. It is the only reported rock art site of Kalahandi district. The rock art panel preserves the specimen of paintings which include a styl ized human figure in red, deer and a variety of geometric patterns of squares and rectangles either empty or in filled with straight and diagonal lines or with dots on the borders grid patterns, wheels with spokes, apsidal patterns, oval shapes with dots executed either in monochrome of red or in polychrome of red, blue and black.

==== Yogimatha ====
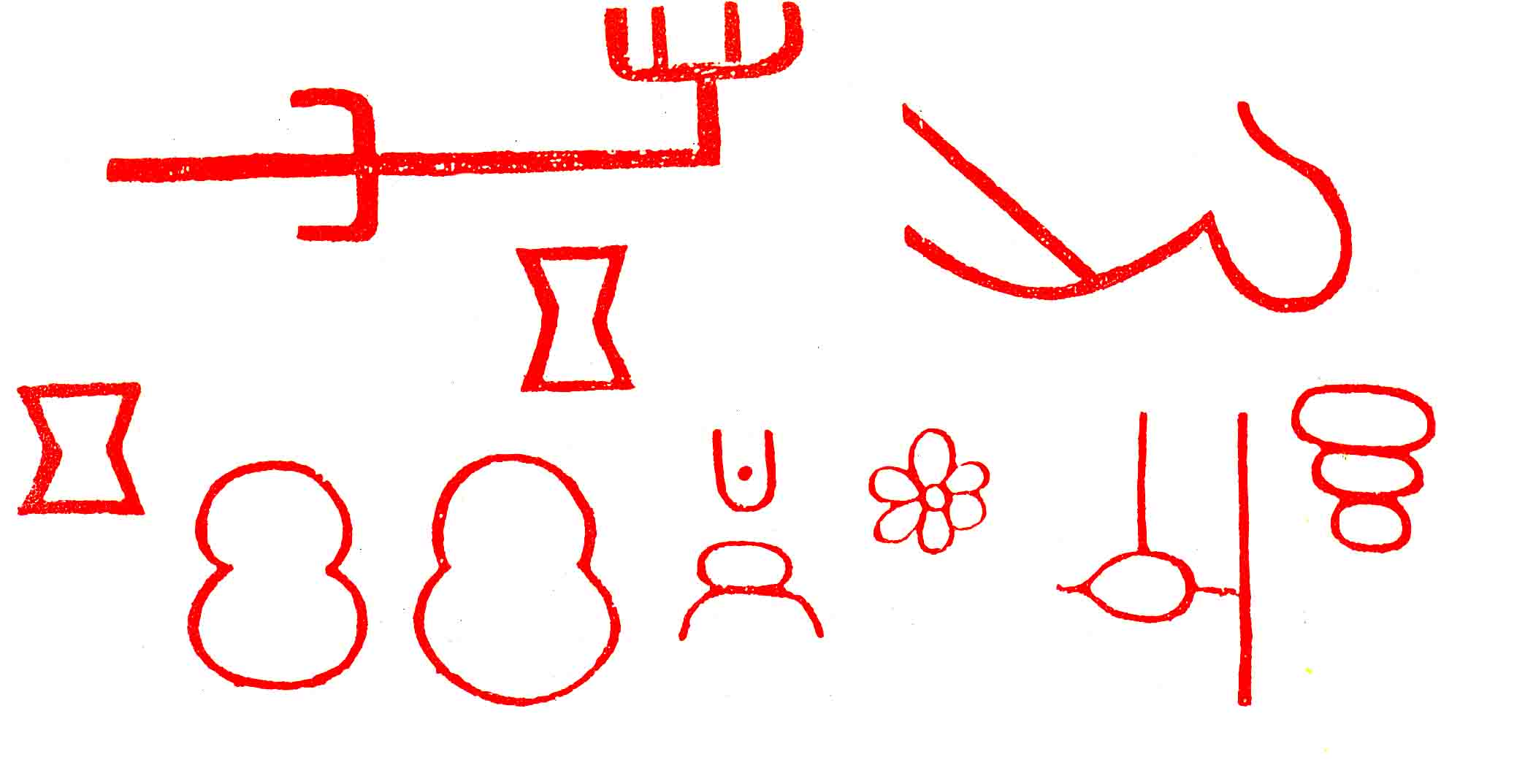
Yogimath rock art of Odisha

The rock painting of the Yogimatha (10th millennium BCE) of Nuapada District of Odisha which was an older script in India. The script 'Ga', and 'o' (tha) was discovered from Yogimatha rock painting, this painting saw a person with four animals and write some alphabet. That painting created a word Like "Gaitha" (very popular Odia word at present 'Gotha' or 'group' in English). This art closely related to this alphabet. This alphabet has similarity to Dhauli and Jaugada Inscription's script of Ashok. It was the ancient form of Indian script, and it is the first glimpse of possible origin of the Odia language and script.

=== Tamil Nadu ===
In Tamil Nadu, ancient Paleolithic cave paintings are found in Padiyendhal, Alampadi, Kombaikadu, Kilvalai, Settavarai and Nehanurpatti. The paintings have not been dated, but they could be around 30,000 to 10,000 years old, as they use similar art form of Bhimbetka rock shelters in Bhopal.

In the Nilgiri Hills, they are also found in Kumittipathi, Mavadaippu and Karikkiyur. In Theni District they are found in the Andipatti Hills.

Three prehistoric rock paintings in white ochre, believed to be approximately 2,500 years old, were discovered at Mealpattimalai, about 5 km from Krishnagiri town on the Krishnagiri–Maharajakadai road in Tamil Nadu. The paintings depict two human figures riding horses on either side of a boulder, with an unidentified symbol in the centre. Archaeologist Murugan suggested that the paintings may have been created in tribute to soldiers who died in a war. Krishnagiri district contains 16 known prehistoric rock art sites, many located on dolmens and the ceilings of rock shelters.

== Early medieval caves ==
There are known more than 10,000 locations around India containing murals from this period, mainly natural caves and rock-cut chambers. The highest achievements of this time are the caves of Ajanta, Bagh, Sittanavasal, Armamalai Cave (Tamil Nadu), Ravan Chhaya rock shelter, Kailasanatha temple in Ellora Caves.

=== Maharashtra ===
==== Ajanta frescoes ====
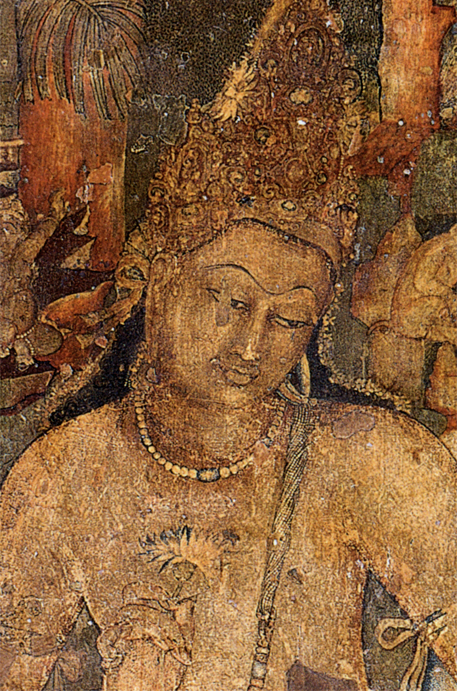
Mural of Padmapani in Ajanta Caves. India, 5th century

The Frescoes of Ajanta are paintings in the Ajanta Caves which are situated near Aurangabad in Maharashtra. The caves are carved out of large rocks. Inside many of the caves are frescoes.

Frescoes are paintings which are done on wet plaster in which colours become fixed as the plaster dries. The Ajanta Frescoes have a special importance of their own. They are found on the walls and ceilings at Ajanta. The paintings reflect different phases of Indian Culture from jain tirthankar mahaveer's birth to his nirvana in the 8th century AD.

The frescoes have degraded slightly, due to the effect of flash photography. Photography here is not banned. They depict themes of court life, feasting, processions, men and women at work, festivals, various natural scenes including animals, birds and flowers. The artists used shading to give a three-dimensional effect.

1500m away to the north of Ajanta, beautiful frescoes have been found. Though the themes in these paintings are both secular and religious, they do depict some aspect of Buddhist life and rituals. One of the most famous paintings show a procession of elephants. Another depicts a dancer and women musicians. These have been influenced by Ajanta style of paintings. These frescoes show a strong resemblance to the frescoes of Sigiriya in Sri Lanka.

==== Ellora ====
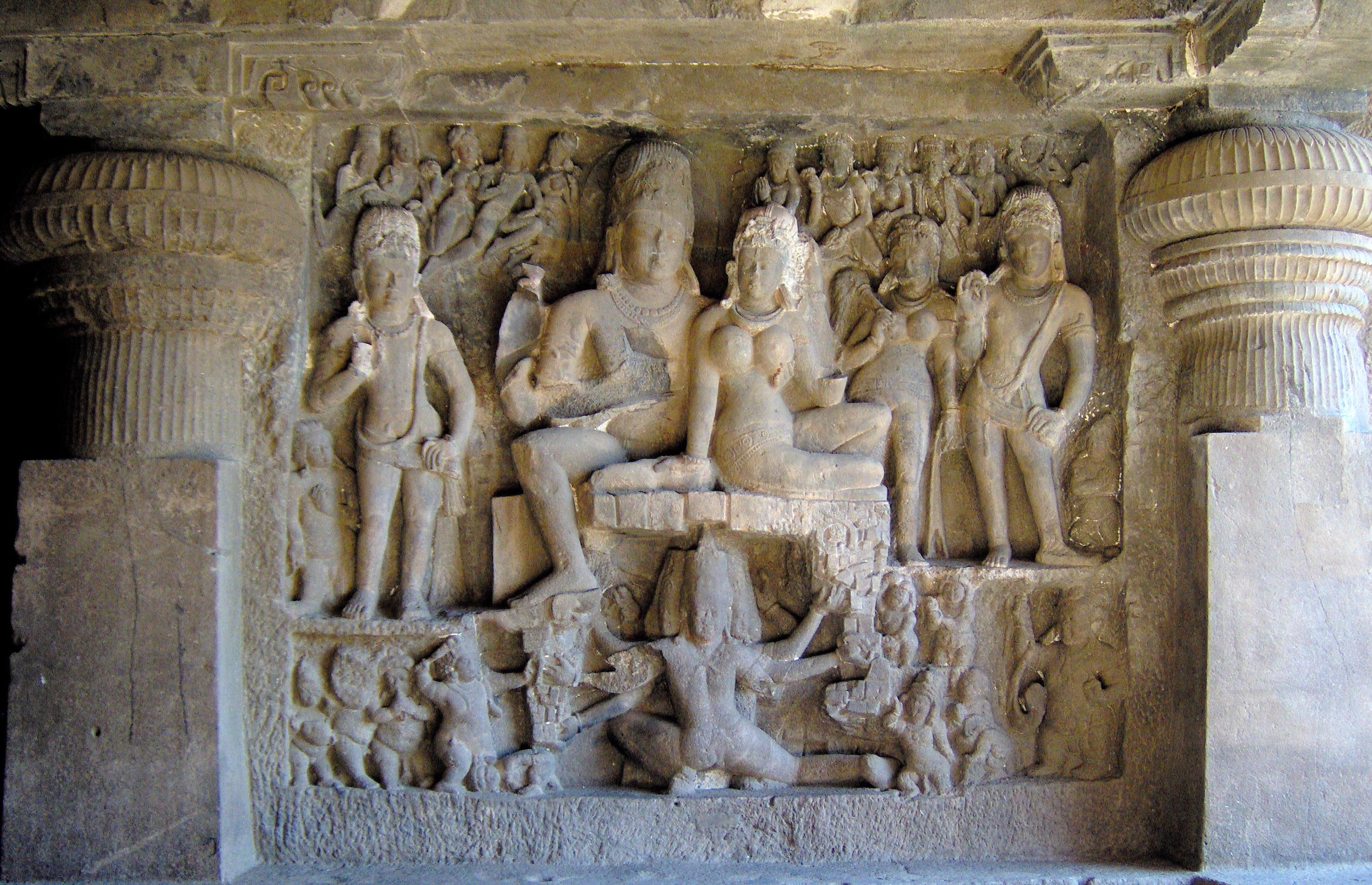
Bas-relief from Ellora (Cave 29) showing Shiva and Parvati

The Ellora Caves are located about 18 miles from the city of Aurangabad in the Chamadari Hills. Pre-historic paintings were engraved in five Ellora Caves. The Ellora paintings can be organized in two series. The first set of paintings depicts images of the goddess Lakshmi and Lord Vishnu and was developed while the caves were engraved. The second set of images focuses on images of Lord Shiva with his followers, Apsaras, etc. and was developed centuries after the formation of the caves.

=== Madhya Pradesh ===
==== Bagh ====
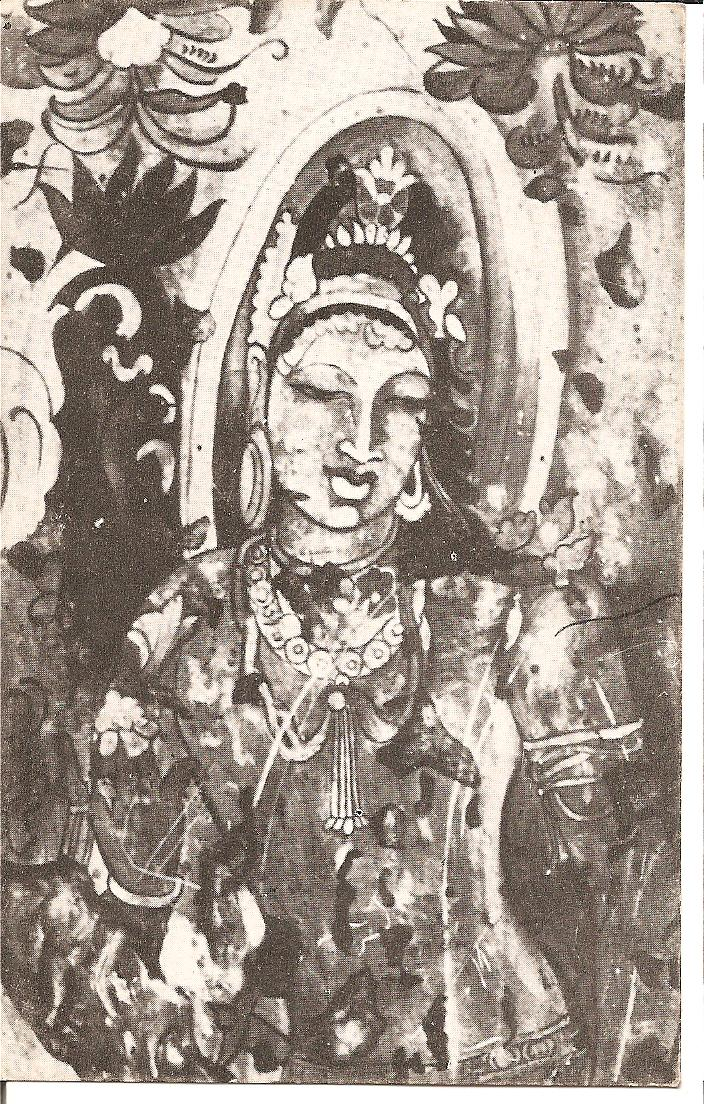
Painting of a Bodhisattva in Bagh Cave 2

The Bagh Caves are located in the Dhar District of Madhya Pradesh on the banks of the Baghani River. There were originally nine caves cut in the lofty hills, but four of them have been destroyed. The paintings in these caves were engraved in the time period of 500 to 700 CE.

=== Tamil Nadu ===
==== Sittanavasal paintings ====
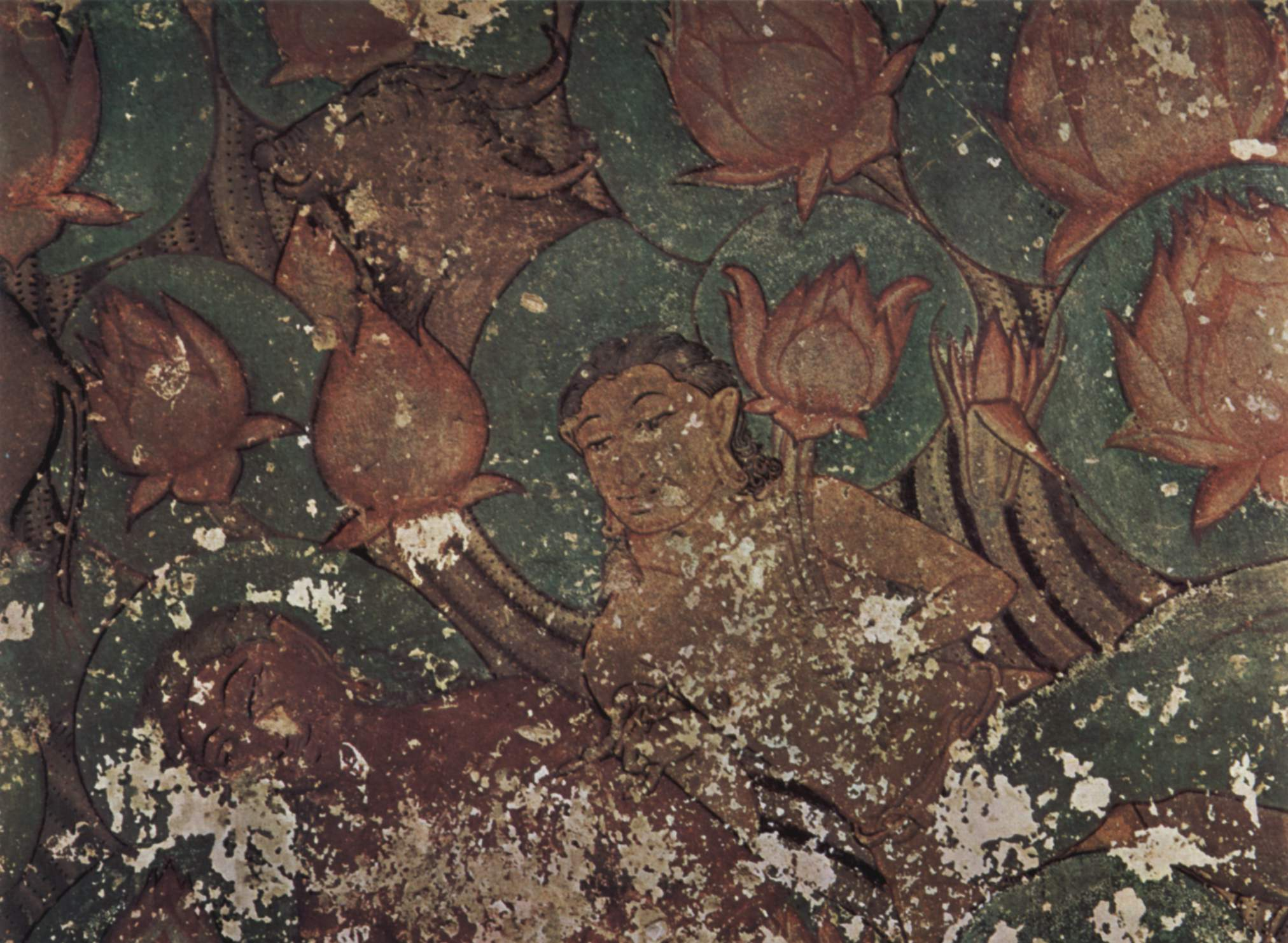
Painting on the roof of the Sittanvasal Cave

The decorative cave paintings are located in Sittanavasal village in Pudukottai district of Tamil Nadu. They are reported to provide a link between the Ajanta paintings (4th–6th century AD) and the Chola paintings of 11th century at Thanjavur. The ceilings have depiction of a lotus tank with natural looking images of men, animals, flowers, birds and fishes representing the Samavasarana faith of Jainism. The pillars are also carved with dancing girl and the king and the queen. Frescoes that have been preserved on the top parts of columns and ceilings inside the temple are mostly typical of the 9th century Pandyan period.

== See also ==
- Peopling of India
- South Asian Stone Age
- Kurumba painting

== Bibliography ==
- Total History and Civics. a history Textbook. Published by Morning Star Publishers. ICSE Std IX.

=== Further reading ===
- B. B. Lal (1968). Indian Rock Paintings: Their Chronology, Technique and Preservation.
- Jagat Pati Joshi; D. K. Sinha; Braj Basi Lal (1997). Facets of Indian Civilization: Prehistory and rock-art, protohistory: Essays in Honour of Prof. B.B. Lal (Vol. 1). Aryan Books International.

Media related to Cave paintings in India at Wikimedia Commons
