= R. Krishnan (artist) =

Indian tribal artist and Padma Shri awardee (died 2025)

- Born: c. 1973; Vellaricombai, Nilgiris district, Tamil Nadu, India
- Died: 25 March 2025 (aged 52); Mettupalayam, Coimbatore district, Tamil Nadu
- Known for: Kurumba painting
- Movement: Tribal art
- Spouse: Susheela
- Awards: Padma Shri (2026, posthumous)

R. Krishnan (c. 1973 – 25 March 2025), also known as Kitna, was an Indian artist from the Alu Kurumba tribal community in the Nilgiris district of Tamil Nadu. He is noted for his work in preserving Kurumba painting traditions by adapting motifs from rock art to canvas. In 2026, the Government of India posthumously awarded him the Padma Shri, the country's fourth-highest civilian award, for his contributions to Art.

== Biography ==
Krishnan was born in the tribal settlement of Vellaricombai near Kotagiri. He belonged to the Alu Kurumba tribe, an indigenous community traditionally associated with honey gathering and forest medicine. He began painting at the age of six, learning the technique from his grandfather, Mathan.

He worked as a daily wage laborer while continuing his artistic practice. In his later years, he resided in Mettupalayam. Krishnan died on 25 March 2025 following an illness. He was survived by his wife, Susheela, and four children.

== Art and style ==
Krishnan's work focused on the documentation of Kurumba culture and rituals. His style was derived from the rock art found at archaeological sites such as Vellaricombai and Eluthu Paarai.

He employed traditional methods, utilizing natural pigments sourced from the forest rather than synthetic paints. The palette typically included:

- Yellow and Brown: Extracted from the resin of the Vengai tree (Pterocarpus marsupium).
- Green: Obtained from plant leaves.
- Black: Derived from burnt wood or bark.

Common subjects in his paintings included tribal deities, honey harvesting, and local fauna such as the Great hornbill.
