= Kurumba painting =

Prehistoric tribal art form in India

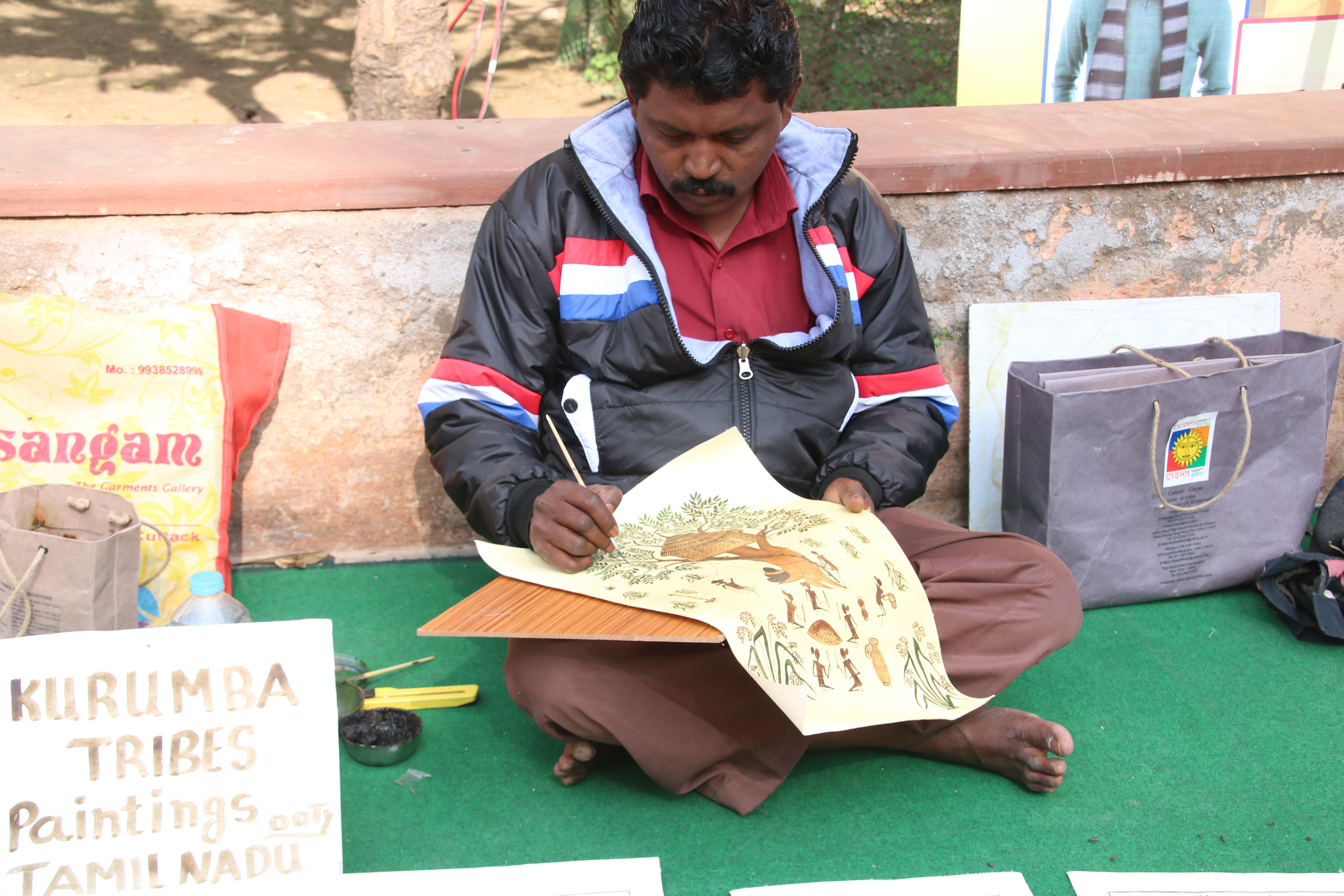
Kurumba painting (2017)

Kurumba painting, or Kurumbar painting, is a prehistoric art form utilizing painting that depict aspects of tribal Kurumba life in the Nilgiri Mountains, located in modern-day Tamil Nadu, India. The earliest documented reference to the continuity of Kurumba paintings on dwelling structures in the Nilgiris dates to 1871–1872, reported by James Wilkinson Breeks in 1873. These visual representations are historically linked to prehistoric and Neolithic rock art, estimated to be over 3,000 years old, discovered at the Jackanarai and Eluthu Paarai archaeological sites in the Nilgiri Hills of Tamil Nadu in 1984.

== History ==
The earliest documented evidence attesting to the continuity of Kurumba paintings on dwelling structures in the Nilgiris can be traced to the period of 1871–1872, as recorded by James Wilkinson Breeks in his 1873 account. His observations provide one of the first historical references to the sustained practice of this artistic tradition, indicating its established presence within Kurumba domestic and cultural life during the late nineteenth century.These paintings, depicting animals and human figures, were executed on whitewashed surfaces using charcoal and red earth.

An ancient rock art site was later discovered near Jackanarai village in the Nilgiris, featuring approximately 40 abstract red-ochre paintings. Archaeologists suggest that these artworks may have cultural connections to the local Kurumba community. Eluthu Paarai is another significant rock art site in the Nilgiris district, located in the Kothagiri region. Discovered in 1984 by American anthropologist Allen Zackerel, the site contains rock art estimated to be around 3,000 years old. Archaeologists identify these paintings as prehistoric, belonging primarily to the Neolithic period.

== Iconography and materials ==
A defining characteristic of Kurumba painting is the exclusive use of natural pigments sourced from the local environment. These naturally derived colors not only impart a distinctive aesthetic to the art form but also demonstrate indigenous knowledge of local plant resources and sustainable material practices. The continued use of such pigments reinforces the cultural authenticity and ecological significance of Kurumba painting traditions.

Kurumba paintings predominantly depict themes rooted in the community’s everyday life, cultural practices, and close interaction with the natural environment of the Nilgiris. The imagery commonly includes scenes of forests and wildlife, traditional dwellings constructed from leaves and wood, women engaged in drying food grains, and men involved in honey gathering. Social and ceremonial aspects of Kurumba life—such as weddings and ritual observances—are also frequently represented. In addition, elements of domestic livelihood, including earthen pens for rearing hens, and portrayals of wild animals moving through forested landscapes, together form a visual narrative that reflects the ecological, social, and cultural worldview of the Kurumba people.

== Revival of Kurumba art ==
Krishnan, from Velaricombai, a Kurumba settlement in the Nilgiris district, is widely credited with revitalizing Kurumba artistic traditions through his cloth paintings and a painting career spanning more than three decades. In 2026, the Government of India posthumously awarded the Padma Shri in the category of Art and Culture to Krishnan for his contributions to indigenous art. His work was inspired by ancient rock art and employed organic pigments derived from natural materials collected from forest environments.

== See also ==
- Cave paintings in India
