= Kilvalai =

- Location in Tamil Nadu, India
- 12.032458°N 79.340247°E
- Location: Villuppuram, India

Kilvalai or Kizhvalai, is a hamlet in Kandachipuram (Tamil: கண்டாச்சிபுரம்) taluk in Villuppuram (Tamil: விழுப்புரம்) district in the Indian state of Tamil Nadu. The major occupation of the people living at this place is agriculture. In 2011 it had a population of 700.

== Location ==
Kilvalai is located 24 kilometres (15 mi) northwest of Villupuram, 38 kilometres (24 mi) southeast of Thiruvannaamalai. Another important rock art site of Tamil Nadu, Settavarai is located 18 km northwest of Kilvalai.

== Transportation ==
Mofussil buses departing from Villupuram bus stand to Thiruvannaamalai go via Kilvalai. From the bus stop, the rock art site is 1 km distant.

== About the village ==
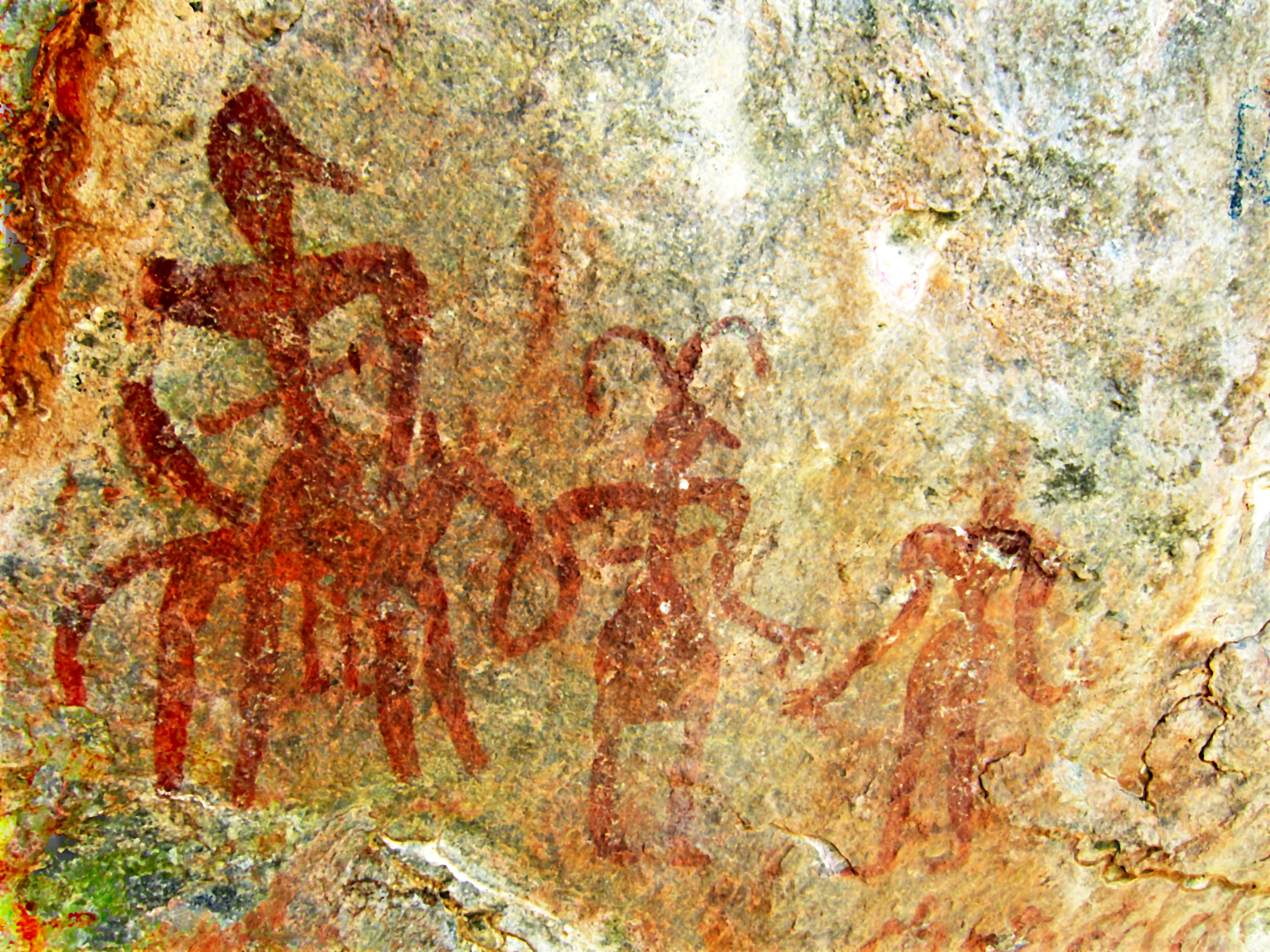
Human images

Kilvalai village has 3000-year-old heritage. The historical importance of the village is the presence of 1000 B.C.E. rock paintings. The kilvalai rock paintings consists mainly of human images with bird headed.

== Rock paintings ==
Globally, the study of rock art and their interpretations gained momentum in the field of archaeology. Archeologists not only denoted the artistic skill of the people who had painted them, also their beliefs and their daily activities. The paintings on the rock shelters are mostly depicting the hunting scenes and human activities.

== Kilvalai rock paintings ==
The rock paintings in kilvalai, are found in three rocky areas and are painted in red ochre. Among them, two are very weak and difficult to resolve. Also, very few paintings are seen here. The third one which contains majority of the paintings is clear. This rock art site is called as "Ratha Kudaikkal"(Tamil: இரத்த குடைக்கல்) by the local villagers, which means Blood Carvings.

== Human images ==
The first picture depicts three human beings postured side by side; one man seated on a horse, another holding its bridle and the third man standing with outstretched hands in a way of welcoming them. These men's faces resemble the beak of a bird. The second picture consists of four human beings standing on a boat. The third human image holding a long stick, probably sailing the boat.

== Graffiti ==
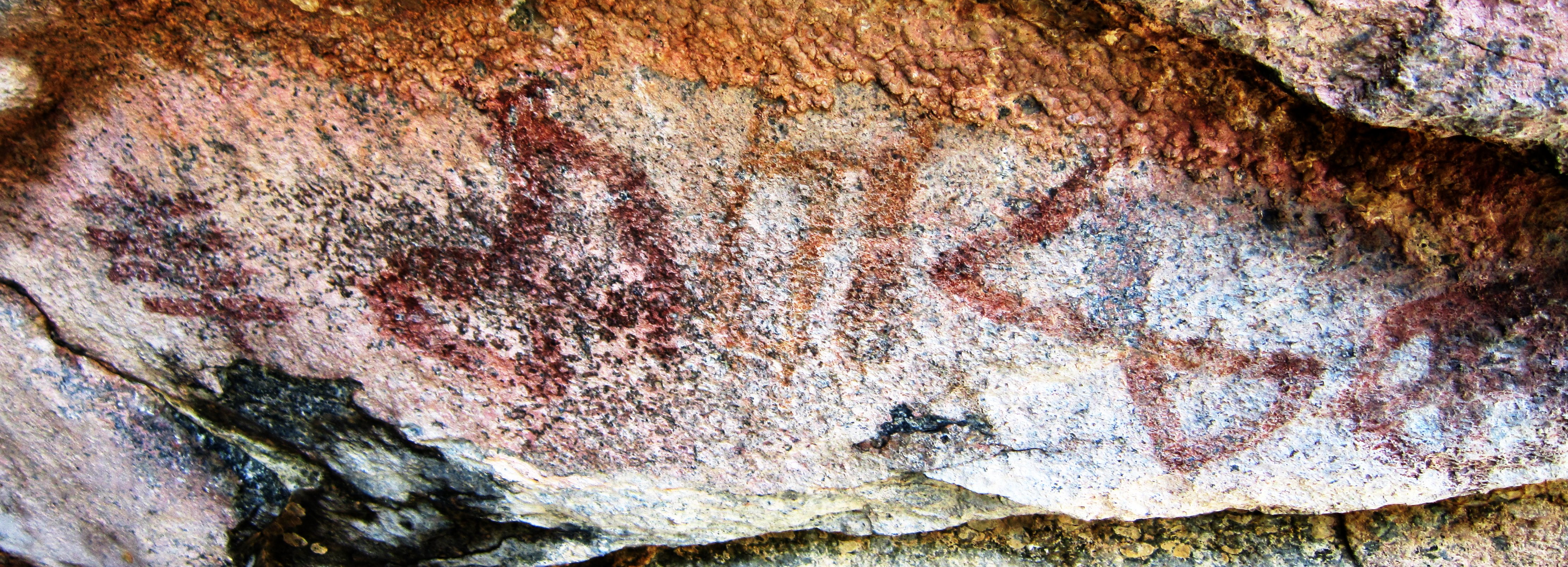
Graffiti

Paintings of some graffiti consisting of combined triangles, addition, multiplication markings, drawn inside the circles, stacked lines are seen. These images are similar to the graffiti found in Indus Valley civilization. A Sun image with 17 rays is also seen here. The first symbol indicates, rainfall with thunder; second one, going as a group along with the head of the group; third one, going towards the north direction; fourth one, the production of musical sound; and the fifth one, festival time.

== See also ==
- Rock art
- Cave painting
- Bhimbetka rock shelters
- Settavarai
- Nehanurpatti
