= Settavarai =

Sethavarai
- Location in Tamil Nadu, India
- 12.15606°N 79.249106°E
- Location: Villuppuram, India

Sethavarai is a small village in Gingee taluk in Villuppuram district in the Indiain state of Tamil Nadu. The major occupation of the inhabitants is agriculture. In 2017 it had a population of 1100(apex).

== Location ==
Sethavarai is located in Villupuram District, Tamil Nadu. The sethavarai in six hills one is missing for the Elumalaiyan temple located 50 kilometres (31 mi) northwest of Villupuram, 28 kilometres (17 mi) southeast of Thiruvannaamalai, 26 kilometres (16 mi) southeast of Gingee . Another important rock art site of Tamil Nadu, Kilvalai, is located 18 km southeast of Sethavarai.

== Transportation (via Sethavarai) ==
T13-Gingee ~ Thadagam, T15-Thirukovilur ~ Nallan Pillai Petral, 122N-Thirukovilur ~ Chennai, 122F-Gingee to vettavalam to Chennai, 122Gt-Gingee to Thirukovilur to Chennai, DEEN MOTORS-Devikapuran ~ Vettavalam.

== About the village ==
Sethavarai village has a 3000-year heritage. The historical importance of the village is the presence of 1000 B.C.E. rock paintings. The Sethavarai rock paintings consist mainly of animal images.

== Rock paintings ==
Globally, the study of rock art and their interpretations has gained momentum in the field of archaeology. Archeologists not only denoted the artistic skill of the people who had painted them, also their beliefs and their daily activities. The paintings on the rock shelters mostly depict hunting scenes and human activities.

== Sethavarai Rock paintings ==
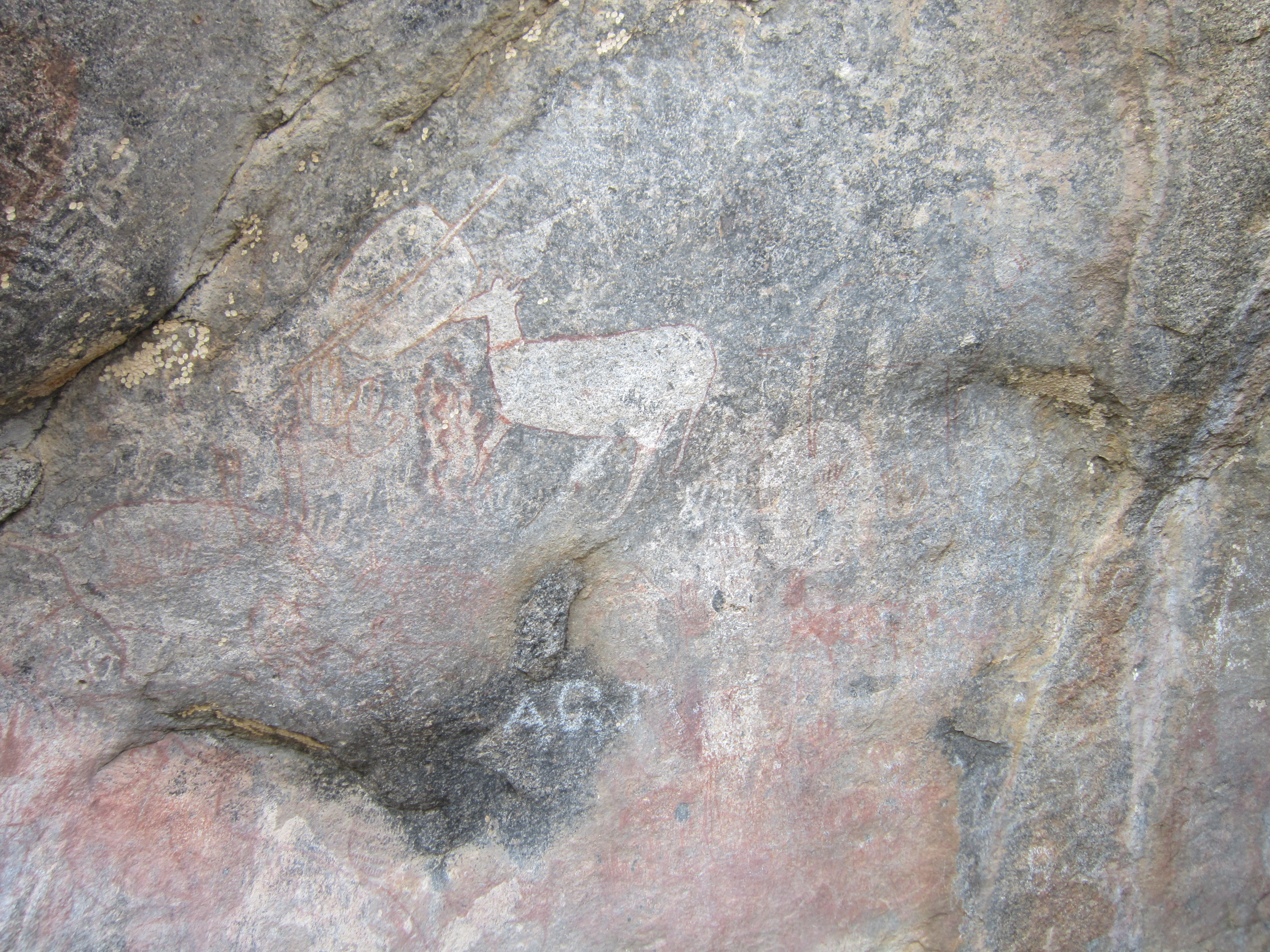
deer image

The paintings are found in the rock shelters of a hillock called Ayyanarmalai. Animals like deer, wild boar, buffalo, tiger, fish and many images of human palms with fingers are found at the top of the hill. Among these paintings, a deer and a fish are depicted in large size. The outlines for these two figures are drawn in red ochre while the inner portion is painted white. The figure of a buffalo is drawn completely in red. The form of another buffalo is drawn in thick ochre while the back half is painted showing the bones and other inner organs. These types of paintings are called x-ray paintings.

One significant scene is found in front of the deer. A small amount of flesh is found fried in the fire with the help of long pole. This scene confirms that the authors of these paintings were well aware of eating fried flesh and fish.

Only one human figure is found in this large scene of animals. The nose of the human is drawn in the same style as seen in Kilvalai rock paintings, but without a dagger. Based on the execution of paintings and the style of the figures, the date of these paintings is estimated at 1500 B.C.E.

== Picture gallery ==
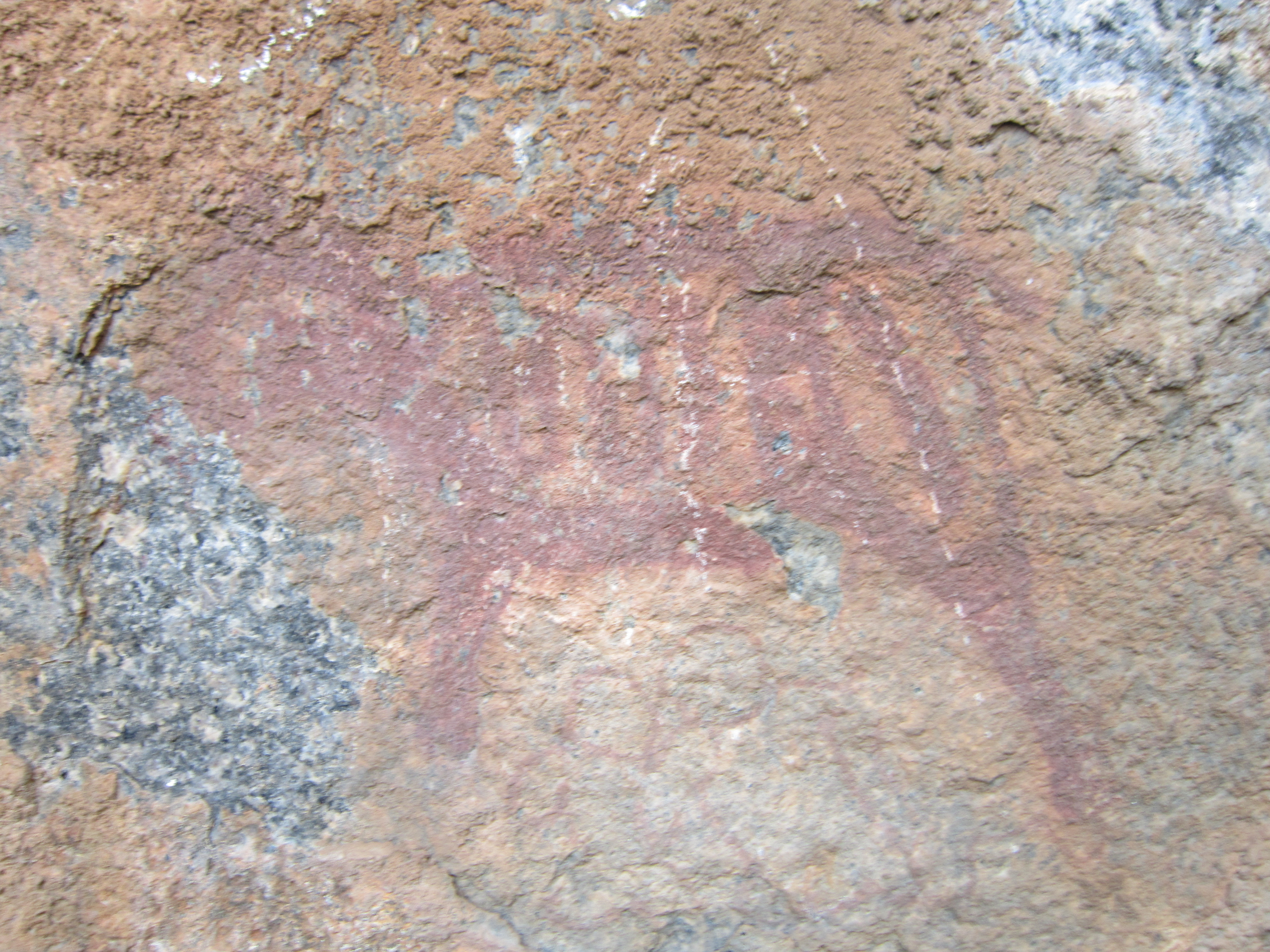
An X-ray painting of a cow

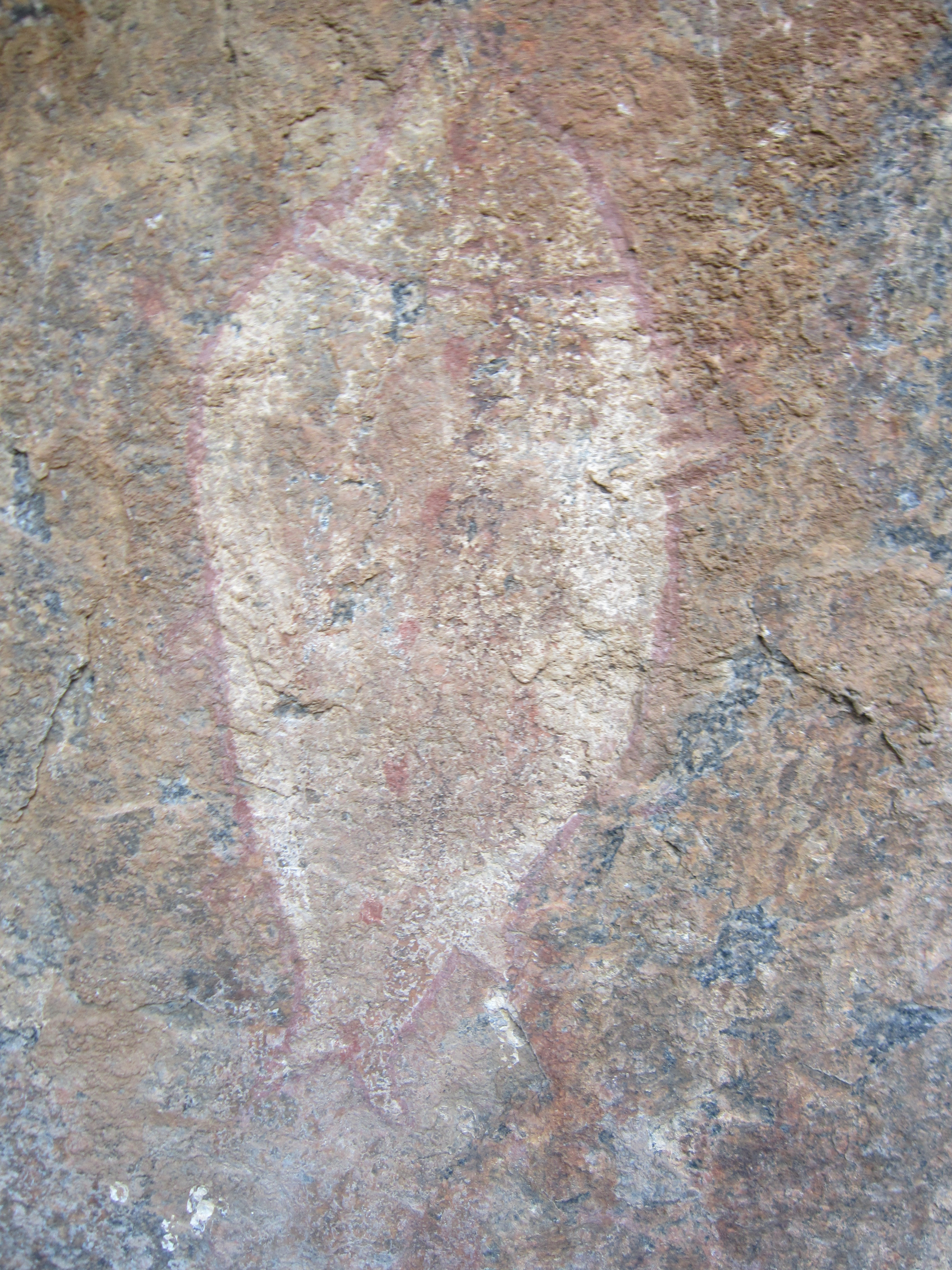
Fish Painting 1

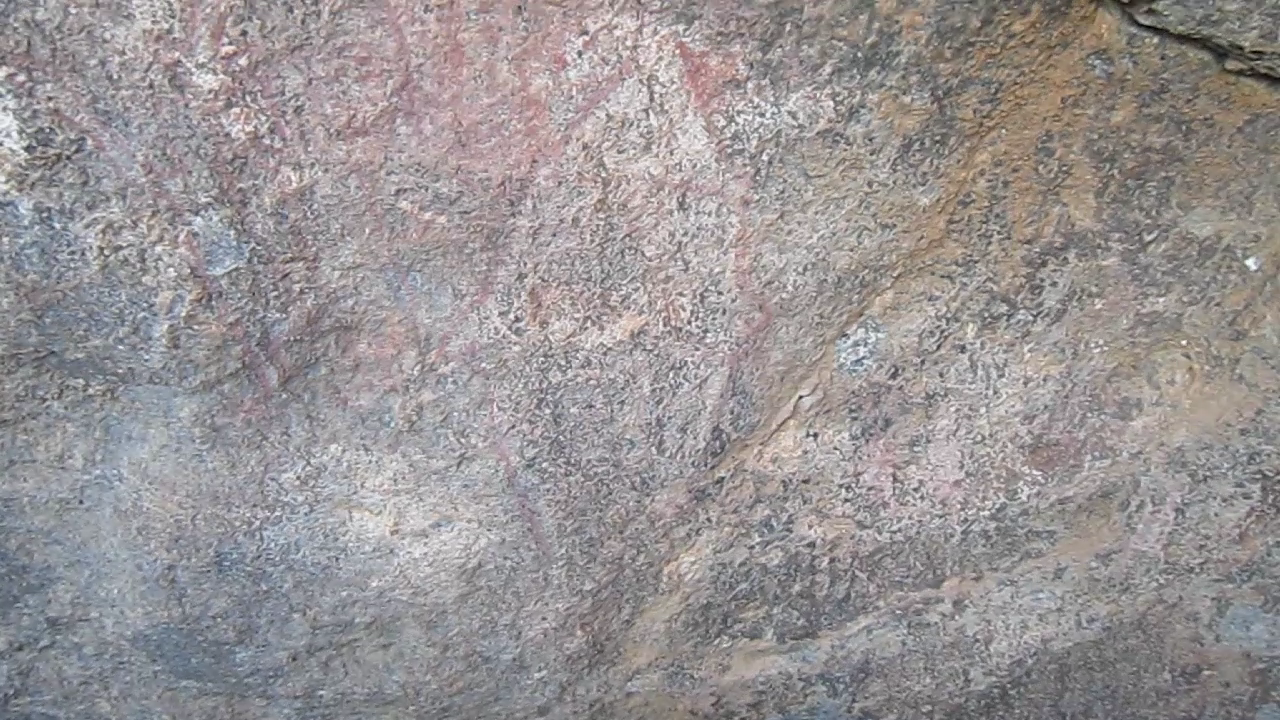
Fish painting 2

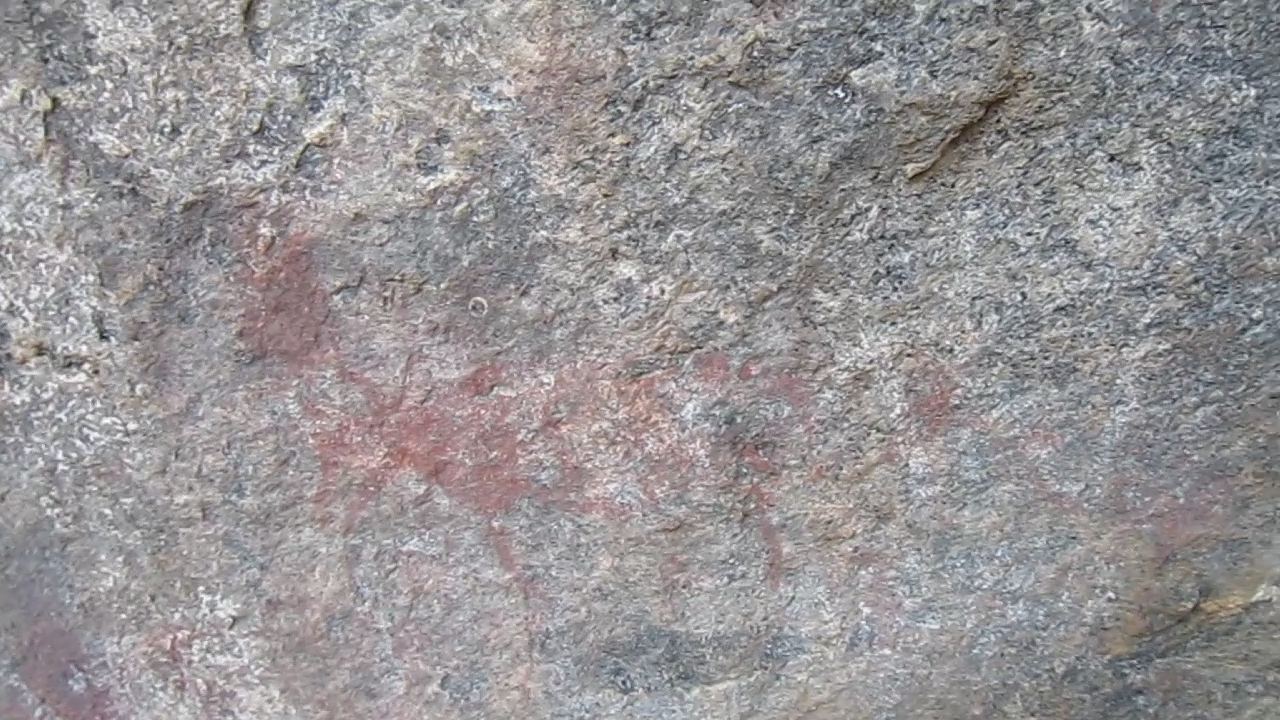
Buffalo with horns

== See also ==
- Jainism in Tamil Nadu
