= James Wilkinson Breeks =

British author (1830–1872)

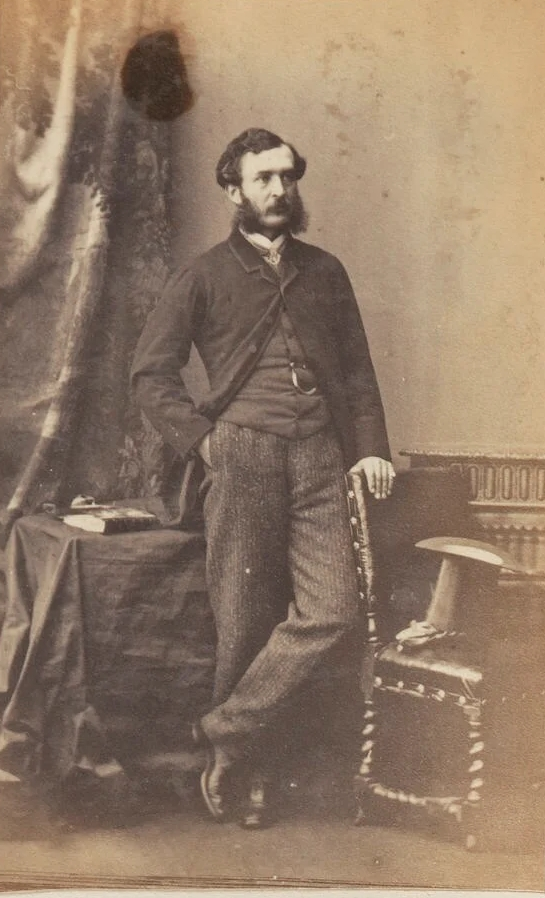
Breeks in 1860

James Wilkinson Breeks (5 March 1830 – 7 June 1872) was a British Indian colonial administrator who served as the first commissioner of the Nilgiris. He wrote some of the early anthropological treatises on the peoples of the region. He is best known for the book An Account of the Primitive Tribes and Monuments in the Nilagiris published posthumously in 1873.

== Life and work ==
Breeks was born at Warcop, Westmorland, on 5 March 1830, and entered the Madras civil service in 1849. After filling various offices in the revenue and financial departments he was appointed private secretary to Sir William Denison, governor of Madras, in 1861, holding that appointment until the latter part of 1864, when, owing to ill-health, he left India and joined a mercantile firm in London, with the intention of retiring from the public service; but this arrangement not proving satisfactory, he returned to Madras in the autumn of 1867 and was appointed Commissioner of the Nilgiris, the principal sanatorium of the south of India.

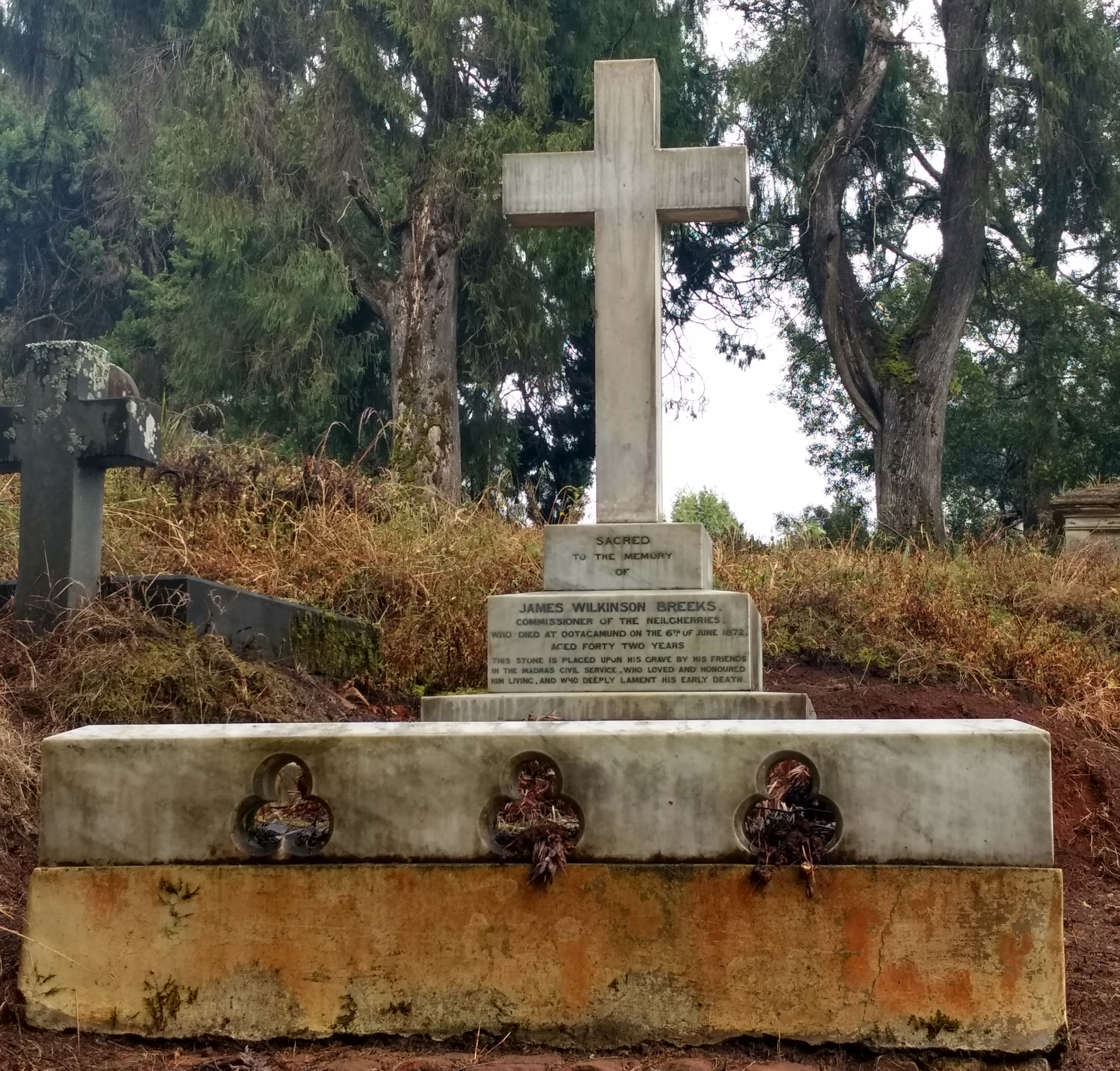
Grave of James Wilkinson Breeks at Ootacamund

While posted in the Nilgiris, and like other heads of districts in the Madras presidency, he was, in 1871, called upon by the government, at the instance of the trustees of the Indian Museum at Calcutta, to make a collection of arms, ornaments, dresses, household utensils, tools, agricultural implements to illustrate the habits and modes of life of the aboriginal tribes in the district, as well as a collection of objects found in ancient cairns and monuments. He made collection of the artefacts in use among the four major tribes of the Niligiris, the Todas, Kotas, Kurumbas, and Irulas, and of the contents of many megalithic burials. A significant part of Breeks' collection of prehistoric artefacts from the Nilgiri mountains is now in the British Museum. Breeks became ill on his travels and died in 1872. His work An Account of the Primitive Tribes and Monuments in the Nilagiris was published after his death in 1873 and it included accounts of five tribes illustrated by drawings and photographs, and supplemented by a brief notice of some similar remains in other parts of India. It was edited by his widow.

Breeks married Susan Maria, the daughter of the governor William Denison in 1863. They had three sons and one daughter. He fell ill and died on 7 June 1872.

The Breeks Memorial School at Ootacamund, for the children of poor Europeans and Eurasians, was erected by public subscription shortly after his death as a memorial of his services to the Nilagiri community.
