= Lodi–Tomaras War =

War between Delhi Sultanate and the Tomaras of Gwalior

Lodi–Tomaras War (1501–1507)
Date	1501–1507 AD
Location	Rajasthan 26.7°N 77.9°E
Result	Lodi victory
Territorial changes	Dholpur, Mandrayal and Utngarh added to the territory of Delhi Sultanate

Belligerents
Delhi Sultanate	Tanwars of Dholpur; Tomaras of Gwalior

Commanders and leaders
Sikandar Lodi; Alam Khan; Khan-i-Khanan Nuhani; Khawas Khan; Khwaja Baben †; Adam Lodi; Mian Makan; Mujahid Khan; Azam Humayun; Awadh Khan; Ahmad Khan; Imad Khan Farmuli; Malik Alauddin (WIA)	Man Singh Tomar; Vinayak Deva; Raja Manik Dev

Strength
10,000 Cavalry; 100 Elephants	Unknown

Casualties and losses
Heavy	Heavy
- Location within Rajasthan Lodi–Tomaras War (India)

The Lodi–Tomaras War (1501–1507) was a series of military campaigns fought between Sultan Sikandar Lodi of the Delhi Sultanate and Man Singh Tomar of the Tomaras of Gwalior. Sikandar captured Dholpur from Vinayak Deva in 1501. In 1504 he took Mandrail, later in 1505–1506 he ravaged the Gwalior countryside from the Chambal River but failed to capture the main fort, and in 1507 he seized the strategic fort of Utgir (Avantgarh) after a fierce siege. Despite repeated expeditions, plundering, and the conquest of several peripheral forts, Sikandar could not reduce the strongly defended Gwalior Fort itself. Raja Man Singh successfully defended his core territory through guerrilla tactics and ambushes. The war ended in 1507, with Gwalior remaining independent under Tomara rule.

== Background ==
In 1500, Sa'id Khan Sarwani, governor of Lahore and Asghar of Delhi plotted to place Sikandar's brother Fateh Khan on the throne, but the prince exposed them; Asghar was jailed, while Sarwani and his associates were banished. They sought refuge to Gwalior, where RajaMan Singh Tomar sheltered them. Sikandar chose to attack Gwalior both to punish Raja Man Singh for sheltering his banished nobles. Meanwhile rebel attacks on Bayana, believed to be stirred by the Raja of Dholpur gave Sikandar an excuse to attack Dholpur. Dholpur was a Gwalior dependency under Raja Vinayakdeva.

== Campaigns ==
=== Siege of Dholpur (1501) ===
In 1501, Sikandar Lodi ordered his generals Alam Khan, Khan-i-Khanan Lohani and Khawas Khan to invade Dholpur, then ruled by Raja Manik Dev. The Raja offered battle upon the arrival of the Lodi forces and the subsequent siege of the fort. Daily skirmishes resulted in heavy casualties on the Lodi side, including the death of the noted warrior Khwaja Baban. Upon receiving news of the setbacks, Sikandar Lodi marched rapidly from Sambhal and reached Dholpur on 25 March 1501. As the Sultan approached, Rai Manik Dev fled to Gwalior, leaving his family and dependents in the fort. That night, the defenders abandoned the stronghold, allowing the Lodi forces to occupy Dholpur without further resistance the following morning. The victorious troops looted the town. Sikandar Lodi remained in Dholpur for a month. He then left Adam Khan Lodi and a contingent of nobles in charge of the fort and advanced toward Gwalior. The Sultan sought to punish its ruler, Raja Man Singh, for two offences: sheltering nobles who had rebelled against the Lodi regime, and providing refuge to the fugitive Raja of Dholpur.

=== Campaign of Gwalior (1502–3) ===
Next, Sikandar Lodi crossed the Chambal River and encamped on the banks of the Asi (Mandakini River) for two months. An epidemic broke out among the troops due to low water levels. In 1503, Man Singh sent his wakil to sue for peace. He surrendered the fugitive nobles S'aid Khan, Babu Khan, and Rai Ganesh, and sent his eldest son Vikramjit as hostage. Sikandar honoured Vikramjit with a khilat and a horse. After the terms were settled, the Sultan marched back to Agra. He reinstated Manik Deo as ruler of Dholpur before returning to the fort.

=== Siege of Mandrail (1504) ===
In 1504, Sultan Sikandar Lodi marched against the fort of Mandrail, located to the east of Gwalior and forming part of the territories associated with the Tomar rulers of Gwalior. The garrison requested quarter and surrendered the fort without prolonged fighting. Sikandar left Mian Makhan (or Makan) and Mujahid Khan in charge of the fort with a garrison. The surrounding countryside was plundered: buildings and gardens were destroyed, people were killed or taken prisoner, and the land was laid waste. After these operations, Sikandar returned toward his base. Many of his troops suffered from illness, fever, and heat-related casualties during the return, particularly in areas such as the Bayana region. Following this campaign, concerns over loyalty led to the replacement of Dholpur's governor, Vinayak Deva, with Malik Qamar-ud-din, and the fort at Dholpur was strengthened as a forward base.

=== Campaign of Gwalior (1505–1506) ===
In late 1505, after the rainy season, Sikandar Lodi renewed operations against Gwalior territories. He halted at Dholpur for about one to one-and-a-half months to rest and refit his army, then advanced to the banks of the Chambal River, where he encamped for several months. Princes such as Jalal Khan and Ibrahim Khan, along with other chiefs, were posted at Dholpur. From the Chambal camp, Sikandar led forces into the Gwalior countryside, conducting raids. Troops were hunted down, many killed or enslaved, and the land ruined. Rajput tactics blocked supplies, leaving the Lodi camp short of food. Sikandar deputed detachments, including one under Azam Humayun, to procure supplies, but these faced harassment. A significant engagement occurred at Chatawar, (Note: also referred to as Chinawar or near Jatwar) a dependency of Gwalior. The Lodi advance guard was attacked in an ambush by Rajput forces. A fierce battle followed, in which commanders such as Awadh Khan, Ahmad Khan, and reinforcements from the main army repelled the attackers. Many Rajputs were killed or captured. Despite the tactical success and widespread ravaging of the territory, Sikandar did not advance to besiege the main Gwalior Fort itself. As the rainy season approached again and supplies remained short, he withdrew toward Agra via Dholpur, leaving several nobles including Awadh Khan at Dholpur. During the retreat, Raja Man Singh Tomar's forces ambushed the Lodi army near Jatwar, inflicting casualties before being driven off. Some accounts note that Sikandar himself narrowly escaped an encounter with Rajput scouts. The campaign, lasting roughly from September 1505 to May 1506, ended without the capture of Gwalior Fort. Sikandar had secured control over outlying areas including Mandrail and strengthened his position at Dholpur, but the core objective of reducing the Gwalior state remained unachieved.

=== Siege of Untgarh (1507) ===
In 1506–07, after the rise of Canopus and following his earlier campaigns around Gwalior, Sultan Sikandar Lodi turned his attention to the fort of Utgir (Note: Also known as Uditnagar, Avantgarh, Untgarh, Awantgarh, or Antagarh.). The fort, situated south of Mandrail on the Chambal River and lying along the Narwar–Gwalior route (approximately 28 miles south-west of Karauli at the southern mouth of the Pannar Pass), was regarded as a strategic key for further operations against Gwalior. Sikandar first sent an advance force under Imad Khan Farmuli and Mujahid Khan with a strong contingent including 10,000 cavalry and 100 elephants for reconnaissance. He himself halted at Dholpur, later joined the advance party there, and left Mujahid Khan at Dholpur before crossing the Chambal. The Sultan reached the fort on 6 February 1507. He ordered a siege and personally directed the assault. The Lodi forces surrounded the fort from all sides and pressed the attack intensely. A breach was effected in the walls, primarily through the efforts of Malik Alauddin, who was blinded in one eye by an arrow during the fighting. Once the outer defences were overrun, the Rajput garrison retreated into their houses, continuing desperate resistance. The women and children performed jauhar, while the men fought to the death. After the fort was taken Sikandar initially placed the fort under the charge of Mian Makhan and Mujahid Khan. However, it was soon discovered that Mujahid Khan had allegedly accepted a bribe from the Raja of Utgir and had agreed to influence the Sultan to relinquish the fort. In response, on 28 May 1507, the Sultan arrested Mulla Jumman, a chamberlain and partisan of Mujahid Khan, and sent orders to the nobles at Dholpur to arrest Mujahid Khan. The fort was then transferred to Malik Tajuddin Kamboh.

== Aftermath ==
Following the capture, Sikandar began his return march to Agra via Dholpur in June 1507. He passed through Dholpur. The chosen route proved extremely difficult due to its narrow, uneven, and rugged terrain with scarcity of water. Many soldiers died of thirst, while others who found water drank excessively and collapsed. Some were crushed by the press of baggage animals. Official counts after reaching safer ground recorded approximately 800 casualties from these causes. The Sultan reached Agra shortly afterward and spent the rainy season there.

== See also ==
- Battle of Dholpur
- Siege of Gwalior (1518)

== Bibliography ==
- Pandey, Awadh Bihari (1956). The First Afghan Empire in India, 1451-1526 A. D. Bookland. Archived from the original on 2018-09-25.
- Halim, Abdul (1961). History of the Lodi Sultans of Delhi and Agra. University of Dacca. Archived from the original on 2017-01-16.
- Habib, Mohammad; Nizami, Khaliq Ahmad (1970). A Comprehensive History of India. Vol. 5, Part 2. People's Publishing House.
- Haig, W. (1928). The Cambridge History of India: Turks and Afghans, edited by W. Haig. Vol. III. Cambridge University Press.
- Roy, Nirodbhusan (1958). Niamatullah's History of the Afghans: Part 1 - Lodi Period. Santiniketan Press.
- Halim, Abdul (1939). "Sikandar Lodi as a Founder". Proceedings of the Indian History Congress. 3: 842–848. ISSN 2249-1937.
- Lal, Kishori Saran (1963). Twilight of the Sultanate. Asia Publishing House. OCLC 500687579.
- Srivastava, Ashirbadi Lal (1966). The Sultanate of Delhi, 711-1526 A.D.: Including the Arab Invasion of Sindh, Hindu Rule in Afghanistan and Causes of the Defeat of the Hindus in Early Medieval Age. Shiva Lal Agarwala. Archived from the original on 2020-10-13.
