= Dolji Ka Khera =

Dolji Ka Khera Dolat Singhji Ka Khera
- village
- Location in Rajasthan, India Dolji Ka Khera (India)
- Coordinates: 24.56°N 74.38°E
- Country: India
- State: Rajasthan
- District: Chittorgarh
- Block: Kapasan
- Gram Panchayat: Chhapari
- Founder: Dolat Singh Tanwar

Government
  - Body: Panchayat
- Elevation: 460 m (1,510 ft)

Population (2011)
  - Total: 271

Languages
  - Official: Rajasthani
- Time zone: UTC+5:30 (IST)
- PIN: 312202
- ISO 3166 code: RJ-IN
- Vehicle registration: RJ-09

Dolji Ka Khera is a village in Chittorgarh district of Rajasthan State in India.It comes under Chhapari Gram Panchayat in Kapasan block. Kapasan is nearest town to the Dolji Ka Khera village. Dolji Ka Khera village is founded by Dolat Singh Tanwar in around 17th century and his ancestor's was descended from Patan, Rajasthan of Torawati in 16th century.
