= Tomar (Rajput clan) =

North Indian clan

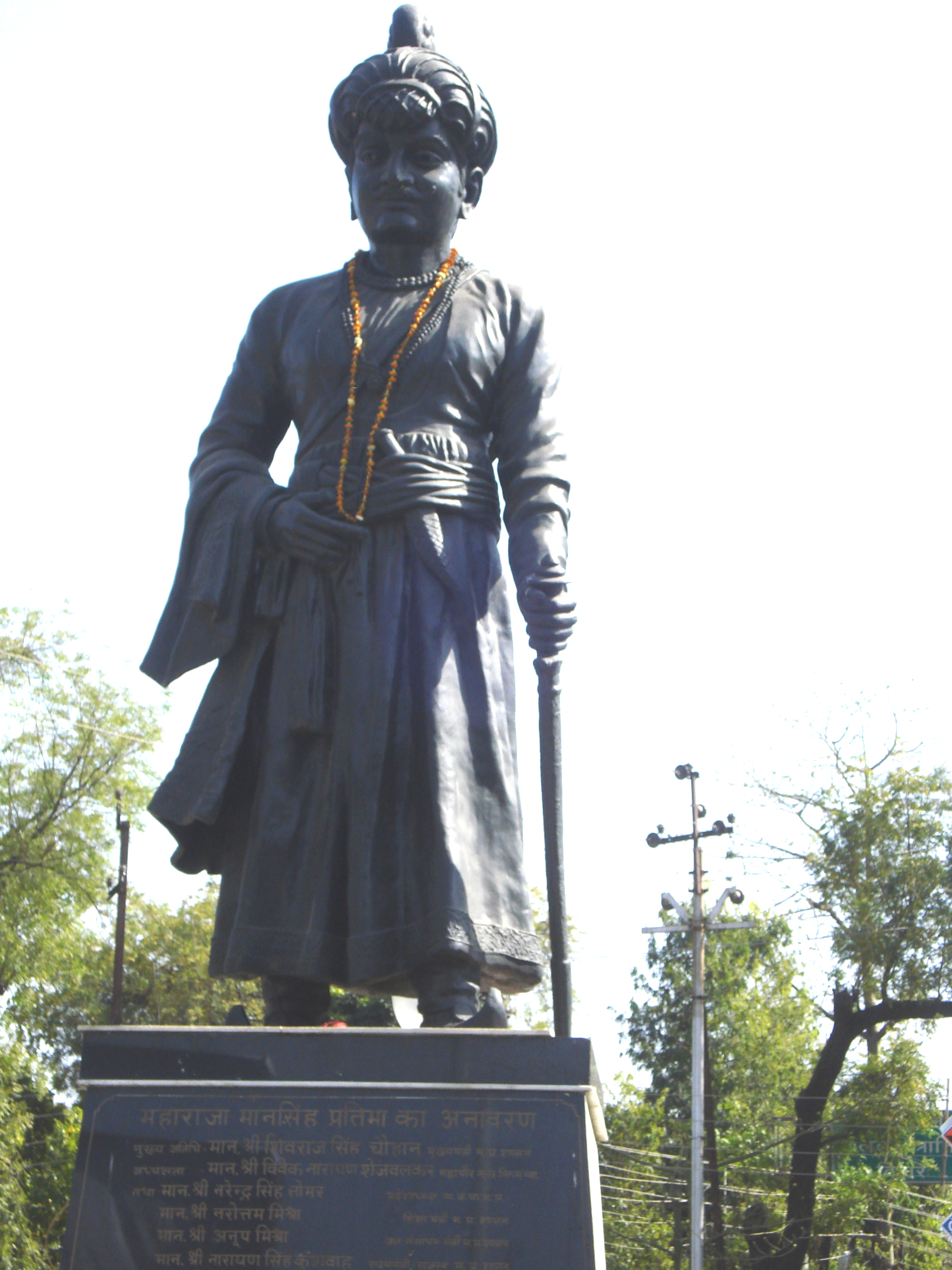
Man Singh Tomar, Gwalior

Tomar or Tanwar (also called Tomara) is a clan name, some members of which ruled parts of North India at different times. They are Rajputs and claim Chandravanshi descent.

Most of their population is primarily concentrated in Delhi, Haryana-Torawati and Western UP. There exist 84 villages of Tomars in Western UP alone. Besides, some areas in Northern Madhya Pradesh like Morena, Bhind and Gwalior are referred to as "Tomargarh" meaning "Fort of Tomars" due to quite large population of Tomar Rajputs outside Delhi and its surrounding areas.

Some notable Tomar Rajput rulers are:

- Anangpal Tomar, ruler of the Tomara dynasty of Delhi
- Ramshah Tanwar, a Tomar ruler who fought as an ally of Maharana Pratap along with his three sons, grandson and 300 soldiers against Mughal ruler Akbar in the Battle of Haldighati
- Man Singh Tomar, ruler of Gwalior, who defended his kingdom for nearly two decades against relentless attacks from the Lodi dynasty

== History ==
The Tomar clan claim descent from Chandravanshi dynasty, naming the Mahabharata warrior Arjuna among their forebears.

The earliest extant historical reference to the Tomaras (the Sanskrit form of "Tomar") occurs in the Pehowa inscription of the Gurjara-Pratihara king Mahendrapala I (r. c. 885-910 CE). This undated inscription suggests that the Tomara chief Gogga was a vassal of Mahendrapala I.

=== Tomaras of Delhi ===
During 9th-12th century, the Tomaras of Delhi ruled parts of the present-day Delhi, Haryana, Western Uttar Pradesh, Gwalior and parts of Rajasthan. Much of the information about this dynasty comes from bardic legends of little historical value, and therefore, the reconstruction of their history is difficult. According to the bardic tradition, the dynasty's founder Anangapal Tomar (that is Anangapala I Tomara) founded Delhi in 736 CE. The bardic legends also state that the last Tomara King (also named Anangapal) passed on the throne of Delhi to his son-in-law Prithviraj Chauhan. This claim is subject to interpretation: historical evidence shows that Prithviraj inherited Delhi from his father Someshvara. According to the Bijolia inscription of Someshvara, his brother Vigraharaja IV had captured Dhillika (Delhi) and Ashika (Hansi); he probably defeated a Tomara ruler.

=== Tomaras of Gwalior ===
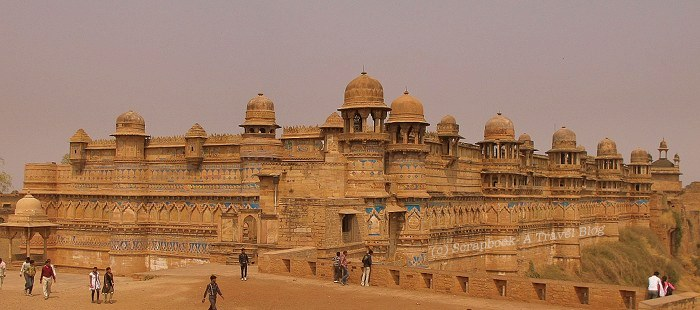
The "Man Mandir" palace built by Tomaras of Gwalior ruler Man Singh Tomar (reigned 1486–1516 CE), at Gwalior Fort.

The Tomaras of Gwalior ruled an area north of Gwalior known as the Tonwargarh tract. The most notable of these rulers was Man Singh Tomar (1486-1517).

== See also ==
- Tomaras of Dehli
- Tomaras of Gwalior
- Tomaras of Nurpur
- Tomaras of Beja
