= Arjun Lal Jingar =

Indian politician

Member of the Rajasthan Legislative Assembly
- Incumbent
- Assumed office 2013
- Constituency: Kapasan

Personal details
- Born: 1 December 1961 (age 63) Rashmi, Chittorgarh
- Political party: Bhartiya Janata Party

Arjun Lal Jingar is an Indian politician. He is a member of the Rajasthan Legislative Assembly from Kapasan. He is a member of the Bharatiya Janata Party.

== Political career ==
Arjun Lal contested as a representative of Bharatiya Janata Party from the Gangrar constituency of Rajasthan State in 1993, in which he won from Amar Chand with 31273 votes. In 1998, he had contested as a Bhartiya Janta Party candidate from the Gangrar constituency but lost with 46427 votes from Kaloo Ram Khateek. In 2003, he contested the Bhartiya Janata Party candidate from the Gangrar constituency and won with 56816 votes and beat Kalu Lal Khatik. In 2013, he contested Rajasthan State as Bharatiya Janata Party candidate from Kapasan constituency assembly constituency, in which he defeated R.D. Jawa with 96190 votes. In 2018, he contested Rajasthan State as the Bhartiya Janta Party candidate from the Kapasan constituency, in which he won by defeating Anandi Ram with 81470 votes.

== Controversy ==
In September 2025, Suraj Mali, a resident of Kapasan, Chittorgarh, was reportedly assaulted by masked attackers after posting videos on social media addressing Jeengar and referring to his election promise to bring water from the Matrikundia dam to Kapasan pond. The incident led RLP chief Hanuman Beniwal to organize a 13-day protest in Kapasan, seeking administrative action. The protest concluded after the authorities assured an investigation by the Special Operations Group (SOG), compensation to the victim, a contract job, allocation of a shop in the vegetable market, and coverage of medical expenses.
