= Gwalior Fort =

Fort in Madhya Pradesh, India

Fort of Gwalior
- India
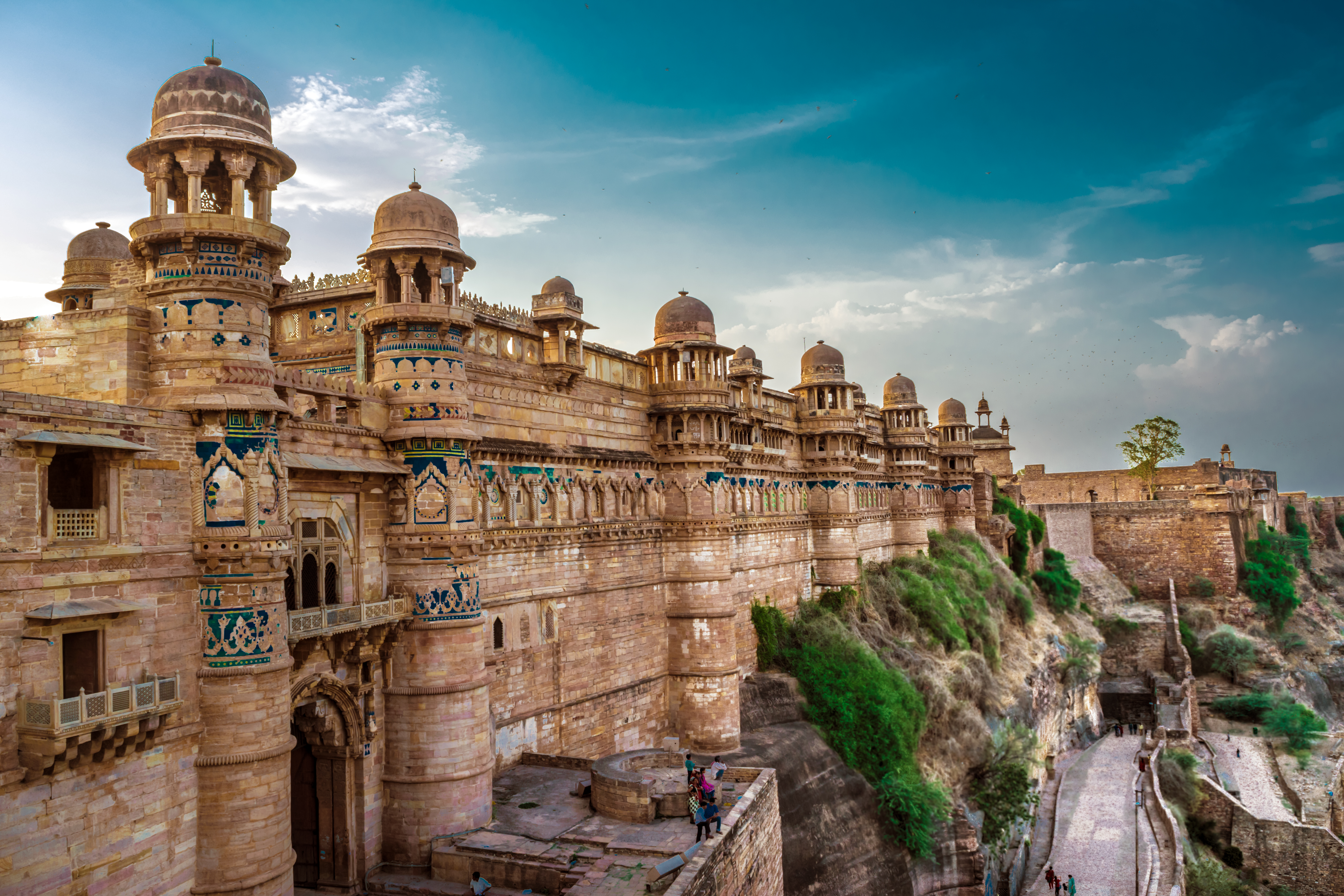
- The "Man Mandir" at Gwalior Fort.

Site information
- Type: Fort
- Owner: Hunas (5th century); Pratihara dynasty (8th–10th centuries); Kachchhapaghata dynasty (10th–12th centuries); Delhi Sultanate (12th–13th centuries); Tomar Dynasty (14th–16th centuries); Captured by Babur (1526); Sur Empire (1540–1542); Mughal Empire (1542–1725); Jats of Gohad (1725–1735); East India Company (1735–1740); House of Scindia of the Maratha Confederacy (1755–1948); British Empire (1858–86); Government of India (1948–present)
- Open to the public: Yes

Location
- Location within India Location within Madhya Pradesh
- Coordinates: 26.2303°N 78.1689°E

Site history
- Built: 6th century. The present-day fort consists of a defensive structure, six palaces and several temples. Renovated by the Scindias in 1916.
- In use: Yes
- Materials: Sandstone and lime mortar
- Battles/wars: Numerous
- Events: Numerous

Gwalior Fort, or the Fort of Gwalior, is a sixth-century hill fort in Gwalior, India. The Mughal emperor Babur described it as the "pearl amongst the fortresses of Hind, and not even the winds could touch its masts" due to its grandeur. The fort dates back to the fifth century (perhaps earlier), making it one of the India's oldest defensive forts. Ancient Sanskrit inscriptions record the fort's name as "Gopgiri". The current structure has stood since at least the eighth century, and the inscriptions and monuments in the fort complex indicate that it may have existed as early as the beginning of the sixth century.

The present-day fort consists of a defensive structure and six palaces, two of which were built by the Tomar ruler Man Singh Tomar (r. 1486–1516). It has witnessed the changing fortunes of the Kushanas, the Nagas, the Guptas, the Hunas, the Pratiharas, the Kachchhapaghatas, the Tomaras, the Pathans (Sultanate), the Surs, the Mughals, the English, the Jats, and the Scindias.

The fort's palaces are Man Mandir, Vikram Mandir, Karn Palace, Shah Jahan Palace, Jehangir Palace, and Gurjari Mahal. Gurjari Mahal was commissioned by Man Singh Tomar for his ninth wife, Mrignayani, who belonged to the Gurjar community.

A stone inscription on the wall of Chaturbhuj Temple (also known as Zero Temple), near the top of the fort, contains the second-oldest known record (after the Bakhshali manuscript) of the numeral zero with a place value as used in decimal notation. The inscription is about 1,500 years old.

== Etymology ==
The fort is associated with a local legend, and the date of its construction is unknown. According to this legend, a king named Suraj Sen ruled the region around the third century CE. He had leprosy, which was incurable at the time. One day, while hunting on Gopgiri (Gop mountain), he met a sage named Gwalipa (or Galav) who cured his disease by asking him to drink water from a sacred pond. When the king was cured, he decided to build a wall around the pond (later known as Suraj Kund), constructed the fort on the Gop Hill and named it "Gwalior" ("abode of Saint Gwalipa"). A city then developed around the fort. Sanskrit inscriptions and Gupta-period records refer to the site as Gop Parvat (Gop Mountain), Gopachala Durg, Gopgiri and Gopadiri, all of which mean "cowherd's hill".

== Topography ==
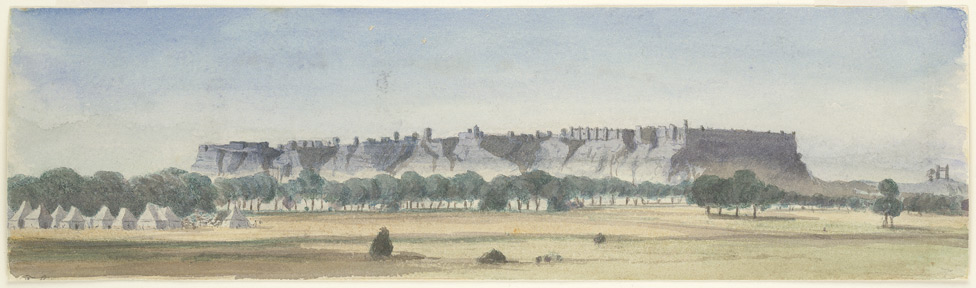
Gwalior Fort seen from the Residency (10 December 1868)

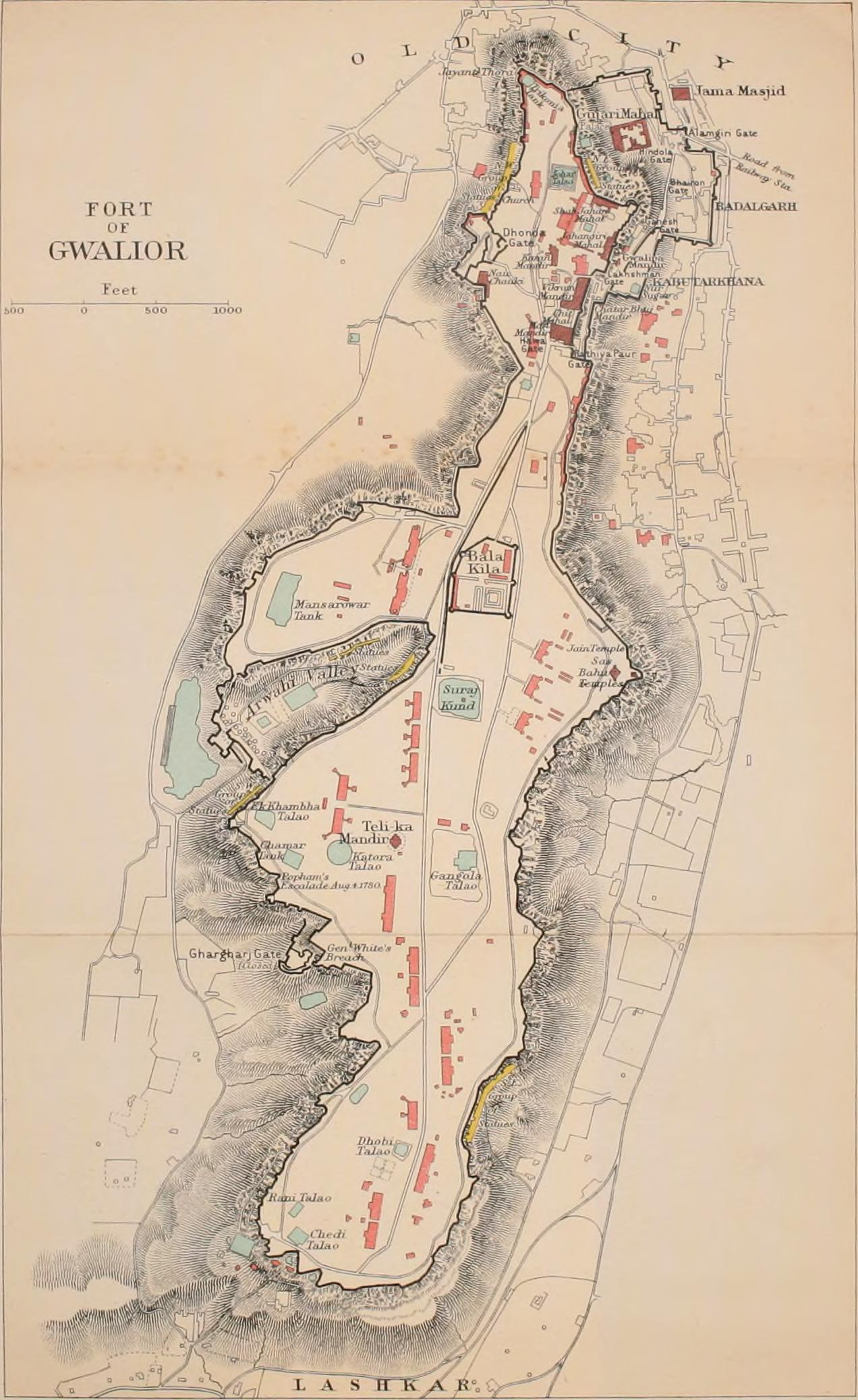
1911 Gwalior Fort map

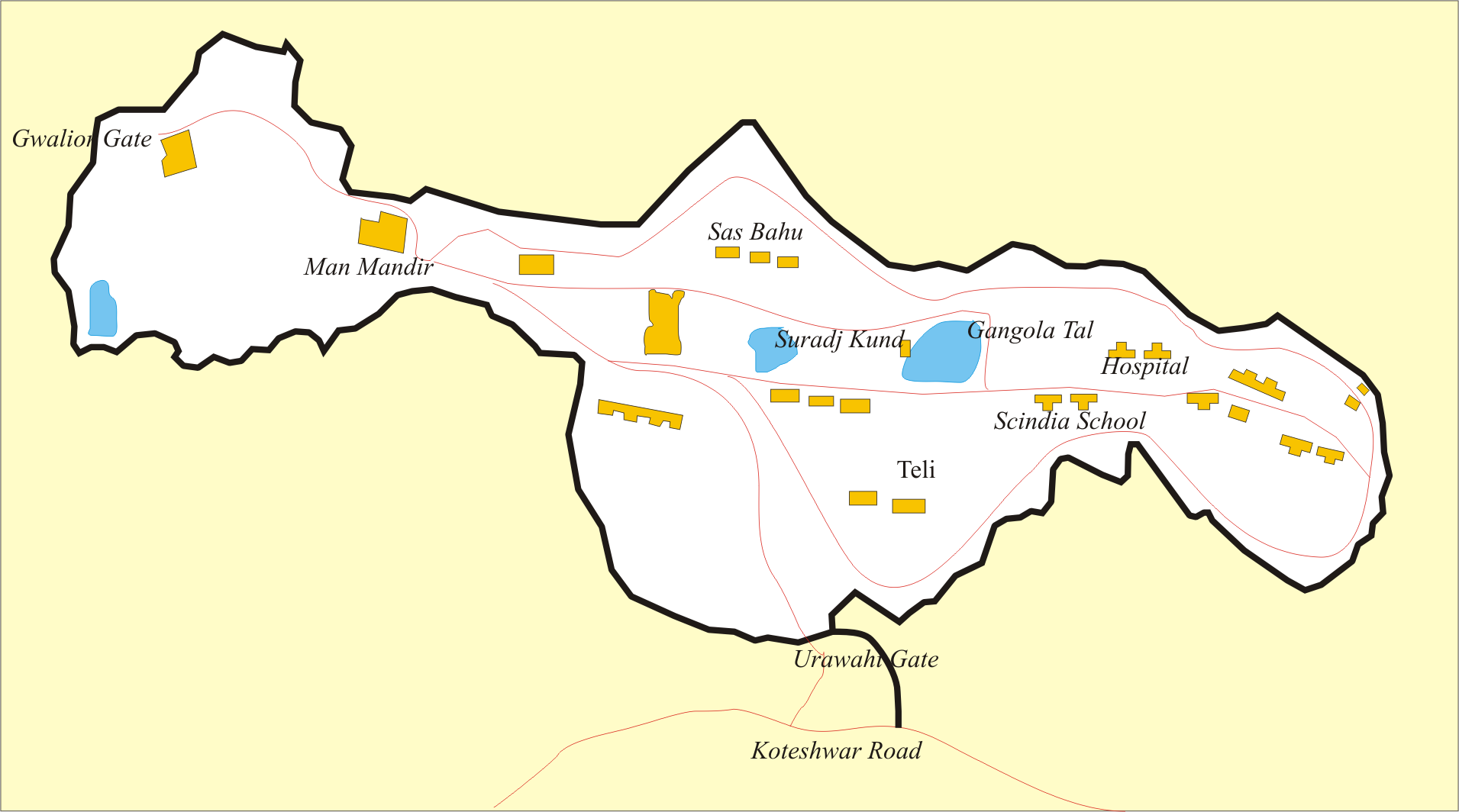
2008 map of the fort

The rock formations of the Gwalior range consist of ochre-coloured Vindhyan sandstone overlain by basalt. Gwalior Fort is built atop a long, thin, solitary ridge called Gopachal. It rises to 342 feet (104 m) at its highest point, extending about 1.5 miles (2.4 km) in length, with an average width of about 1,000 yards (910 m). The fort has a near-perpendicular precipice. A small river, the Swarnrekha, flows nearby.

== History ==
Inscriptions and monuments in the fort complex indicate that it may have existed as early as the beginning of the sixth century. The inscription of Mihirakula describes a sun temple built during the reign of the Huna emperor Mihirakula in the sixth century.

The fort definitely existed by the eighth century, when it is first mentioned in historical records. During the 11th century, Muslim dynasties began attacking it. In 1022, Mahmud of Ghazni besieged the fort for four days. According to Tabaqat-i-Akbari, he lifted the siege in return for 35 elephants. Bahauddin Tourghil, a senior slave of Ghurid ruler Muhammad of Ghor, captured the fort in 1196 after a long siege. The Delhi Sultanate briefly lost the fort before it was recaptured by Iltutmish in 1232.

In 1398, it came under the control of the Tomars. The most distinguished Tomar ruler was Maan Singh, who commissioned several monuments in the fort. The Delhi Sultan Sikander Lodi unsuccessfully tried to capture the fort in 1505. Another attack, by his son Ibrahim Lodi in 1516, resulted in Maan Singh's death. The Tomars surrendered the fort to the Delhi Sultanate after a year-long siege.

Mughal emperor Babur captured the fort within a decade, losing it to Sher Shah Suri in 1542. It was then captured and used by the Hindu general Hemu (the last Hindu ruler of Delhi) as a base for his campaigns, but Babur's grandson Akbar recaptured it in 1558. Akbar made the fort a prison for political prisoners; Abu'l-Kasim, son of Kamran and Akbar's first cousin, was held and executed at the fort.

On 24 June 1606, 11-year-old Guru Hargobind was crowned as the sixth Sikh guru. At his succession ceremony, he put on two swords; one indicated his spiritual authority (piri), and the other his temporal authority (miri). Because of the execution of Guru Arjan by Mughal Emperor Jahangir, Guru Hargobind from the very start was a dedicated enemy of the Mughal rule. He advised the Sikhs to arm themselves and fight. The death of his father at the hands of Jahangir prompted him to emphasise Sikh militarism. Jahangir jailed the 14-year-old Guru Hargobind at Gwalior Fort in 1609 on the pretext that a fine imposed on Guru Arjan had not been paid by the Sikhs and Guru Hargobind. It is unclear how long he was imprisoned, but he was apparently released in 1611 or 1612 at about age 16. Persian records such as Dabistan i Mazahib suggest that he was kept in jail for twelve years (including 1617–1619 in Gwalior), after which he and his camp were kept under Muslim army surveillance by Jahangir. According to Sikh tradition, Guru Hargobind was released from prison on Diwali; this is commemorated in the Bandi Chhor Divas festival.

Aurangzeb's brother Murad Bakhsh and nephew Sulaiman Shikoh were executed in the Man Mandir palace. Sipihr Shikoh was imprisoned at the fort from 1659 to 1675. Aurangzeb's son, Muhammad Sultan was imprisoned there from January 1661 to December 1672. The ruler of Gohad, Bhim Singh Rana, seized the fort in the 1740 Battle of Gwalior after Aurangzeb's death, when the Marathas had captured Mughal territory in northern and central India. The Maratha incursions into North India were raids by the Peshwa Bajirao. In 1755–1756, Marathas led by the Scindias seized the fort by defeating the Gohad ruler. Maratha general Mahadaji Shinde captured the fort from the Gohad Rana Chhatar Singh, but lost it to the East India Company. On 3 August 1780, a company force under captains Popham and Bruce captured the fort in a nighttime raid. Both sides had less than 20 wounded. That year, the British governor Warren Hastings restored the fort to the Ranas of Gohad. The Marathas recaptured the fort four years later, and the British did not intervene because the Gohad ranas had become hostile to them. Daulat Rao Sindhia lost the fort to the British during the Second Anglo-Maratha War.

Control of the fort alternated frequently between the Scindias and the British between 1808 and 1844. After the December 1843 Battle of Maharajpura, the fort was occupied the following month by the Gwalior State as a British protectorate. About 6,500 sepoys stationed at Gwalior rebelled against company rule during the 1857 uprising, although company vassal Jayajirao Scindia remained loyal to the Raj. The British took control of the fort in June 1858. They rewarded Jayajirao with territory, but retained control of the fort. The British completely controlled India by 1886; with the fort no longer strategically important to them, they handed it over to the Scindias. The Scindias continued to rule Gwalior until the 1947 independence of India and built several monuments, including the Jai Vilas Palace.

In 2025, the government of Madhya Pradesh participated in heritage and tourism-investment initiatives which included proposals for conservation and development linked to the fort and the region's broader cultural network. Investment proposals of about ₹3,500 crore were discussed at a state tourism gathering; plans included works and infrastructure improvements benefitting historic sites such as Gwalior Fort and its surrounding monuments.

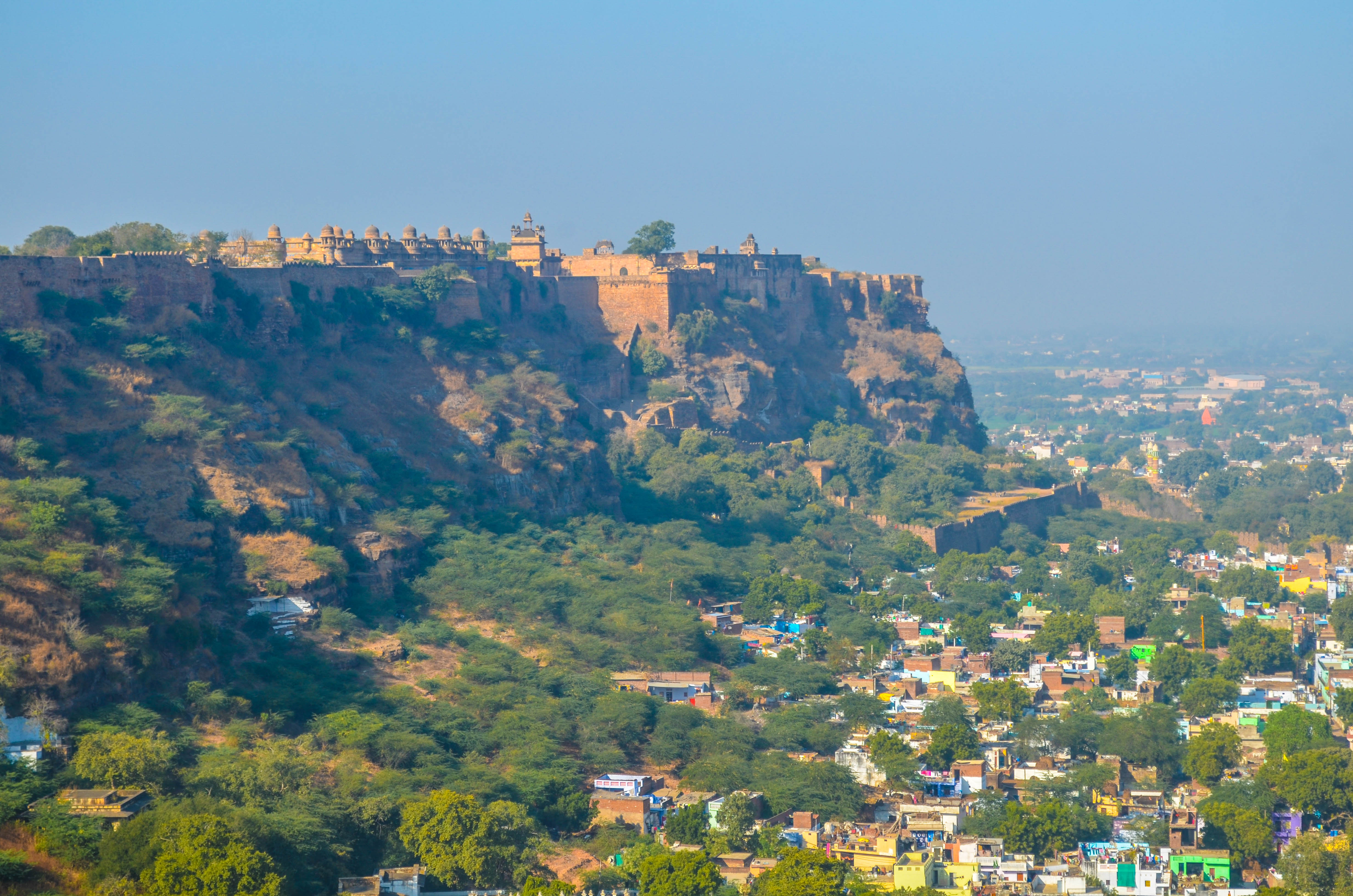
Aerial view of the fort

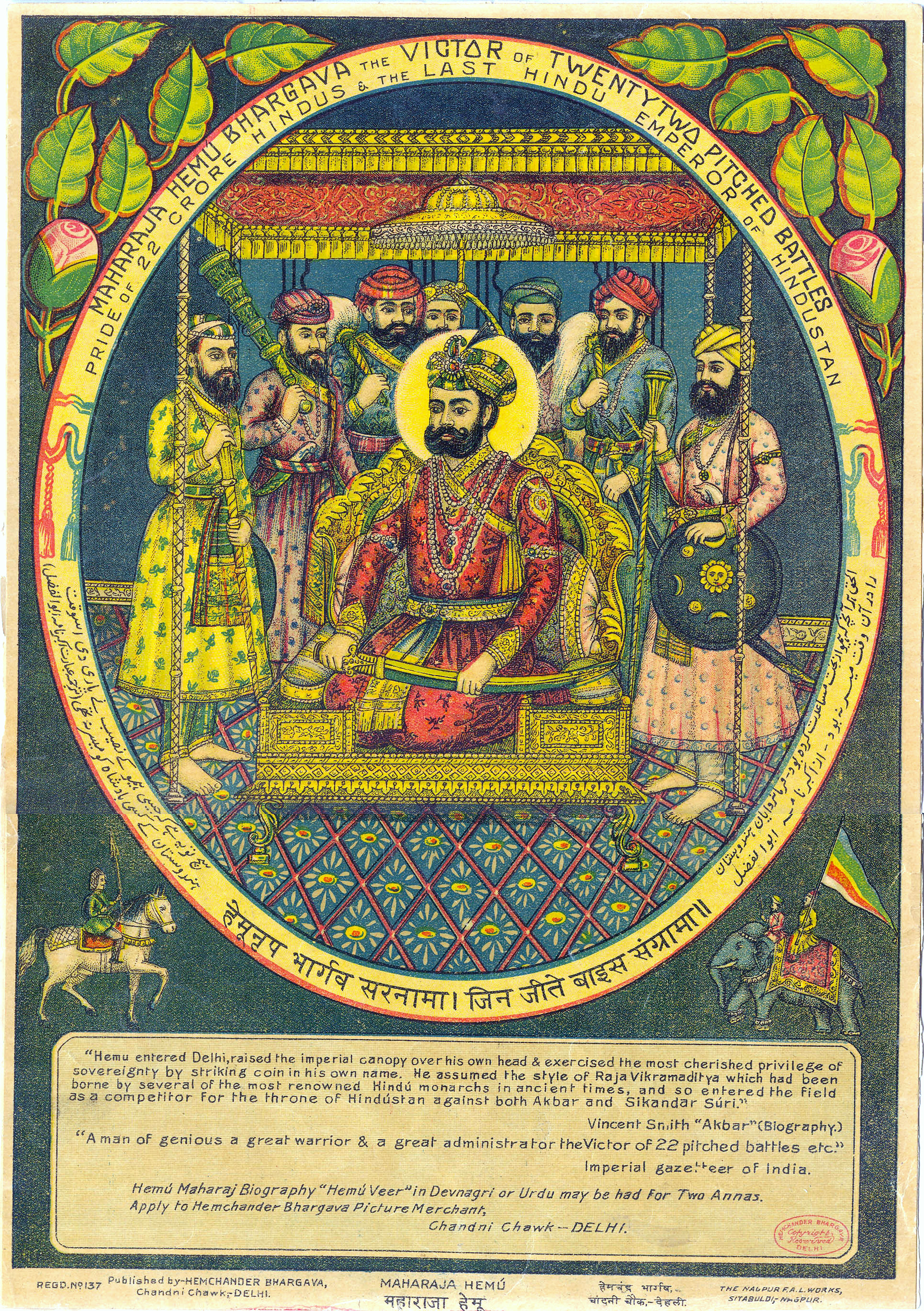
It was the base for many of Hemu's campaigns.

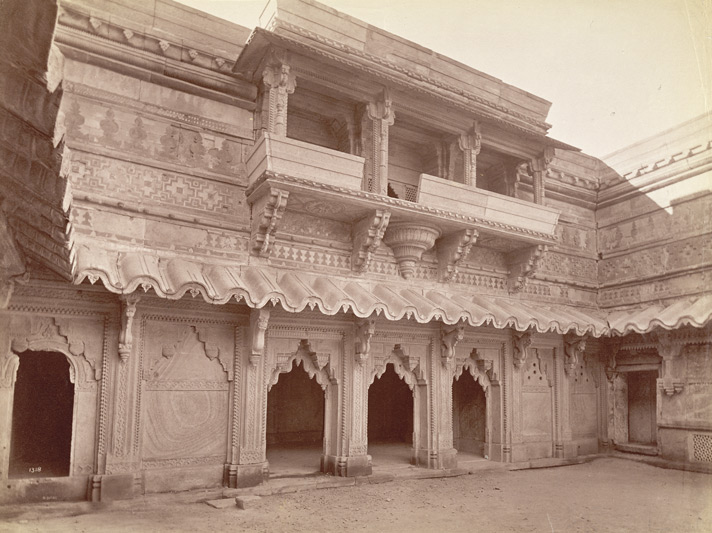
Courtyard of Maan Mandir, built by Raja Man Singh Tomar

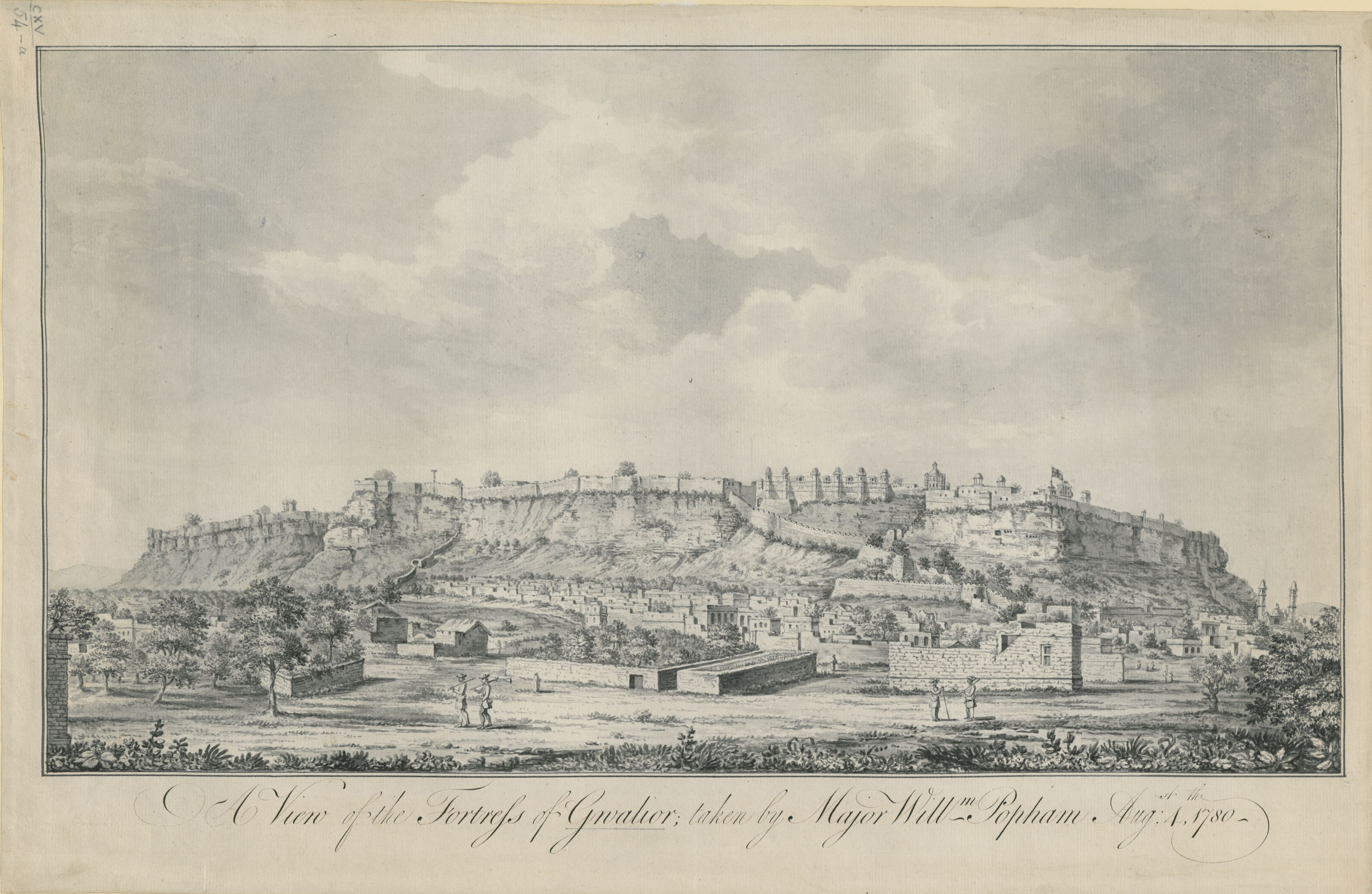
1780 view of the fort

== Structures ==
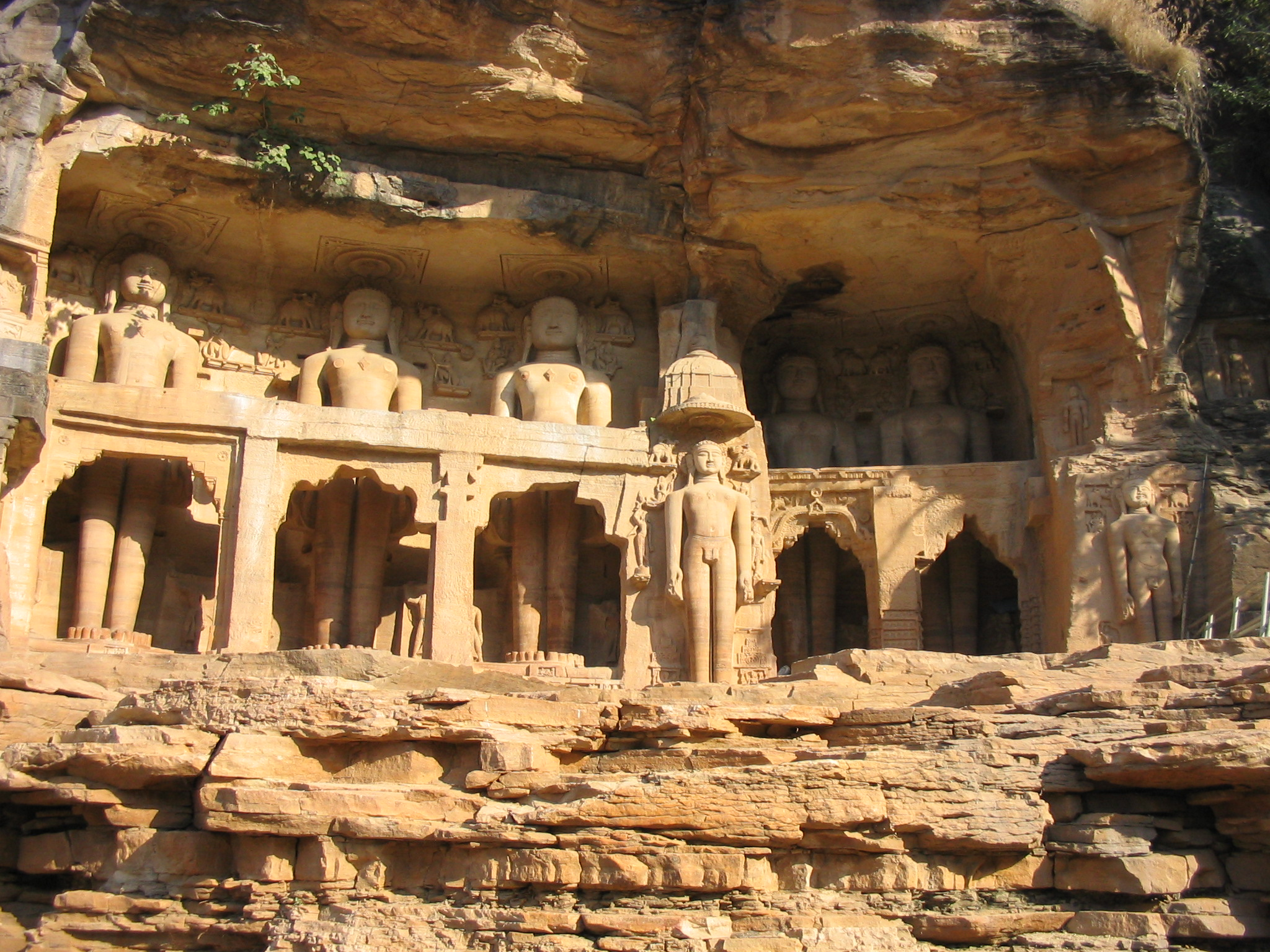
Jain sculptures at the fort

The fort is well-maintained and houses a number of historic monuments, including palaces, temples and water tanks. Palaces (mahal) include the Man mandir palace, the Gujari mahal, the Jahangir palace, the Karan palace, the Vikram mahal and the Shah Jahan palace.

It covers 3 square kilometres (1.2 sq mi), rising 11 metres (36 ft) above the surrounding terrain. The fort's ramparts are built around the edge of the hill, and are connected by six bastions. There are two gates: one on the northeast side, with a long access ramp, and the other on the southwest. The main entrance is the ornate Elephant Gate (Hathi Pol), and the other is the Badalgarh Gate. The Man mandir palace (citadel) is at the northeast end of the fort. Built during the 15th century, it was refurbished in 1648.

The second-oldest record of zero in the world was found in a small temple; the stone inscription has the second-oldest record of the numeric zero symbol with a place value, as in present-day decimal notation. The inscription is about 1,500 years old.

=== Monuments ===
==== Jain temples ====
The Siddhachal Caves date to the 15th century. Eleven Jain temples in the fort are dedicated to the tirthankaras; 21 temples are cut into the rock on the southern side, with intricately-carved images of the tirthankaras. The tallest idol, an image of Rishabhanatha (or Adinatha, the first tirthankara), is 58 feet 4 inches (17.78 m) high.

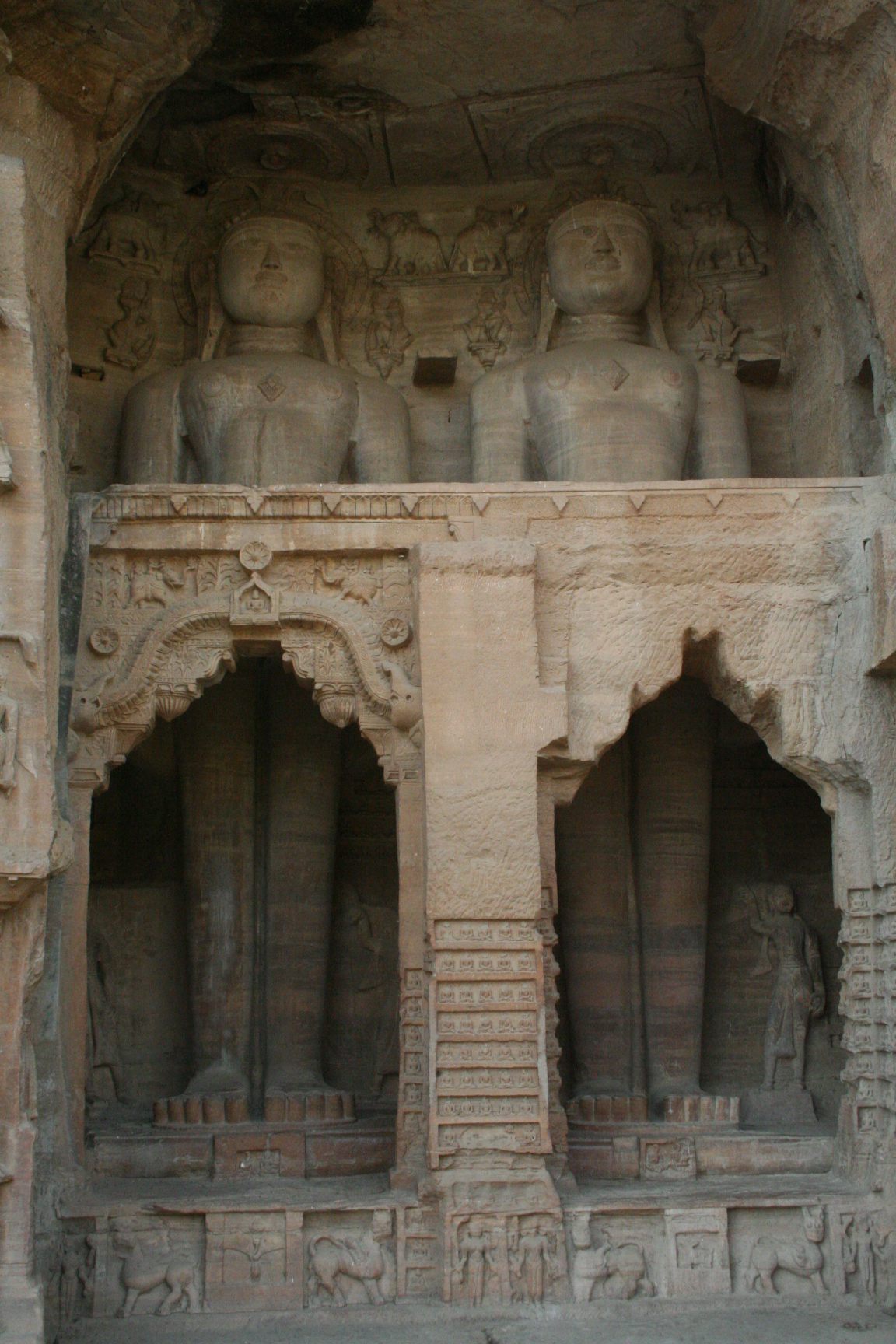
Jain figures carved from rock at Gopachal, near Phoobagh, Gwalior

The fort complex is divided into five areas: Urvahi, Northwest, Northeast, Southwest, and Southeast. The Urvahi area contains 24 idols of tirthankaras in the padmasana posture, 40 in the kayotsarga posture, and about 840 idols carved into walls and pillars. The largest idol is a 17.8-metre (58 ft) statue of Adinatha outside the Urvahi Gate, and a 10.7-metre (35 ft) idol of Suparshvanatha in the padmasana posture is in the Ek Paththar-ki Bawari ("stone tank") area.

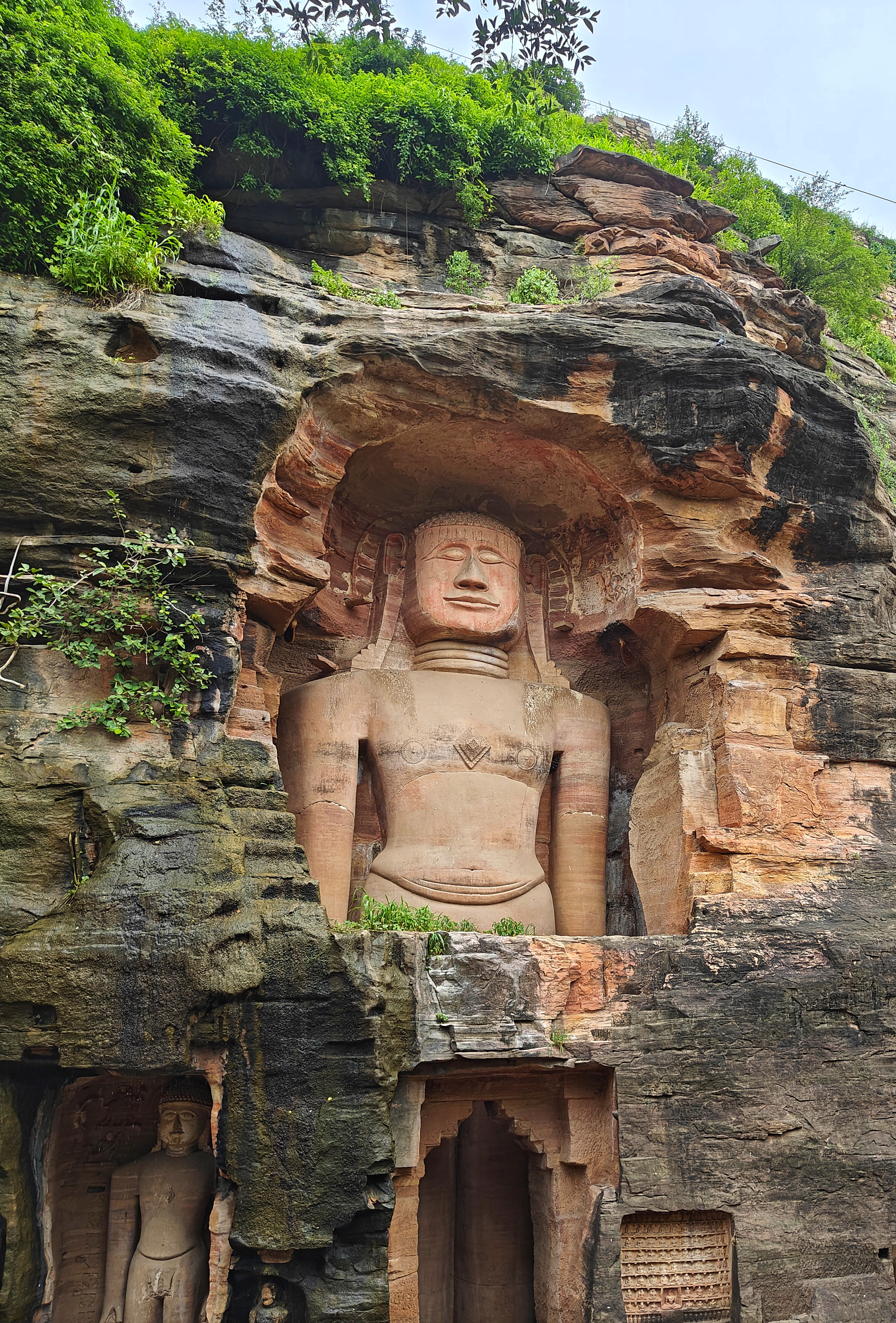
58-foot (18 m) statue of Bhagwan Adinatha

About 1,500 idols are on Gopachal Hill, ranging in height from six inches to 57 feet. Gopachal contains a statue of Bhagwan Parsvanath in padmasan posture, 42 feet high and 30 feet wide. This is where Shri 1008 Supratishtha Kevali was traditionally believed to have attained nirvana. There are 26 more Jain temples on the hill. Babur's army attacked the fort in 1527 and defaced the statues, which have survived in fairly good condition.

==== Teli Temple ====
Teli ka Mandir is a Hindu temple built by the Pratihara emperor Mihira Bhoja. The oldest part of the fort, it has a blend of south and north Indian architectural styles. The rectangular building contains a shrine and a South Indian barrel-vaulted roof on top. It has a masonry tower in the North Indian Nagara architectural style with a barrel vaulted roof 25 metres (82 ft) high. Niches in the outer walls once held statues, and have chandrashalas (horseshoe-arch) vent openings in the North Indian style. The chandrashala has been compared to a trefoil: a honeycomb design with a series of receding pointed arches within an arch. The entrance door has an archway with sculpted images of river goddesses, romantic couples, foils and a Garuda. Vertical bands on either side of the door are simply decorated with badly-damaged sculptures. Above the door are a small group of discs representing the dama laka (finial) of a shikhara. The temple was originally dedicated to Shakti. Severely damaged during Muslim raids, it was restored as a Shiva temple by installing a liṅga and retained Vaishnava motifs such as the Garuda. The temple was refurbished between 1881 and 1883.

==== Garuda monument ====
The Garuda monument, near the Teli Temple, is dedicated to Vishnu and the fort's highest. It combines Muslim and Indian architecture.

==== Saas Bahu temples ====
The twin Saas Bahu temples were built in 1092–93. Dedicated to Aniruddha and Shiva, the pyramidal temples are made of red sandstone and have several stories of beams and pillars.

==== Gurdwara Data Bandi Chhor ====
Gurdwara Data Bandi Chhor was built during the 1970s and 1980s where the Sikh Guru Hargobind was arrested and held by the Mughal Emperor Jahangir in 1609 at age 14 because a fine imposed on his father, Guru Arjan, had not been paid by the Sikhs or Guru Hargobind.

=== Man Mandir palace ===
The Man Mandir palace was built by Man Singh Tomar during the 15th century. It was known as the Painted Palace due to its turquoise, green and yellow tiles laid in a geometric pattern. The Hathi Pol (or Hathiya Paur) is the principal entrance, on the southeast, and is the last of a series of seven gates. It is named for a life-sized statue of an elephant (hathi) which adorned the gate. The stone gate has cylindrical towers crowned with cupolas. Parapets link the cupolas.

A chhatri (dome-shaped pavilion) was built as a memorial to Gohad ruler Bhim Singh Rana (1707–1756) by his successor, Chhatra Singh. Bhim Singh Rana occupied the fort when Mughal satrap Ali Khan surrendered. In 1754, Bhim Singh built a lake as a monument at the fort.

Assi Khambo Ki Baoli, near the palace, is a baoli with 80 pillars and a number of chambers. It was built by Man Singh Tomar around 1500 CE. According to tradition, it was constructed in five days by Hindu engineers. The baoli stored water during a 1505 siege of Gwalior.

=== Museum ===
The Gurjari Mahal (the present-day Gujari Mahal Archaeological Museum) was built by Man Singh Tomar for his wife, Mrignayani, a Gurjar princess. The palace has been converted into an archaeological museum. Rare artefacts at the museum include Hindu and Jain sculptures dating to the first and second centuries BCE; a miniature statue of Salabhanjika; terracotta items, and replicas of frescoes in the Bagh Caves.

=== Gateways ===
The fort has several gateways, including Alamgiri Darwaza, Ganesha Pol, Chaturbhuj Pol, Urvai Pol, Laxman Pol, Badal Pol and Hathi Pol.

== Gallery ==
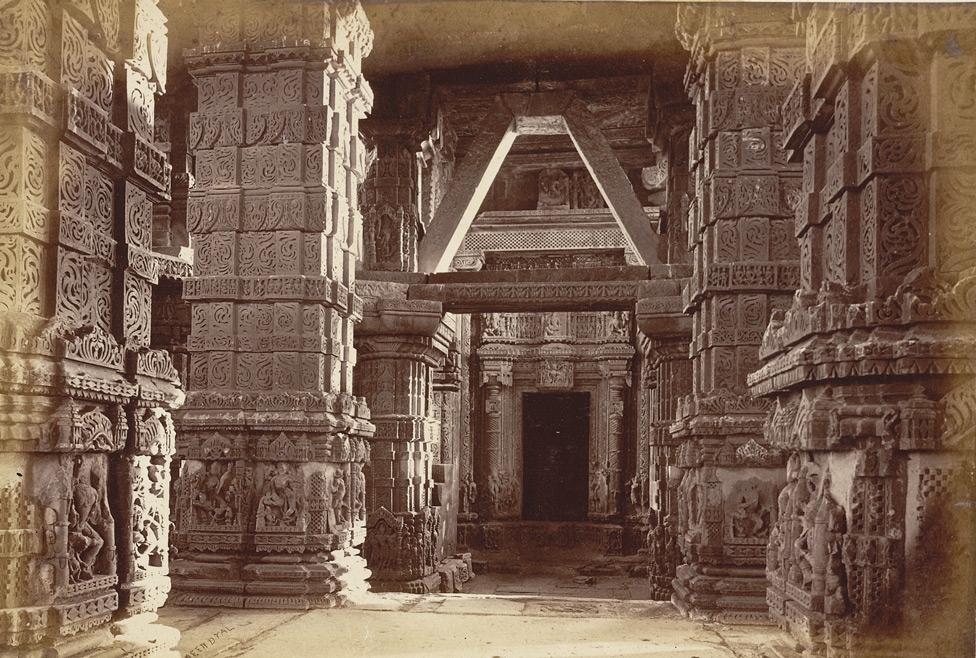
Interior of a Saas Bahu Temple

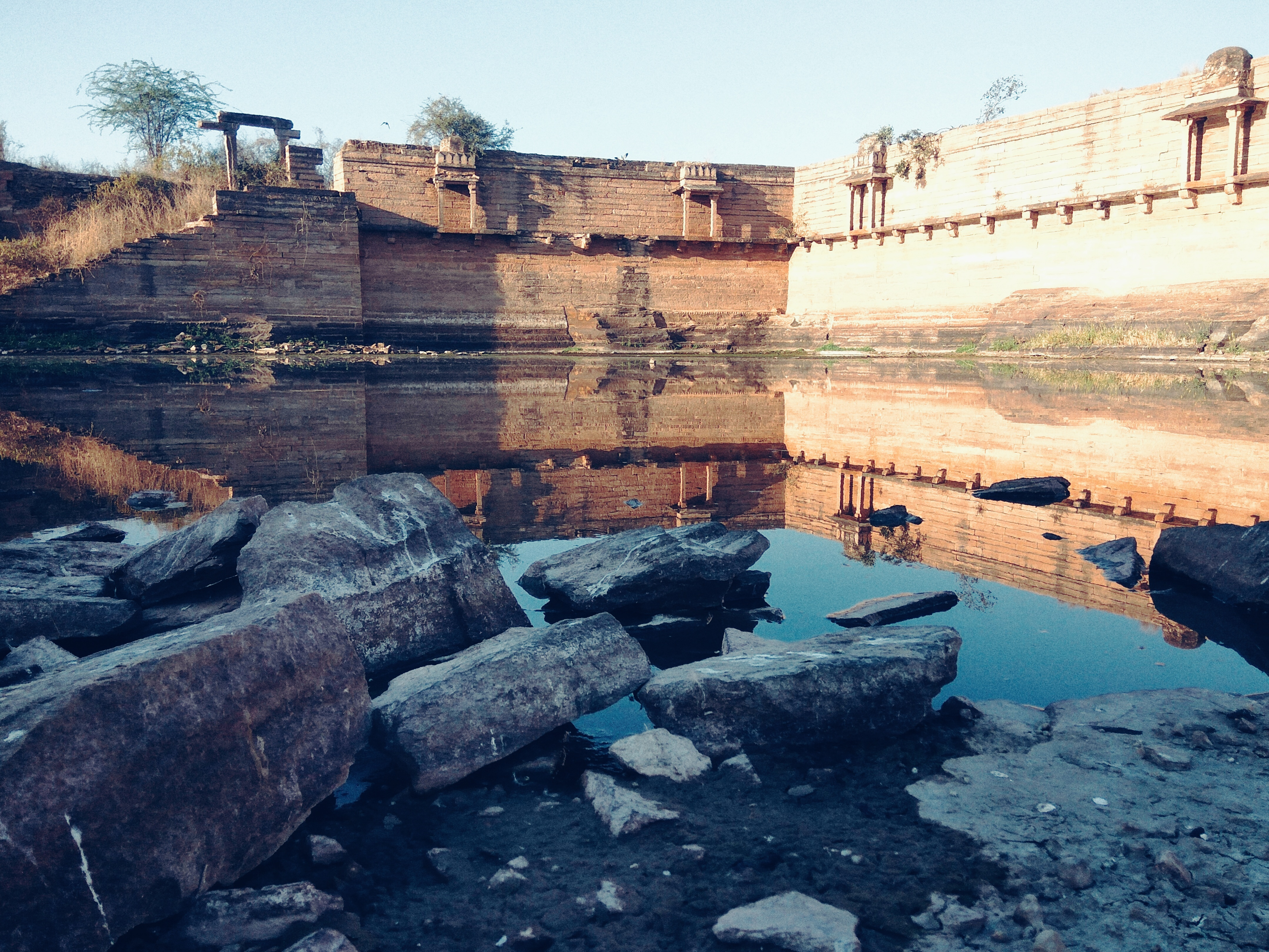
Reservoir at the fort

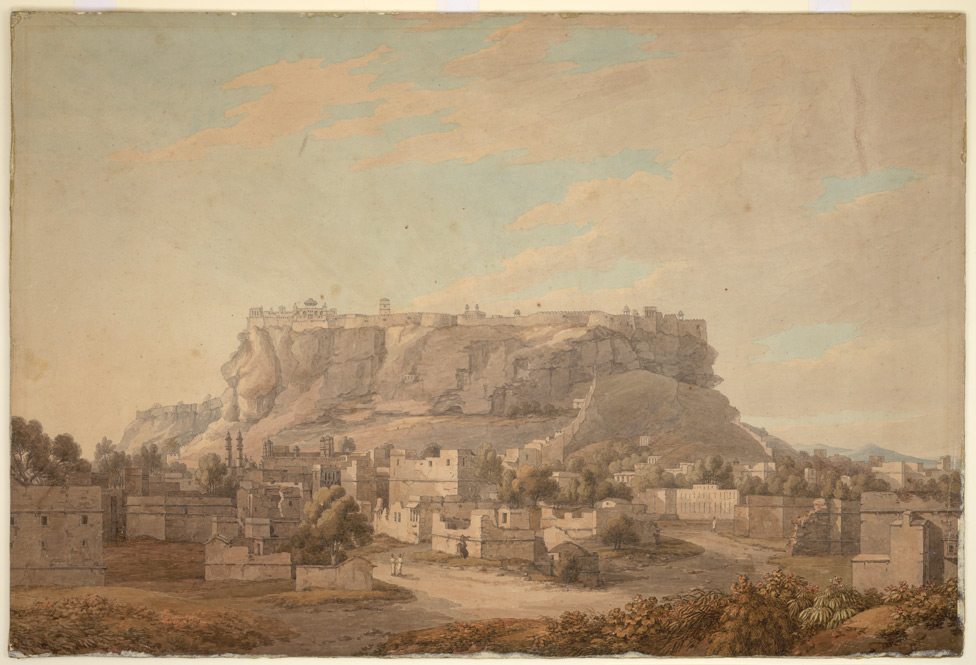
View of the fort from the north-west c. 1790

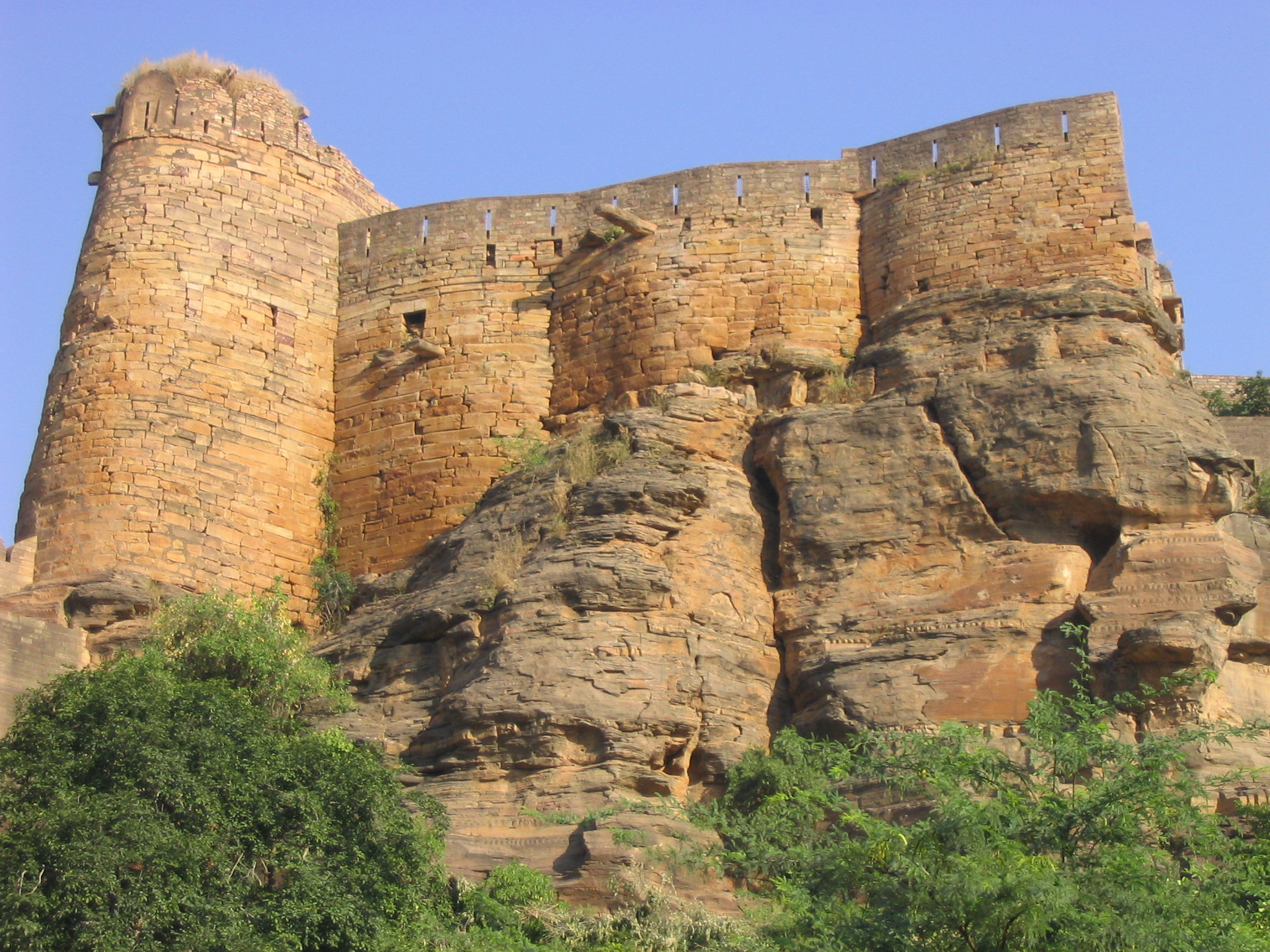
Fort bastions

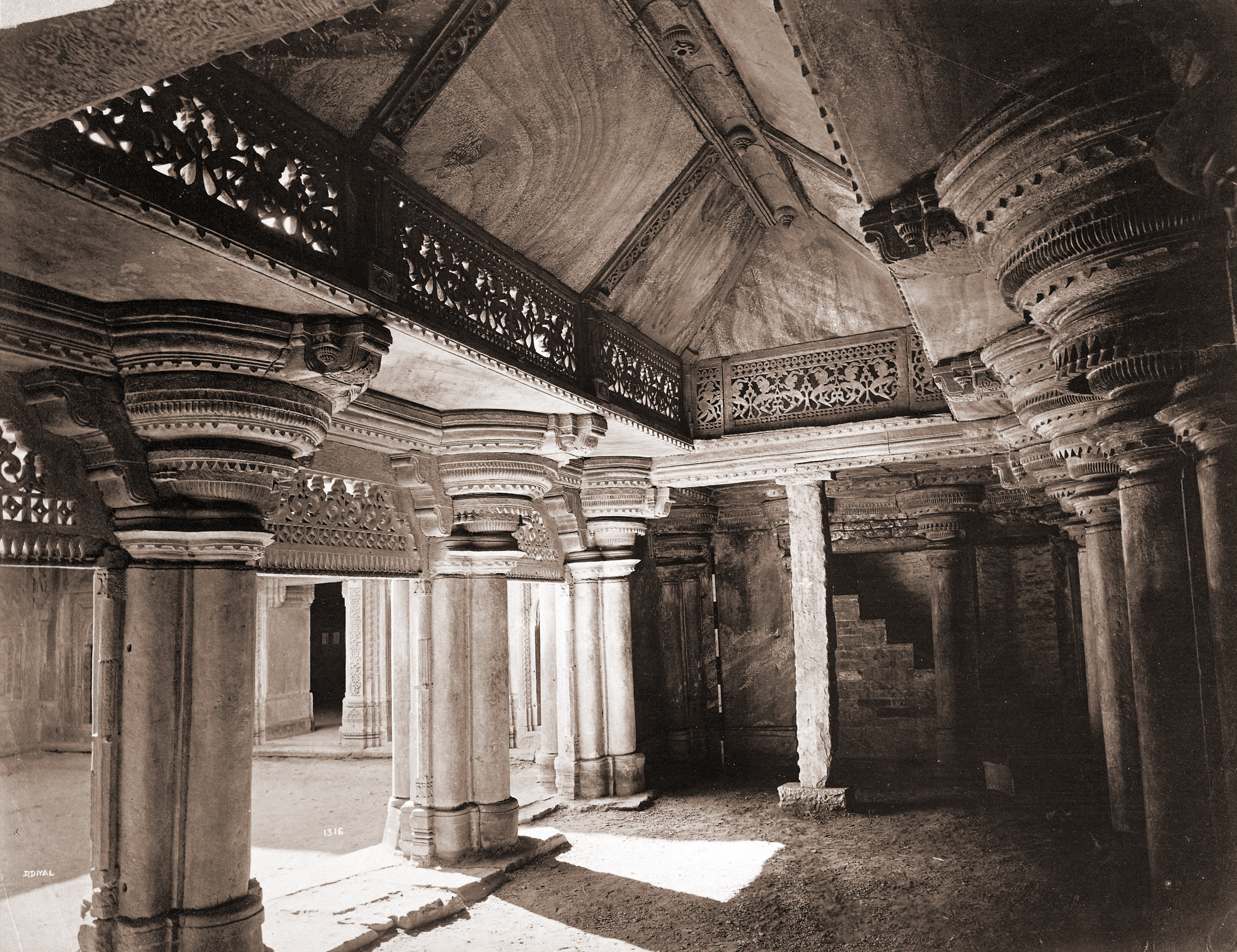
Man Mandir north room

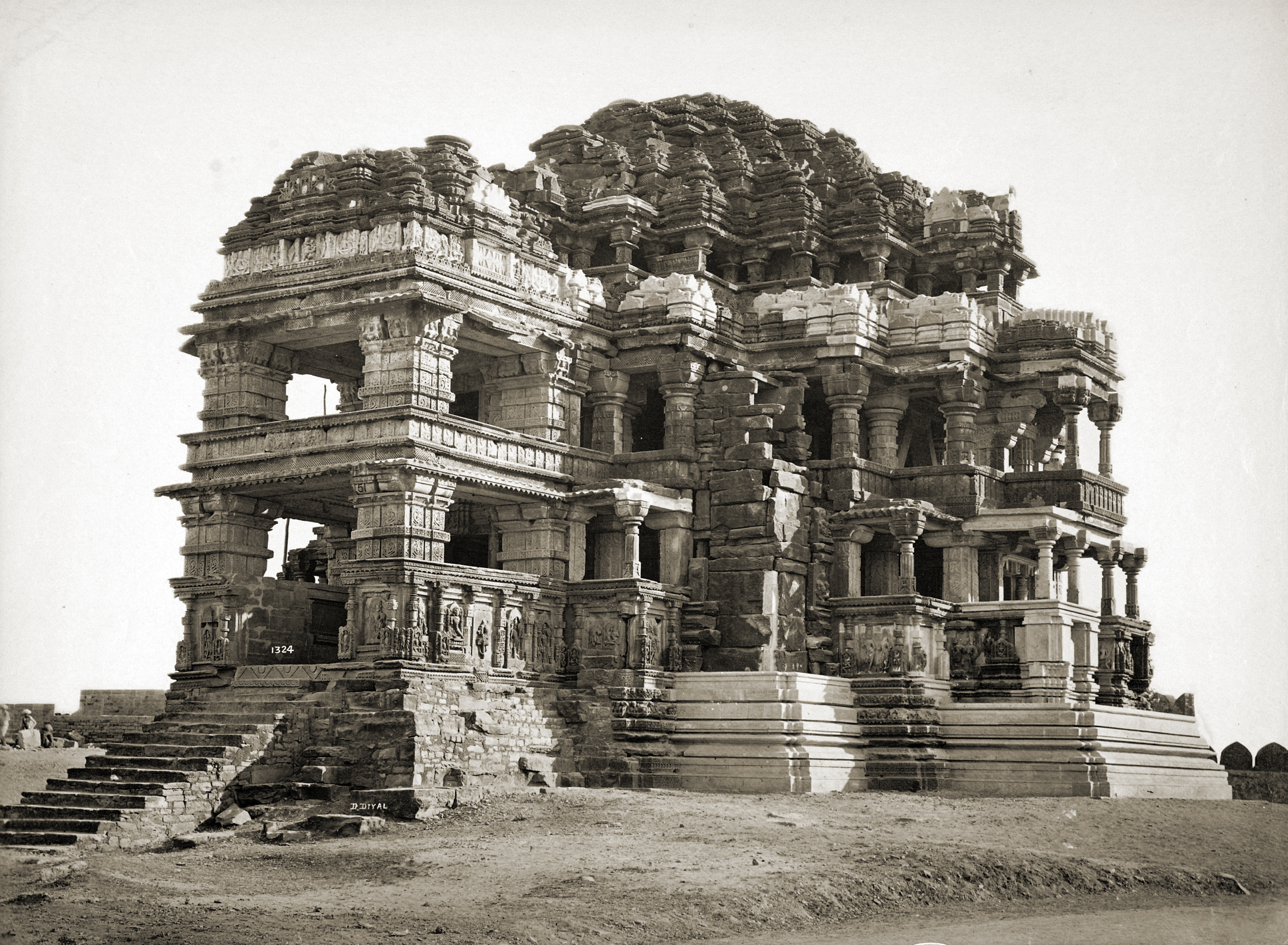
A Sas-Bahu temple, built by the Kachchhapaghata dynasty

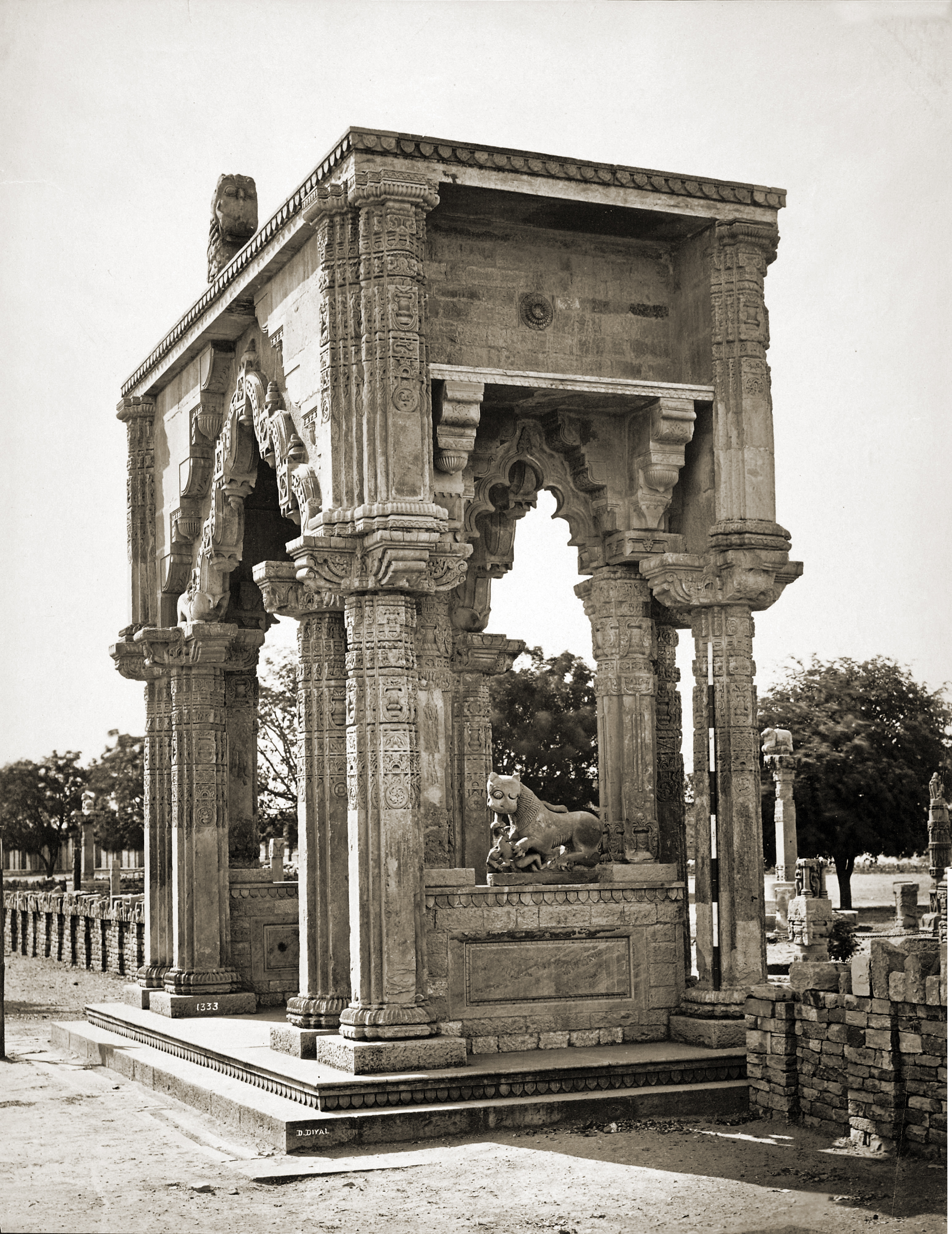
Teli Temple gate

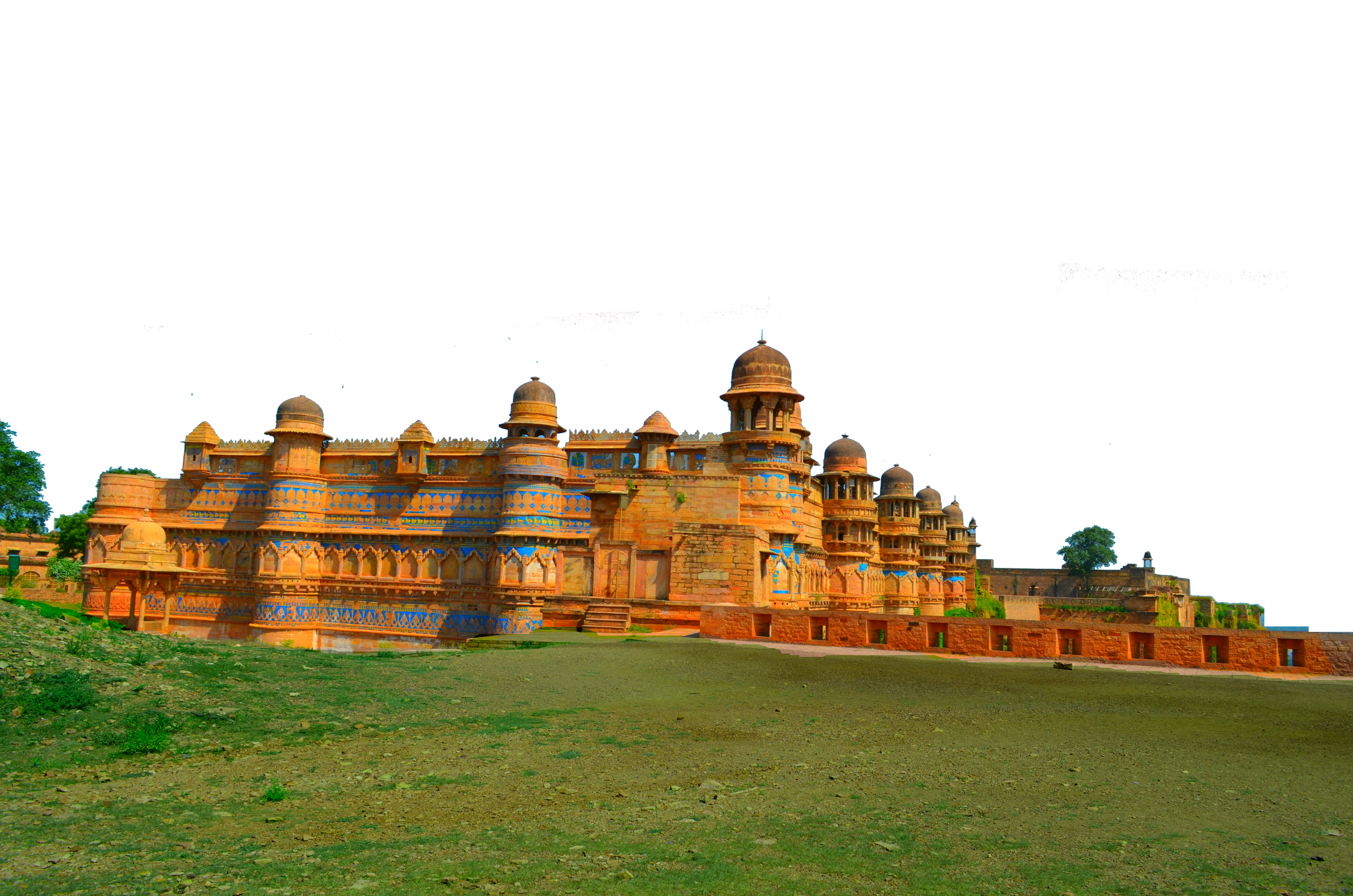
The fort in the morning

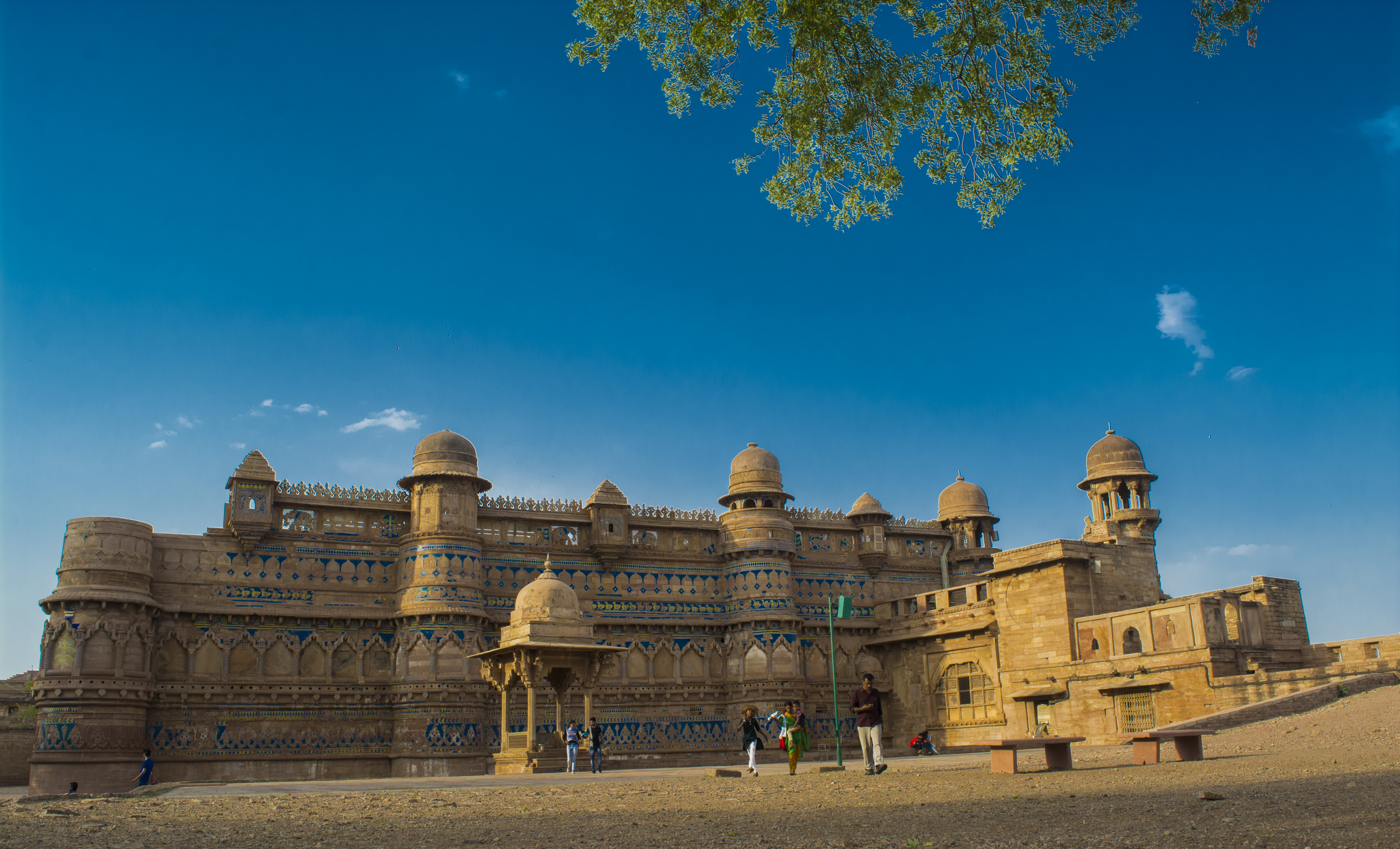
The fort in shadow

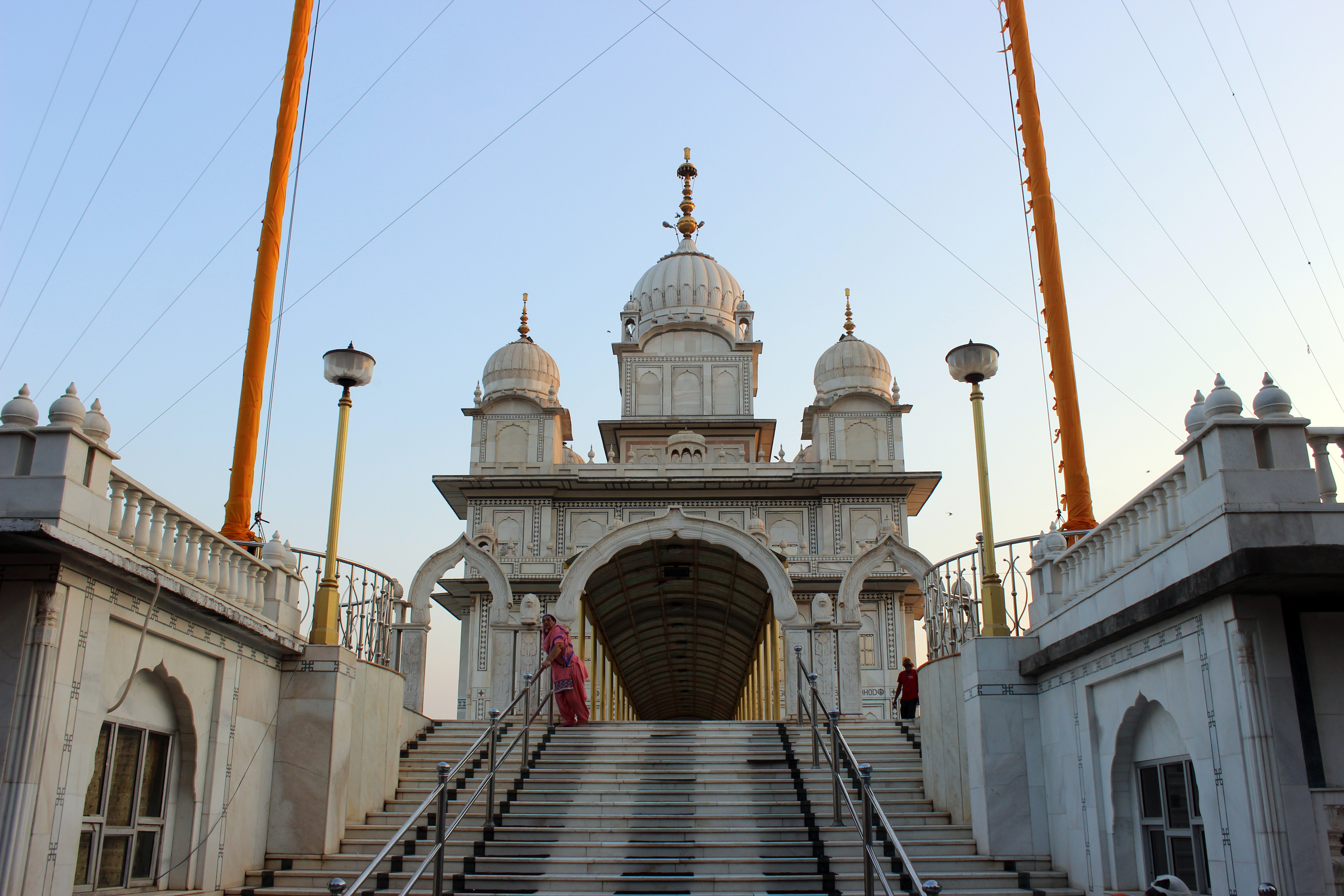
Gurudwara Shri Data Bandi Chhor Shahib

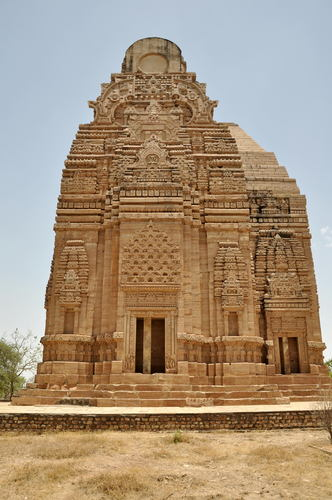
Teli Temple, built by Mihira Bhoja

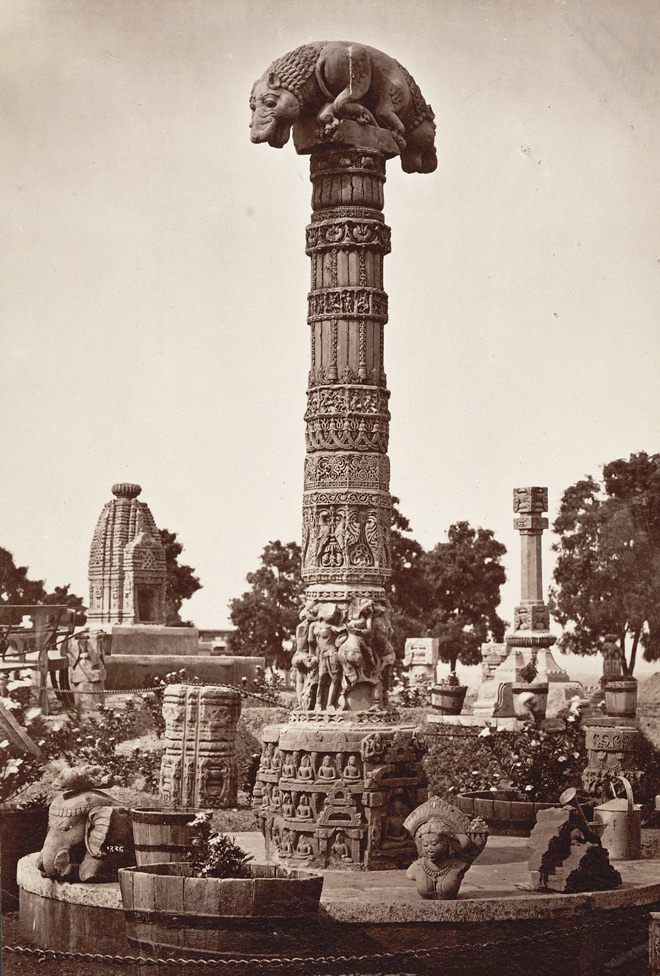
Sculptures near Teli Temple
