= Kapasan =

- City
- Location in Rajasthan, India Kapasan (India)
- Coordinates: 24°54′N 74°20′E
- Country: India
- State: Rajasthan
- District: Chittaurgarh

Area
  - Total: 37 km^{2} (14 sq mi)

Population (2020)
  - Total: 18,705
  - Density: 510/km^{2} (1,300/sq mi)

Languages
  - Official: Hindi
- Time zone: UTC+5:30 (IST)
- Postal code: 312202
- ISO 3166 code: RJ-IN
- Vehicle registration: RJ09-

Kapasan is a city and a municipality in Chittaurgarh district in the Indian state of Rajasthan.

== Demographics ==
Kapasan has a municipal board. It is a constituency of Rajasthan Legislative assembly. As of 2001 India census, Kapasan had a population of 18,705. Males constitute 51% of the population and females 49%. Kapasan has an average literacy rate of 63%, higher than the national average of 59.5%: male literacy is 75%, and female literacy is 51%. In Kapasan, 15% of the population is under 6 years of age.

== Notable incidents ==
In September 2025, a young man named Suraj Mali was allegedly assaulted by masked attackers in Kapasan, after posting videos on social media addressing MLA Arjunlal Jeengar and reminding him of his election promise to bring water from the Matrikundia dam to Kapasan pond. Four days after the attack, police arrested three accused.

In response, RLP chief Hanuman Beniwal led a 13-day protest in Kapasan demanding justice for Suraj Mali. During the agitation, Hanuman Beniwal issued an ultimatum to the administration and announced a potential march toward Chittorgarh district headquarters. The protest concluded after the administration assured an investigation by the Special Operations Group (SOG), compensation of ₹25 lakh to the victim, a contract job, allocation of a shop in the vegetable market, and coverage of medical expenses.
