= Tomaras of Gwalior =

Medieval Jain and Hindu Rajput dynasty of Gwalior

- c.1390–c.1518
- The Tomaras of Gwalior circa 1400, with neighbouring polities.
- Capital: Gwalior
- Religion: Hinduism, Jainism
- History
  - Established: c.1390
  - Disestablished: c.1518
Preceded by	Succeeded by
Tughlaq dynasty	Lodi dynasty
- Today part of: India

The Tomaras of Gwalior (also called Tomar in modern vernaculars because of schwa deletion) were a Rajput dynasty who ruled the Gwalior and its surrounding region in central India during 14th–16th centuries. They are known for their patronage to the music and cultural activities in Gwalior. They have built many palaces and temples inside Gwalior Fort one of being the most famous is the Man Mandir build by Man Singh.

The Tomaras originally held a small fief as feudatories of the Tughlaq dynasty of Delhi Sultanate. In the 1390s, they gained control of Gwalior, and became independent in the subsequent years. They fought several battles with the Delhi rulers to maintain their independence, and paid tribute to Bahlul Lodi to avoid war. They were displaced from Gwalior by Ibrahim Lodi in the first quarter of the 16th century, although their descendants continued to hold fiefs at other places.

== Sources of information ==
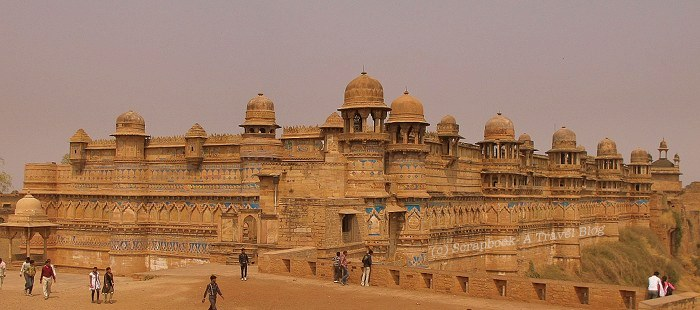
The "Man Mandir" palace built by Tomaras of Gwalior ruler Man Singh Tomar (reigned 1486–1516 CE), at Gwalior Fort.

Much of the information about the Tomaras of Gwalior comes from the Gwalior Fort inscriptions, the contemporary chronicles by Muslim writers, and the various history books on Gwalior (known as Guwaliar-namas). Two notable Guwaliar-namas include Gopachala-Akhyana and Qulyat-i-Guwaliari.

The Gopachala-Akhyana of Khadagrai exists in several different manuscripts. It was written in Hindi for the Tomara chief Krishna-simha, who was a descendant of the Tomara kings of Gwalior. The text was composed during the reign of the Mughal emperor Shah Jahan. A later manuscript contains several omissions from and additions to the original text, and covers the history of Gwalior down to its conquest by the Maratha general Mahadaji Scindia.

Qulyat-i-Guwaliari was also written during the reign of Shah Jahan, by Syed Fazl Ali Shah Kadiri Chishti. The author cites Tarikh-i-nama by Ghanshyam Brahmana as his source for the history of Gwalior. Chishti's genealogy of the Gwalior rulers is contradicted by other sources, including Gopachala-Akhyana, the Muslim chronicles, and the Tomara inscriptions. For example, he uses the name "Paramala-deva" for the first Tomara ruler Virasimha, and claims that the king belonged to the Paramara clan. A later manuscript contains several additions to the original work, and covers the history of Gwalior down to its conquest by the British General Popham.

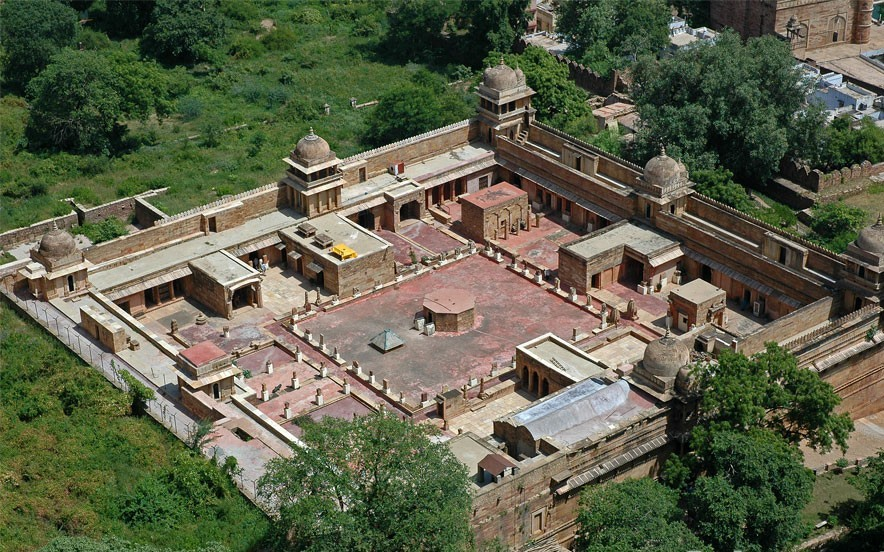
The Gujari Mahal at Gwalior Fort was built by Man Singh Tomar.

Other Guwaliar-nama texts include:

- Guwaliar-nama of Badili Das; a continuation of Khadag Rai's book
- Guwaliar-nama of Hiraman B. Girdhardas, a Munshi of Motmid Khan
- Guwaliar-nama of Motiram and Khushal, commissioned by Captain William Bruce after the British conquest of Gwalior
- Guwaliar-nama of Khan Jahan and Shaikh Jalal Hisar

== Origin ==
The Tomaras claimed to be Rajputs. The 1631 Rohtas Fort inscription states that the Tomaras belonged to the lunar race (Somavaṃśa), and traces their ancestry to the legendary king Pandu. The various medieval chronicles connect the Tomaras of Gwalior to the Tomaras of Delhi, whose power had declined after the Chahamana and the Ghurid invasions of Delhi in the 12th century. Like the Rohtas inscription, Khadagrai's Gopachala-Akhyana traces the ancestry of the Tomaras to the lunar deity Chandra. Its different manuscripts differ about the number of kings who preceded Virasimha, the first Tomara ruler of Gwalior. One manuscript states that as many as 208 Tomara kings preceded Virasimha. These manuscripts count the legendary king Janamejaya and the Delhi Tomara king Anangapala among his ancestors. The historicity of these records is disputed.

The various sources provide different names for Virasimha's grandfather. Virasimhavaloka, which was composed during Virasimha's reign, names his father as Devabrahma (or "Devavarmma" in one manuscript), and his grandfather as Kamalasimha. Later sources, which appear to be inaccurate, give different names for these two people. For example, one manuscript of Khadagrai's Gopachala-Akhyana names the father as Brahmadeva and the grandfather as Ghatama-deva. Another manuscript of the same text names the father as Sultansimha and the grandfather as Kunwarpala, while stating that Brahmadeva is another name for Virasimha.

== History ==
Delhi and Gwalior in present-day India

The Tomaras emerged around Gwalior after the Delhi Sultan Muhammad bin Tughlaq subjugated the last of the Pratihara chiefs in the Gwalior region. In the 14th century, they served as feudatories of the Tughlaq rulers of Delhi. They held a fief in Aisah, which is now a village near Ambah in Morena district. They rendered military service to Firuz Shah Tughlaq until 1380.

=== Virasimha (1394-1400) ===
The earliest known Tomara ruler of Gwalior is Virasimha-deva. The Tarikh-i-Mubarakshahi by Yahya-bin-Ahmad Sirhindi mentions that in 1390-91, the Tughlaq ruler Muhammad Shah (r. 1390–1394) visited Etawah. There, he gave Virasimha a khillat (gift) and sent him back (the text does not mention where Virasimha's fief was located). In 1391-92, Virasimha and some other feudatories revolted against the Sultan. In response, the imperial general Islam Khan defeated him and ransacked his fief.

According to the Gwalior chroniclers Khadagrai and Syed Fazl Ali, after this defeat, Virasimha was made a watchman at the Tughlaq royal palace in Delhi. Khadagrai adds that his successor Uddharana was also summoned to Delhi and made a watchman. Virasimha performed his duty sincerely, and during a heavy rainfall, he did not leave his post unlike the other watchmen. This impressed the Tughlaq Sultan Ala ud-din Sikandar Shah (r. 1394), who gave him the fort of Gwalior as an inam (feudal grant), sometime during January-March 1394. However, the Syed governor of Gwalior refused to hand over the fort to him. Virasimha encamped outside the fort, and gradually befriended the governor. One day, the governor invited Virasimha and his retinue for a dinner, during which Virasimha's soldiers attacked the hosts, and captured the fort. Virasimha declared himself as the master of Gwalior.

A Sanskrit-Nagari inscription from Virasimha's reign has been discovered at the Gangola-tal (pond) in the Gwalior fort. It states that Virasimha and Uddharana defeated the Shakas (Muslims in this context). The year of the inscription is damaged, but based on other details, it appears to have been issued on 4 June 1394.

The rule of Ala ud-din Sikandar Shah lasted for just one month and sixteen days. It appears that his successor Mahmud Shah (r. 1394-1413) did not approve of the transfer of Gwalior to Virasimha. After consolidating his power in Delhi, the new Sultan led an expedition to Gwalior in June 1394. However, a conspiracy by some of his nobles forced him to abandon this mission and return to Delhi. The Muslim chroniclers Yahya, Nizamuddin and Firishta state that Virasimha seized Gwalior treacherously amid the confusion caused by Timur's 1398 invasion of Delhi.

Virasimhavaloka, a work on medicine, was written during the reign of Virasimha. A printed edition of the text attributes its authorship to Virasimha himself, but it was actually written by Sarangadeva at Virasimha's request.

=== Uddharana (1400-1402) ===
Virasimha was succeeded by Uddharana-deva (r. c. 1400-1402). The relationship between these two rulers is not certain. Some sources mention Uddharana as a son of Virasimha: these include the Datia manuscript of Khadagrai's Gopachala-Akhyana, the Yashodhara-Charita of Padmanabha, the Rohtas inscription, and the Narwar inscription. However, Syed Fazl Ali's Qulyat-i-Guwaliari states that he was a brother of Virasimha. The other Muslim chroniclers do not mention him at all, and name his successor Virama as Virasimha's son. The Ujjain manuscript of Gopachala-Akhyana also omits his name. The Yashodhara-Charita was composed during the reign of Virama, so it is more reliable. Therefore, Uddharana was most probably a son of Virasimha.

A Sanskrit-Nagari inscription from Uddharana's reign has also been discovered at the Gangola-tal (pond). This inscription attests that he was the ruler of Gwalior in June 1401, although it is not known when exactly he ascended the throne. His successor Virama had become the ruler of Gwalior by 1402, and according to Syed Fazl Ali, Uddharana ruled Gwalior for 5 years. If this is correct, Uddharana must have ascended the throne around 1397, and his predecessor Virasimha must have ruled Gwalior for around three years, during 1394-1397. However, Sant Lal Katare notes that several sources omit Uddharana's name from the list of Tomara rulers, which suggests that he ruled for a shorter period.

Uddharana's inscription states that he had the Gangola-tal cleaned-up, and also mentions his victory over the Shakas (Muslims). This seems to be a reference to his conquest of the Gwalior fort with Virasimha.

According to some Muslim chronicles, a chief named "Adharan" was killed in 1392-93, by the Delhi general Muqarrab-ul-Malik, for rebelling against the Sultanate. Historian Kishori Saran Lal identified this "Adharan" with Uddharana. However, this identification is not correct, as proved by the 1401 inscription discovered at Gwalior.

=== Virama Deva (Biram Deo) (1402 -1425) ===
Uddharana was succeeded by Virama-deva (r. c. 1402-1423). At the time of his ascension, Mallu Iqbal Khan, the minister of Nasir-ud-Din Mahmud Shah Tughlaq, decided to revive the Delhi Sultanate's prestige by subjugating the chiefs who had declared independence. In 1402, he besieged the Gwalior fort; although he was unable to conquer the fort, he ransacked the surrounding areas. Next year, he launched another attack on the fort. According to Badauni, he was able to capture the fort. However, historian Kishori Saran Lal believes this to be inaccurate, as historical evidence suggests that the fort remained under Tomara rule in the later years.

Sometime later, Virama joined an alliance against Iqbal Khan: his allies included the Etawah ruler Rai Sumer and Rai Jalbahar. When Iqbal Khan marched against them in 1404, the allies took shelter in Etawah, and made peace with Iqbal Khan after a 4-month long siege.

The reign of Virama saw the rise of Jain scholars in Gwalior. Virama's minister Kusharaja encouraged the Kayastha poet Padmanabha to write Yashodhara Charita. Kusharaja also commissioned a temple of Chandraprabha in Gwalior; this temple was replaced by the tomb of the Muslim saint Muhammad Ghaus during the Mughal period. The Jain scholar Nayachandra states that he was inspired to compose Hammira Mahakavya as a challenge, when Virama's courtiers declared that no contemporary poet could compose a poem comparable with the ones written by the ancient poets. Based on this statement, Phyllis Granoff theorizes that the poem was written at the Tomara court, around 1420 CE.

=== Dungarasimha (1425-1459) and Kirtisimha (1459-1479) ===
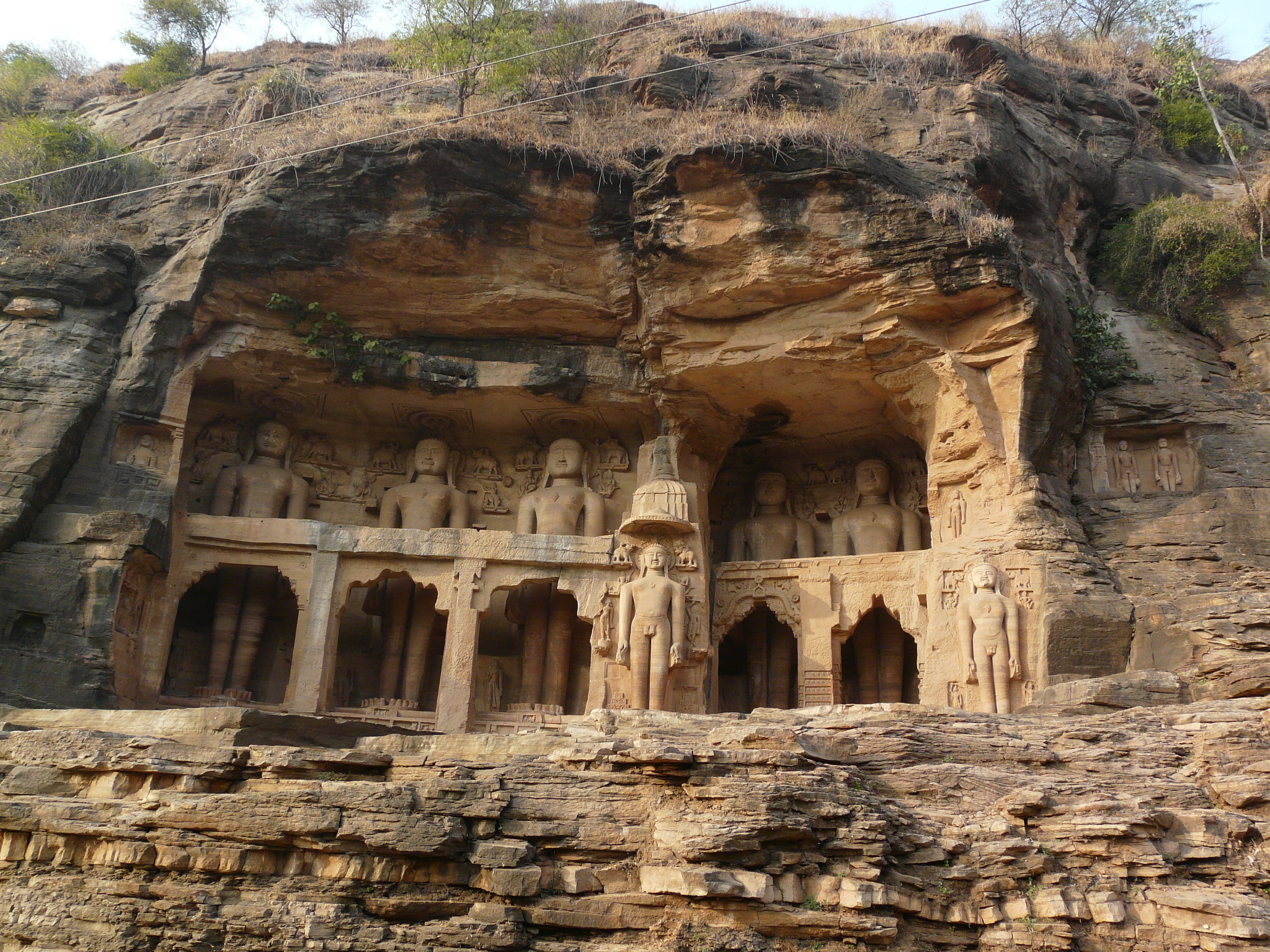
The Jain tirthankara statues at the Gwalior Fort

During the reigns of Dungarasimha and Kirtisimha, the Jain Bhattarakas of the Kashtha Sangha rose to prominence.

There are over 1500 Jain rock carvings inside the Gwalior fort, most of which were carved between 1440 and 1473, during the reigns of Dungarasimha (c. 1425-59) and Kirtisimha (c. 1459-80). According to the Jain poet Raidhu, the development of Gopalagiri (Gwalior fort hill) as a Jain holy place (tirtha) was started by a Jain layman (sanghavi) named Kamalasimha. While this initiative was not a royal project, Raidhu states that Dungarasimha and Kirtisimha offered their full support to Kamalasimha. Raidhu stayed at the Gwalior court at Dungarasimha's invitation. Dungarasimha's minister Asapati was a patron of Raidhu.

=== Kirtisimha (1459-1479) ===
In 1451, the Lodi dynasty took over the Delhi Sultanate. Initially, Bahlul Lodi maintained friendly relations with Gwalior, because it was not easy for him to subjugate, and because Gwalior served as a buffer state between Delhi and Malwa. However, in 1466, the Gwalior ruler Kirtisimha supported the Jaunpur ruler Hussain Shah Sharqi in a war against Delhi. The Gwalior ruler not only provided men and money to Hussain Shah, but also escorted him to Kalpi during his march to Delhi. This made Bahul Lodi an enemy of Gwalior. He defeated Hussain Sharqi in 1479, but waited until the death of Kirtisimha's successor Kalyanamalla in 1486 to attack Gwalior.

=== Kalyanmal or Kalyanmalla (1479-1486) ===
Kalyanmal, set on thrown after his father death. His reign was peaceful and Gwalior has peaceful terms throughout his reign with the Delhi sultanate. He has commissioned and built Karn Mahal in Gwalior Fort, not much has been documented on him by the then political scholars.

=== Manasimha (Man Singh Tomar) (1486-1516) ===
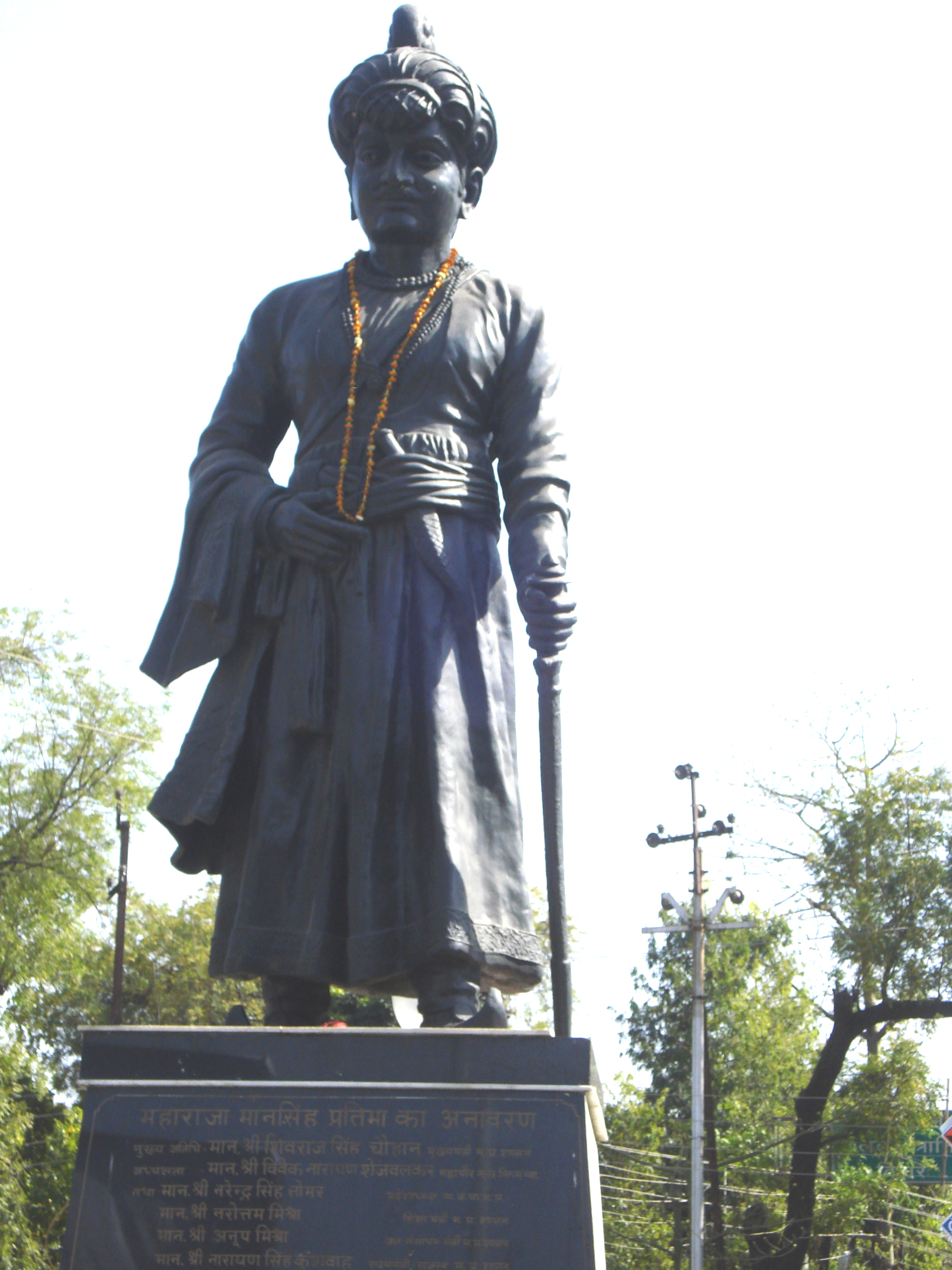
Man Singh Tomar (r.1486–1516), ruler of the Tomaras of Gwalior.

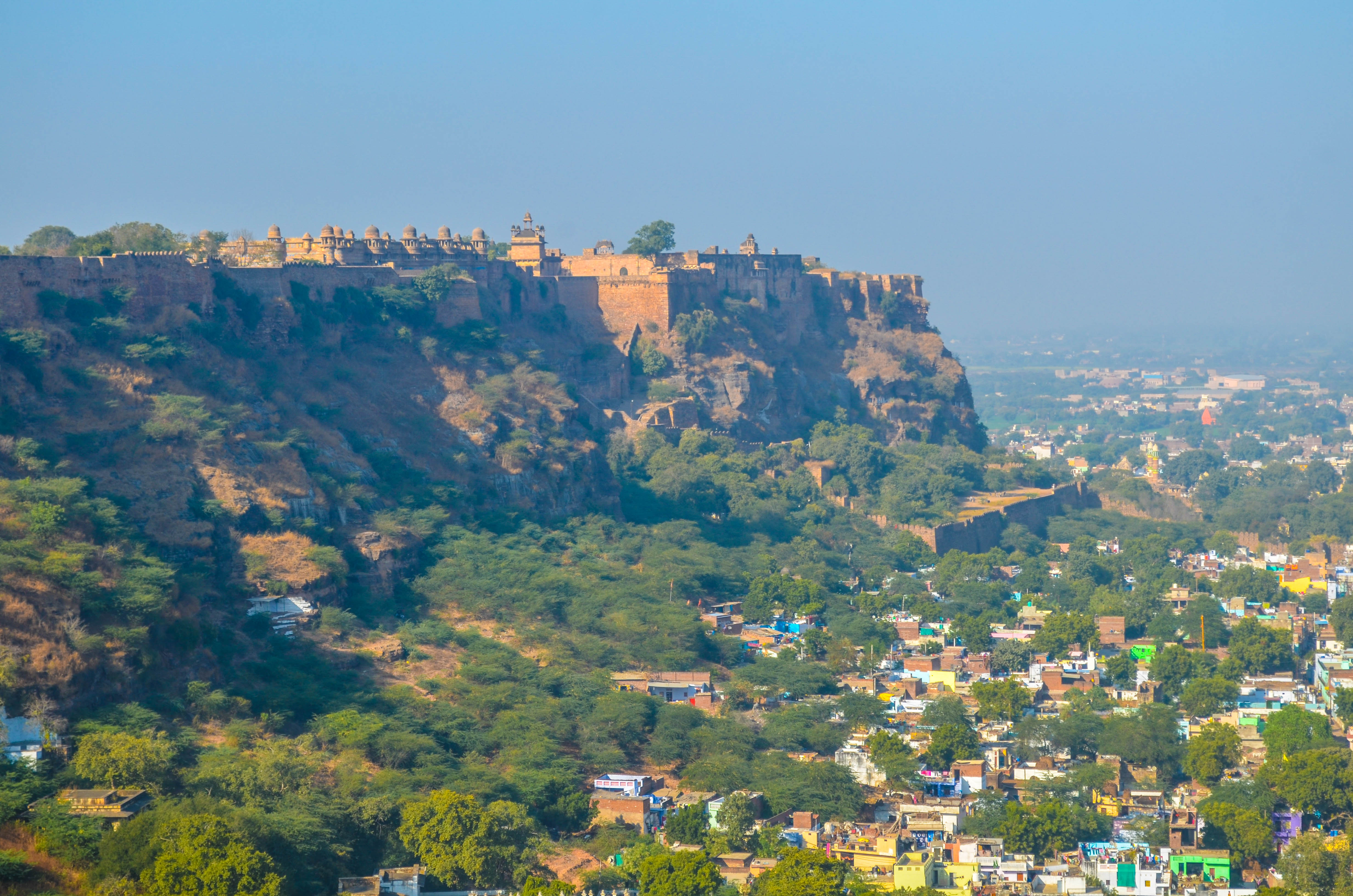
The Gwalior fort from afar

The newly crowned Manasimha (better known as Man Singh Tomar in Muslim chronicles and vernacular literature) was not prepared for an invasion from Delhi, and decided to avoid a war by paying Bahlul Lodi a tribute of 800,000 tankas (coins). In 1489, Sikandar Lodi succeeded Bahlul Lodi as the Sultan of Delhi. In 1500, Manasimha provided asylum to some rebels from Delhi, who had been involved in a plot to overthrow Sikander Lodi. The Sultan, wanting to punish Manasimha, and to expand his territory, launched a punitive expedition against Gwalior. In 1501, he captured Dholpur, a dependency of Gwalior, whose ruler Vinayaka-deva fled to Gwalior.

Sikander Lodi then marched towards Gwalior, but after crossing the Chambal River, an epidemic outbreak in his camp forced him to halt his march. Manasimha used this opportunity to reconcile with Lodi, and sent his son Vikramaditya to the Lodi camp with gifts for the Sultan. He promised to expel the rebels from Delhi, on the condition that Dholpur be restored to Vinayaka-deva. Sikander Lodi agreed to these terms, and left. Historian Kishori Saran Lal theorizes that Vinayaka Deva hadn't lost Dholpur at all: this narrative was created by the Delhi chroniclers to flatter the Sultan.

In 1504, Sikander Lodi resumed his war against the Tomaras. First, he captured the Mandrayal fort, located to the east of Gwalior. He ransacked the area around Mandrayal, but many of his soldiers lost their lives in a subsequent epidemic outbreak, forcing him to return to Delhi. Sometime later, Lodi moved his base to the newly established city of Agra, which was located closer to Gwalior. He captured Dholpur, and then marched against Gwalior, characterizing the expedition as a jihad. From September 1505 to May 1506, Lodi managed to ransack the rural areas around Gwalior, but was unable to capture the Gwalior fort because of Manasimha's hit-and-run tactics. A scarcity of food resulting from Lodi's destruction of crops forced Lodi to give up the siege. During his return to Agra, Manasimha ambushed his army near Jatwar, inflicting heavy casualties on the invaders.

Having failed in capturing the Gwalior fort, Lodi decided to capture the smaller forts surrounding Gwalior. Dholpur and Mandrayal were already in his control by this time. In February 1507, he captured the Uditnagar (Utgir or Avantgarh) fort lying on the Narwar-Gwalior route. In September 1507, he marched against Narwar, whose ruler (a member of the Tomara clan) fluctuated his allegiance between the Tomaras of Gwalior and the Malwa Sultanate. He captured the fort after a year-long siege. In December 1508, Lodi placed Narwar in charge of Raj Singh Kachchwaha, and marched to Lahar (Lahayer) located to the south-east of Gwalior. He stayed at Lahar for a few months, during which he cleared its neighbourhood of rebels. Over the next few years, Lodi remained busy in other conflicts. In 1516, he made a plan to capture Gwalior, but an illness prevented him from doing so. Manasimha died in July 1516, and Sikander Lodi's illness also led to his death in November 1517.

=== Vikramsimha (Vikramaditya) (1516-1523) ===
In Gwalior, Manasimha was succeeded by his son Vikramaditya. Meanwhile, Sikander Lodi's successor Ibrahim Lodi had to fight with rebels, one of whom - Jalal Khan - took asylum in Gwalior. Ibrahim Khan sent a strong army to besiege Gwalior. Led by Azam Humayun Sarwani, this army comprised 30,000 cavalry and 300 elephants. During the siege, Jalal Khan left for Malwa so as not to cause any further trouble to his host. After offering some initial resistance, Vikramaditya realized that he was facing a certain defeat, and started peace negotiations. As part of a peace treaty, Ibrahim Lodi forced him to surrender Gwalior Fort, and assigned the fief of Shamsabad to him. Vikramaditya remained loyal to Ibrahim Lodi for the rest of his life, and died fighting beside him at the First Battle of Panipat against Babur.

== Descendants ==
=== Ram Shah (1526-1576) ===
At the time of Vikramaditya's death, his son Ram Shah (also known as Ram Singh or Rama-sahi) was a young boy. The Tomaras, led by his relative Dhurmangad (also called Dharmanakat, Mangal Deo, or Mangat Rai) started harassing Tatar Khan, the Lodi-appointed governor of Gwalior and declared Ramshah as the Maharaja of Gwalior. Meanwhile, the Mughal ruler Babur reached Agra, and Tatar Khan decided to accept his suzerainty. However, when Babur's general Rahimdad arrived at Gwalior, Tatar Khan changed his mind. Nevertheless, Rahimdad took control of Gwalior, and subsequently, foiled Dhurmangad's attempt to capture the fort. In 1542, Sher Shah Suri captured the fort, and Ram Shah became his ally.

After the death of Sher Shah's son Islam Shah Suri in 1554, the fort was controlled by the Suri-appointed governor Bhil Khan (also known as Bahval, Bahbal, Buhail, or Suhail Khan). In 1556, Bhil Khan, facing a Mughal invasion, decided to sell the fort to Ram Shah. However, Ram Shah was defeated by the Mughal emperor Akbar's general Qiya Khan (or Kiya Khan). Akbar asked him to surrender but Ramshah did not accept the suzeranity of Mughals as the head of the state. After realizing this Akbar ousted Ramshah and his sons from Gwalior.

According to Firishta, Ram Shah's son Shalivahan was married to a Sisodia princess of Mewar. Therefore, after his defeat, Ram Shah took refuge with the Mewar ruler Maharana Pratap. Ram Shah his three sons and a grandson were killed fighting for Pratap at the Battle of Haldighati 1576.

=== Shalivahan's descendants ===
A 1631 (1688 VS) Sanskrit inscription found at the Rohtas Fort (in present-day Bihar) mentions Viramitra, a Tomara prince of Gopachala (modern Gwalior). The inscription provides a genealogy of the Tomaras, according to which Shalivahan had two sons: Shyam Shah (also Syam Shah or Syama-sahi) and Viramitra (also called Vira-mitrasena, Mitrasena or Mitra Singh). While other sources also mention a third son named Rao Dharmagat.

The inscription claims that Viramitra captured the fort from "Sera Shanam", and boasts that this unprecedented conquest astounded the emperor of Delhi. Archaeologist Hamid Kuraishi, who identified "Sera Shanam" as Sher Shah Suri, doubted the authenticity of this inscription. However, Devendrakumar Rajaram Patil theorized that this "Sera Shanam" was a local officer called Sher Khan, and Viramitra may have captured this fort as a subordinate of the Mughal emperor Shah Jahan. In any case, Viramitra did not hold this fort for long: another inscription suggests that the fort was under the command of Ikhlas Khan six years later.

According to the Gwalior State Gazetteer, both Shyam Shah and Viramitra served in Akbar's armies. Viramitra's fate is unknown, but the descendants of Shyam Shah were zamindars. Shyam Shah's son Sangram Shah assumed the nominal title of Raja of Gwalior around 1670. Sangram's grandsons Bijai Singh and Hari Singh took refuge in Udaipur. Bijay Singh died childless, but Hari Singh's descendants continued to live in Udaipur.

== List of rulers ==
The Tomara rulers of Gwalior include the following.

Name in dynasty's inscriptions (IAST)	Reign	Names in Muslim chronicles and vernacular literature
Vīrasiṃha-deva	c. 1375–1400 (c. 1394–1400 in Gwalior)	Virsingh Dev, Bir Singh Tomar, Bar Singh (in Yahya's writings), Har Singh (in Badauni's writings), Nar Singh (in Firishta's and Nizamuddin's writings).
Uddharaṇa-deva	c. 1400–1402	Uddharan Dev, Usaran or Adharan (in Khadagrai's writings)
Virāma-deva	c. 1402–1423	Viram Dev, Biram Deo (in Yahya's writings), Baram Deo (in Firishta's writings)
Gaṇapati-deva	1423–1425	Ganpati Dev
Dungarendra-deva alias Dungara-siṃha	1425–1459	Dungar Singh, Dungar Sen
Kirtisiṃha-deva	1459–1479	Kirti Singh Tomar
Kalyāṇamalla	1479–1486	Kalyanmal, Kalyan Singh
Māna-siṃha	1486–1516	Mana Sahi, Man Singh
Vikramāditya	1516–1523	Vikram Sahi, Vikramjit
