= Man Singh Tomar =

Maharaja of Gwalior from 1486 to 1516

- Maharaja
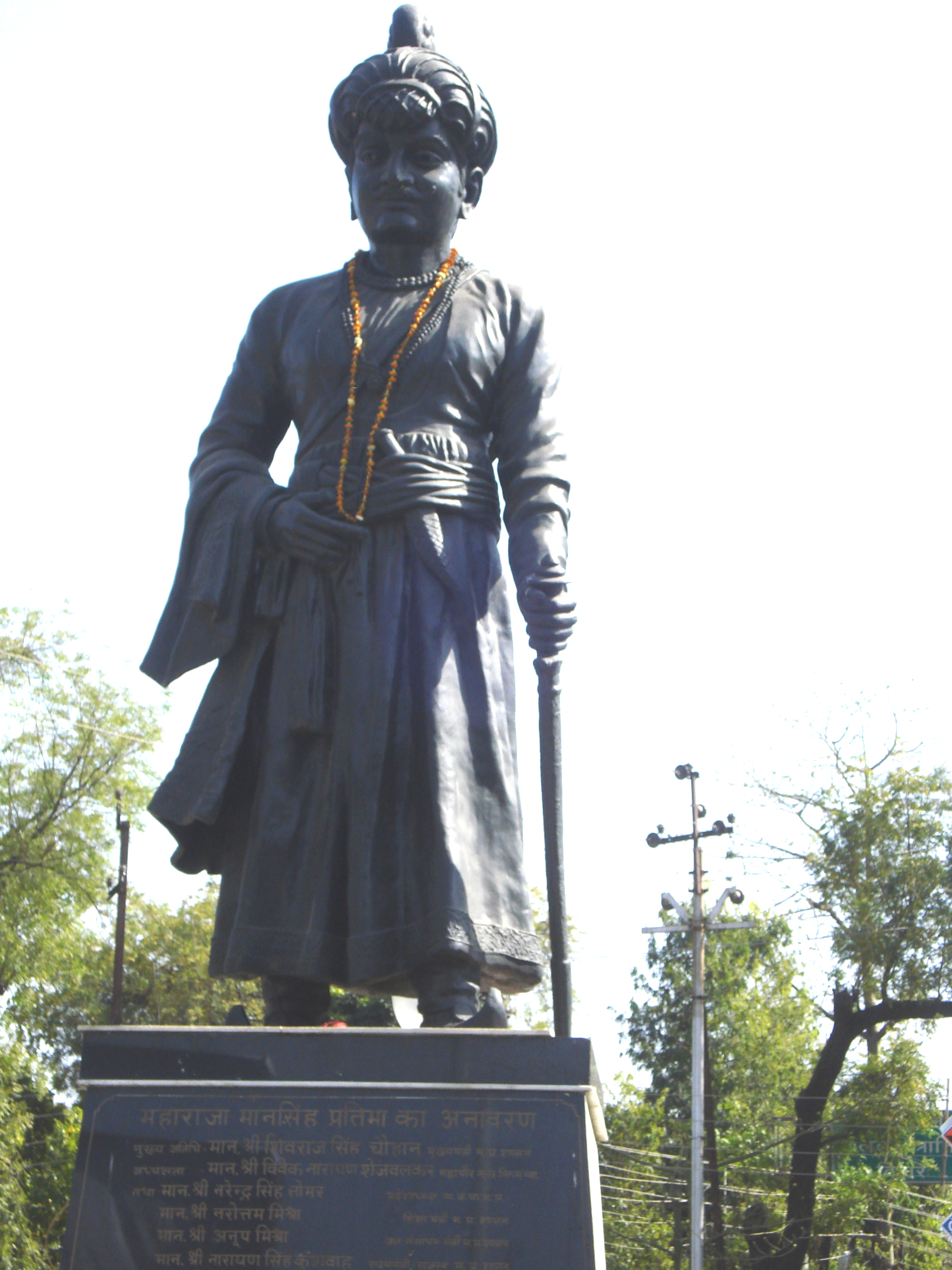

Maharaja of Gwalior
- Reign: 1486–1516
- Predecessor: Kalyanmal Tomar
- Successor: Vikramaditya Tomar
- Born: 1443; Gwalior
- Died: 1516 (aged 73); Gwalior
- Spouse: Queen Mrignayani and 8 others
- Issue: Vikramaditya Tomar and many others
- House: Tomar/Tanwar dynasty
- Father: Raja Kalyanmal Tomar
- Religion: Hinduism

Man Singh Tomar (IAST: Mānasiṃha; reigned 1486–1516) was a Tomar ruler of Gwalior from 1486 until his death in 1516.

== Biography ==
Maharaja Man Singh Tomar was born to Raja Kalyanmall, the Tomar Rajput ruler of Gwalior. He ruled for over 30 years. In his years the Tomar sometimes feuded with and were sometimes allies with the sultans of Delhi.

Amongst other women, he married a Gurjar called Mrignayani. Tomar built Gujari Mahal as a palace for her, as a monument of love for Mrignayani.

Tomar was a great patron of music. One of the fine music gems of his court was the Hindustani classical musician Tansen. Other notable musicians and singers includes: Jaggannath kavirai, Gopala, Swami Haridasa, Baiju, Mohamud Lohang, Bakshu, Bhagwant, Dhaundhi and Ramdas. He invented and sang Dhurpad and complied it in his book named Manakautuhal, he was patron of Dhrupad genre from Hindustani Classical Music.

=== Conflict with Sikandar Lodi ===
The newly crowned Man Singh Tomar was not prepared for an invasion from Delhi, and decided to avoid a war by paying Bahlul Lodi a tribute of 800,000 tankas (coins). In 1489, Sikandar Lodi succeeded Bahlul Lodi as the Sultan of Delhi. In 1500, Man Singh provided asylum to some rebels from Delhi, and who had been involved in a plot to overthrow Sikander Lodi. The Sultan, wanting to punish Man Singh, and to expand his territory, launched a punitive expedition against Gwalior. In 1501, he captured Dholpur, a dependency of Gwalior, whose ruler Vinayaka-Deva fled to Gwalior.

Sikander Lodi then marched towards Gwalior, but after crossing the Chambal River, and an epidemic outbreak in his camp forced him to halt his march. Man Singh used this opportunity to reconcile with Lodi, and sent his son Vikramaditya to the Lodi camp with gifts for the Sultan. He promised to expel the rebels from Delhi, on the condition that Dholpur be restored to Vinayaka-deva. Sikander Lodi agreed to these terms, and left. Historian Kishori Saran Lal theorizes that Vinayaka Deva hadn't lost Dholpur at all: this narrative was created by the Delhi chroniclers to flatter the Sultan.

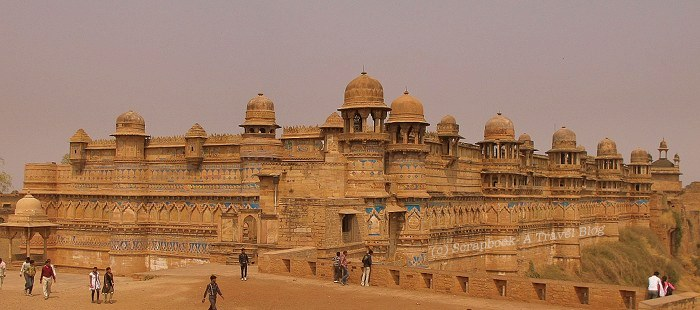
The "Man Mandir" palace at Gwalior Fort was built by Man Singh Tomar between 1486 and 1517.

In 1504, Sikander Lodi resumed his war against the Tomaras. First, he captured the Mandrayal fort, located to the east of Gwalior. He ransacked the area around Mandrayal, but many of his soldiers lost their lives in a subsequent epidemic outbreak, forcing him to return to Delhi. Sometime later, Lodi moved his base to the newly established city of Agra, which was located closer to Gwalior. He captured Dholpur, and then marched against Gwalior, characterizing the expedition as a jihad. From September 1505 to May 1506, Lodi managed to ransack the rural areas around Gwalior, but was unable to capture the Gwalior Fort because of Man Singhs's hit-and-run tactics. A scarcity of food resulting from Lodi's destruction of crops forced Lodi to give up the siege. During his return to Agra, Man Singh ambushed his army near Jatwar, inflicting heavy casualties on the invaders.

Having failed in capturing the Gwalior Fort, Lodi decided to capture the smaller forts surrounding Gwalior. Dholpur and Mandrayal were already in his control by this time. In February 1507, he captured the Uditnagar (Utgir or Avantgarh) fort lying on the Narwar-Gwalior route. In September 1507, he marched against Narwar, whose ruler (a member of the Tomara clan) fluctuated his allegiance between the Tomaras of Gwalior and the Malwa Sultanate. He captured the fort after a year-long siege. In December 1508, Lodi placed Narwar in charge of Raj Singh Kachchwaha, and marched to Lahar (Lahayer) located to the south-east of Gwalior. He stayed at Lahar for a few months, during which he cleared its neighbourhood of rebels. Over the next few years, Lodi remained busy in other conflicts. In 1516, he made a plan to capture Gwalior, but an illness prevented him from doing so. Man Singh died in 1516, and Sikander Lodi's illness also led to his death in November 1517.

== Palaces ==
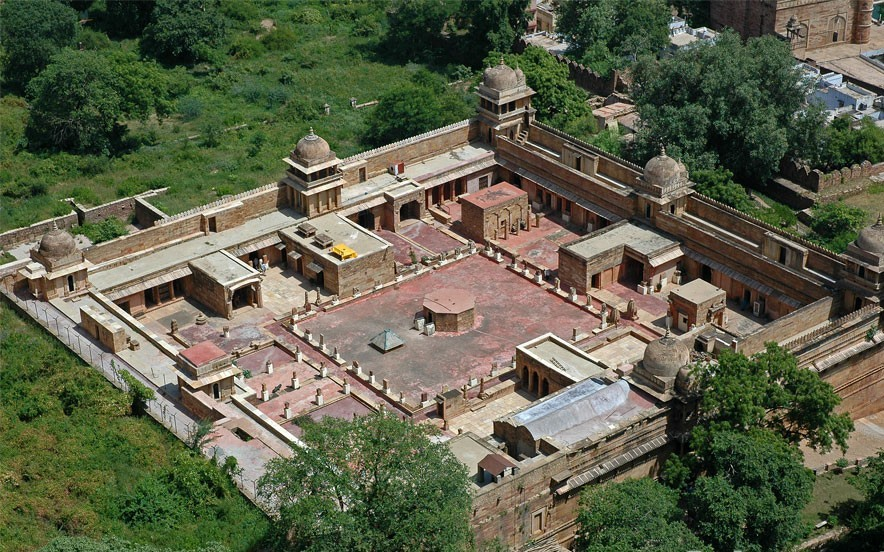
The Gujari Mahal at Gwalior Fort was built by Man Singh Tomar.

The 15th century Gujari Mahal is a monument of love by Raja Man Singh Tomar for his queen, Mrignayani. Due to the friction between Mrignayani and his other wives as Mrignayani was of lower caste, Raja Man Singh built the separate palace for her below the Gwalior fortress. Mrignayani demanded a separate palace with a constant water supply from the River Rai, she demanded to be always with the king in war. The outer structure of the Gujari Mahal has survived in an almost total state of preservation, the interior has been now converted into an archaeological museum.

Within Gwalior Fort, also built by Man Singh Tomar, is the Man Mandir Palace, built between 1486 CE and 1517 CE. The tiles that once adorned its exterior have not survived, but at the entrance, traces of these still remain. Vast chambers with fine stone screens were once the music halls, and behind these screens, the royal ladies would learn music from the great masters of those times.
