= Vatika =

Vatika may refer to

- Ashok Vatika, a garden in Lanka in Hindu mythology
- Hanuman Vatika, a garden in Rourkela, India
- Shatavar Vatika Herbal Park, Hisar in India
- Shyam Vatika, a mural in Gwalior, India
- Vatika High School for Deaf & Dumb in Chandigarh, India
- Rajdhani Vatika, an alternative name for Eco Park, Patna in Bihar, India
- Vatika, an alternative name for Voies, a former municipality in Greece
- Vatika Business Centre, a Serviced Office Spaces provider in India
