= Suraj Sen =

Suraj Sen (later known as Suraj Pal) was a legendary petty noble who founded the fortress and city of Gwalior. Legendary accounts differ as to the claimed timeframe, from 375 AD to 700 AD.

Per legend, Suraj was a leper who was healed by the hermit-saint Gwalipa after bringing water from a stream to the hermit. The saint blessed Suraj, commanding him to take the last name Pal, to build up the banks of the stream (creating the still-extant Suraj Kund lake), and to found a fortress. Suraj named the fortress Gwalior in honor of the hermit.
