= Maharaj Bada, Gwalior =

Maharaja Bada Most Beautiful Square of South Asia
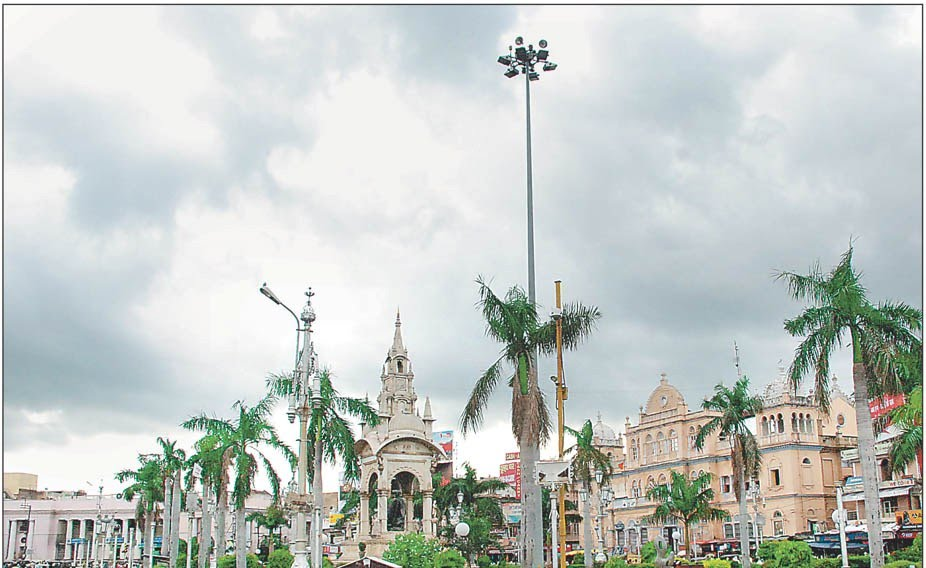
- Interactive map of Maharaja Bada
- Coordinates: 26.199411°N 78.148670°E
- Country: India
- State: Madhya Pradesh
- District: Gwalior
- Elevation: 103 m (338 ft)

Languages
  - Official: Hindi, Marathi, English, Bundeli
- Time zone: UTC+5:30 (IST)

Maharaj Bada or Maharaja Square is one of the most significant and lively places of Gwalior, Madhya Pradesh, India. It is known as the most beautiful square in Asia consisting of six different architectural halls namely: the Victoria Hall, the Town Hall, the Gwalior State Minting Hall, the American Hall, the Saudi Hall and the Opera Hall. Maharaj Bada, which is locally called as Bada, is the central focus of Lashkar subcity of Gwalior, with a large square known as Jayaji Square all these buildings are now have been taken by the State Government in its services. Maharaj Bada also has Gorkhi School, Gorkhi Mandir, Topi Bazaar, Subhash Market and Nazar Bagh Market.

== Location ==
Thriving bazaars surround the chowk. There are several jewelry shops situated near Maharaj bada. It is one of the prime or important markets of Gwalior, as well as Madhya Pradesh. There are several significant and big markets located at or near Maharaj Bada, some of those are Sarafa Bazaar, Topi Bazaar, Subhash Market named after Subhash Chandra Bose, Nazarbagh Market, Gandhi Market, Daulat Ganj etc. Apart from these big markets, there are several small markets around the Maharaj Bada area. Victoria Market, an old major stationery, books and garments market, located at Bada, caught fire in June 2010, which also collapsed one portion of the historical Market building. There is a beautiful garden at large chowk, having statue of Maharaj Jiyaji Rao, in the centre of it.

== Transport ==
Maharaj Bada is the centre of the Lashkar area of the city, which holds good portion of city's economy. It is the start and end point of several local transport routes, some of them are-

1. Maharaj Bada to Morar via Shinde Ki Chawni, Phoolbagh, Padav, Gwalior railway station, Thatipur via 8 no. Route.
2. Maharaj Bada to Hazira via Shinde Ki Chawni, Phoolbagh.
3. Maharaj Bada is about 6 km from Gwalior railway station.
