= Gwalior =

- Metropolis
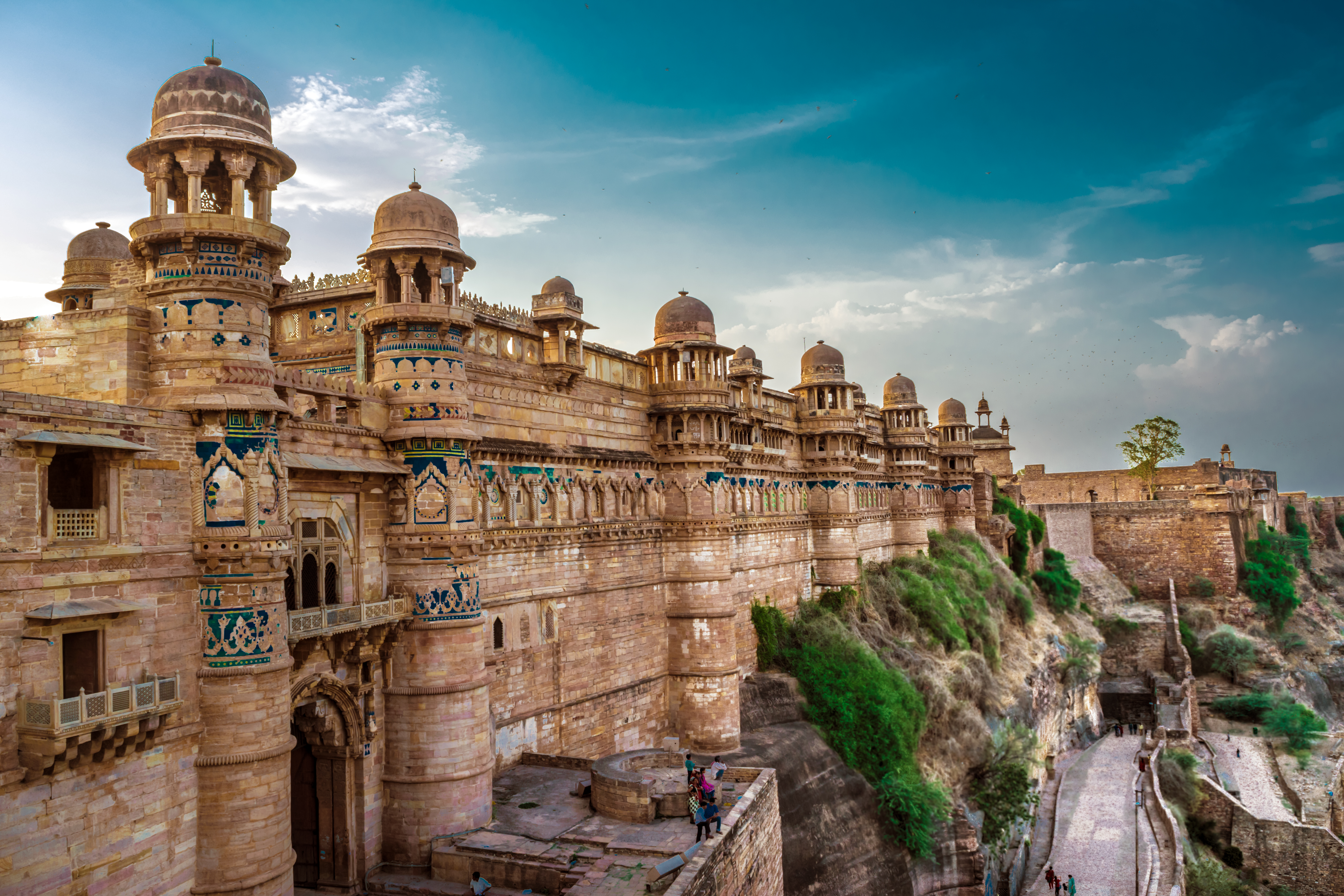
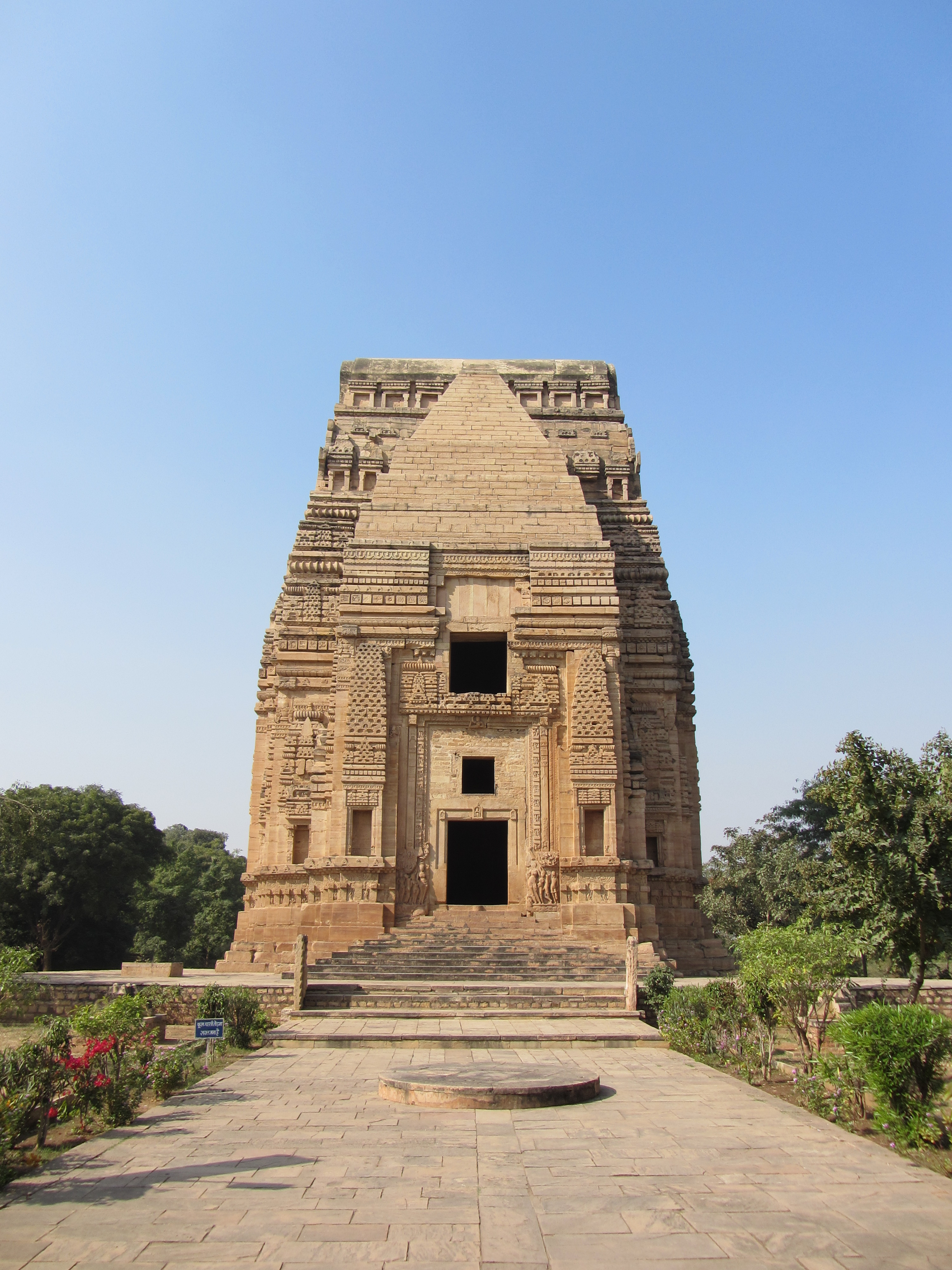
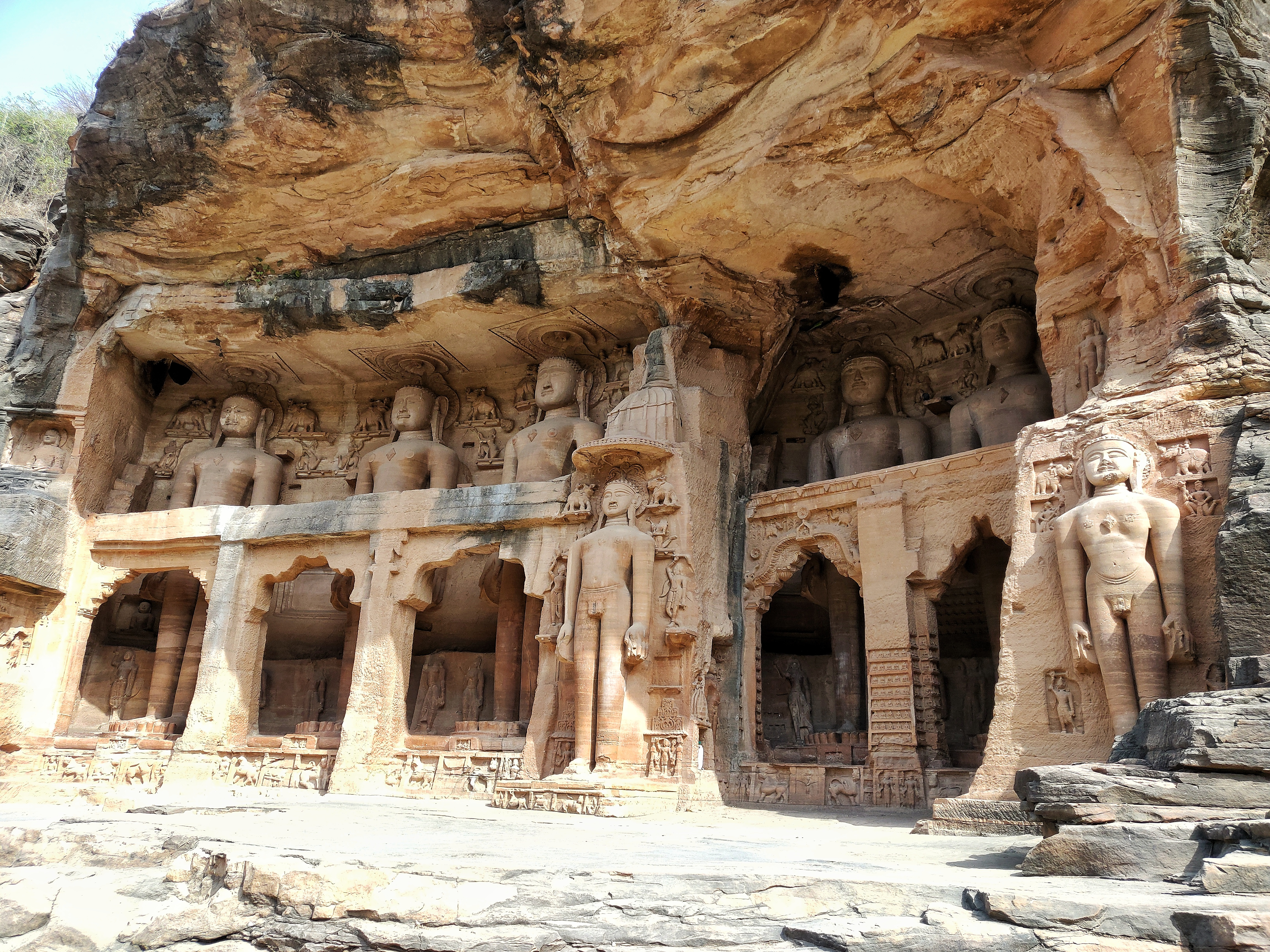
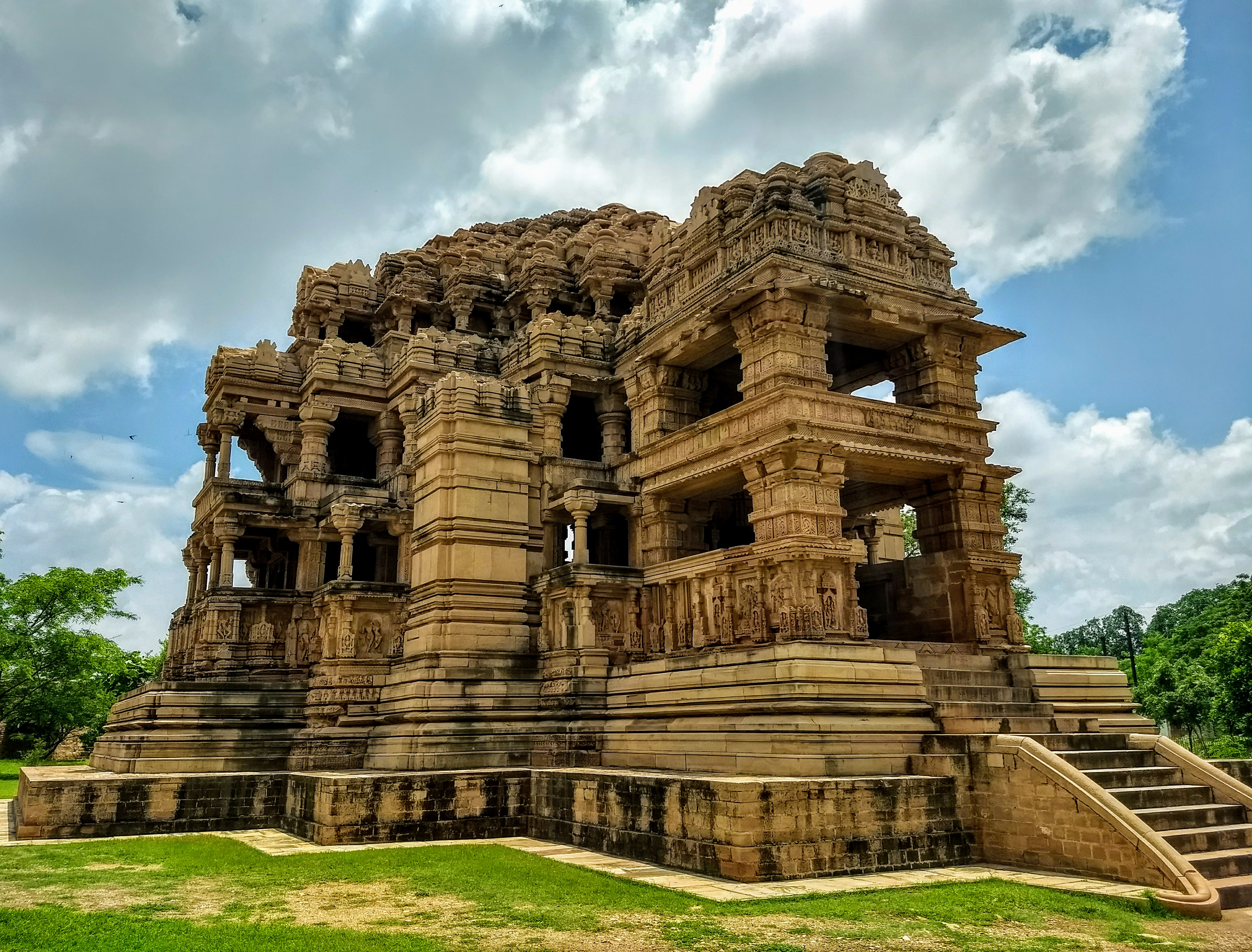
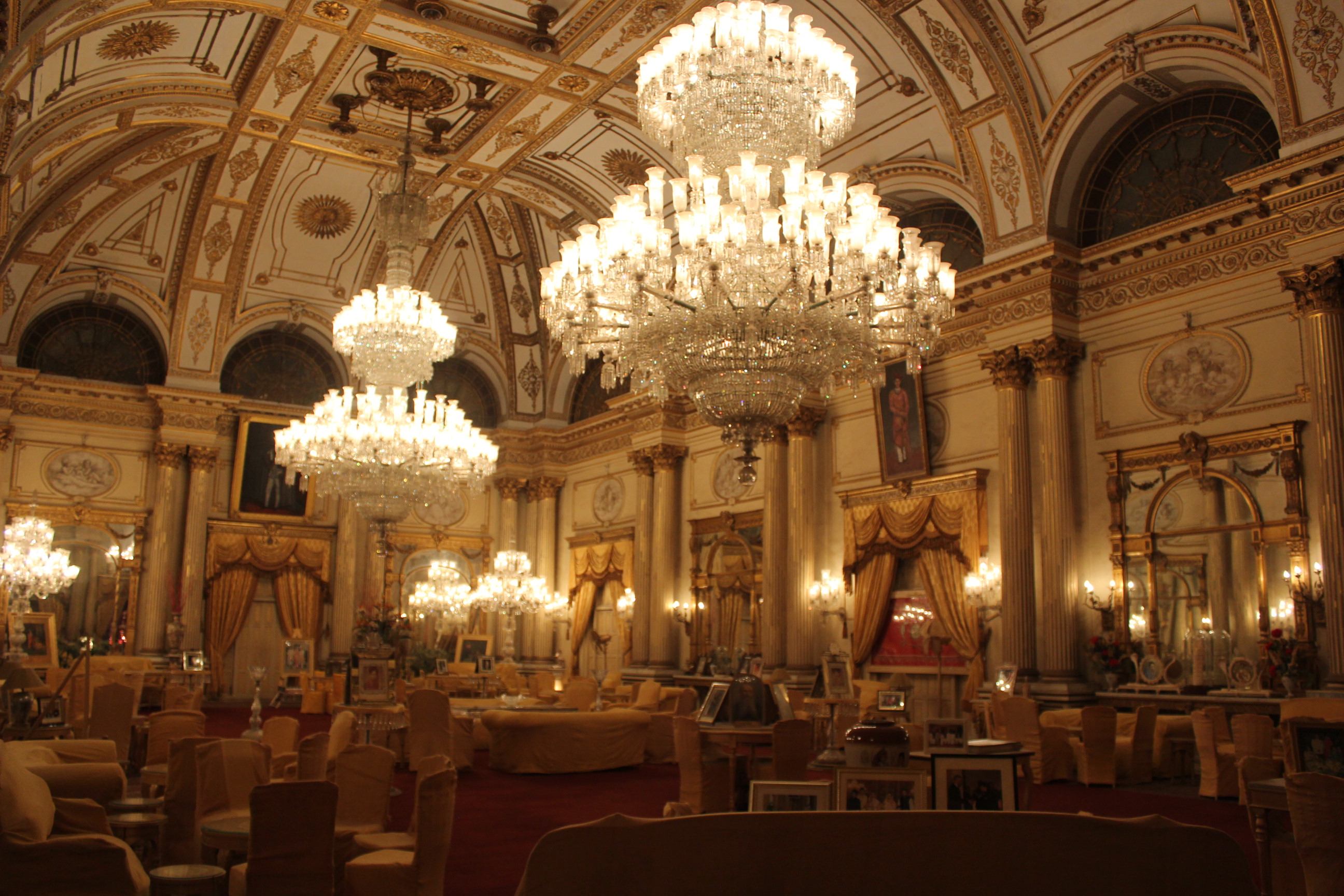
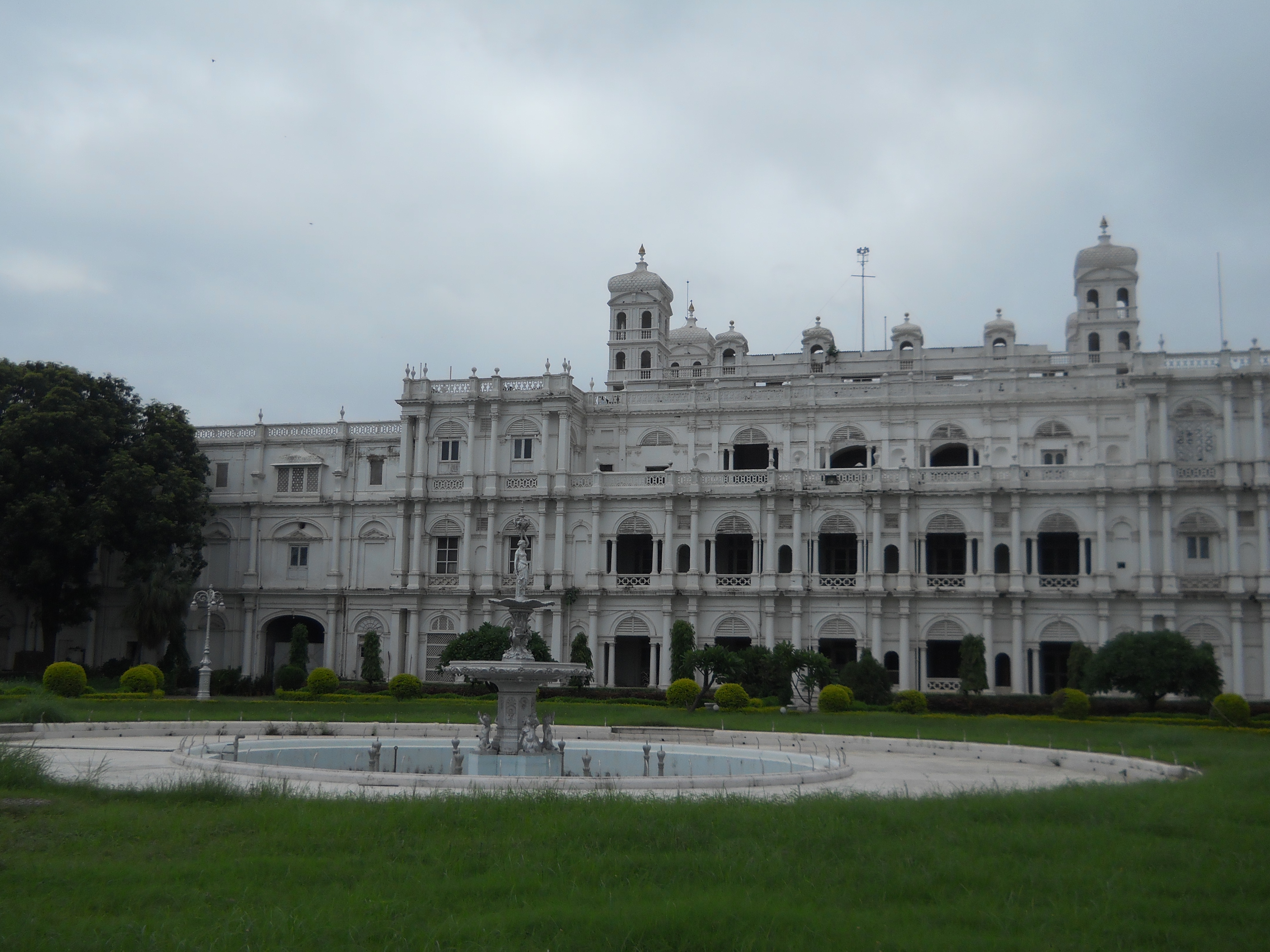
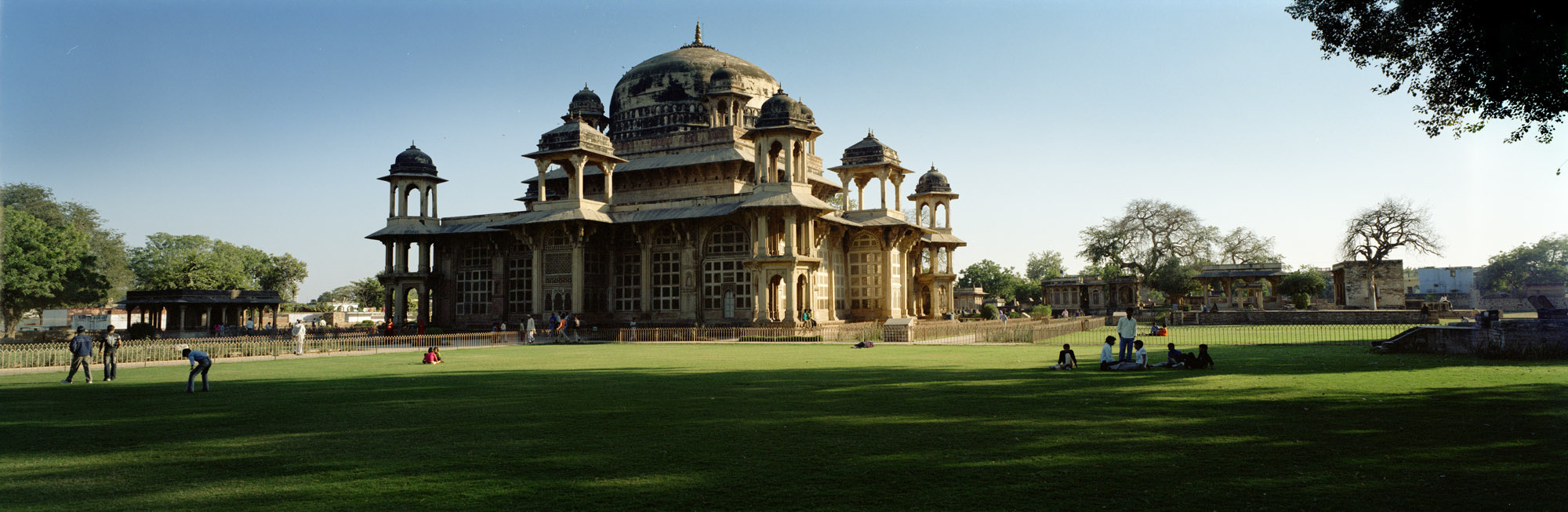
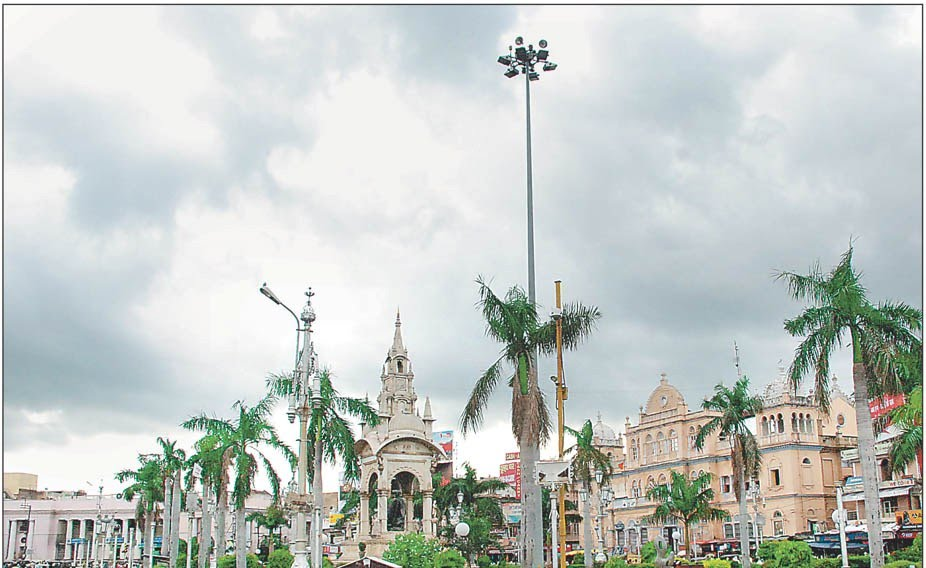
- Gwalior Fort Teli ka Mandir Siddhachal Caves Sasbahu Temple Durbar Hall Jai Vilas Mahal Tomb of Mohammad Ghaus and Tansen Maharaj Bada Shopping District

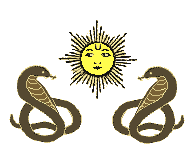
- Coat of arms
- Nicknames: The City of Music, Capital of Hindustani Music, The Royal City of Madhya Pradesh
- Location within Madhya Pradesh Location within India
- Coordinates: 26°12′45″N 78°10′39″E
- Country: India
- State: Madhya Pradesh
- Region: Gwalior Chambal
- District: Gwalior
- Founder: Suraj Sen
- Named for: Gwalipa

Government
  - Type: Municipal Corporation
  - Body: Gwalior Municipal Corporation (GMC)
  - Mayor: Shobha Sikarwar
  - Administrator: Ruchika Chauhan IAS

Area
  - Metropolis: 414 km^{2} (160 sq mi)
- Elevation: 247.04 m (810.5 ft)

Population (2011 census)
  - Metropolis: 2,032,036
  - Density: 5,478/km^{2} (14,190/sq mi)
  - Metro: 1,273,792
  - Population rank: 46th
- Demonym(s): Gwaliorites, Gwaliori

Language
  - Official: Hindi,
  - Other: Bundeli, Marathi
- Time zone: UTC+5:30 (IST)
- PIN: 474001 to 474055
- Telephone code: 0751
- Vehicle registration: MP-07
- Sex ratio: 862 ♂/♀
- Literacy: 87.14%
- Website: gwalior.nic.in

Gwalior (pronounced [ɡʋɑːlɪjəɾ]) is the fourth largest city of the Indian state of Madhya Pradesh where it serves as the capital and the administrative headquarters of the eponymous district and division. It is an important cultural, industrial, sports and political centre. Known as the music city of India, it is home to the oldest musical gharana of the Indian subcontinent and of the earliest known epigraphical inscription that uses the number 0 (zero) as part of the Hindu numeral system. The grand historic city and its fortress have been ruled by several Indian kingdoms from the Alchon Huns to the Gurjara Pratihara and Kachchhapaghata dynasties. Later it fell into the hands of the Delhi Sultanate before passing on to their vassals, the Tomars.

The Mughal Empire conquered the city and its fortress in the 16th century. Following the decline of the empire, the city fell into the hands of Jat rulers, then to the British East India Company in 1730. The Scindia Dynasty of the Maratha Empire took control of the city in the early 18th century.

Gwalior was one of the major locations of the Sepoy Mutiny. Prior to Indian independence, the Kingdom of Gwalior remained a princely state of the British Raj with the Scindia as rulers and the city became the winter capital of the Central India Agency. Gwalior was a premier twenty-one Gun Salute State along with Hyderabad, Mysore, Jammu and Kashmir and Baroda.

Post Independence, the city became the capital of the short-lived state of Madhya Bharat, now part of the larger state of Madhya Pradesh. Located in its northern part, it is one of the counter-magnet cities hosting many administrative offices of the Chambal division including the state and national headquarters of several organisations, commissions and boards and is surrounded by industrial and commercial zones of neighbouring districts, Malanpur, Bhind, Banmore, Morena.

Gwalior occupies a strategic location in the historical Gird region. Surrounded by high rocky hills, the city is situated in the valley in the Ganga-Yamuna Drainage Basin. The city's metropolitan area includes Lashkar, Old City (Fort City), Gwalior West, Gwalior East, Greater Gwalior, and Morar Cantonment.

Gwalior is one of the cities selected under the central government's flagship Smart Cities Mission and startup centre programmes.

One of UNESCO's cities of Music as part of the world creative cities network, Gwalior's identity is strongly associated with its rich musical, artistic traditions and vibrant culture, making it one of India's most touristic cities.

== Etymology and History ==
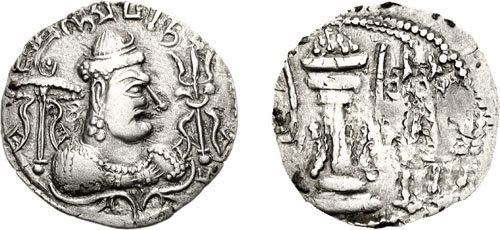
Coin of the Alchon Huns king Mihirakula, who ruled in Gwalior circa 520 CE.

Gwalior derived its name from the Gwalior Fort itself, which was earlier known as Gopgiri, Gop Parvat (Shepherd's Hill) or Gopachal during Gupta period. In ancient time this region was known as Gopashetra roughly translated to "the land of Gopis" or "the land associated to Cowherds". The name is believed to have connections with the Gopis (the cow herdesses or cowherds girls) of the Lord Krishna mythology. It is said that the area was once inhabited by cowherds and associated with pastoral activities, especially in the times of Mahabharata. This may refer to the cultural or historical ties with Lord Krishna worship, which had an influence on the region. Gwalior was the major commercial and trade route during Samudragupta reign. According to some legends, Gwalior was founded in 600 CE (early 5th Century) after a local chieftain, Suraj Sen, who was cured of leprosy from a drink given to him by a hermit named Gwalipa. Suraj subsequently set up a city and fort and named them after Gwalipa.

The earliest historical record found at Gwalior is the Gwalior inscription of the Alchon Hun ruler Mihirakula. It describes Mihirakula's father Toramana (493–515) as "a ruler of the earth, of great merit, who was renowned by the name of the glorious Tôramâna; by whom, through (his) heroism that was specially characterized by truthfulness, the earth was governed with justice", and his Mihirakula as "the lord of the earth" as of 520 CE.

Around the 9th century, the Gurjara-Pratihara dynasty controlled Gwalior and during their rule, they constructed the Teli ka Mandir temple. The Kachchhapaghata dynasty ruled the area c.950 –c.1192 CE, leaving remarkable architectural works such as the Sas and Bahu Temples. In 1021, Gwalior was attacked by forces led by Mahmud Ghazni.

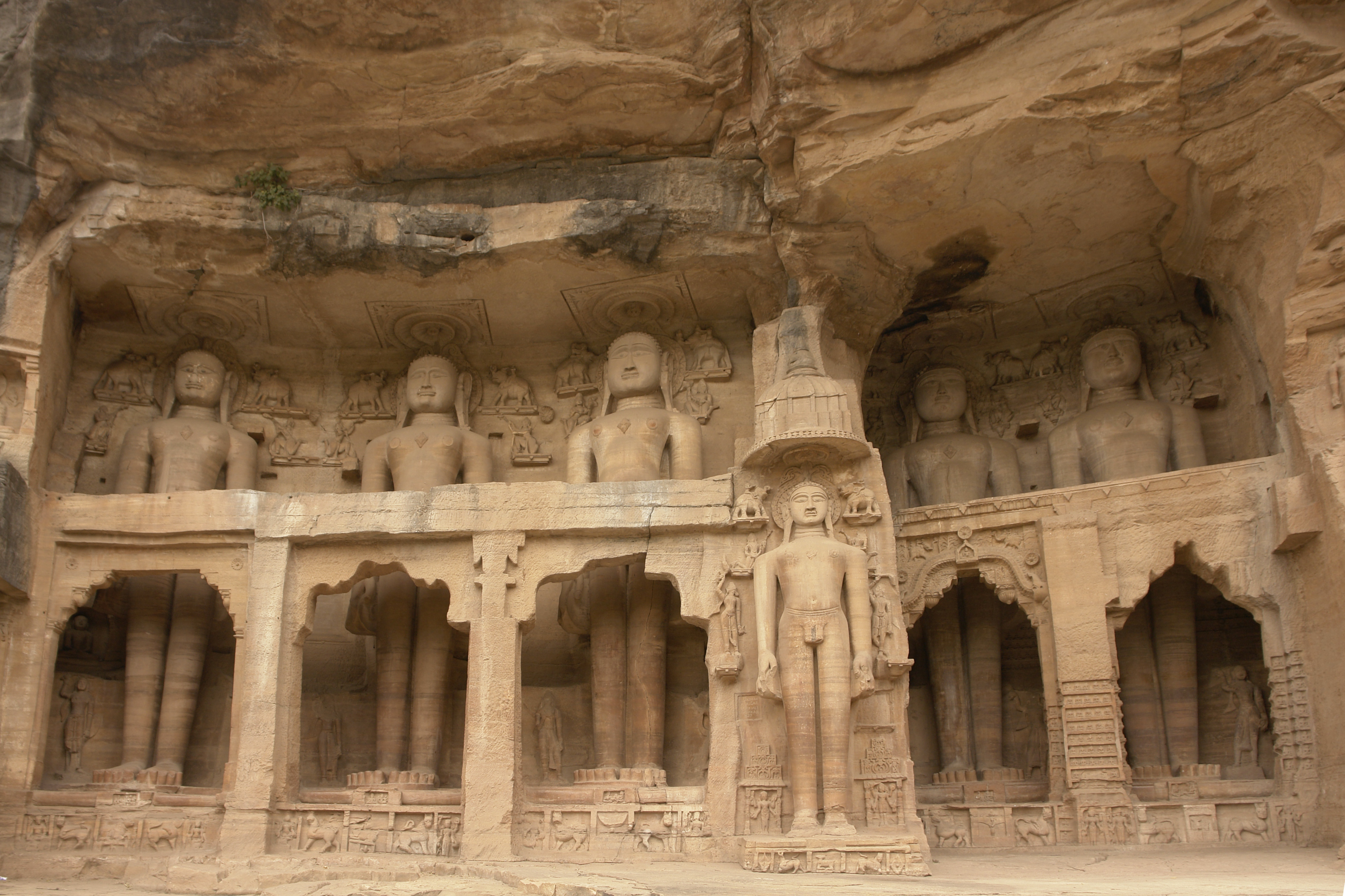
Jain Colossal at Siddhachal Caves inside Gwalior Fort.

In 1231 Iltutmish, ruler of the Mamluk dynasty of the Delhi Sultanate, captured Gwalior after an 11-month-long effort and from then till the 13th century it remained under Muslim rule. In 1375, Raja Veer Singh was made the ruler of Gwalior and he founded the rule of the Tomar clan. During those years, Gwalior saw its golden period. The Jain Sculptures at Gwalior Fort were built under Tomar rule. Man Singh Tomar a Tomar Rajput made his dream palace, the Man Mandir Palace which is now a tourist attraction at Gwalior Fort. Babur described it as "the pearl in the necklace of forts of India and not even the winds could touch its masts". The daily light and sound show organised there apprise about the history of the Gwalior Fort and Man Mandir Palace. By the 15th century, the city had a noted singing school which was attended by the prominent figure of Hindustani classical music, Tansen. After death of Mughal Emperor Aurangzeb the Jat ruler Bhim Singh Rana captured Gwalior from Mughals. Later in the 1740s, the Scindia Dynasty captured Gwalior from the Jats. It remained a princely state during the period of British rule.

Chaturbhuj Temple at Gwalior Fort has the world's very first occurrence of zero as a written number.

=== Rebellion of 1857 ===
Gwalior was major centre in the 1857 rebellion, mainly because of Rani Lakshmibai. After Kalpi (Jhansi) fell into the hands of the British on 24 May 1858, Lakshmibai sought shelter at Gwalior Fort. The Maharaja of Gwalior, was not willing to give up his fort, but after negotiations, his troops capitulated and the rebels took possession of the fort. The British swifty charged against Gwalior in no time, the battle was fought by Lakshmibai. Indian forces numbered around 20,000, and British forces around 1,600 troops. Lakshmibai's example is remembered to this day by Indian nationalists. She died fighting in Gwalior. There is a statue erected at the cenotaph (Samadhi) of Lakshmibai on her horse at Chhatri of Rani Lakshmibai in Gwalior's Phoolbagh area where she died and was cremated which commemorates her contribution to the fight for independence. Tantia Tope and Rao Sahib escaped. Tantia Tope was later captured and hanged in April 1859.

=== Princely state of Gwalior ===
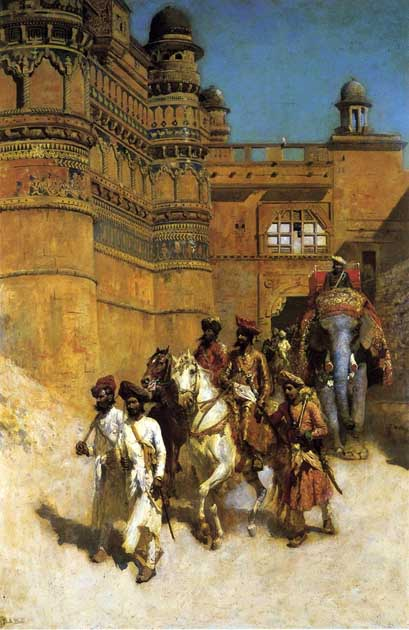
The Maharaja of Gwalior Before His Palace, by Edwin Lord Weeks. c. 1887

Scindia is a Maratha clan in India. This clan included rulers of the Gwalior State in the 18th and 19th centuries, who were a princely state during the period of British colonial rule until Indian independence. During independence, the clans became involved in politics.

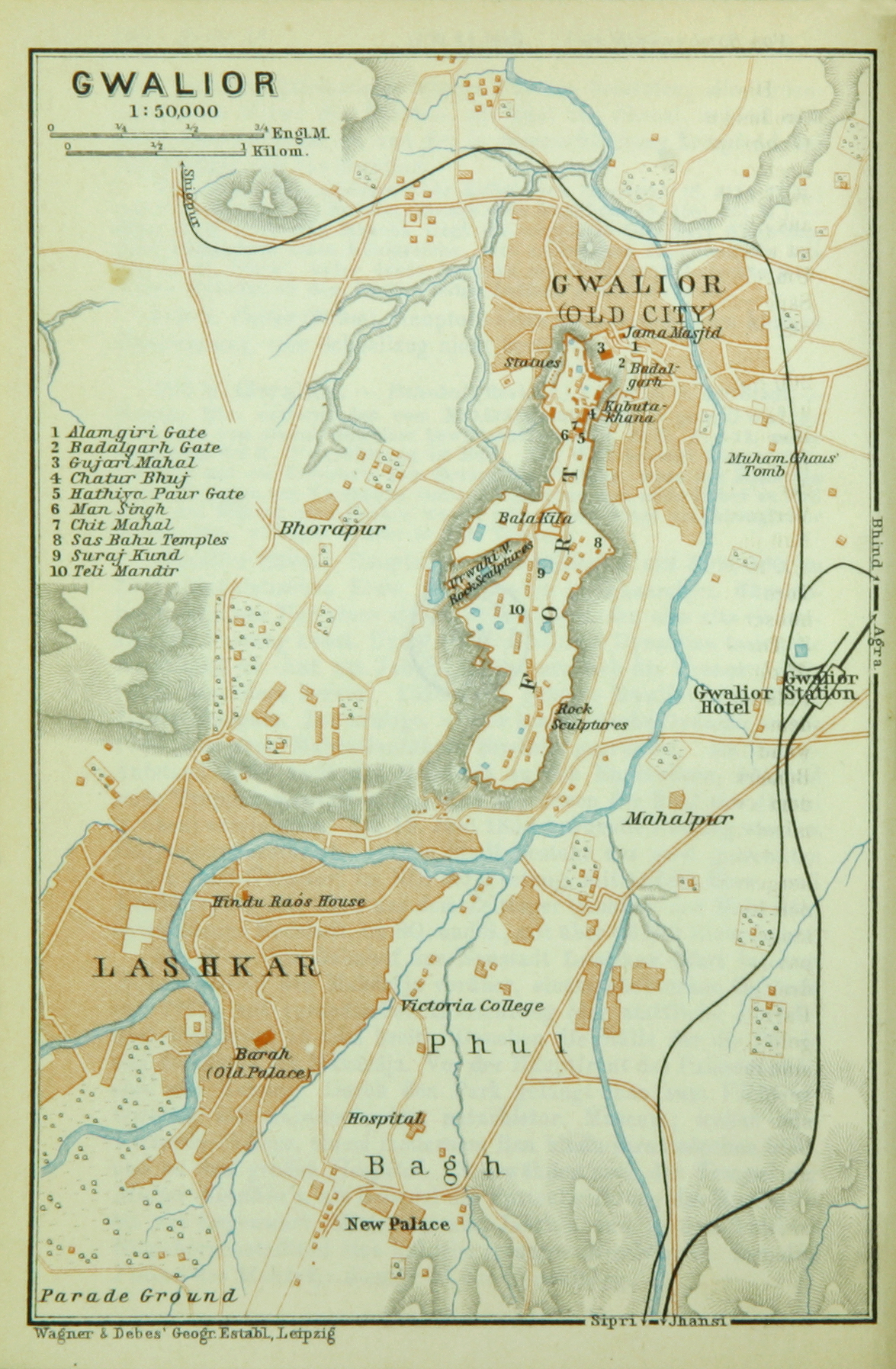
Map of the city, ca 1914

The Scindia state of Gwalior became a major regional power in the second half of the 18th century and figured prominently in the three Anglo-Maratha Wars. (Gwalior first fell to the British in 1780.) The Scindias held significant power over many of the Rajput states, and conquered the state of Ajmer. During the Indian Rebellion of 1857, the city was briefly held by rebel forces in 1858 until they were defeated by the British. The Scindia dynasty ruled Gwalior until India's independence from the United Kingdom in 1947, when the Maharaja Jiwajirao Scindia acceded to the Government of India. Gwalior was merged with a number of other princely states to become the new Indian state of Madhya Bharat. Jivajirao Scindia served as the state's Rajpramukh, or the appointed governor, from 28 May 1948 to 31 October 1956, when Madhya Bharat was merged into Madhya Pradesh. Gwalior was the first princely state that was merged into India.

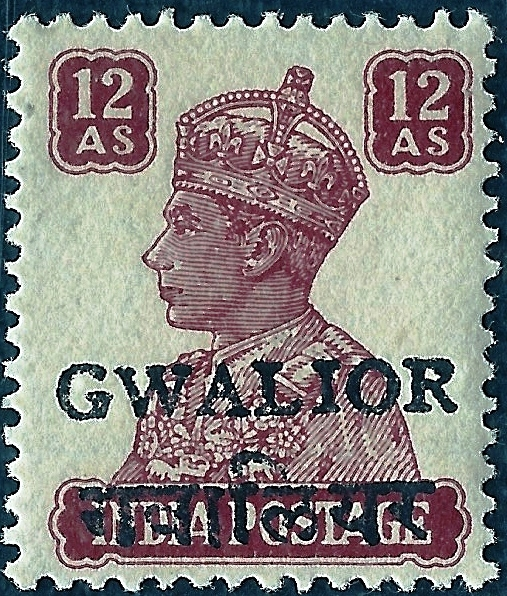
A King George VI stamp of 1949, inscribed 'GWALIOR'

In 1962, Rajmata Vijayraje Scindia, the widow of Maharaja Jivajirao Scindia, was elected to the Lok Sabha, beginning the family's career in electoral politics. She was first a member of the Congress Party, and later became an influential member of the Bharatiya Janata Party. Her son, Maharaja Madhavrao Scindia was elected to the Lok Sabha in 1971, representing the Congress Party, and served until his death in 2001. His son, Jyotiraditya Scindia, also in the Congress Party, was elected to the seat formerly held by his father in 2004, but later joined the Bharatiya Janata Party in 2020.

== Demographics ==
As of the 2011 Census of India, Gwalior had a population of 1,054,420. Males constitute 53% of the population and females 47%. Gwalior has an average literacy rate of 84.14%, higher than the national average of 74%: male literacy is 89.64% and female literacy is 77.92%. In Gwalior, about 11% of the population is under 6 years of age. The city's metropolitan population, which includes the commuter town of Morar Cantonment, was 1,102,884.

=== Religion ===
Religion in Gwalior (2011)
Religion	Percent
Hindus	88.84%
Muslim	8.58%
Jains	1.41%
Sikhism	0.56%
Other or not stated	0.61%

Hinduism is practised by the majority of the people in Gwalior (88.84%). Other religions practised include Islam (8.58%), Jainism (1.41%), Sikhism (0.56%), and Christianity (0.29). Gwalior has a long history of religious amity. The erstwhile Maharajas of the Scindia dynasty considered the Sufi saints to be their gurus and headed the Muharram procession every year.

=== Languages ===
Languages of Gwalior (2011)
1. Hindi (96.0%)
2. Sindhi (1.10%)
3. Marathi (1.04%)
4. Others (1.89%)

Hindi is the predominant language of Gwalior, with nearly 96% of residents speaking it as their first language. Sindhi and Marathi are spoken by 1% each.

== Geography ==
Gwalior is located at 26.22°N 78.18°E. in northern Madhya Pradesh 300 km (190 mi) from Delhi. It has an average elevation of 197 metres (646 feet). Most part of it comes under the Gird and Bundelkhand area.

=== Waterways ===
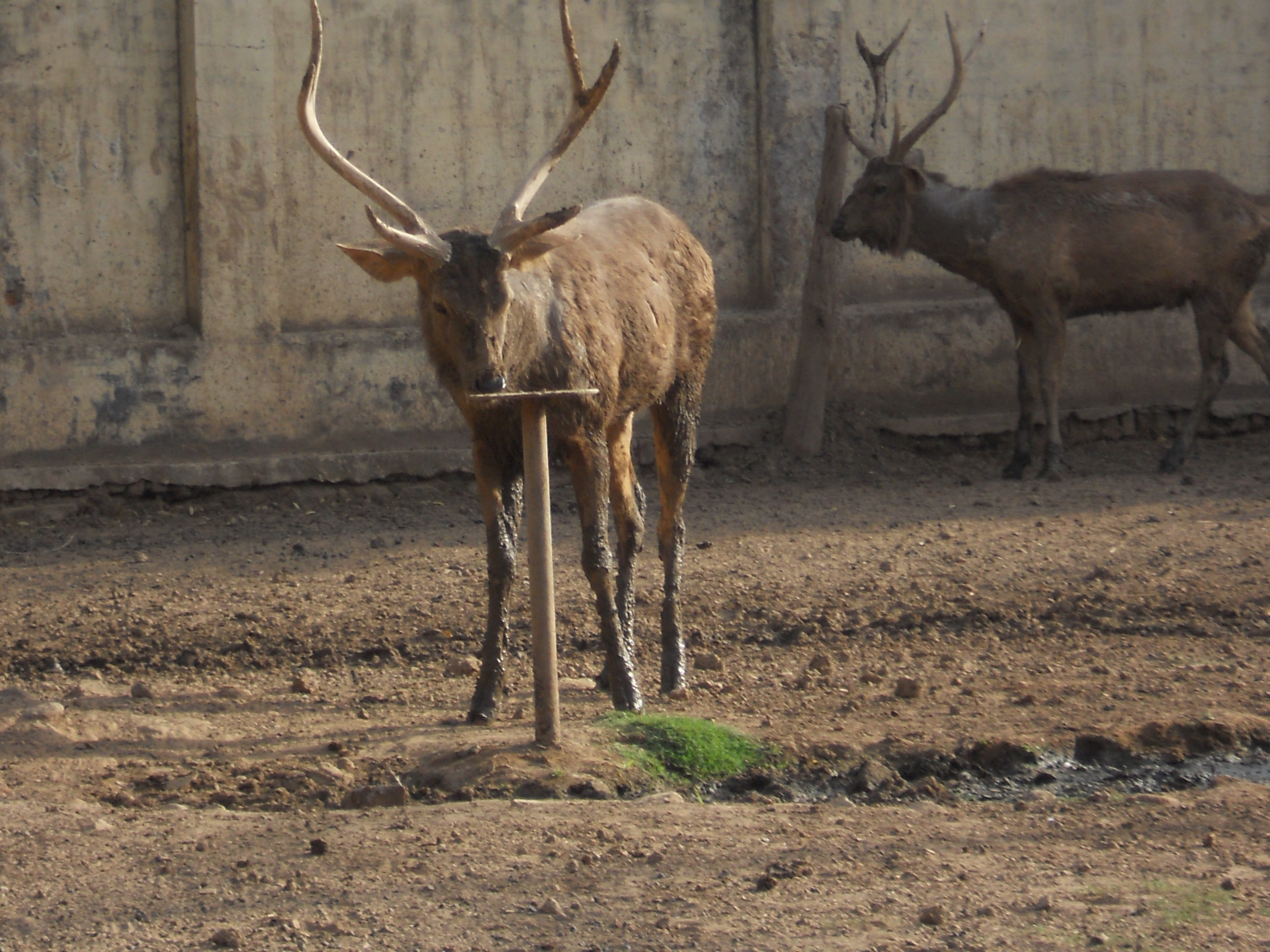
Sambhar at Gandhi Zoological Park (Gwalior zoo)

The Tigra Dam is located on the outskirts of the city. The dam is now being used to store water from the Sank river and supply water to the city. The reservoir is used for leisure activities including speed boating, paddle boating, and water scooters.

The Swarna Rekha river is a reconstructed part of the Swarna Rekha river which was dried during the British raj. Boat rides run between Padav in central Gwalior to Gwalior Zoo.

=== Parks and gardens ===
The Lashkar part of Gwalior has many parks, including the Phool Bagh, or the garden of flowers, built to welcome the Prince of Cambridge.

Italian Garden – the garden which was used by the Scindias as a place of relaxation, is Italian in architecture with a water pool surrounded by musical fountains. Ambedkar Park and Gandhi Park are other prominent parks.

Gwalior Zoo provides a home for white tigers, serpents, golden pheasants, sambar, hyena, bison, and others.

=== Climate ===
Gwalior

Climate chart (precipitation, max. and min. temperature)
J	F	M	A	M	J	J	A	S	O	N	D
17 23 7	8 27 10	7 33 16	2.6 39 22	8.9 44 27	78 41 30	262 35 27	313 32 25	146 33 24	43 33 18	4.2 29 12	7.7 24 7
- █ Average max. and min. temperatures in °C
- █ Precipitation totals in mm
- Source: IMD
Imperial conversion
J	F	M	A	M	J	J	A	S	O	N	D
0.6 73 45	0.3 80 50	0.3 91 60	0.1 102 72	0.4 111 81	3.1 105 85	10 94 80	12 90 78	5.8 91 75	1.7 92 65	0.2 85 53	0.3 76 45
- █ Average max. and min. temperatures in °F
- █ Precipitation totals in inches

Gwalior has a sub-tropical climate with hot summers from late March to early July, the humid monsoon season from late June to early October, and a cool dry winter from early November to late February. Under Köppen's climate classification the city has a humid subtropical climate. The highest recorded temperature was 48 °C and the lowest was −1 °C. Summers start in late March, and along with other cities like Jaipur and Delhi, are among the hottest in India and the world. Temperatures peak in May and June with daily averages being around 33–35 °C (91–95 °F), and end in late June with the onset of the monsoon. Gwalior receives 750 mm of rain on average per year, most of which is concentrated in the Monsoon months (from late June to early October). August is the wettest month with about 250 mm of rain. Winter in Gwalior starts in late October, and is generally very mild with daily temperatures averaging in the 14–16 °C (57–61 °F) range, and mostly dry and sunny conditions. January is the coldest month with average lows in the 5-6 °C range (41-42 °F) and occasional cold snaps that plummet temperatures down to a single digit.

Climate data for Gwalior (1991–2020, extremes 1951–present)
Month	Jan	Feb	Mar	Apr	May	Jun	Jul	Aug	Sep	Oct	Nov	Dec	Year
Record high °C (°F)	32.4 (90.3)	37.2 (99.0)	41.7 (107.1)	46.2 (115.2)	48.3 (118.9)	47.4 (117.3)	44.6 (112.3)	41.7 (107.1)	40.0 (104.0)	40.1 (104.2)	38.6 (101.5)	32.1 (89.8)	48.3 (118.9)
Mean daily maximum °C (°F)	22.3 (72.1)	26.6 (79.9)	32.9 (91.2)	38.9 (102.0)	42.1 (107.8)	40.4 (104.7)	35.2 (95.4)	33.3 (91.9)	34.0 (93.2)	34.2 (93.6)	30.1 (86.2)	25.2 (77.4)	32.8 (91.0)
Daily mean °C (°F)	14.3 (57.7)	18.6 (65.5)	24.5 (76.1)	30.0 (86.0)	34.4 (93.9)	34.1 (93.4)	30.6 (87.1)	29.3 (84.7)	28.9 (84.0)	26.2 (79.2)	21.0 (69.8)	15.7 (60.3)	25.6 (78.1)
Mean daily minimum °C (°F)	7.7 (45.9)	10.9 (51.6)	16.2 (61.2)	21.7 (71.1)	27.0 (80.6)	28.8 (83.8)	27.1 (80.8)	26.2 (79.2)	24.8 (76.6)	19.3 (66.7)	13.1 (55.6)	8.5 (47.3)	19.2 (66.6)
Record low °C (°F)	−1.1 (30.0)	−0.3 (31.5)	5.4 (41.7)	11.8 (53.2)	17.2 (63.0)	18.2 (64.8)	20.1 (68.2)	19.6 (67.3)	15.1 (59.2)	8.9 (48.0)	3.0 (37.4)	−0.4 (31.3)	−1.1 (30.0)
Average precipitation mm (inches)	12.9 (0.51)	14.4 (0.57)	6.4 (0.25)	7.5 (0.30)	16.6 (0.65)	85.1 (3.35)	224.0 (8.82)	241.8 (9.52)	141.4 (5.57)	27.1 (1.07)	6.8 (0.27)	6.3 (0.25)	790.4 (31.12)
Average rainy days	1.1	1.0	0.8	0.9	1.9	4.6	10.9	11.8	6.4	1.3	0.2	0.7	41.7
Average relative humidity (%) (at 17:30 IST)	56	42	30	23	24	40	66	74	64	54	57	60	49
Source 1: India Meteorological Department
Source 2: Tokyo Climate Center (mean temperatures 1991–2020)

Gwalior has been ranked 26th best "National Clean Air City" (under Category 1 >10L Population cities) in India.

=== Environment ===
Gwalior was found to have the second-highest level of air pollution according to a World Health Organization study in 2016. Particulates from the burning of garbage and fossil fuels make breathing the air of this city a hazard.

== Government ==
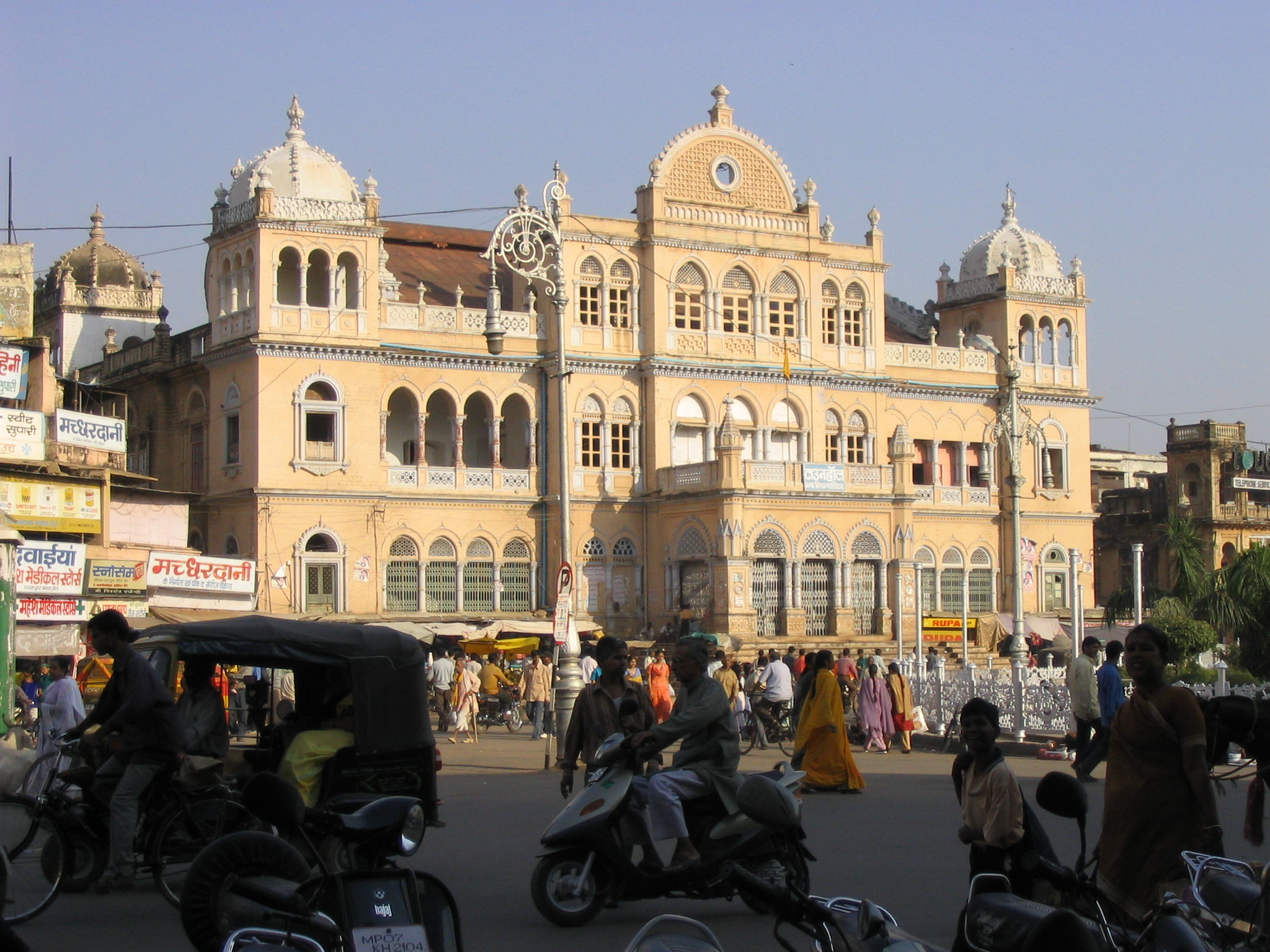
Gwalior Town hall

The administration of Gwalior is shared between the departments and institutions of three levels of government – civic administration by the Gwalior Municipal Corporation, state administration by government of Madhya Pradesh, and the central government of India.

The judiciary has four levels: the lowest level being the Gwalior Gram panchayat (or "Gram Nyayalaya"). Above the gram panchayat is the District Court for Gwalior district sits Lashkar. Above that, the Madhya Pradesh High Court has its main seat in Jabalpur, but also a permanent bench in Gwalior city. The final court of appeal is the Supreme Court of India.

=== Gwalior Municipal Corporation ===
The Gwalior Municipal Corporation is responsible for the civic infrastructure and administration of the city, which is divided into 66 wards.

Shobha Satish Sikarwar(INC) is the present Mayor of Gwalior. The Municipal Commissioner, a member of the Indian Administrative Service, is responsible for the corporations finances and for the services and works conducted for the city.

Gwalior Municipal Corporation covers an area of 414 square kilometres (160 sq mi). The municipality was created on 6 June 1887 with two divisions for Lashkar and Morar, which later were merged with a single constitutional body.

=== State government ===
There are four seats in the state legislative assembly (the "Madhya Pradesh Vidhan Sabha") responsible for the Gwalior municipal area, the constituencies being Gwalior, Gwalior Rural, Gwalior East and Gwalior South. Prior to the 2008 boundary changes the seats were "Gird", "Lashkar East" and "Lashkar West".

State institutions include:

- Office of The Accountant-General (AG) of Madhya Pradesh
- Office of The President-Board of Revenue of Madhya Pradesh
- Office of The Transport-Commissioner of Madhya Pradesh
- Office of The Commissioner-Land Records & Settlements Madhya Pradesh
- Office of The State Excise Commissioner of Madhya Pradesh

=== Central government ===
The national assembly seat covering Gwalior is the Gwalior (Lok Sabha constituency).

In the June 2024 General Election, Bharat Singh Kushwah of Bharatiya Janata Party had been elected as the Member of Parliament from Gwalior.

Central government institutions include:

- Office of the Registrar of Companies under Ministry of Corporate Affairs
- Tactics and Air Combat Development Establishment
- Defense Research & Development Establishment (DRDE)
- Border Security Force (BSF) Academy
- Indian Air Force Station (Maharajpura Airbase) Gwalior
- National Cadet Corps (NCC) Officer's Training Academy (OTA)
- Office of The Narcotics Commissioner of India (Central Bureau of Narcotics)
- Central Intelligence Bureau HO
- Central Institute of Petrochemicals Engineering & Technology
- Indian Army Cantonment (Morar Cantonment), Gwalior
- Central Reserve Police Force, Central Training College (CRPF-CTC), Gwalior
- Central Potato Research Institute, Gwalior
- Centre for Advanced Maintenance Technology (Ministry of Railways)
- The Madhya Pradesh High Court Judicature at Gwalior
- National Horticulture Board Centre
- Kendriya Vidyalaya Sanghatan, Gwalior (Under Ministry of Education, Government of India)

== Transport and connectivity ==
=== Gwalior Junction Railway Station ===
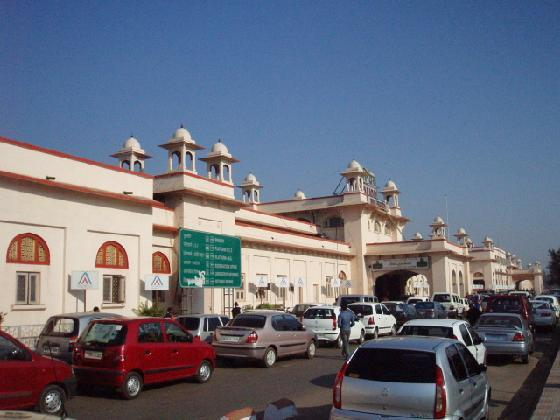
Gwalior Junction

Gwalior is a major railway junction in the Northern central region. The Gwalior Junction (Station code: GWL) is the part of the North Central Railways. Gwalior is one of the few places where both narrow gauge and broad gauge railways tracks were operational (until the line closed in 2020). Gwalior was the terminus for the longest narrow-gauge route operating in the world, covering a distance of 198 km (123 mi) from Gwalior Junction to Sheopur. Gwalior Junction is a six-railway track intersection point. It won an award for the best and cleanest station of North Central Railway zone.

Gwalior has 3 railway stations within city limits namely:

Station name

- Birla Nagar station
- Sithouli Station
- Dabra Station

Travellers can board/de board from Gwalior Junction Railway Station from these routes namely:

1. Goes to Delhi (NDLS)
2. Goes to Bhopal (BPL)
3. Goes to Indore (IND)
4. Goes to Etawah (ETW)
5. Goes to Kota (New line to be completed by 2025)

Gwalior is one of the major commercial railway stations of the North Central Railway, whose zone headquarters is centred in Prayagraj. The station has won awards from Indian Railways for excellent clean infrastructure in 1987, 1988, 1989 and 1992. It is in the Adarsh Station Category of Indian Railways.

Gwalior Light Railway connected to the Kuno Wildlife Sanctuary in Sheopur. It is being converted to broad gauge and may commence service as a broad-gauge line in future, connecting Gwalior to Kota, Rajasthan via Sheopur. It is the junction point to reach tourist destinations like Shivpuri, Dholpur and Bhind. Gwalior is on the Main train line between Delhi (station code: NDLS) and Mumbai (Bombay; CSTM) and between Delhi and Chennai (MAS).

Some trains starting here and travelling towards Eastern India via Gwalior Junction – Jhansi Junction provide direct connections to points in eastern India including Kolkata, Durgapur, Barauni, Varanasi, and Allahabad. There are about fifty trains to New Delhi and Agra every day, and around the same number of trains to the Bhopal and Nagpur stations. However, fewer trains are available for long routes like Mumbai and Chennai. The luxury trains – the Maharaja Express and the India on Wheels – stop at Gwalior on their week-long round trip of tourist destinations in Central India. More than 180 trains stop at Gwalior Railway Station

=== Road ===
Gwalior has an excellent connectivity to other parts of Madhya Pradesh and India by national and state highways. The proposed North-south-Corridor of the Golden-Quadrilateral Highway project passes through the city. The Agra-Bombay national highway (NH3) passes through Gwalior, connecting it to Shivpuri on one end and Agra on the other. The Yamuna Expressway is easily accessible from Agra for the travellers going to New Delhi.

The city is connected to the Jhansi by the National Highway 75, towards the south of the city. The northern part of the city is connected to the city of Mathura via National Highway 3. There are bus services to and from all major and minor cities near Gwalior, including Bhopal, Jaipur, Bharatpur, Agra, Delhi, Lucknow, Jabalpur, Jhansi, Bhind, Morena, Dholpur, Etawah, Datia, Indore, Sawai Madhopur, Karauli, Sheopur Kala etc.

The Government of India is developing 3 expressways in Gwalior namely: I. Gwalior Agra Greenfield Expressway, II. Chambal Expressway and III. Gwalior Lakhnadon Expressway.

Gwalior Etawah Expressway and Gwalior Indore Expressway have also been proposed to ease the traffic congestion.

=== Airport ===
Gwalior Airport (IATA: GWL, ICAO: VIGR), also called Rajamata Vijaya Raje Scindia Airport, is the largest airport of Madhya Pradesh. It has an Indian Air Force Base which stations Mirage fighters. Daily flights to Delhi, Kolkata, Hyderabad, Bangalore, Mumbai, Pune, Ahemdabad, Jaipur, Indore, Patna, and Jammu are available from Gwalior airport.

World famous Kuno National Park, the Madhav National Park and Chambal Wildlife Sanctuary can be easily reached from the Gwalior Airport.

=== Local public transport ===
Gwalior's public transport system mainly consists of Tempos, auto rickshaw taxis, Ola Cabs, and micro-buses. The Municipal Corporation's "Gwalior City Bus" covers some routes in the city. Blue Radio taxis are also available in Gwalior. The Tempos and auto rickshaws are often cited as a cause of pollution and road congestion, and the local government has plans to replace the Tempos with vans that will run on liquefied petroleum gas. In 2018, a 3 km cycle track was built in the city, and the city became the fourth in India to have this type of facility.

The Gwalior Metro is the proposed project for Gwalior city. The project was announced by state CM Shivraj Singh Chouhan on 17 October 2014. Hence district administration is preparing a DPR(Detailed Project Report) for The Gwalior Metro.

== Culture and cuisine ==
=== Cuisine ===
The most famous dishes which make part of the city's cuisine include:

1. Gwalior Barbat – The Barbat is a typical Gwalior way of cooking mutton in a red hot and spicy gravy using locally sourced kala masala. Gwalior Barbat is the royal signature dish of the Scindia Dynasty. It is a Dassehra speciality and every Maratha home in Gwalior will prepare this dish on the festival.
2. Gwalior Bedai – A famous local speciality breakfast dish served with chutni and gravy.
3. Gwalior ke Mangode - is a crispy fritters, spiced with local flair served with sabzi and chutney, embodying the city's street food soul. It is considered as Gwalior's culinary charm.

Apart from that Pohe-Jalebi, Kachori-Imarti, Samosa-Kadhi, Karela Chaat and Gajak are some of the famous local dishes that can be enjoyed in and around the city.

=== Art and literature ===
In more recent times, Akhtar family has been based out of Gwalior for at least three generations with Muztar Khairabadi, his son Jan Nisar Akhtar and his grandson Javed Akhtar being the prominent literary figures. Nida Fazli, one of the most famous Indian Hindi and Urdu poets grew up here. Former Indian Prime Minister, Atal Bihari Vajpayee, is also a well known writer and poet.

=== Music ===
Raja Man Singh Tomar, the King of Gwalior between 1486 and 1516 CE, was a patron of Drupad (Hindi: ध्रुपद). Dhrupad is a vocal genre in Hindustani classical music, said to be the oldest still-in-use in that musical tradition. Its name is derived from the words "dhruva" (fixed) and "pada" (words). The term may denote both the verse form of the poetry and the style in which it is sung.

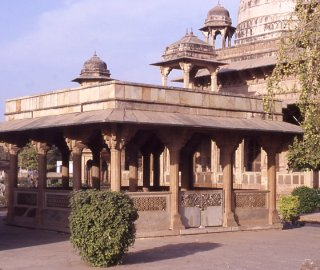
Tomb of Tansen

Gwalior holds a major position in the Indian classical music, with being the birthplace of the oldest Hindustani sangeet gharana – Gwalior Gharana. Gwalior holds an unparalleled reputation in Sangeet and has retained Indian traditions and the wealth of music intact over the years. The Gwalior Gharana is not only the oldest Khyal Gharana but it is also one of the most prominent gharana being the one to which most classical Indian musicians can trace the origin of their style. The rise of the Gwalior Gharana started with the reign of the great Mughal emperor Akbar (1542–1605). Akbar's favourite singer was Tansen, who came from the Gwalior area and whose ashes were buried in Gwalior after his death. The Tansen Tomb in Gwalior was constructed in his remembrance. Tansen Festival started in the 1930s, and currently artists from all over India come to perform in the festival.

Baijnath Prasad (also known as Baiju Bawra) was a classical singer (Dhrupadiya) who lived in Gwalior for his whole life under the patronage of Man Singh. Baiju was born in Chanderi and was cremated there. He received his musical training in Vrindaban under Swami Guru Haridas Ji. He was the court musician of Gwalior along with Nayak Charju, Bakshu, and others.

Sarod player Amjad Ali Khan is also from Gwalior. His grandfather, Ghulam Ali Khan Bangash, became a court musician in Gwalior.

==== UNESCO: Creative Cities Network for Music Category ====
In November 2023, UNESCO announced the inclusion of Gwalior in its flagship Creative Cities Network programme.

==== Tansen Music Festival ====
The Tansen Sangeet Samaroh (Tansen Music Festival) is celebrated every year on the Tansen Tomb in Gwalior during the month of December. Tansen Samaroh is a platform where artists from all over India gather and participate to deliver vocal and instrumental performances. The Tansen Sangeet Samaroh is organised by the government of Madhya Pradesh, in association with the Academy of the Department of Culture. During the festival, music lovers and artists from all over the world gather to offer their tribute to Tansen. The academy offers honours to senior celebrities and junior artists by including them in the Samaroh through their performed music.

==== Sarod Ghar ====
This Museum of Music has been set up in the old ancestral house of musician Hafiz Ali Khan. It houses ancient instruments of the Indian masters of the past. It also houses a collection of photographs and documents. Sarod Ghar is an institution devoted to promoting Indian classical music, heritage and culture. Through this 'window' to the past, music lovers can gain a better understanding of the evolution and history of Indian classical music and a deeper perspective and insight into the context of the art as it exists today.

=== Media and communication ===
There are newspapers, magazines, local TV stations and four FM radio stations in Gwalior.

Dainik Bhaskar is the leading and one of the oldest and most widely read newspapers. Swadesh and Naidunia are other well-established newspapers. More newspapers published in Gwalior are BPN Times, Raj Express, Dainik Madhya Raj, Nav Bharat, Youth Engine, Dainik Jagran, People's Samachar, Dainik Adityaz. Evening newspapers are Sandhya Samachaar, Gwalior Sandesh, Sudarshan Express.

"Aalekh-Life in Pages" is one of the leading youth magazine published and widely read across the city. SouLSteer magazine is a bi-monthly lifestyle and automotive magazine in Gwalior.

The radio industry has expanded with private FM channels being introduced. The FM radio channels that broadcast in the city include Big FM (92.7 MHz), Red FM (93.5), Chaska FM (95 MHz), My FM (94.3 MHz), and Lemon (91.9 MHz). The state-owned company, Doordarshan, transmits two terrestrial television channels. Major local channels include Hathway Win, Harsh Networks, KMJ Communications, and DEN networks.

=== Sports ===
Lakshmibai National University for Physical Education (operational since 1957) is the largest physical education institutions in Asia. Gwalior also has the Railway Hockey Stadium with artificial turf. Captain Roop Singh Stadium is a cricket ground with a capacity of 45,000. The stadium has hosted 10 One Day International (ODI) matches. Of the ten matches played so far, the first one was played between India and West Indies on 22 January 1988. The ground has flood lights and has also hosted day-night encounters. One match of the 1996 Cricket World Cup was also played on this ground, between India and West Indies.

Dhyan Chand was a famous hockey player from Jhansi which is near Gwalior. Ankit Sharma is a cricketer from Gwalior and plays in the Indian Premier League. Athletics are also played in this city, Vishal Kaim was the youngest hammer thrower of India when he participated in National Athletics Games in 2006 at the age of 14 years.

==== Stadium and Sports University ====
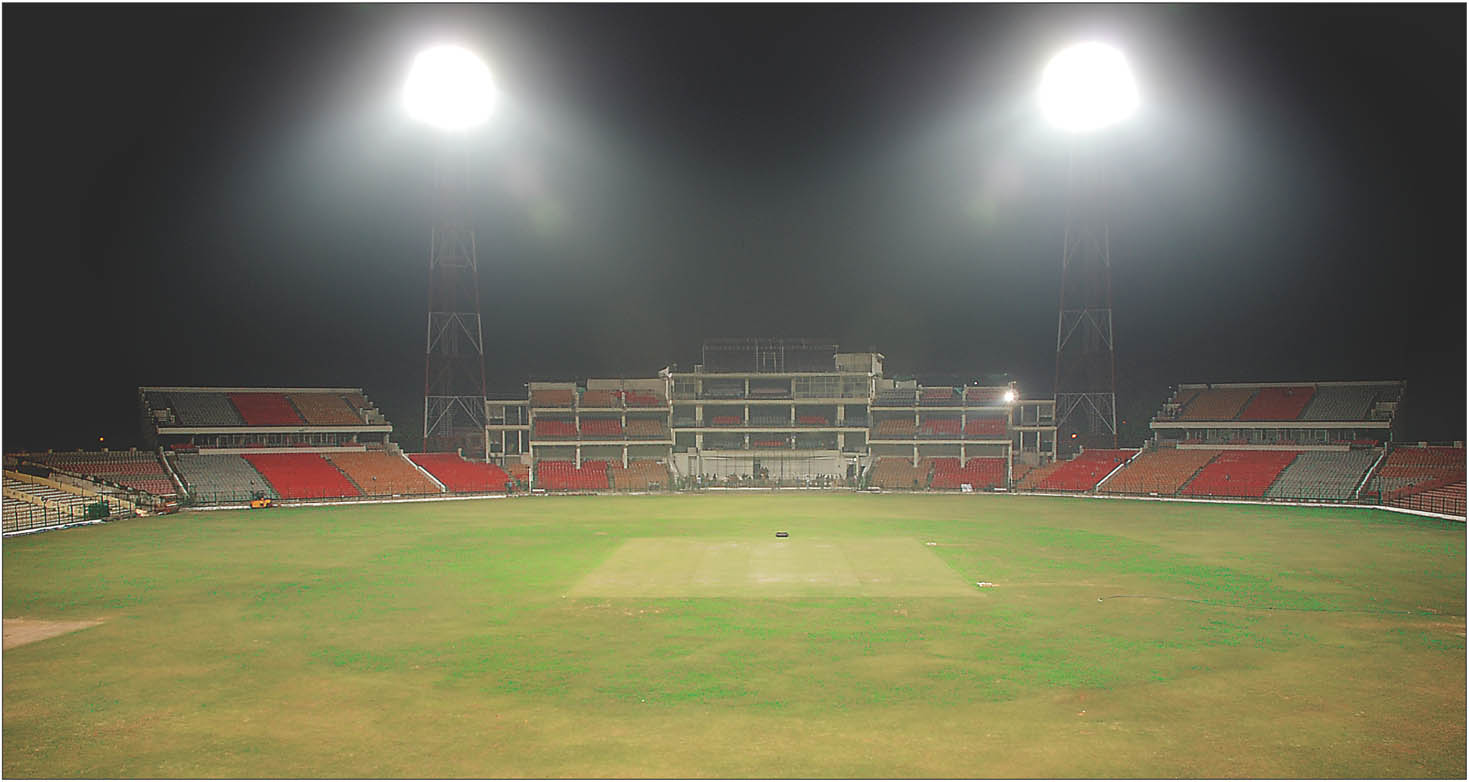
Captain Roop Singh Stadium

- Captain Roop Singh Stadium is a cricket ground in Gwalior. The stadium has hosted ten One Day International (ODI) matches. Of the ten matches played so far, the first one was played between India and West Indies on 22 January 1988. It can hold 45,000 people at a time. It was originally a hockey stadium named after great Indian hockey player Roop Singh, brother of hockey player Dhyan Chand. The ground has flood lights and has hosted day-night encounters as well. One match of the 1996 Cricket World Cup was also played on this ground, between India and West Indies. This ground is notable for hosting the ODI between India and South Africa in which Sachin Tendulkar scored the first-ever double century in ODI cricket.
- The Lakshmibai National University of Physical Education (LNIPE), Gwalior was established by the Ministry of Education & Culture, Government of India as Lakshmibai College of Physical Education (LCPE) in August 1957, the centenary year of the War of Independence. It is located at Gwalior, where Rani Lakshmibai of Jhansi, a heroine of the war, died during the rebellion in 1857. The Institute started as an affiliated college of the Vikram University, Ujjain and then came to the folds of Jiwaji University, Gwalior in 1964. The institute was given the status of National importance, and hence it was renamed as Lakshmibai National College of Physical Education (LNCPE) in 1973. In recognition of its unique status and character and to facilitate its further growth, the college was conferred the status of an ′Autonomous College′ of Jiwaji University, Gwalior in 1982.
- Shrimant Madhavrao Scindia International Cricket Stadium at Shankargarh is a newly built international stadium at Gwalior West. It has a seating capacity of around 100,000 spectators. It is also equipped with flood lights for night matches, 9 full length pitches, a swimming pool, sauna bath, modern gym, dressing rooms, 30 corporate boxes, media rooms, practise area, conference halls.
- The Atal Bihari Vajpayee Training Centre for Disability Sports – Gwalior (formerly Centre for Disability Sports) is an autonomous body established by the Department of Empowerment of Persons with Disabilities (Divyangjan), Ministry of Social Justice & Empowerment, Govt. of India.
- The Railway Hockey Stadium, Gwalior is one of the largest and well equipped morden hockey stadium situated in the city.

== Education ==
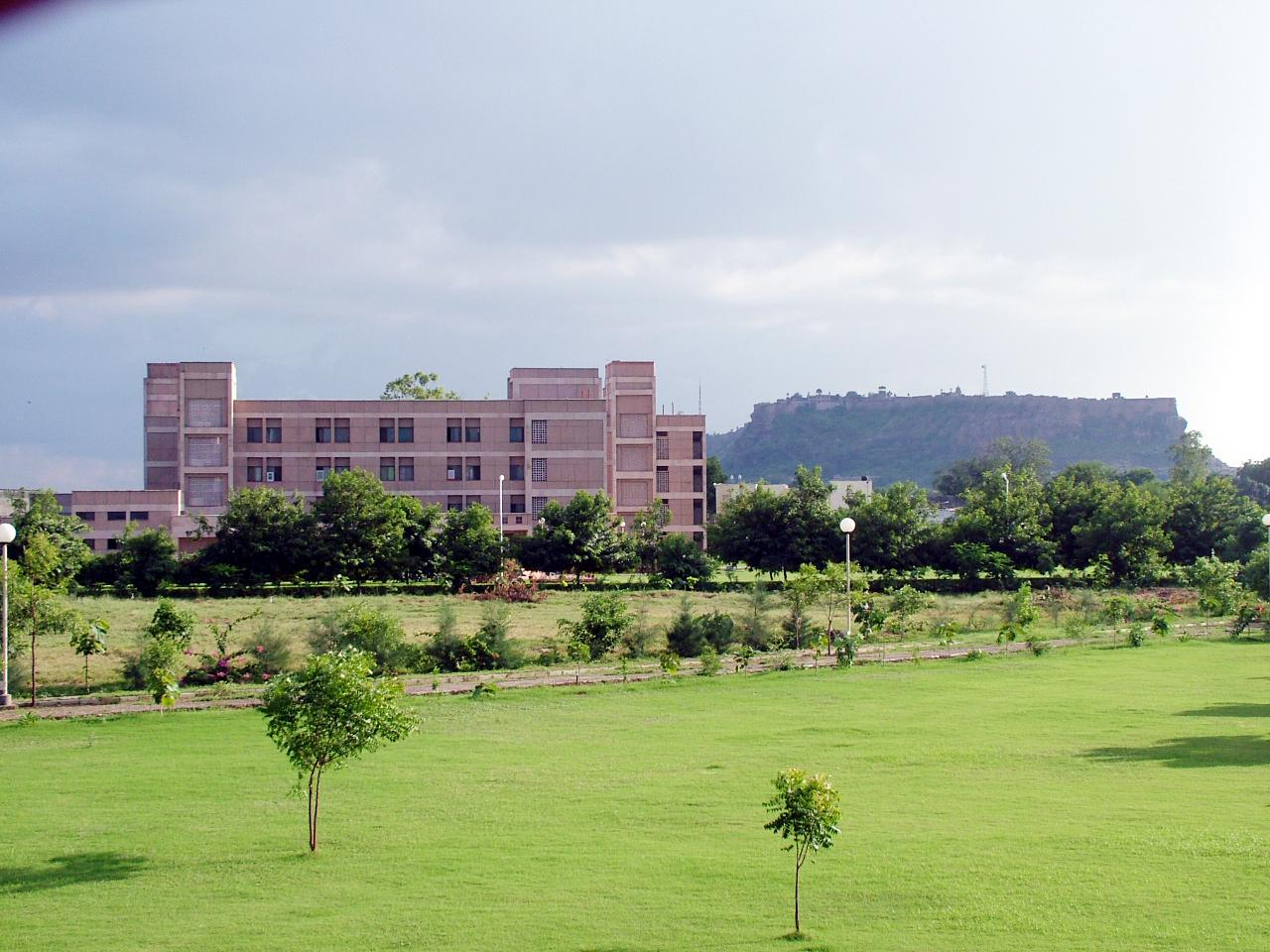
Girls Hostel, IIITM Gwalior

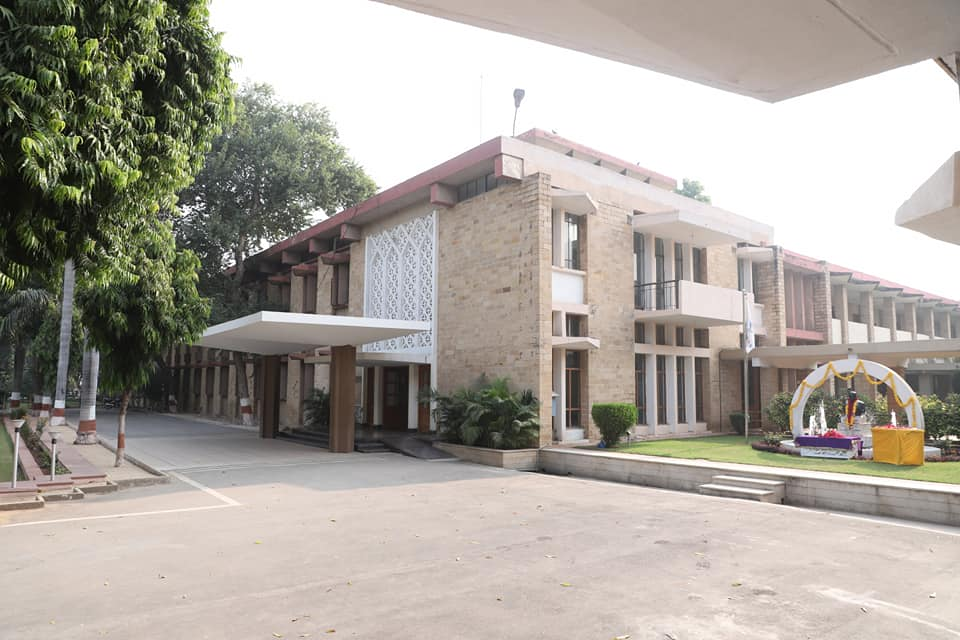
Front view of Madhav Institute of Technology & Science, Gwalior

Gwalior has developed into a significant centre of education. It hosts several prominent government and private universities and institutions including the following:

=== Universities in Gwalior ===
University	Type	Location
Amity University, Gwalior	Private University	Airport Road, Maharajpura
ITM University	Private University	Opp. Sithouli Railway Station, NH-75 Sithouli, Gwalior
Jiwaji University	State Government University	University road, City Centre
Raja Mansingh Tomar Music & Arts University	State university	Vivekanand Needam Road

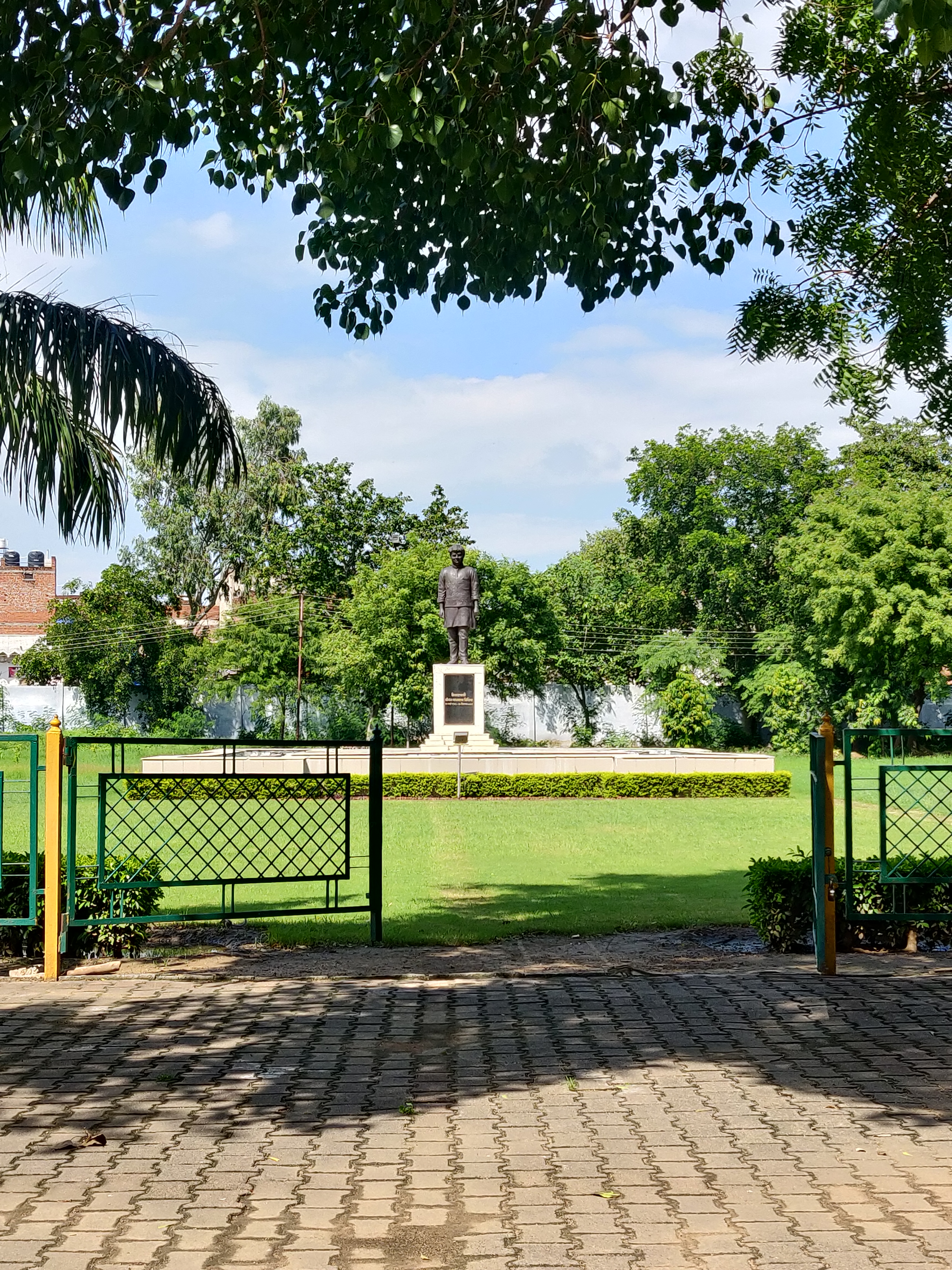
Statue of Madhav Rao Scindia at MITS, Gwalior

=== Prominent institutes in Gwalior ===
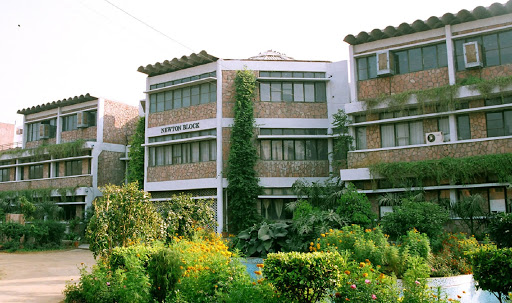
ITM GOI Gwalior

Institute	Type	Location
Gajara Raja Medical College(GRMC)	State Government	Heritage Theme Road, Lashkar
Atal Bihari Vajpayee Indian Institute of Information Technology and Management (IIITM)	Central Government	Stone Park Road
Lakshmibai National Institute of Physical Education (LNIPE)	Central Government	Racecourse Road
Indian Institute of Tourism and Travel Management	Central Government	Govindpuri
Border Security Force Academy	Central Government	Tekanpur
Officer's Training Academy (OTA)	Central Government	Station Road
Madhav Institute of Technology and Science(MITS)	Scindia Trust	Racecourse Road
Maharani Laxmi Bai Govt. College of Excellence (MLB College)	State Government	Katora Taal, Heritage Theme Road

Gwalior has six Kendriya Vidyalayas (managed by the Ministry of Human Resource Development, Government of India), several engineering and technological institutes, and more than thirty affiliated engineering colleges. The city is home to Kendriya Vidyalaya Sangathan – Zonal Institute of Education and Training (Under Ministry of Education). The ZIET Gwalior is an institution that provides national level training to the teachers inducted to teach at Kendriya Vidyalayas across India.

Notable schools in Gwalior include Scindia School (a boarding school for boys), Scindia Kanya Vidyalaya (a boarding school for girls), No.1 Air Force School, Carmel Convent School, Army Public School, Podar International School, Seth M.R. Jaipuria School and Delhi Public School.

== Gwalior Metro and suburbs ==
The 2011 census put the population of Gwalior's urban area / metropolitan region, comprising Gwalior and Morar Cantonment, at 1,117,740.

=== Old City (Fort Gwalior) ===
The old city of Gwalior, commonly called Fort Gwalior is around 1 kilometre (0.62 mi) from Hazira, the largest area in old city, which is of considerable size but irregularly built. It lies at the eastern base of the rock and contains the tomb of the Sufi saints, Khwaja Khanoon and Muhammad Ghaus, erected during the early part of Mughal emperor Akbar's reign, the tomb of Mian Tansen, a great singer and one of the 'Nine Jewels' of Akbar's court, Ladkhan (Lahori) Gate facing towards Lahore, Shahi Jami Masjid built by Mughal governor Motamid Khan, Badalgarh and Gurjari Mahal. The old city earlier called by the name of Ghauspura as it is situated near the tomb of Muhammed Ghaus. The fort city consisted of some streets and mohallas which are presumed to be 700 to 800 yrs old localities in gwalior which are still congested due to improper management of old city (Ghauspura) these old areas are as follows.

- Koteshwar Temple. This temple is a 700-year-old temple of Lord Shiva whose shivling was on Gwalior Fort, but when the Mughals conquered it they ordered the shivling thrown out. When the troops did that, the shivling was automatically established in a field below the fort without any harm. Muslim Gazi told the emperor not to harm the shivling. In the late 18th century Scindias built a temple for that shivling, now known as Koteshwar Mahadev.
- Baba Kapoor- this place is 500 meters away from Ghas Mandi. This place was named Baba Kapoor because of saint Shah Abdul Gafoor.
- Kashi Naresh ki gali- this a 600-year-old residential street in Gwalior it was given name as Kashi Naresh ki gali because in the 14th century when the emperor of Kashi was defeated in war he was sent to exile by oppositions at that time Gwalior emperor and Kashi's emperor were good friends when Kashi's emperor told Gwalior's emperor whole story, emperor gave him an entire street for living at that time which is now known as Kashi Naresh ki Gali. their family even now resides there in Kashi Naresh ki gali in Rajaji Ka Bada. (Meanings: naresh = king = rajaji; gali = street in Hindi language; bada = big area.)

=== Lashkar Subcity ===
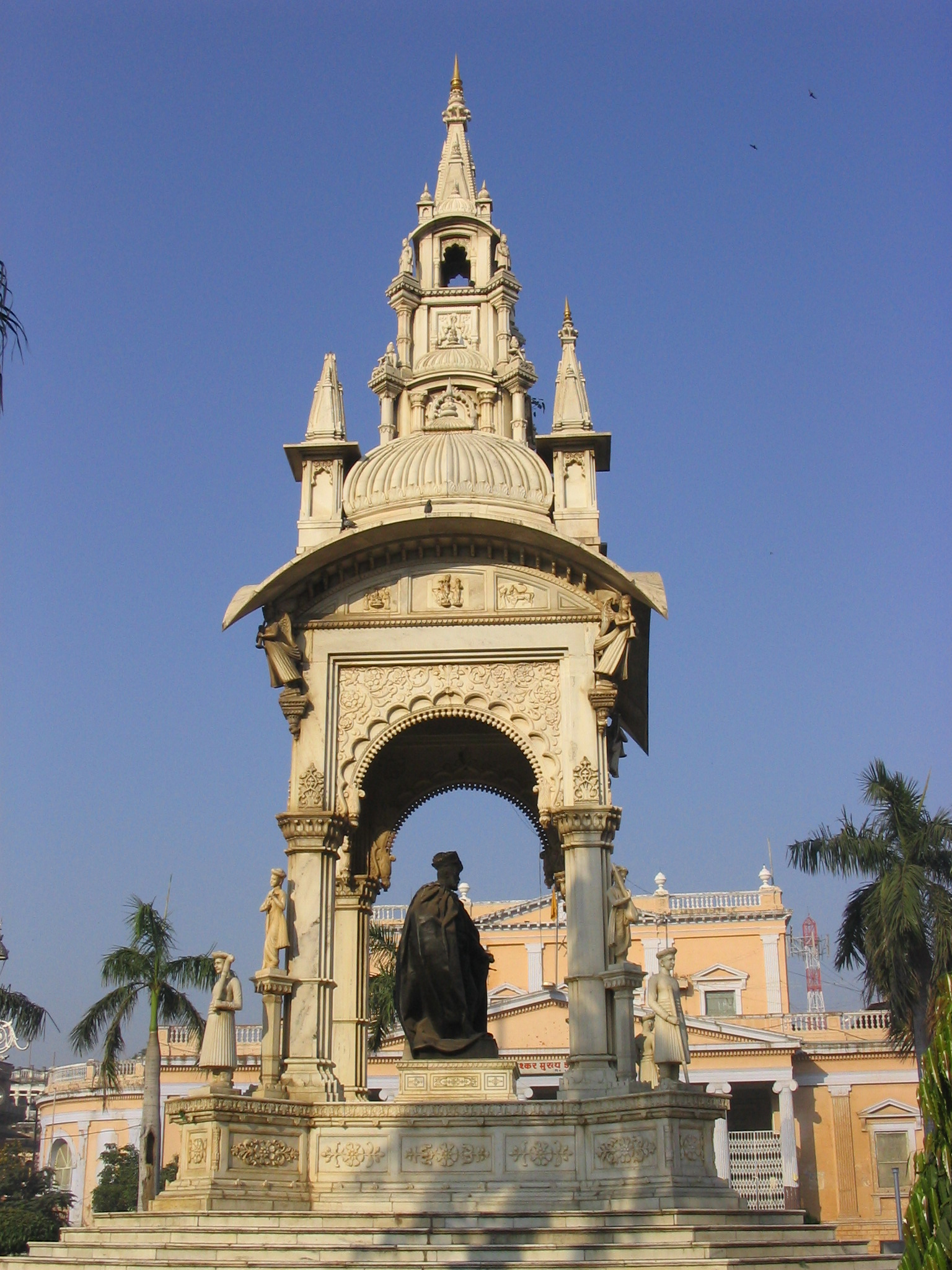
Jiwaji Chowk at Gwalior

The name of Lashkar is a Persian word meaning 'army' or 'camp', as this was originally the camp, and later the permanent capital, of the Scindia dynasty of Gwalior state. Lashkar was the capital of Madhya Bharat from 1950 to 1956.

Jiwaji Chowk is the central focus of Lashkar, with a large square, a former opera house, banks, tea, coffee and juice stands and a municipal market building. Thriving bazaars surround the chowk. Many jewellery shops are situated near Jayaji Chowk, also known as Maharaj Bada. A source of water for the city is Tighra Dam, built on the Saank river 20 km to the north. The Gajra Raja Medical College, founded in 1946 by the Maharaja Jiwaji Rao Scindia and the Maharani Vijayaraje Scindia, is situated in Lashkar on Palace Road, near Katora Taal, together with a group of hospitals. Jai Vilas Palace, patterned on the French palace of Versailles, is located here.

=== Morar Cantonment ===
Morar Cantonment, formerly a separate town, lies 5 kilometres (3.1 mi) east of the old city. It was formerly a British military cantonment. Morar is generally considered a rural farming town. The area is known as the "green part" of Gwalior because much of the area is still rural.

Morar was the scene of the most serious uprising in Central India. On 1 June 1858, Jayajirao led his forces to Morar to fight a rebel army led by Tatya Tope, Rani Lakshmibai and Rao Sahib. This army had 7,000 infantry, 4,000 cavalry and 12 guns while he had only 1,500 cavalry, his bodyguard of 600 men and 8 guns. In this attack, the rebel cavalry took the guns and most of the Gwalior forces except the bodyguard went over to the rebels (some deserted). The Maharaja and the remainder fled without stopping until they reached the British garrison at Agra. By 1900 it had become a centre for local trade and had an important training industry, with a population of 19,179 in 1901.

The Sun Temple is situated in Morar at Residency Road.

The cantonment area makes up a large area of Morar which contains official residences for the Indian Army. It has many canteens for Army personnel. Saint Paul's School and Pragati Vidyapeeth School are nearby. There is an air force base in the Pinto Park region.

=== Thatipur ===
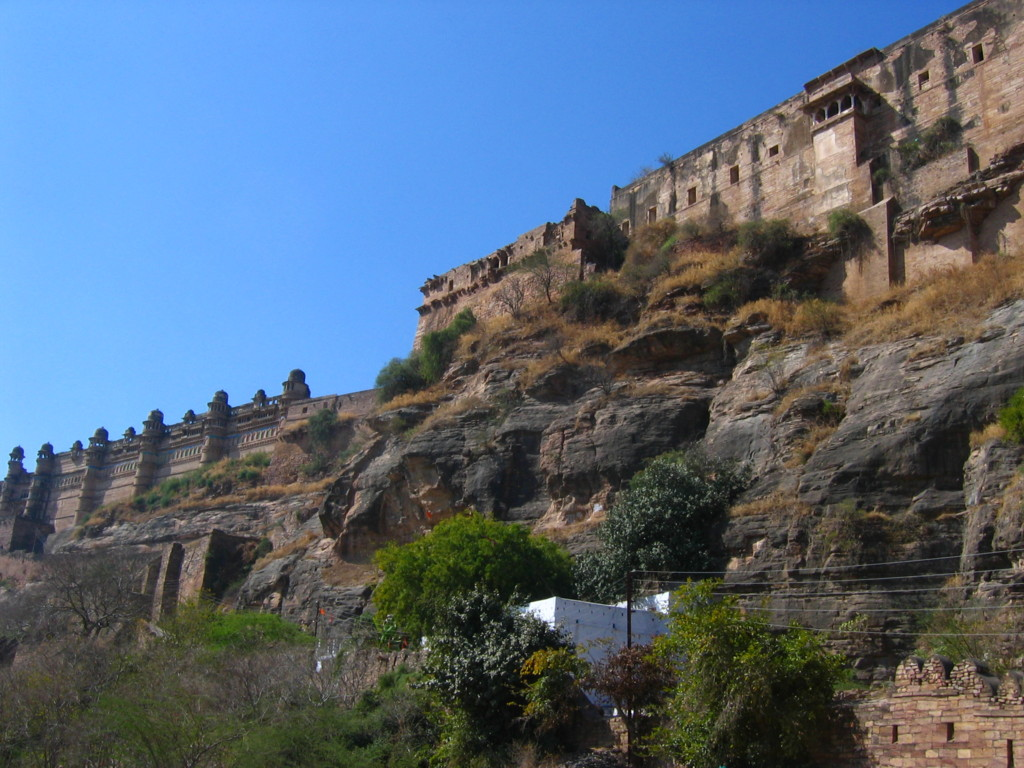
view of Gwalior Fort from the Old city

Thatipur is said to have got its name from State Army Unit 34, which once resided there. Gandhi Road divides Thatipur into two areas. Morar at one end of the road and Balwant Nagar on the other.

Thatipur primarily consists of residential areas like Darpan Colony, Madhav Rao Scindhiya Enclave, the government blocks, Vivek Nagar, and Suresh Nagar. Places of note are the Dwarikadhish Mandir, Bhagwan colony, Tomar building, Chauhan Pyaau (The Chauhan family), Galla Kothar, Ramkrishna Aashram, Saraswati Nagar, Govindpuri, Gayatri Vihar, Shakti Vihar, Shakuntalapuri, Dushyant Nagar, Shanti Vihar, and Mayur market along with Sai Baba Mandir in Shakti Vihar colony.

== Healthcare ==
The prominent hospitals of Gwalior include Gajara Raja Medical College and the associated J.A. Hospital, Kamla Raja Hospital, Sahara Hospital, Mascot Hospital, BIMR Hospital, Cancer Hospital & Research Institute and many private doctor clinics. The Cancer Hospital & Research Institute is a nationally acclaimed medical centre in Oncology. There is also a charitable hospital named SATCH (Shri Anandpur Trust Charitable Hospital) which provides free treatment. There is a government Ayurvedic college and a private homoeopathic college (Vasundhara Raje Homoeopathic Medical College) which is run by the Biochemic and Homoeopathic Association of Gwalior, also providing health care education and services.

== Future developments ==
Gwalior West is being developed as a "Counter Magnet" project with funding support from the National Capital Region. It has been introduced to increase investment in education, industry and real estate. This is hoped to counteract the closing of manufacturers such as Hotline, Cimmco and Grasim Gwalior.

Gwalior is selected for the establishment for second AIIMS after Bhopal AIIMS.

Britannia has announced to set up a wafer factory in Gwalior.

The Gwalior Master plan launched by the local collector and municipal corporation initiates to improve the basic civic infrastructure of the city to meet the growing population of the city as well as to make the city beautiful for tourists.

== Architecture ==
=== Gwalior Fort ===
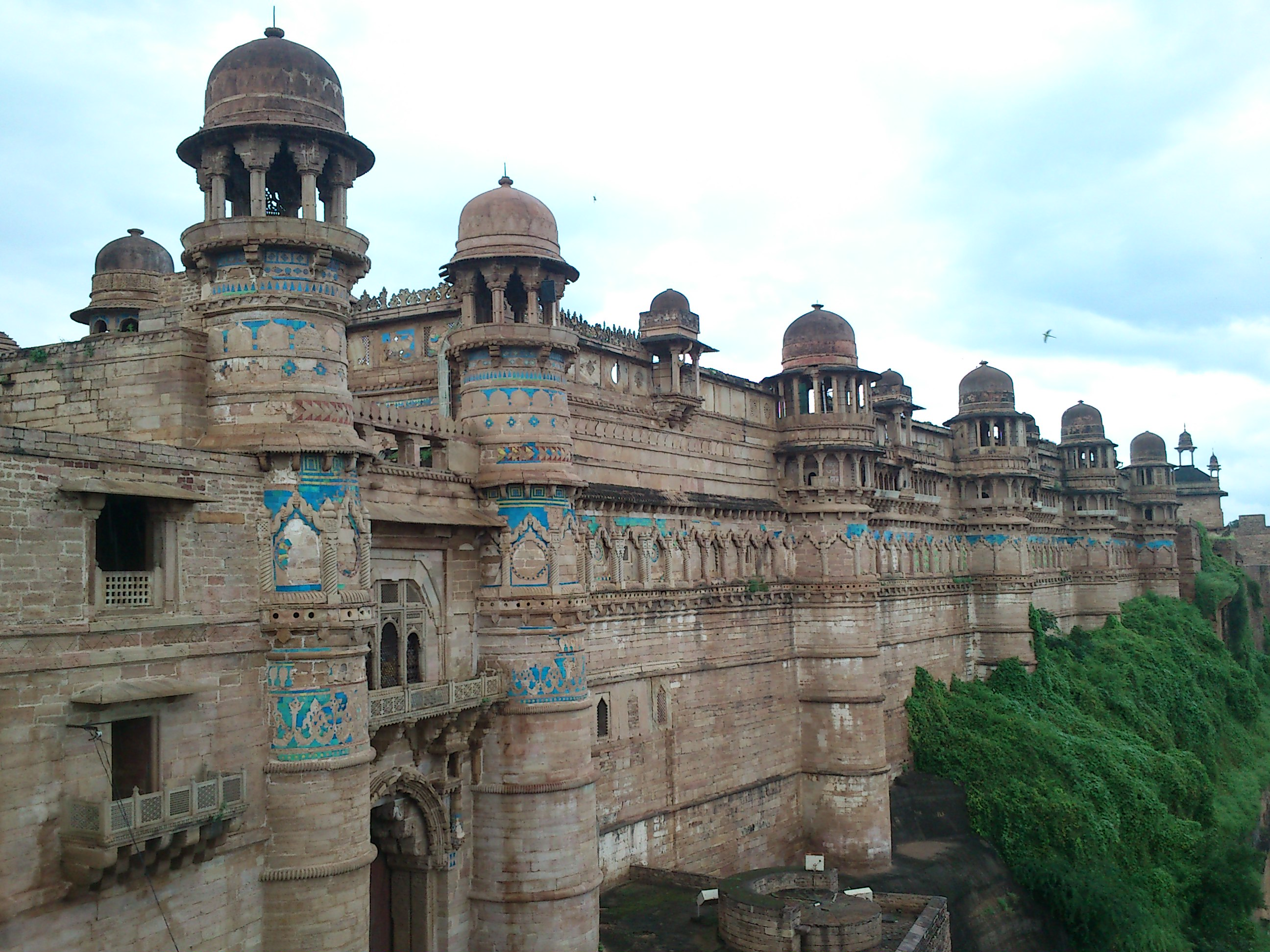
Gwalior fort front side view

At the heart of Gwalior is Gwalior Fort of the Tomara dynasty. This structure was reputed to be one of the most structurally sound forts of India, having been improved by Raja Man Singh Tomar where a previous structure existed. It occupies an isolated rock outcrop. The hill is steepened to make it virtually unscalable and is surrounded by high walls which enclose buildings from several periods. The old town of Gwalior lies at the eastern base of the fortress. Lashkar, founded by Daulat Rao Scindia, formerly a separate town that originated as a military camp, lies to the south, and Morar, also a formerly separate town, lies to the east. Gwalior, Lashkar and Morar are part of the Gwalior Municipal Corporation.

The Fort, popularly called "the Gibraltar of India", overlooks the city. The Emperor Babur reputedly described it as "the pearl in the necklace of the forts of Hind". This fort's architecture is unique. It displays a Chinese influence on Indian architecture, as Chinese dragons have been crafted at the hilt of the pillars. This influence was due to trade between China and India at the time of the fort's construction.

After the death of Sher Shah Suri in 1545, who was ruling North India at that time, his son Islam Shah shifted his capital from Delhi to Gwalior and constructed 'Sher Shah Mandir' (or 'Sher Shah Fort') in his father's memory. Islam Shah operated from Gwalior until his death in 1553. Islam Shah had appointed the Hindu warrior 'Hemu' or Hem Chandra Vikramaditya as his Prime Minister in Sher Shah Fort for the first time, who later on became the Hem Chandra Vikramaditya king at Delhi and established 'Hindu Raj' in North India.

In the east of the city are two examples of early Mughal architecture: the mausoleum of the 16th century Sufi Saint Ghous Mohammed and the tomb of Mian Tansen, a singer and one of the 'Nine Jewels' of the Mughal Emperor Akbar's court. Right next to them is the Gujari Mahal, built by Tomar Rajput King Man Singh Tomar on demand of his consort Gujar princess Mrignayani. Close to the heart of the city is Jai Vilas Palace of the Scindia dynasty, patterned on the palace of Versailles. It combines Tuscan, Italian and Corinthian styles of architecture. Historically and architecturally, Gwalior is interesting first as an ancient seat of Jain worship; second for its example of palace architecture of the Hindu period between 1486 and 1516; and third as an historic fortress. Many historical places are found near the Dabra-Bhitarwar Road. Prior to the founding of Gwalior, the region was also known by its ancient name of Gopasetra. Gwalior had an institutional seat of the Bhattarakas of Kashtha Sangh and later Mula Sangh.

=== Gopachal ===
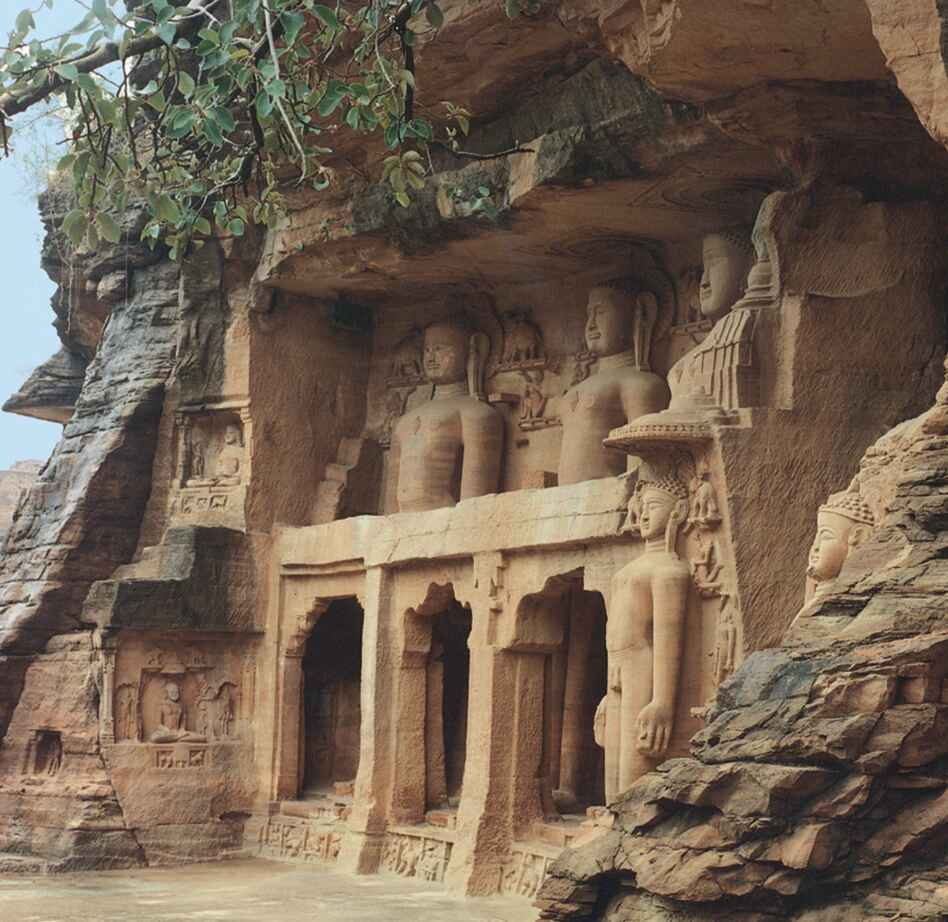
Siddhachal Caves

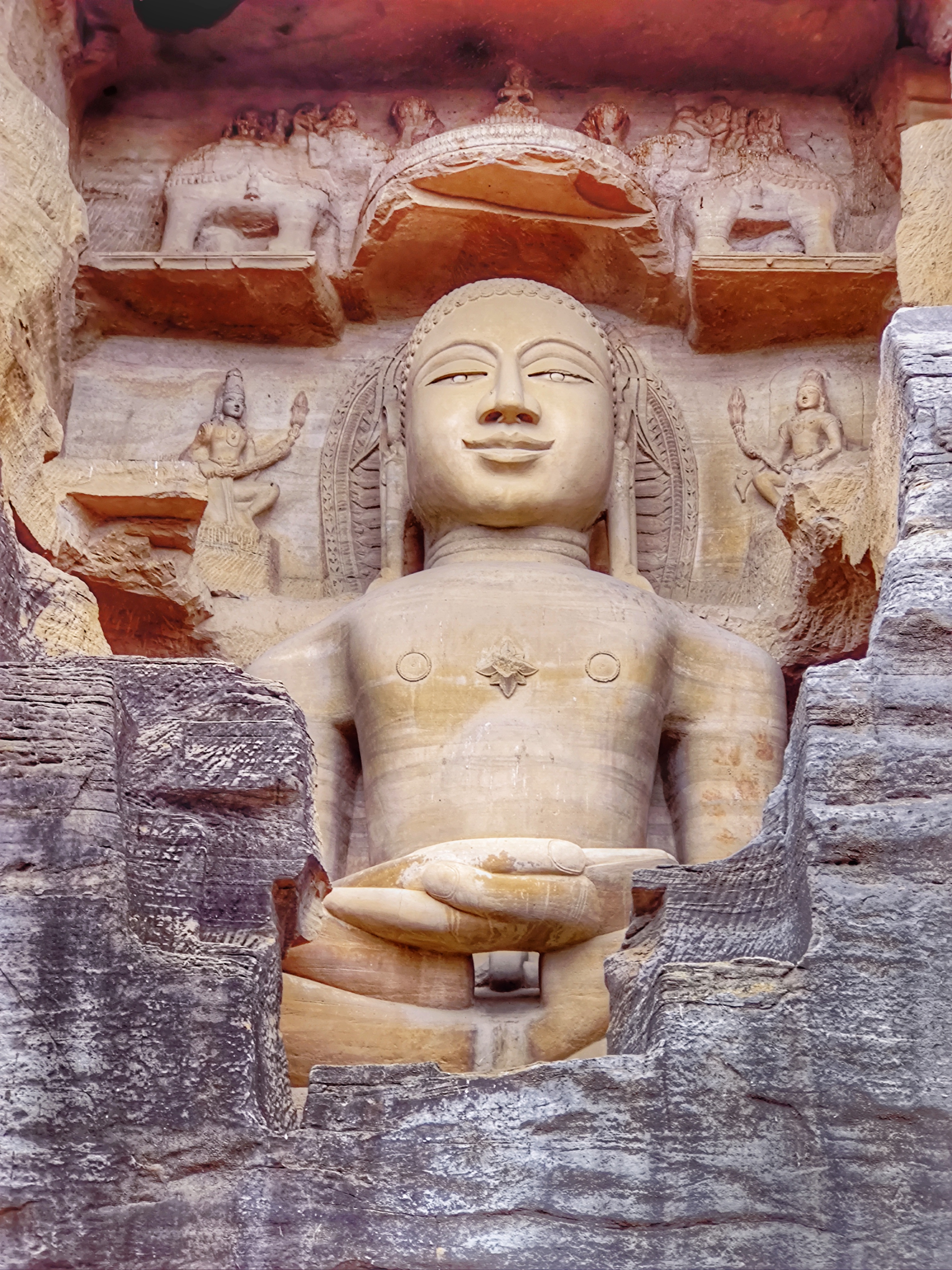
Gopachal

Rock cut images of the Tirthankaras in Gwalior

Gopachal Parvat is situated on the mountainous terrain at the slopes of Gwalior Fort. Gopachal Parvat contains unique statues of Jain Tirthankaras. The idol of Parshvanath seated on a lotus (carved out of a single stone) is the largest in the world, towering at 14 metres (46 ft) in height and 9 metres (30 ft) in breadth. There is a series of 26 Jain statues in a single line. Built between 1398 and 1536 by Tomar kings, these Jain Tirthankar statues are one of a kind in architecture.

=== Siddhachal Caves ===
Jain rock-cut sculptures of Siddhachal Caves – A striking part of the Jain remains at Gwalior is a series of caves or rock-cut sculptures, excavated in the rock on all sides, and numbering nearly a hundred, great and small. Most of them are mere niches to hold statues, though some are cells that may have been originally intended for residences. According to inscriptions, they were all excavated within a short period of about thirty-three years, between 1441 and 1474. One of the colossal figures is 57 ft (17 m) high, taller than any other in northern India.

=== Teli Temple ===
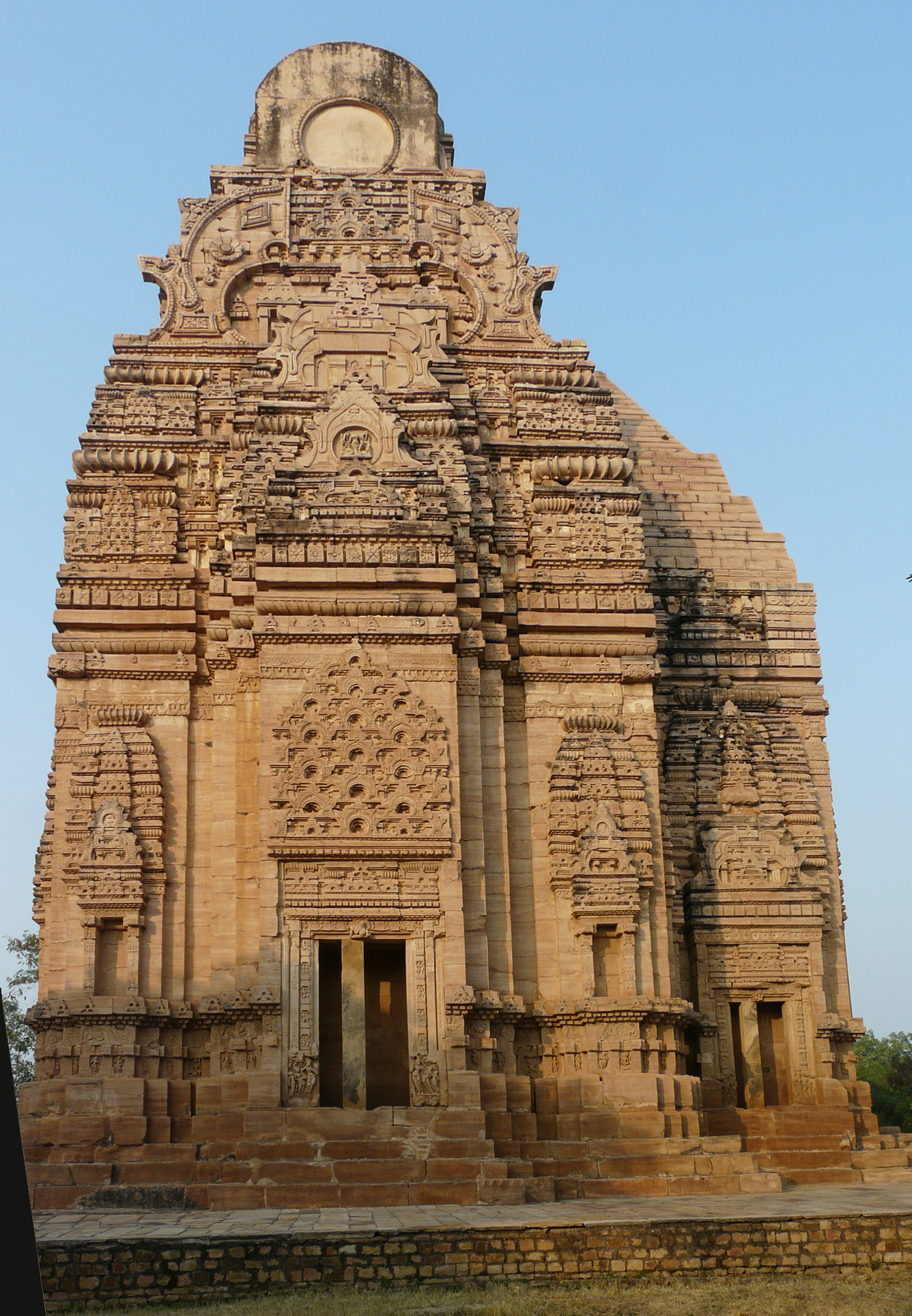
Teli-ka-Mandir

Teli Temple or in Hindi Teli Ka Mandir – A structure of about 100 feet, Teli Ka Mandir in Gwalior Fort distinguishes itself from the other compositions of its time because of its unique architecture. The temple bears a close resemblance to the temple of Prathihara Vishnu, and is filled with images of coiled serpents, passionate couples, river goddesses, and a flying Garuda. The temple architecture follows the Indo-Aryan and Nagara styles and is believed to be among the oldest constructions in the fort. The Telikā Mandir, or 'oil-man's temple', owes its name to Teli, a term for an oil grinder or oil dealer. Many suggestions have been put forward to explain this name historically, but in fact the name is not old, the temple being used for processing oil before the British occupied the fort and used the building, albeit temporarily, as a coffee shop. The Telikā Mandir is the loftiest temple among all the buildings in Gwalior Fort with a height of about 30 meters. The temple consists of a garba griha, that is, sanctum proper for the deity, and an antarala to enter into the temple. It can be approached by a flight of steps provided on the eastern side. The most striking feature of the temple is the wagon-vaulted roof, a form used over rectangular shrines which normally accommodated a row of Mother Goddesses. The goddesses from the interior vanished centuries ago and have not been traced. The exterior walls of the temple are decorated with sculptures, many of which are damaged; the niches, shaped like temples, are empty. The building carries a dedicatory inscription to the goddess in a niche on the southern side, but otherwise does not have any history. The architectural style points to a date in the late 8th Century. The entrance gateway on the eastern side is a later addition of the British period, made by Major Keith in 1881. It was built as a way of saving various historic pillars and other pieces no longer in their original context.

=== Other monuments ===
- Gurudwara Daata Bandi Chhorh- Gwalior Fort also has the Gurudwara, built in the memory of the sixth Sikh, Guru Har Gobind. This Gurudwara is particularly large and grand, built entirely of marble with coloured glass decorating the main building. Recital of the Guru Granth Sahib takes place here and Mughal kings used to visit Gwalior regularly. There is a Gurdwara that was converted to a mandir of "kalli devi" and process is on to take it back by Sikhs.
- Italian Garden - It is the most beautiful garden built in 19th century. It was a private garden used by the ladies of the Gwalior royal family. It design is Italian design which makes it unique. The garden is situated the central part of Gwalior.
- Geo Science Museum - The Gwalior Geoscience Museum is India's first geological museum serves as a gateway to the wonders of Earth's story a sanctuary of knowledge where science and art converge to inspire curiosity. It houses two exceptional galleries, offering a glimpse into the mysteries of our planet and the chronicles of life's journey through time.
- Municipality Museum, is situated a little distance from Rani Lakshmibai's tomb.
- Atal Museum - The Atal Museum has been established to commemorate the life of former prime minister Atal Bihari Vajpayee. It includes belongings and memories of Vajpayee from his Gwalior days.
- Modern 5D is Madhya Pradesh's first multi-dimensional theatre launched in the 2011 trade fair of Gwalior. It was built by Gwalior's leading enterprise Modern Techno Projects (P) Ltd. Modern 5D is recognised as India's first own multi-dimensional theatre.
- Shyam Vatika is a banquet hall which has the world's largest indoor mural, as recognised by Guinness World Records.
- Adhyatma Niketan is an important ashram near Gwalior Fort.
- Within the fort are some marvels of medieval architecture like the Man Mandir Palace, Jehangir Palace, Vikram Mandir Palace etc. The 15th century Gujari Mahal is a monument to the love of Raja Mansingh Tomar for his Gujar Queen, Mrignayani. The outer structure of Gujari Mahal has survived in an almost total state of preservation; the interior has been converted into an archaeological museum housing rare antiquities, some of them dating back to the 1st century A.D. Many of these have been defaced by the iconoclastic Mughals.

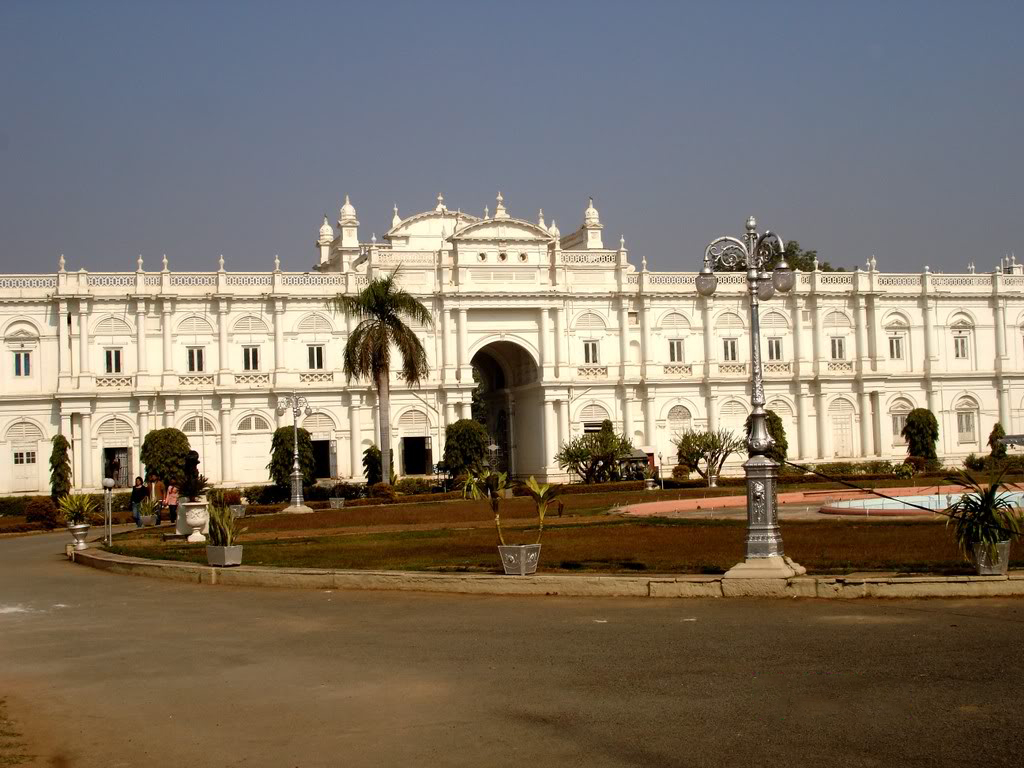
Jai Vilas Palace

=== Jai Vilas Palace ===
Jai Vilas Palace, is the residential palace turned museum of the Maratha rulers of Gwalior – the Scindias. The palace has notable collections of antiques. The museum is one of the largest in Madhya Pradesh and has the world's largest chandelier and the complex is a mixture of British and Hindu architecture. The palace was constructed in 1874 as an attempt to bring the palace of Versailles to Gwalior.

=== Tombs and Chatris of historic importance ===
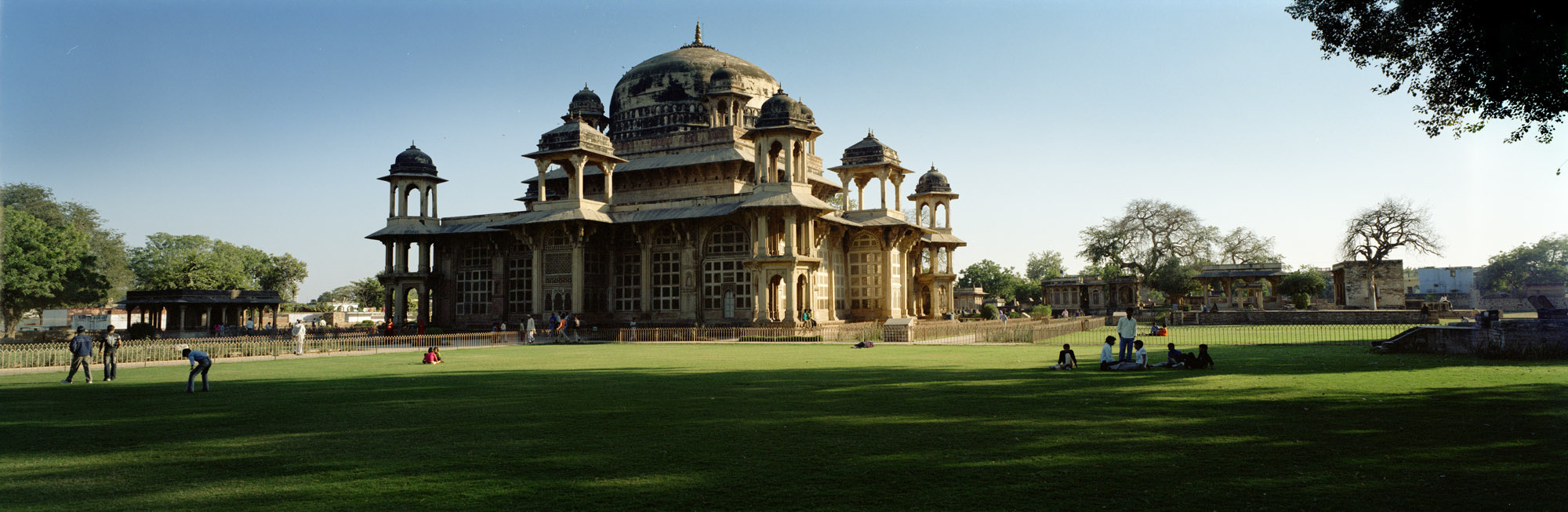
Gaus Mohammad tomb

- Chatris of Scindias is situated close to the city near Achaleshwar temple and is the burial place for the Scindias who ruled the city for numerous years. Designated persons like Maharaja Madhavrao Scindia, Vijayaraje Scindia and His Highness Jivajirao Scindia were cremated here.
- Tansen's tomb: Gwalior is the birthplace of the musician Tansen. He was one of the "Nine Gems of Akbar".
- Gaus Mohammad's tomb: The tombs of Great Gaus Mohammad and Tansen are situated on the same territory.
- Tomb of Rani Lakshmibai, a famous freedom fighter, at Phoolbag area. It is here where she died in 1858 fighting against the British. It is also her burial place.

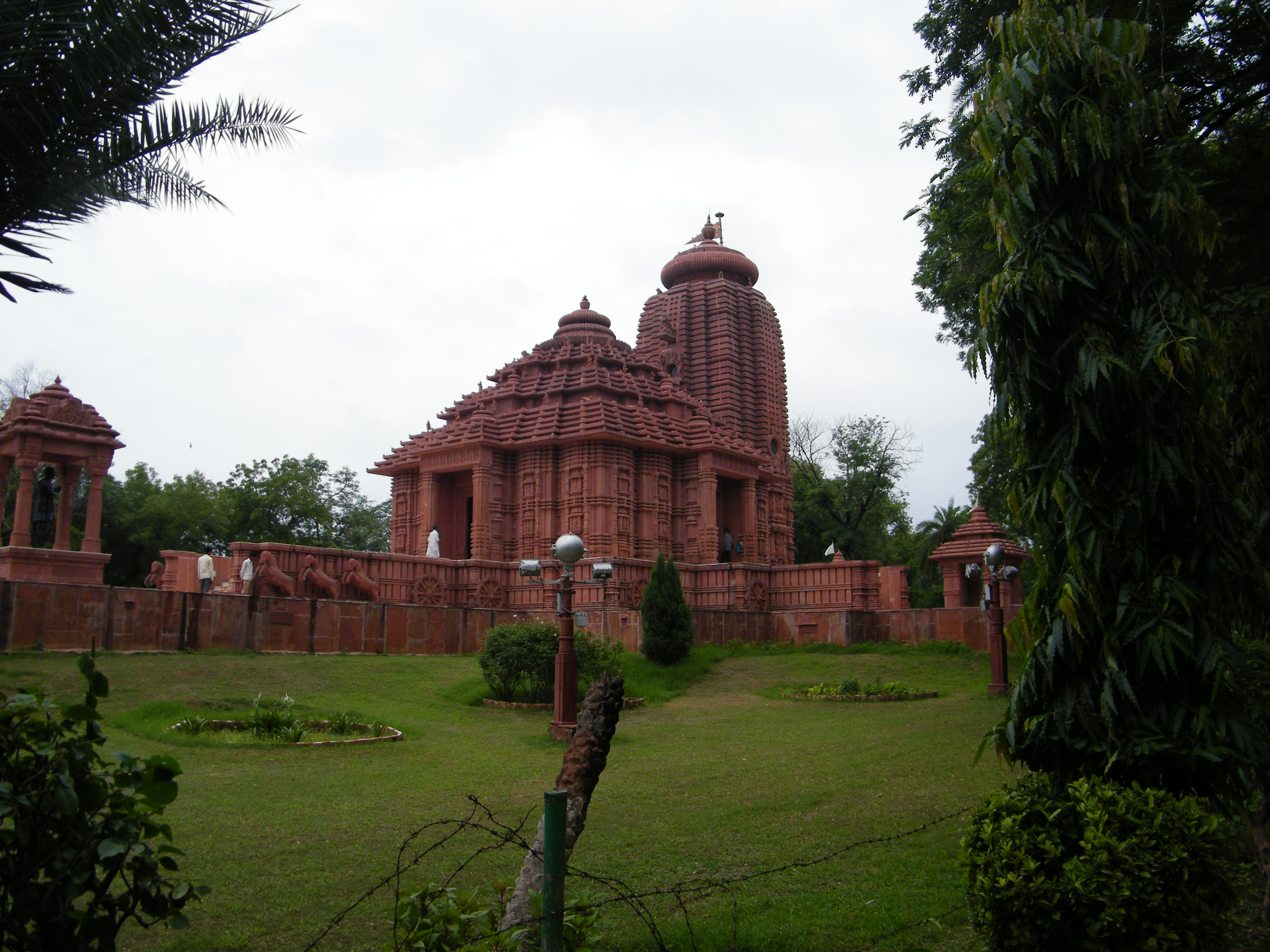
Sun Temple

=== Sun Temple ===
Located in § Morar Cantonment, the Sun Temple "Vivsvaan mandir" is dedicated to the sun god Surya. Designed as a facsimile of the Sun temple of Konark in Odisha, the temple was sponsored and built in the 1980s by the Birla family.

The temple is in a garden within the temple premises. The temple draws the locals and tourists alike who gather to render their prayers. Before the temple was built the gardens had the name Tapovan. The gardens were the location of an ill-fated attempt to introduce african lions by the Maharaja of Gwalior State.

== In popular culture ==
- There are several movies, series and daily soaps shot and filmed in Gwalior of which few have been mentioned below.
- Luka Chuppi, a 2019 Hindi-language film starring Kartik Aaryan and Kriti Sanon is largely set in Gwalior.
- Kalank, a 2019 movie produced under the banner of Dharma productions starring Alia Bhatt and Varun Dhawan was shot in Gwalior.
- Janhit Mein Jaari, a 2022 movie starring Nusrat Bharuccha was shot in Gwalior.
- Vadh, a psychological thriller murder movie was set and shot in Gwalior.
- Kathal, a comedy movie was majorly shot in Gwalior.
- Apart from these several other web series and Ad films were shot in Gwalior.

== Notable people ==
- Kartik Aaryan, actor, born and brought up in Gwalior
- Vivek Agnihotri, Indian film director, screenwriter and author born and brought up in Gwalior
- Iftikar Hussain Akhtar, Indian Urdu poet from Gwalior
- Javed Akhtar, poet, lyricist and writer, born and brought up in Gwalior
- Jan Nisar Akhtar, Indian poet and lyricist born and brought up in Gwalior
- Meet Bros, musicians and composers born and brought up in Gwalior
- Nida Fazli, Urdu writer and poet
- Muhammad Ghawth, Indian Sufi saint, poet and author
- Shifa Gwaliori, Indian Urdu poet
- Pawan Karan, Indian major Hindi poet and writer
- Anurag Kashyap, Indian Filmmaker. He did his schooling at Scindia School, Gwalior.
- Abhay Karandikar, secretary to the Government of India, Department of Science and Technology
- Sharad Kelkar, actor, born and brought up in Gwalior
- Amjad Ali Khan, sarod player and musician born and brought up in Gwalior
- Arbaaz Khan, Indian actor. He did his schooling at Scindia School in Gwalior
- Salman Khan, Indian actor. He did his schooling at Scindia School in Gwalior
- Bihari Lal, Hindi poet
- Arun Kumar Mishra, Judge of the Supreme Court of India born in Gwalior
- Piyush Mishra, Indian film and theatre actor, music director, lyricist, singer, scriptwriter, born and brought up in Gwalior
- Amitabh Mitra, Indo-English poet, visual artist and orthopaedic surgeon studied at Gajara Raja Medical College Gwalior
- Krishnarao Shankar Pandit, musician of the Gwalior gharana
- Meeta Pandit, musician of Gwalior Gharana
- Abha Parmar, actress
- Harshvardhan Rane, Telugu and Bollywood actor
- Radhika Veena Sadhika, world's first woman vichitra veena player.
- Daulat Rao Sindhia
- Jankoji Rao Scindia II
- Jayaji Rao Scindia
- Jiwajirao Scindia
- Jyotiraditya Scindia
- Madhavrao Scindia
- Madho Rao Scindia
- Vijaya Raje Scindia
- Yashodhara Raje Scindia
- Mamta Sharma, singer, born in Gwalior
- Pran Kumar Sharma, cartoonist and comic creator of Chacha Chaudhary fame moved here after the Partition
- Vishnu Dutt Sharma, politician, BJP Madhya Pradesh state president, born and brought up in Gwalior
- Mahadaji Shinde
- Navniti Prasad Singh, former Chief Justice of Kerala High Court
- Roop Singh, Indian hockey player and Olympian
- Shivendra Singh, Indian national hockey player, born and lives in Gwalior
- Kushal Tandon, Indian television actor. He did his schooling at Scindia School in Gwalior
- Tansen, court musician of the Mughal emperor Akbar
- Narendra Singh Tomar, former Agriculture Minister in Modi Government, born and brought up in Gwalior
- Atal Bihari Vajpayee, former Prime Minister of India, Hindi poet, politician and journalist, born and brought up in Gwalior
- Ganesh Shankar Vidyarthi, Hindi writer, born in Gwalior
