= Adhyatma Niketan =

- Location in Madhya Pradesh

Religion
- Affiliation: Hinduism
- District: Gwalior
- Deity: Shiva Krishna
- Festivals: Guru Purnima, Shivratri, Deepawali, Holi

Location
- Location: Gwalior
- State: Madhya Pradesh
- Country: India
- Interactive map of Adhyatma Niketan

Architecture
- Creator: Huzur Malik Saheb
- Completed: 11 April 1961

Website
- adhyatmaniketan.com Official Youtube channel =

Adhyatma Niketan is an ashram in Gwalior, Madhya Pradesh, India. It is situated on Koteshwar Road, Near Vinay Nagar sector-1, is around 7 km from the Gwalior Railway station.

The land was purchased by Huzur Malik Saheb Sant Yogi ManSingh ji in 1961 to establish an ashram. When Swami Vishnu Tirth Ji Maharaj visited Gwalior on 11 April 1960, the place was inaugurated and named 'Adhyatma Niketan'.

It is spread over 2.52 acres (10,200 m^{2}) of land at the foot-hill of Gwalior Fort. The rear part of Adhyatma Niketan is used as a residence by Sant Kripal Singh Ji Maharaj, and his family members and the front part is donated to the trust called 'Adhyatmic Shikshan and Sadhana Kendra'.

The Ashram has one big and spacious auditorium which is used for satsang, spiritual discourses, bhajan, kundalini awakening and shaktipat initiation etc., especially on the occasions of the Ashram's various festivals, when a large number of devotees gather there. On the eastern side lies the samadhin of Huzur Malik Saheb. The samadhi has sufficient space inside to accommodate around 200-250 devotees at a time for worship and meditation. Various kinds of stones including white marble have been used.

== Satsang at Adhyatma Niketan ==
Satsang at Adhyatma Niketan has assumed the greatest significance. It is understood that the disciple or sadhaka gains maximum spiritual benefit through satsang with the least effort. The Satsang at Adhyatma Niketan is practised in three parts. First in the morning with the dawn, the recitation of DHUN is practiced. DHUN is a continuous recitation of mantras. After that, nearly about 11.00 AM, the morning satsang starts. This continues for nearly three hours, in which the disciples practice meditation, bhajans (devotional songs) and ask the queries to the maharajji. In evening after sunset, 7.00 PM the evening satsang starts. This continues for nearly two hours.
