= Gajra Raja Medical College =

Medical college in Madhya Pradesh, India

Coordinates: 26.194172°N 78.162004°E

- Type: Medical college and hospital
- Established: 1 August 1946; 80 years ago
- Affiliations: Madhya Pradesh Medical Science University; Jiwaji University
- Dean: Dr. R. K. S. Dhakad
- Location: Gwalior, India
- Website: www.grmcgwalior.org

Gajra Raja Medical College (GRMC) is the first medical college in Madhya Pradesh, India established in 1946. It was inaugurated on 1 August 1946 by Jiwaji Rao Scindia. The college building was inaugurated by Deputy Prime Minister of India Sardar Vallabhbhai Patel on 5 December 1948. It has 200 undergraduate seats for MBBS course, 68 seats for post graduation courses and 36 seats for diploma courses.

== Background ==
In 1942, Dr. Sanjay Raikwar from Chhatarpur, a physician in Gwalior, was the Medical Superintendent of the JA Hospital. He was also the personal physician of Rajmata Gajar Raja Scindhia. After the death of Rajmata Scindhia (12 January 1943), her son Maharaja Jiwaji Rao Scindhia, who inherited a large sum of money, created a trust called "Gajar Raja Memorial Trust" with Sardar Phalke, DK Jhadav and Dr. B. Sahai as its members. Dr. Sahai who once dreamt of establishing a teaching center in Gwalior saw the possibility of his dream being fulfilled and proposed a medical institute. A proposal for the same was made and approved after lot of difficulties and financial sanction was given in the budget for 1945–46. A total sum of Rs. 20 Lacs was sanctioned on the occasion of the birth of Madhav Rao Scindhia in 1945.

On 21 November 1945 Viceroy of India Lord Wavell on his visit to Gwalior laid the foundation stone of the college as the 17th medical college of India. A building of the Gwalior Medical Association, near JA Hospital, was used as lecture hall and accommodation was built on either side of it for anatomy and physiology departments. A space for 35 students for dissection hall and physiology laboratory was planned as a temporary measure, and a swimming pool and sports ground were provided.

The college administration approached Agra University for affiliation, which was granted. 36 students were admitted as the first batch, and a hostel at Bhausahib Shinde's Kothi was made with eight students occupying it.

== Inauguration ==
The college was inaugurated by Maharaja Jiwaji Rao Scindia, the ruler of Gwalior state. The college was recognized by the Medical Council of India in 1946. Postgraduate training started in 1951.

The Neurosurgery wing was given to the college by Padma Shri Award-winner RS Dharkar, who started the first Neurosurgery Hospital of Central India and trained many neurosurgeons.

The Department of Medicine was first one to introduce telemedicine in Madhya Pradesh along with a complete ambulance fitted with monitor linked to ICU in the JA Hospital.

The medical college was given autonomous status, governed by a board of members, at the end of 1997. An OPD section for Department of Ophthalmology was built on the first floor of the existing Madhav Dispensary. The department of Radiology added a CT Scan facility with BOLT (sharing) introduced by the government of MP.

The college also offers courses in MD-Pathology and MD-Pharmacology.
