= Gwalior West =

- Suburb
- Location in Gwalior West Madhya Pradesh, India Gwalior West (India)
- Coordinates: 26°14′15″N 78°13′50″E
- Country: India
- State: Madhya Pradesh
- District: Gwalior
- Named for: Counter Magnet City

Area
  - Total: 300 km^{2} (120 sq mi)
  - Rank: 107

Languages
  - Official: Hindi
- Time zone: UTC+5:30 (IST)

Gwalior West is a developing city project under National Capital Region. It was started in 1992 to attract the population of Delhi. Gwalior was first city out of 5 Counter Magnets selected by the government.

== Special Area Development Authority ==
The Special Area Development Authority (SADA) was created by Madhya Pradesh government to implement the counter magnet project of the National Capital Region (NCR) in Madhya Pradesh. The chairman of its board is a political nominee. Its funding comes from the NCR Planning Board and the Madhya Pradesh government. The chief task of the SADA was to develop Gwalior West.

SADA was in April 2000 given jurisdiction over 28,102 hectares of Gwalior district, and 1,912 hectares of Morena district, totalling 30,014 hectares and 36 villages. The entire region was Master planned by a firm called DKS Consultants who further gave the planning and engineering works to Rishi Dev Architects and Associates. They successfully completed the planning of the major phases of the project in 2006. The area is bounded to the West by the Tigra reservoir and Sank river, and to the East by the AH47 (previously the NH3). The ground is considered to be poor quality for agriculture, therefore suitable for urbanization.

SADA was criticized in 2010 for inefficient budgeting, and for failing to produce a balance sheet.
