= Gwalipa =

Gwalipa was an Indian hermit-saint who lived during the 8th century AD. According to legend, Gwalipa cured the local chieftain Suraj Sena of leprosy, and in gratitude, Suraj Sena founded the city of Gwalior in his name.
