= Shyam Vatika =

Mural in Gwalior, India

Madhya Pradesh, India

The largest indoor Mural at Shyam Vatika

The World's largest indoor mural measures 904 square metres (9,730 sq ft) and was painted by six artists from 27 February 2005 to 5 March 2005 at Shyam Vatika, Gwalior, India. The art features on all interior walls and ceilings of a privately owned Auditorium named Shyam Vatika. The painting was coordinated by artist, Aasutosh Panigrahi and the owners of Shyam Vatika: R P Maheshwary and Ankur Maheshwary. This project was undertaken with the sole purpose of setting a World Record. The art project was appraised by Guinness World Records, in August 2005, as the World's Largest Indoor Mural. The record was previously held by the Youth Club, Bernie, Tasmania, Australia: 727.52 square metres (7,831.0 sq ft) and was made on 30 June 2004.
