= Khandargiri Jain Caves =

Jain rock-cut cave complex in Chanderi, Madhya Pradesh, India

- Khandargiri Jain Cave
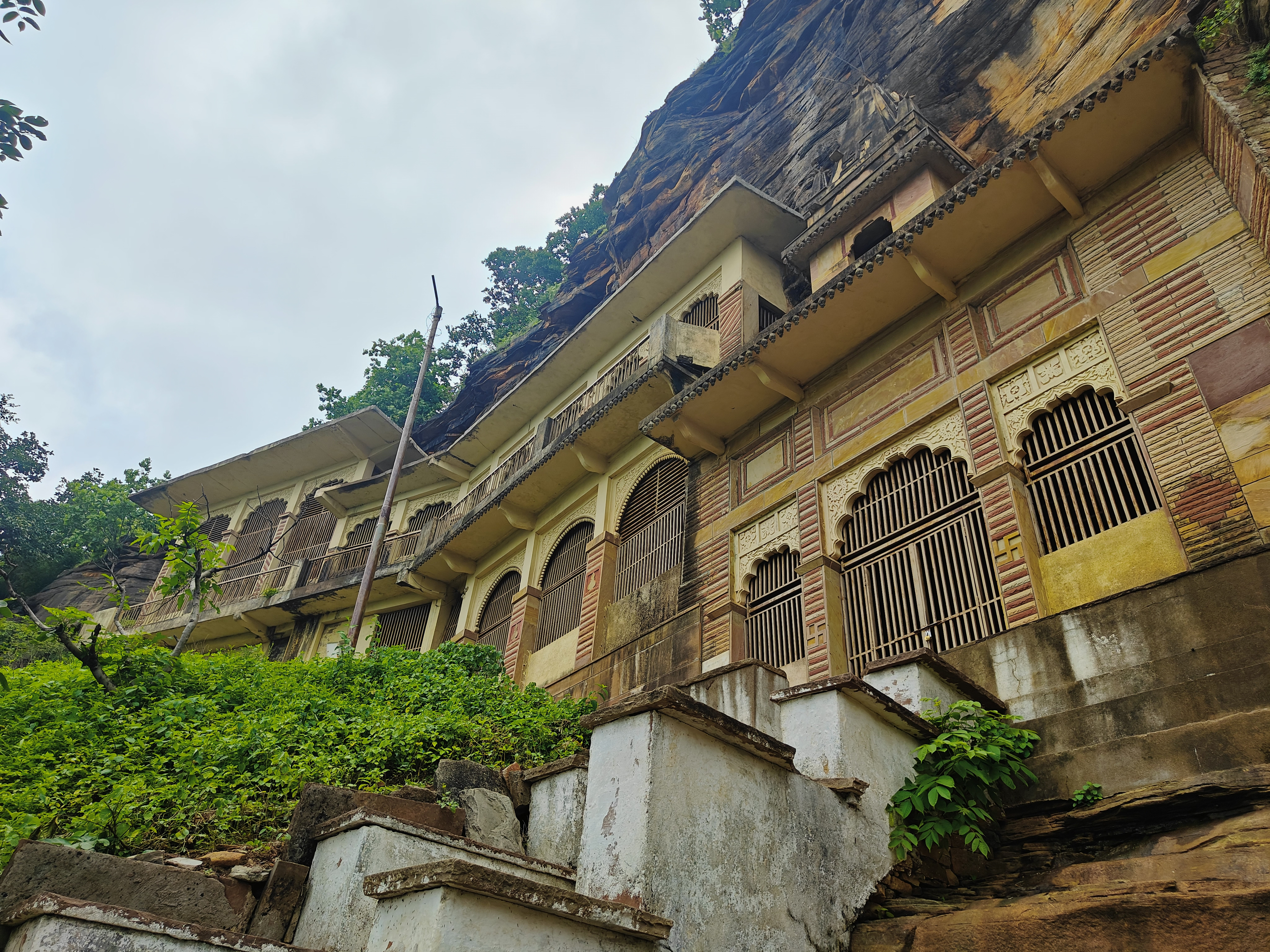
- Khandarji

- Location within Madhya Pradesh

Religion
- Affiliation: Jainism
- Sect: Digambara
- Deity: Rishabhanatha

Location
- Location: Chanderi, Ashoknagar district
- Coordinates: 24°42′4.7″N 78°08′18.2″E

Architecture
- Type: Rock-cut
- Established: 7th century

Khandargiri Jain Caves, also known as Khandargiri Jain Cave or Khandarji, are a group of Jain rock-cut monuments at Chanderi in Ashoknagar district, Madhya Pradesh, India. The site consists of six caves containing Jain sculptures and inscriptions, as well as a colossal 45 feet (14 m) rock-cut image of Rishabhanatha.

== History ==
Khandargiri cave were erected during the medieval period. The inscriptions at the site indicate that the temples date back more than seven centuries. Jain pilgrimage center consisting of six rock-cut caves and additional rock-cut spaces with carvings of Tirthankara images.

The cave dates back to medieval period. The caves along with Jain temples and museums part of the wider Jain archaeological landscape of Chanderi. The Chanderi Museum preserves archaeological material from the region, including remains associated with Jain religious establishments.

== Caves ==
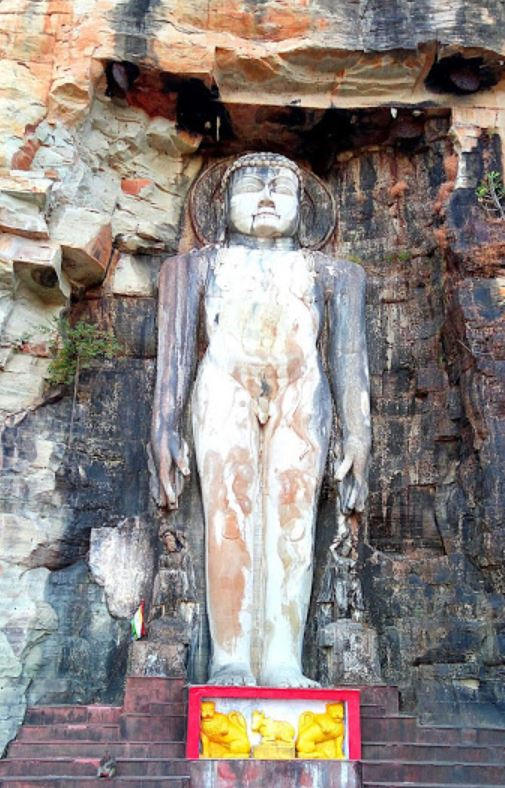
45 feet (14 m) Rishabhanatha statue

The Khandargiri hill contains six caves containing images of Jain Tirthankaras. In addition to the six caves, the hill features several other carved sculptures, some of which are accompanied by inscriptions. The heritage documentation of Chanderi notes that the hillside contains six caves with images of other Tirthankaras and that inscribed Tirthankara images occur within additional rock-cut spaces.

=== Rishabhanatha image ===
The principal monument at Khandargiri is a colossal 45 feet (14 m) idol of Rishabhanatha, also known as Adinatha. Rishabhanatha statue is carved directly into hill unlike colossal statue Gommateshwara statue.

== Inscriptions ==
Inscriptions are associated with the Jain sculptures at Khandargiri indicates that the Jain temples are more than seven centuries old. Another inscriptions 1236 CE and later dates in the seventeenth and eighteenth centuries.

== Gallery ==
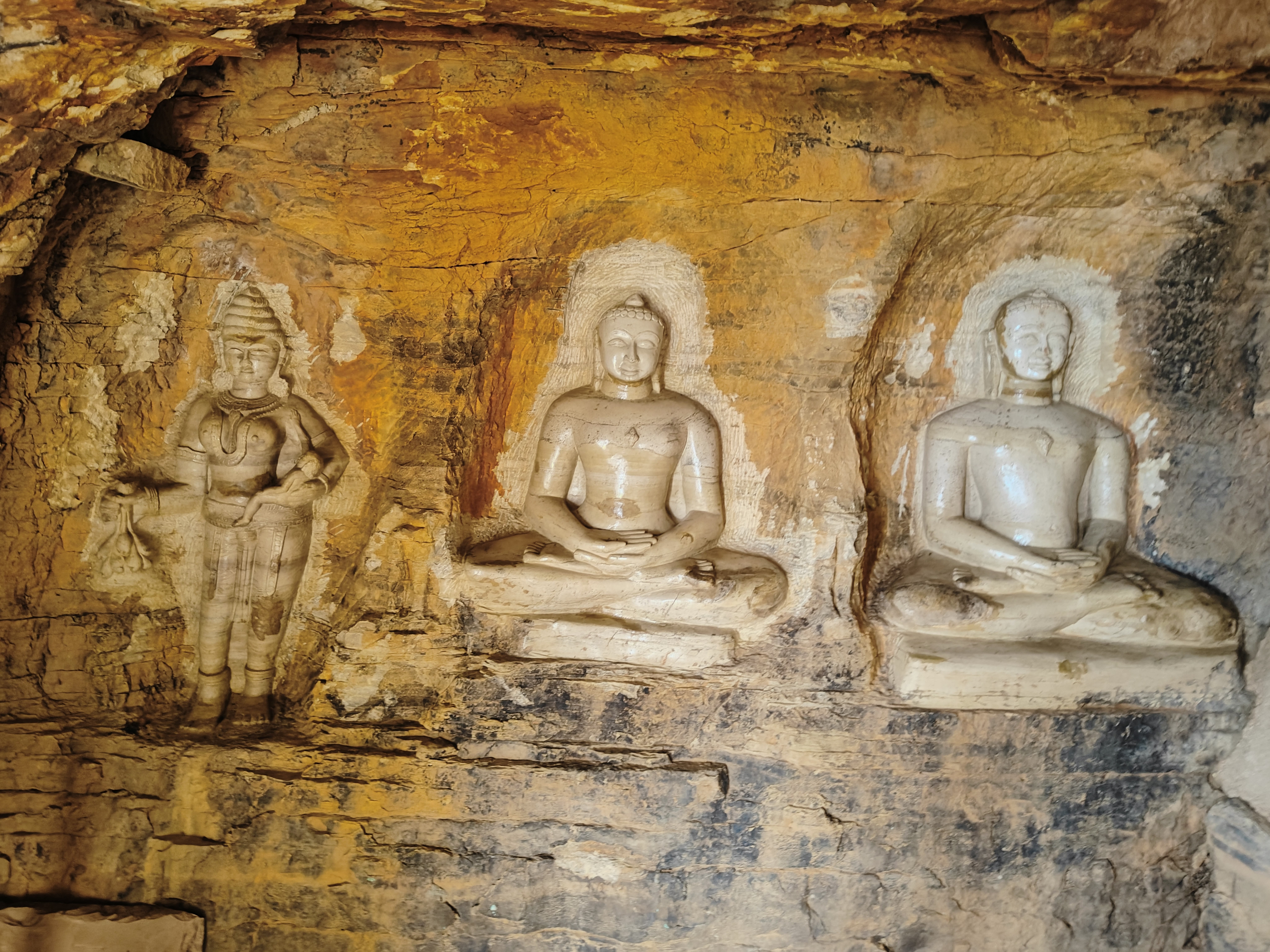
Tirthankar

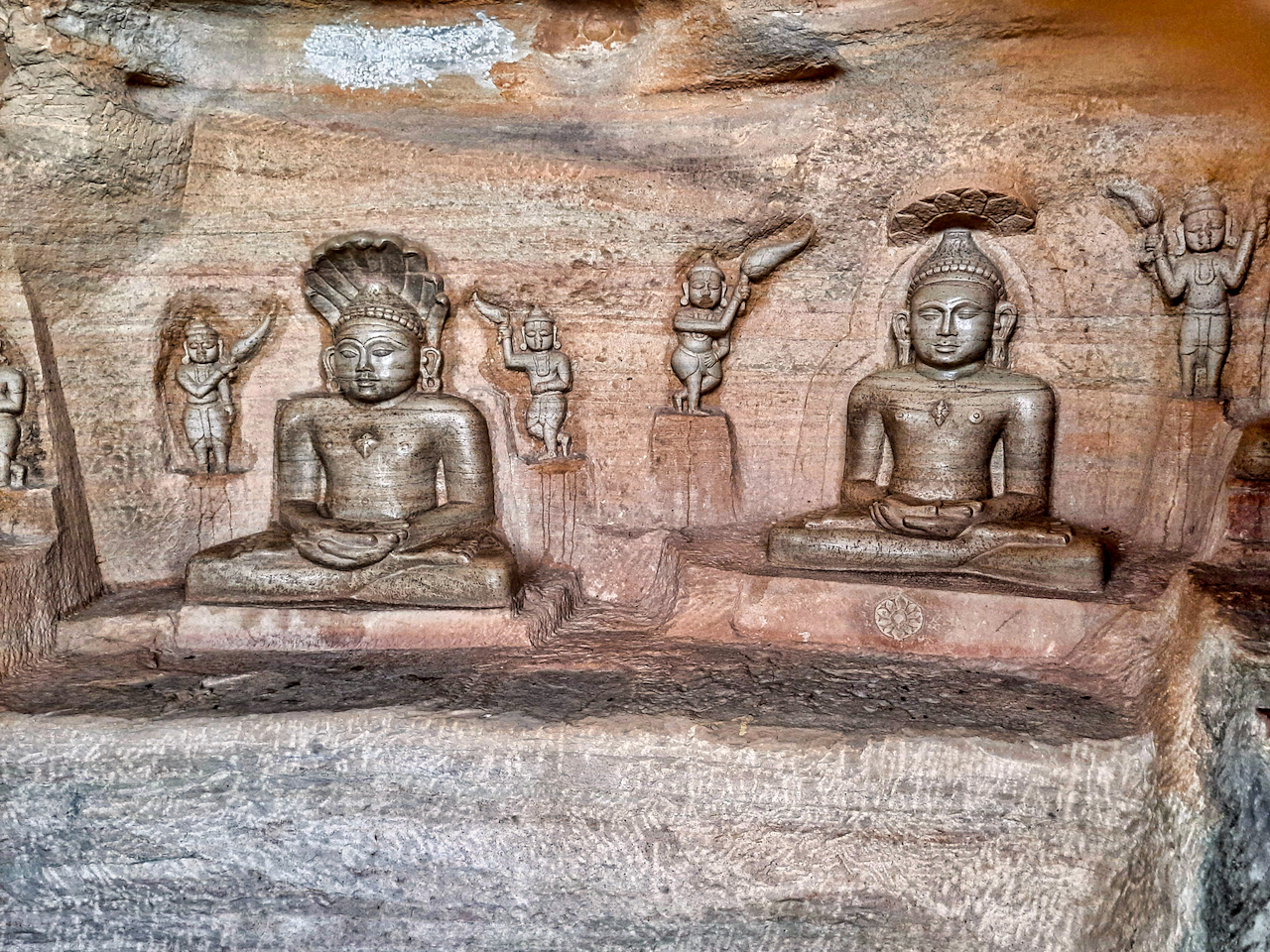
Parshavantha and Shitalnatha

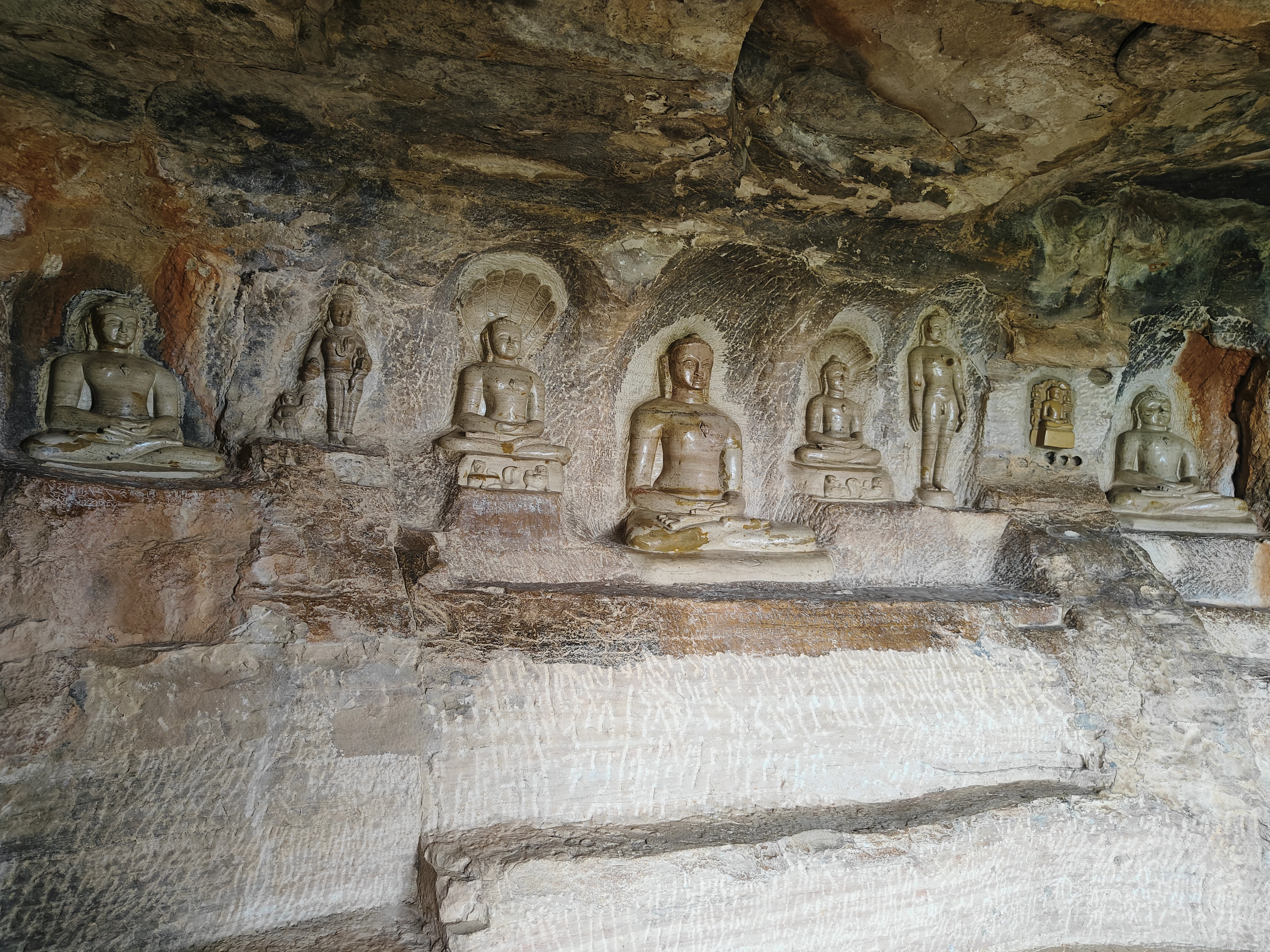
Tirthankar

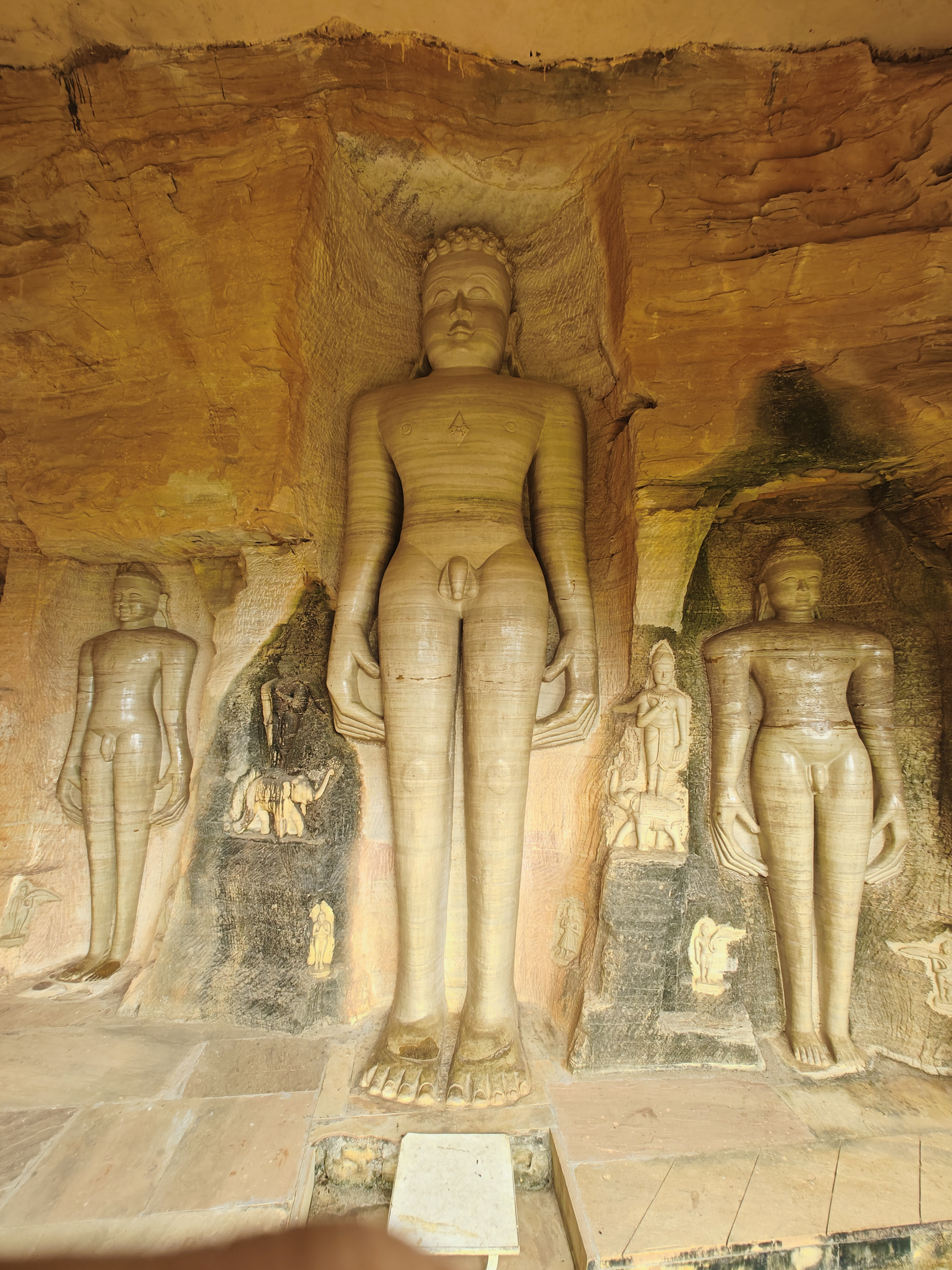
Tirthankar

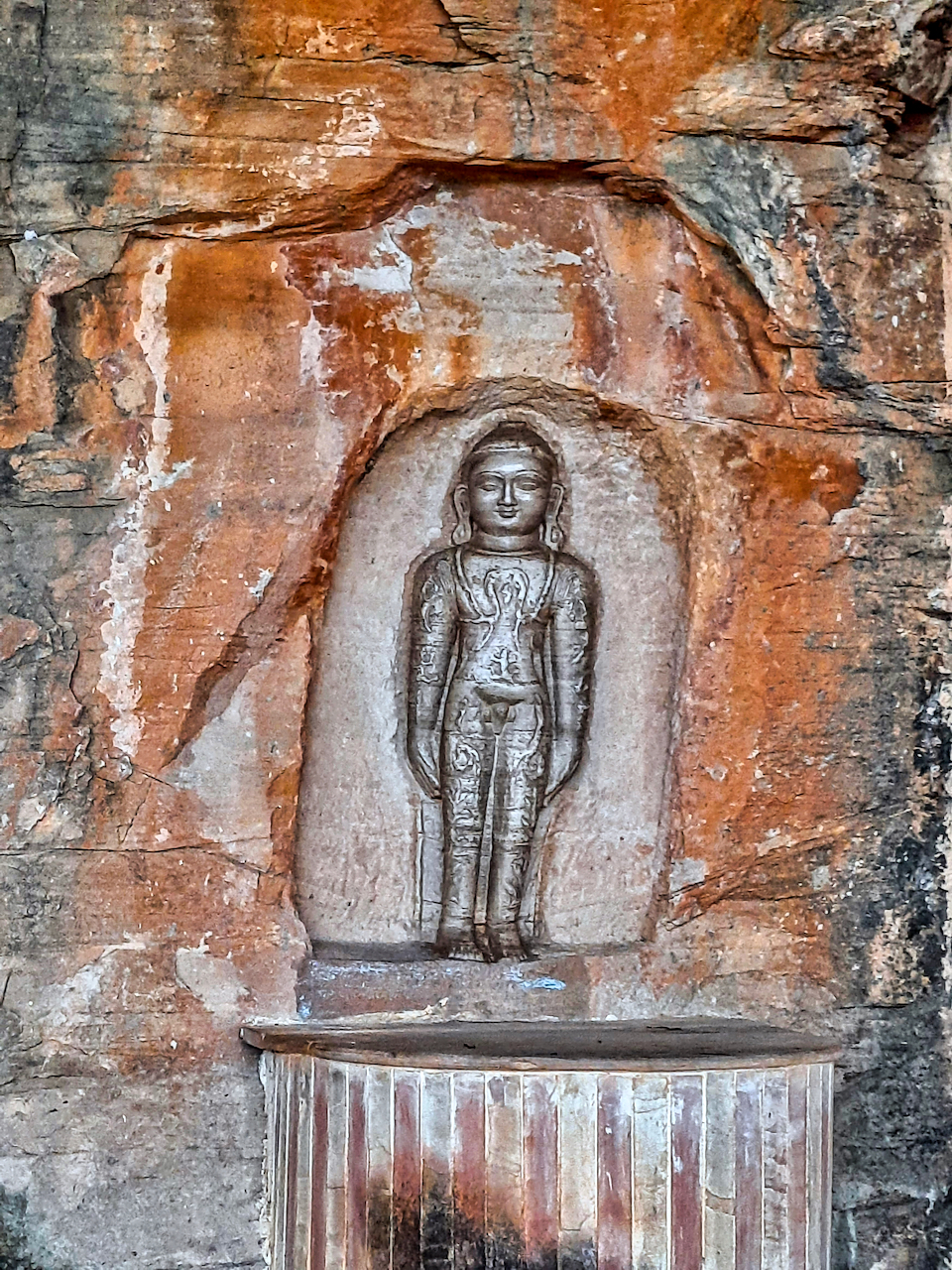
Bahubali

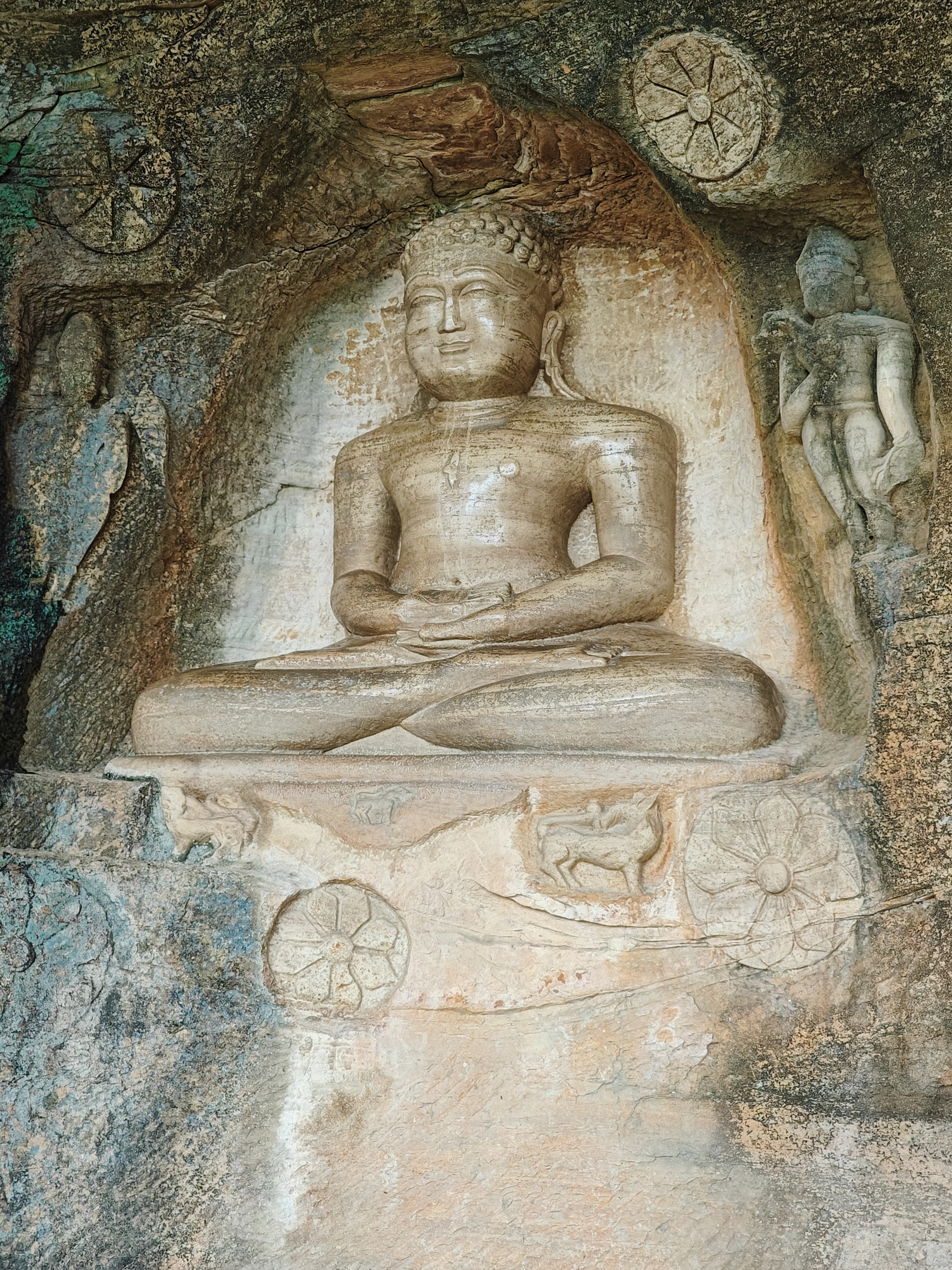
Shitalnatha

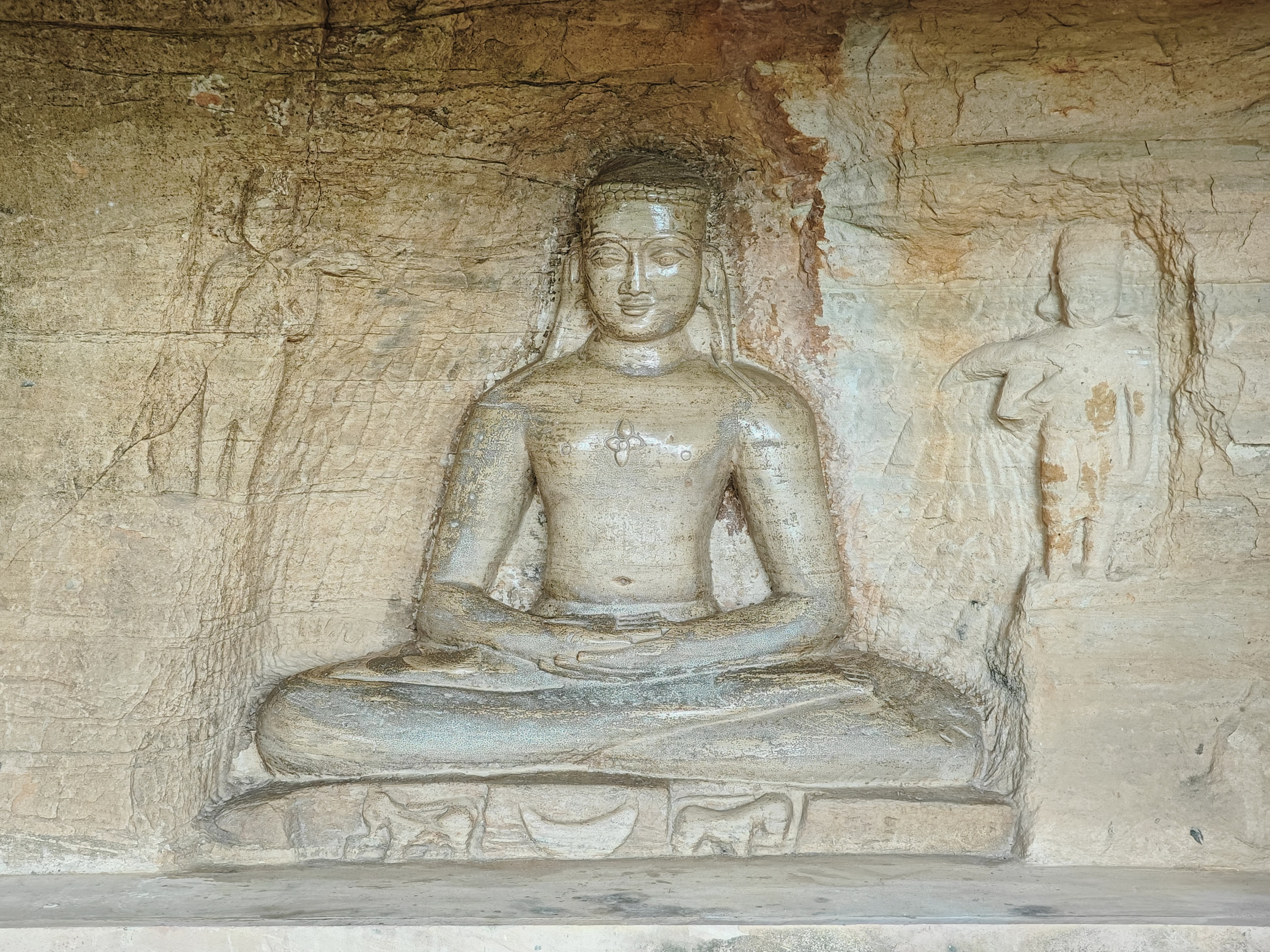
Chandraprabha

== See also ==
- Gopachal rock-cut Jain monuments
- Siddhachal Caves, Gwalior Fort
