= Siddhachal Caves =

Historical Indian caves

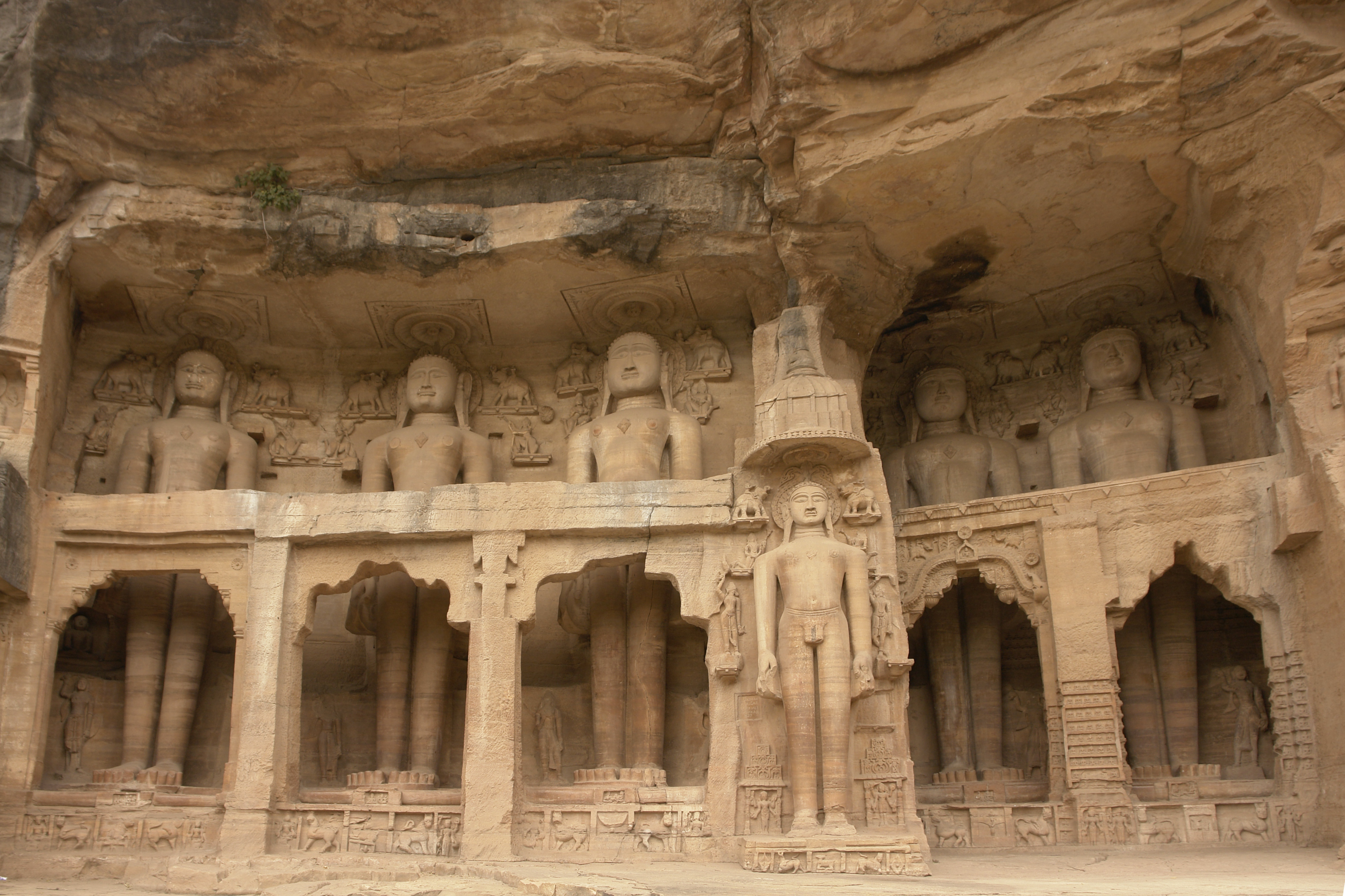
- Colossal Jain statues in Gwalior

- Location within India Location within Madhya Pradesh

Religion
- Affiliation: Jainism
- Sect: Digambara
- District: Gwalior
- Deity: Tīrthaṅkaras

Location
- Location: Gwalior Fort
- State: Madhya Pradesh
- Country: India
- Coordinates: 26°13′26.3″N 78°09′54.6″E

Architecture
- Style: Jainism
- Creator: Tomaras
- Established: 14th century
- Completed: 15th century

Siddhachal Caves or Siddhanchal Jain Collosi are Jain cave monuments and colossal carved into the rock face inside the Urvahi Gate of the Gwalior Fort in Gwalior, India. There are the most visited among the five groups of Jain rock carvings in the Gwalior Fort hill. They were built over time starting in the 14th-century, but most are dated to the 15th-century CE. Many of the statues were defaced and destroyed under the orders of the Muslim Emperor Babur of the Mughal dynasty in the 16th century, while a few repaired and restored after the fall of the Mughal dynasty and through the late 19th century by Scindia dynasty and Jain community.

The statues depict all 24 Tirthankaras. They are shown in both seated Padmasana posture as well as standing Kayotsarga posture, in the typical naked form of Jain iconography. The reliefs behind some of them narrate scenes from the Jain legends. The site is about 2 kilometres (1.2 mi) from the South-East Group of Gopachal rock cut Jain monuments and about 1 kilometre (0.62 mi) northwest of the Teli Temple within the Gwalior Fort.

The Siddhachal Jain collosi cave temple is one of the Archaeological Survey of India's Adarsh Smarak Monument along with other monuments in the Gwalior Fort.

== Location ==
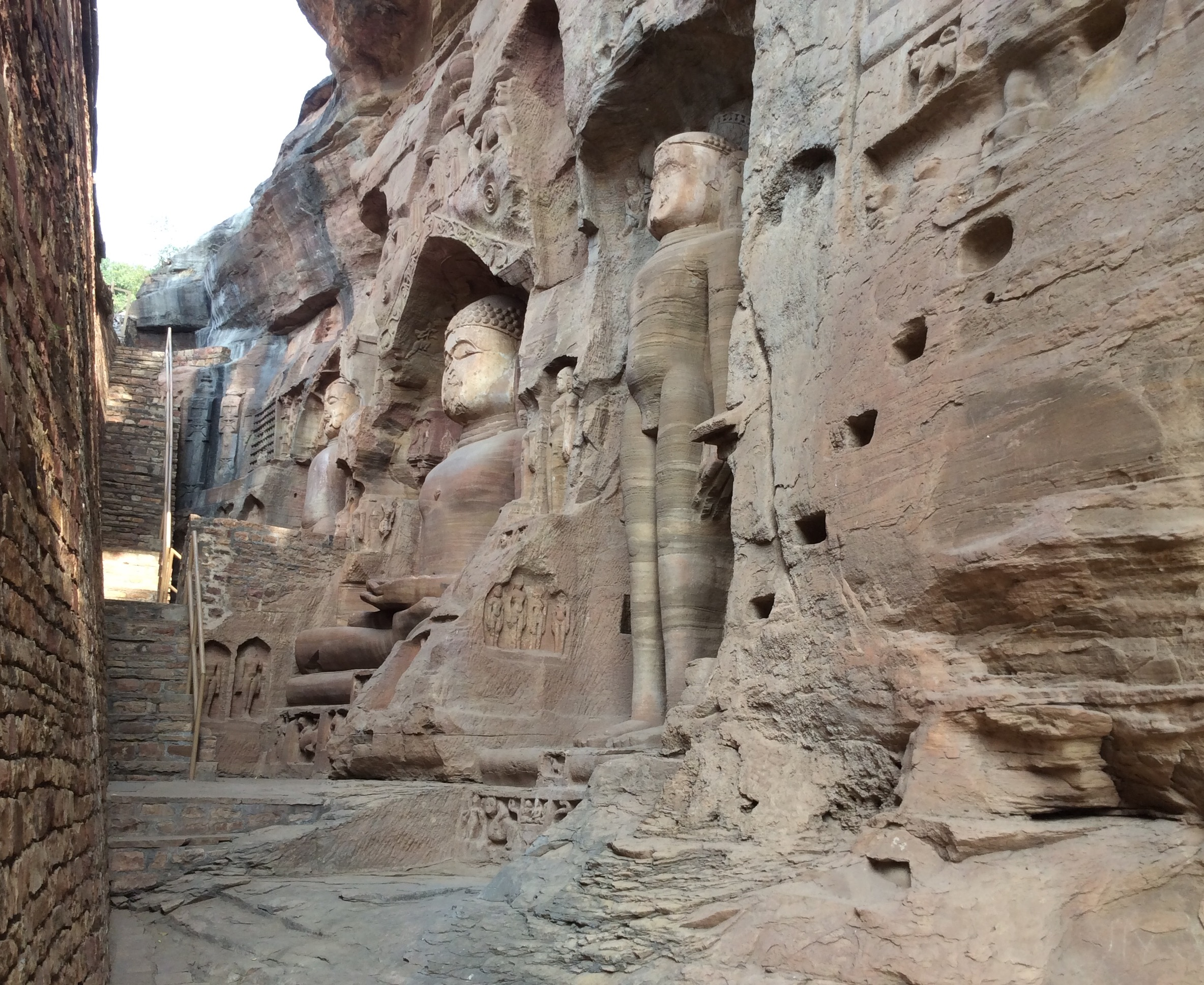
Jain statues at Siddhachal

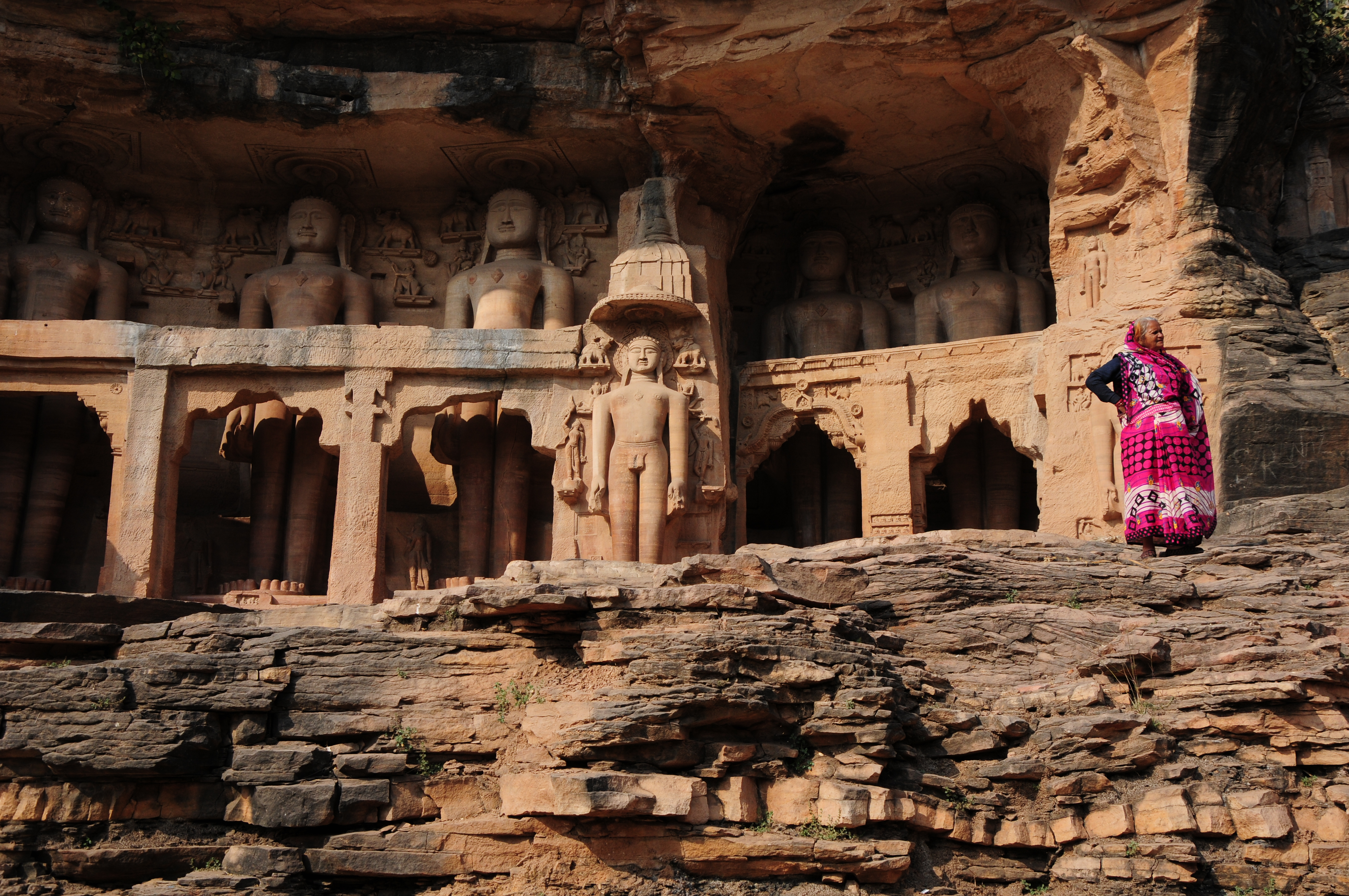
Meditating Jinas

The Siddhachal collosi cave temples are located inside fortifications of the Urvahi valley, a part of the fort of Gwalior, Madhya Pradesh, immediately below the northwestern walls of the fortress. The Gwalior city and the fort is connected to other Indian cities by major highways NH 44 and 46 (Asian Highway 43 and 47), Gwalior junction railway station and Rajmata Vijayaraje Scindia Airport (IATA: GWL). It is located near other historic Hindu and Jain temples from the medieval era.

== History ==
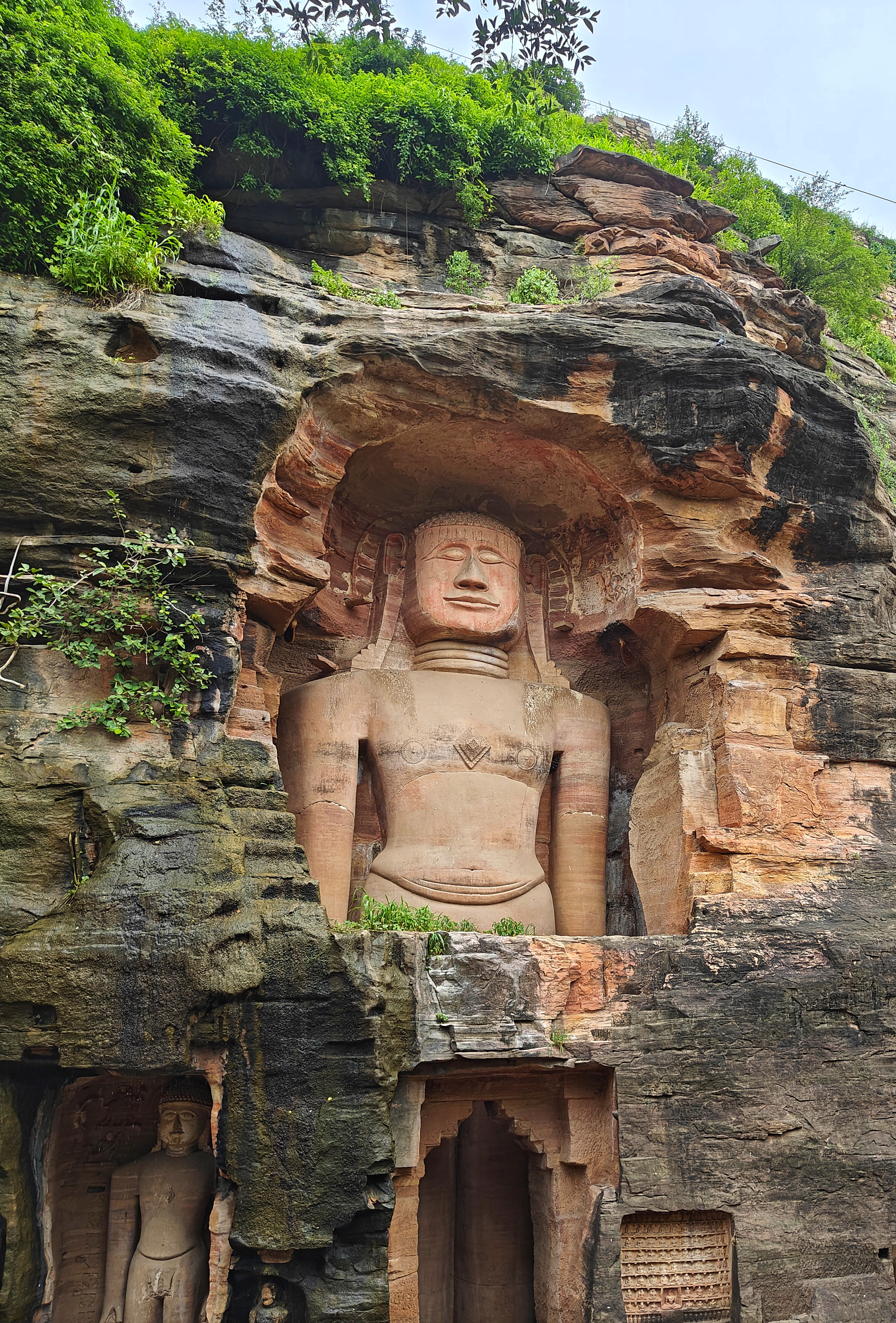
58.4 feet (17.8 m) statue of Rishabhanatha

The Siddhachal cave temples are a part of nearly 100 Jain monuments found in and around the Gwalior Fort, all dated to be from the 14th to 15th centuries. The Siddhanchal colossi are near the Urwahi road, and most are dated to be from the 15th century, built in an era when Delhi Sultanate had collapsed and fragmented, a Hindu kingdom was back in power in Gwalior region and before Babur had ended the Delhi Sultanate and replaced it with his Mughal dynasty. The inscriptions found near the monuments credit them to the Tomar kings, and they range from the 1440 to 1453 CE. The Siddhachal Caves were complete by about 1473 CE. Some 60 years after they had been completed, the statues were defaced and desecrated around 1527 when the Emperor Babur ordered their destruction. Babur explained in a memoir,

They have hewn the solid rock of the Adwa [Urwa], and sculptured out of it idols of larger and smaller size. On the south part of it is a large idol, which may be about 20 gaz (40 feet in height). These figures are perfectly naked, without even a rag to cover the parts of generation. Adwa is far from being a mean place, on the contrary it is extremely pleasant. The greatest fault consists in the idol figures all about it: I directed these idols to be destroyed.

The Jain cave temples within the Gwalior Fort were, however, not destroyed, just mutilated by chopping off the faces, the sexual organs and their limbs. Centuries later, the Jain community restored many of the statues by adding back stucco heads on the top of the damaged idols.

== Description ==
The Siddhachal Caves are rock-cut monuments with Jain collosi. They are found on both sides of the slope of the Urwahi road in the fort, along the Urwahi valley. The monuments include many caves, small reliefs on the walls, as well as 22 colossi. The largest of these are for Rishabhanatha (Adinatha), identifiable by the bull emblem carved on the pedestal under his foot, with a height of 57 feet (17 m). Other colossi include a seated 30 feet (9.1 m) Neminatha (shell icon on his pedestal), Parshvanatha with serpent cover over his head and Mahavira (lion icon on his pedestal).

== Gallery ==
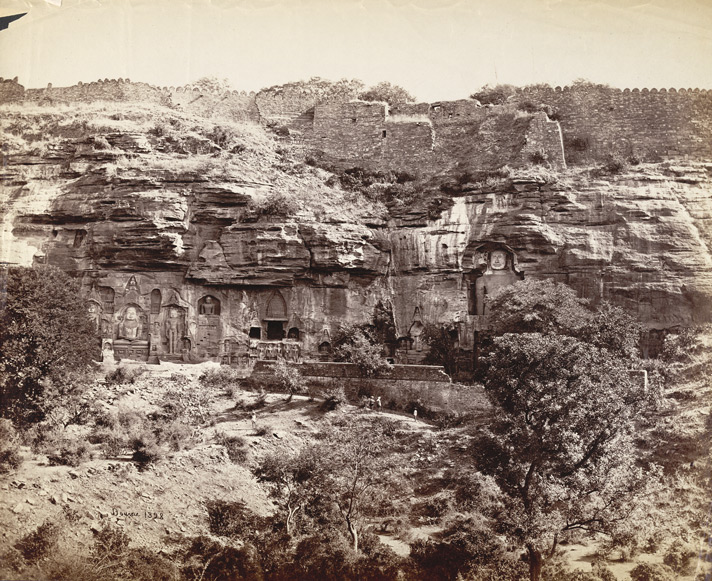
View of the caves below the fort in 1885

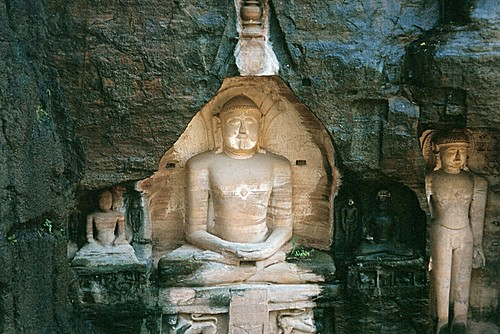
Jain Temple Fort Gwalior

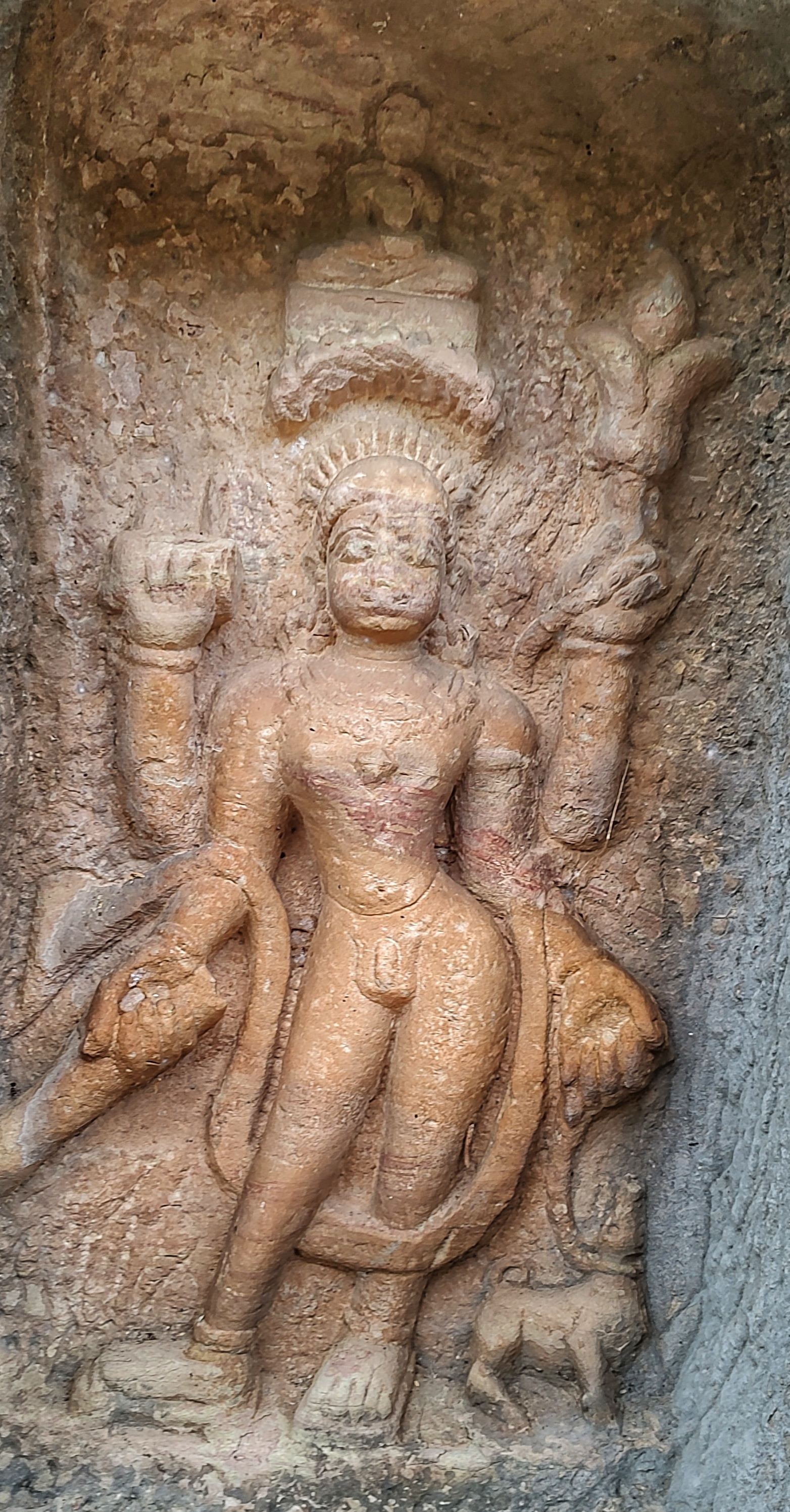
Jain Goddess

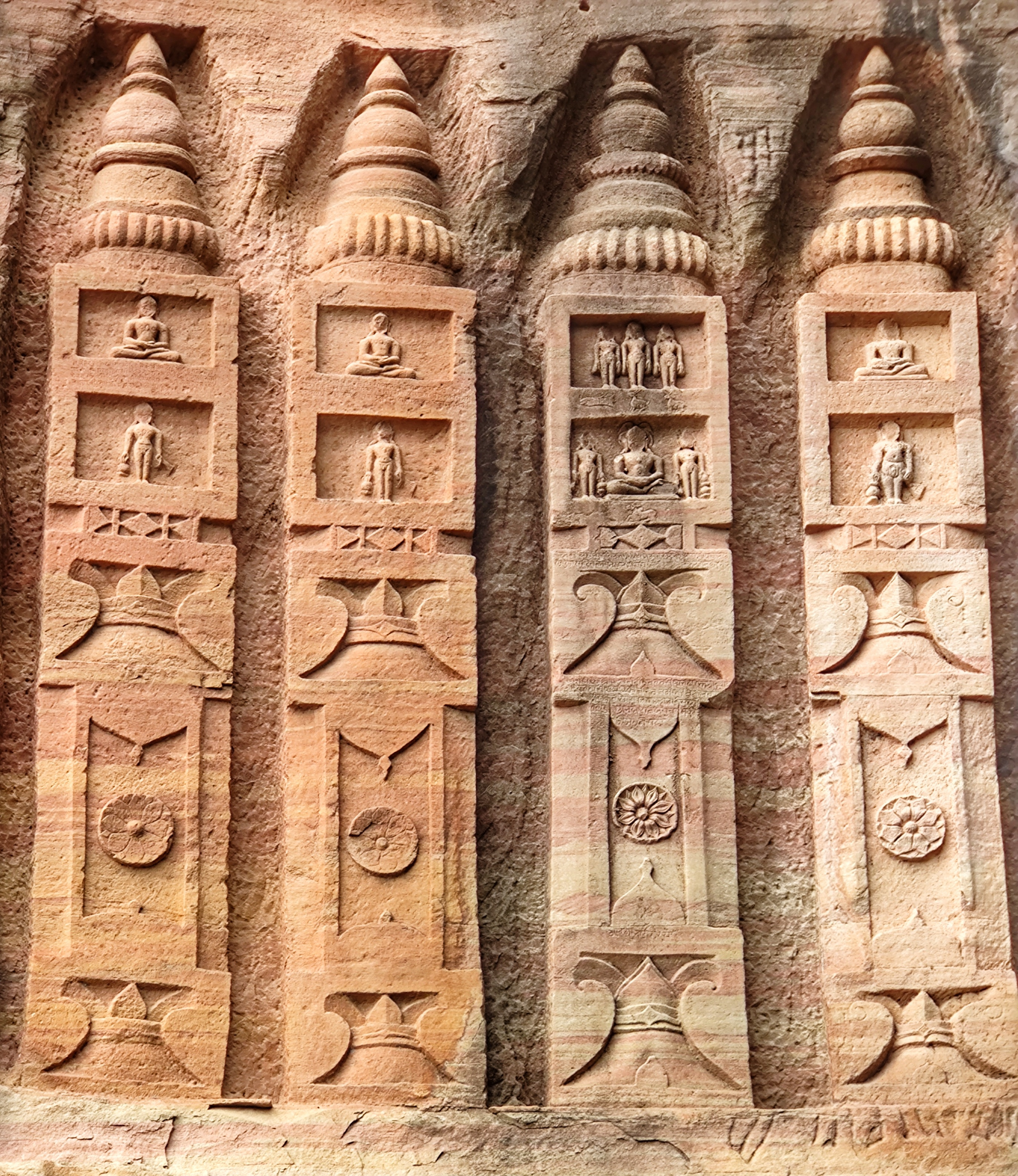
Panel with Arihant

== See also ==
- Gwalior Fort
- Mewar
- Gopachal rock cut Jain monuments
- Khandargiri Jain Caves
