= Gopachal rock-cut Jain monuments =

Rock-cut Jain reliefs in Madhya Pradesh, India

Gopachal Parvat Gopachal Rock-Cut Jain Monuments Gopachal Jain Colossi
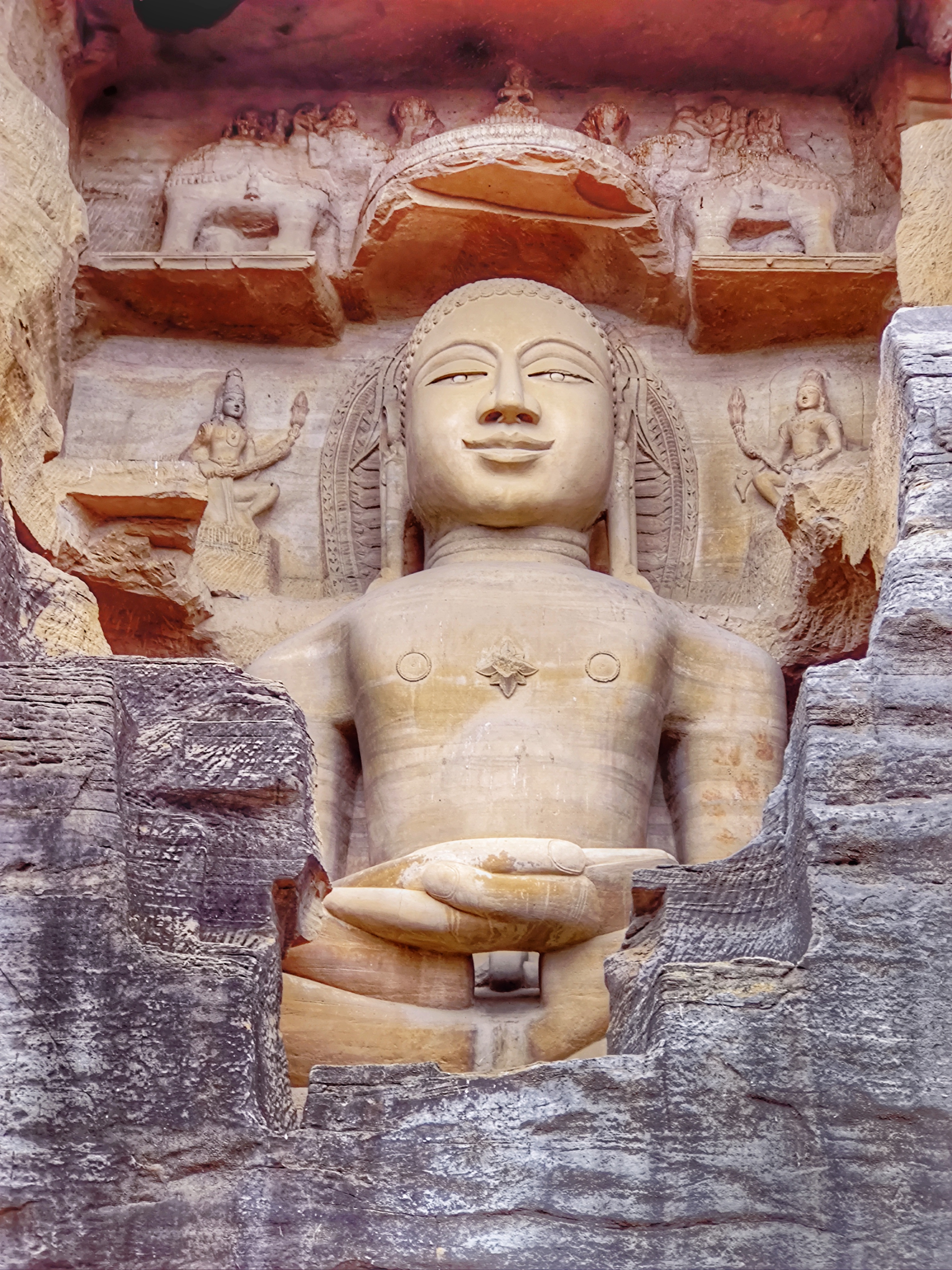
- Carving of a Tirthankar

- Location within Madhya Pradesh

Religion
- Affiliation: Jainism
- Sect: Digambara
- District: Gwalior
- Deity: Tīrthaṅkaras

Location
- Location: Gwalior Fort
- State: Madhya Pradesh
- Country: India
- Coordinates: 26°12′55.1″N 78°10′02.9″E

Architecture
- Style: Jainism
- Creator: Tomaras
- Established: 14th century (Dungar Singh Tomar)
- Completed: 1480 (15th century) (Kirti Singh Tomar)

The Gopachal Rock-Cut Jain Monuments, or Gopachal Jain Colossi, also called Gop Parvat Jaina Monuments, are a group of gigantic and large proportionate Jain rock-cut carvings dated to between the 14th and 15th centuries. They are located around the walls of the Gwalior Fort, Madhya Pradesh. They depict Tirthankaras in seated Padmasana posture as well as standing Kayotsarga posture, in the typical naked form of Jain iconography.

The number of Jain rock shrines at Gwalior, with numerous monumental statues, is unmatched anywhere else. James Burgess wrote: "In the 15th century, during the reign of the Tomar kings, the Jains seem to have been seized with an uncontrollable impulse to convert the cliff that sustains the fort into a great shrine in honour of their religion, and in a few years excavated the most extensive series of Jaina caves known to exist anywhere."

The Gopachal Jain Collosi is one of the Archaeological Survey of India's Adarsh Smarak Monument along with other monuments in the Gwalior Fort.

== Location ==
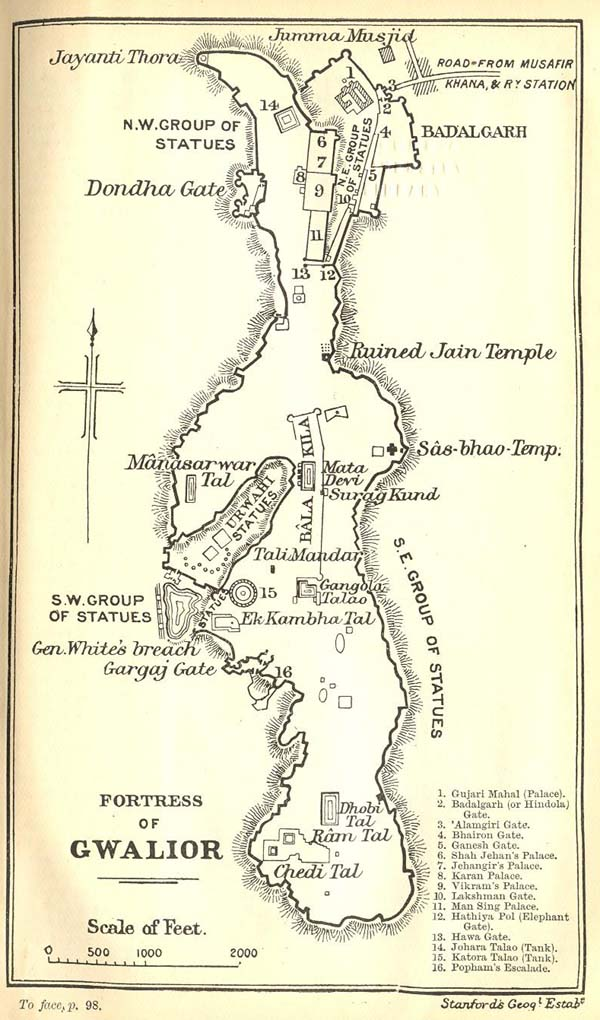
Gwalior Fort plan 1901 showing locations of the five groups of monuments

The Gopachal rock-cut Jain monuments are located on the rock cliffs of the hill topped by the Gwalior Fort, Madhya Pradesh. Gopgiri or Gop Parvat is the old designation of the Gwalior Fort.

There are five clusters of monuments that surround the hill, as can be seen in the 1901 map.

- South-East Group: Popularly referred to as Ek Patthar Ki Bawadi group, the cluster is now termed the "Gopachal Siddha Kshetra" by the local Jain community. The group includes 26 caves in a row spanning about half a mile. There are 13 inscriptions from 1468-1473 AD. The entrance to the site is close to the Dindayal City Mall.
- South-West Group: Now termed Trishalagiri. The group is the first one encountered when driving to the Urvai Gate, just outside the fortifications. There are the oldest Jain monuments in Gwalior from the post-Gupta period. Archaeologist L.B. Singh dates them to 6th to 8th cent AD.
- Urvahi group: In both sides of the road, just before entering the hilltop fort gate. These are the most visited since they are visible from the road itself. There are six inscriptions from 1440–1453.
- North-West group: Now termed Naminath Giri group after Lord Naminath. They are hard to access. There is an inscription of 1470. The group appears to have escaped the destruction by Babur, and thus the monumental image of Lord Naminath is in its pristine form.
- North-East group: Now termed Naimgir group after Lord Neminath.

Alexander Cunningham noted a Jain temple converted into a mosque just north of the Sas-Bahu temples in the fort containing a Jain inscription of AD 1108. Also within the fort there is an abandoned Jain temple which is now within the Scindia School playground and thus no longer accessible. Several large Jain sculptures are placed within the Teli ka Mandir compound.

The Gwalior city and the fort is connected to other Indian cities by major highways NH 44 and 46 (Asian Highway 43 and 47), a railway station and airport (IATA: GWL). It is located near other historic Hindu and Jain temples from the medieval era.

== History ==
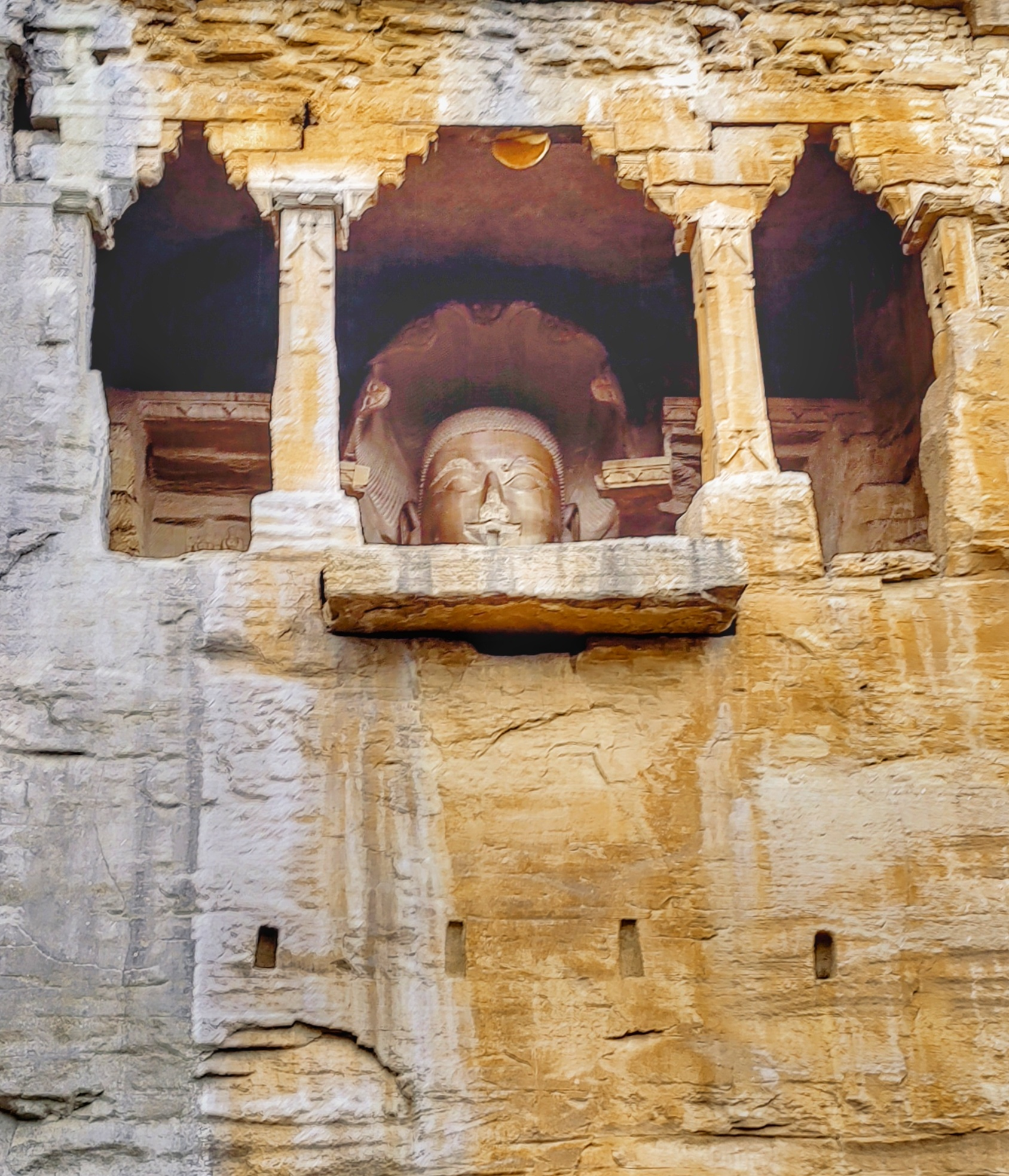
The cave temple housing 47 feet (14 m) idol of Parshvanatha

The Gopachal rock-cut monuments are a part of nearly 100 Jain monuments found in and around the Gwalior city, but these are dated earlier than the Siddhachal Caves located about 2 kilometres (1.2 mi) north of these monuments. Both monuments were defaced and desecrated around 1527 when the Emperor Babur ordered their destruction., Quote: "In 1527, the Urvahi Jinas were mutilated by the Mughal emperor Babar, a fact he records in his memoirs". Centuries later, the Jain community restored many of the statues by adding back stucco heads on the top of the damaged idols.

The prolific Apabhramsha author Raidhu was responsible for consecrating many of the Jain rock carved images as attested by multiple inscriptions. These include the two colossal images of Shri Adinatha (57 feet) and Shri Chandraprabhu.

Qutb ud-Din Aibak captured the fort from Pratihara in 1196 and held it until his death in 1210. Altmash captured the fort in 1232 and built the fortifications at the Urvahi gate. The Tomars acquired control in 1394 and held it until 1517.

Mughal Emperor Babur conquered Gwalior in AD 1527. Babar ordered the destruction of the Jain statues, as he mentions in his memoirs. The heads of the statues at Urvahi gate and the Ek Patthat ki Bawadi were damaged. The Urvahi gate sculptures were repaired at some later time by the local Jains. The South-West Group and North West group sculptures survived because they were in inconspicuous and hard to reach places and the Mughals kept control until Muhammad Shah. Scindias, took control in 1731. Shortly before that, Jain temples were constructed again in Gwalior city in 1704, including the Jain Golden Temple, Gwalior.

== Description ==
The Gopachal rock-cut monuments depict the Tirthankaras in seated or standing meditating positions. They are not as colossal as some of those found in the Siddhachal Caves, but they are big. The Gopachal monuments include standing and seated Shri Rishabhanatha (Adinatha), Neminatha, Parshvanatha and Shri Mahavirasvami.

The mulnayak of the complex is a 47 feet (14 m) idol of Parshvanatha, the largest idol of Parshvanatha in lotus position. According to Jains, Tirthankara Parshvanath delivered his discourse (deshna) on this hill.

== Gallery ==
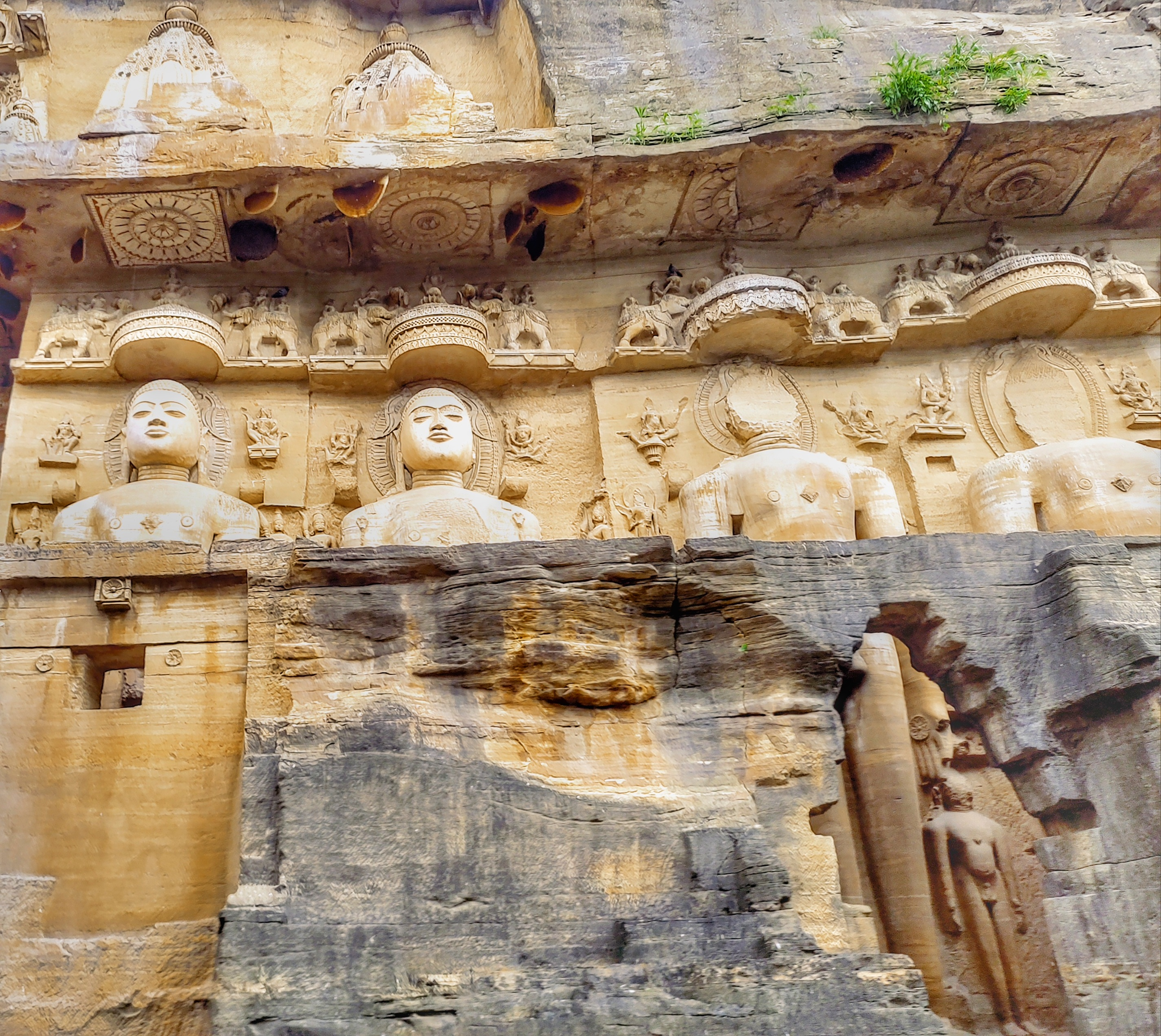
Jain Tirthankar statues, Ek Pathar ki Bavadi

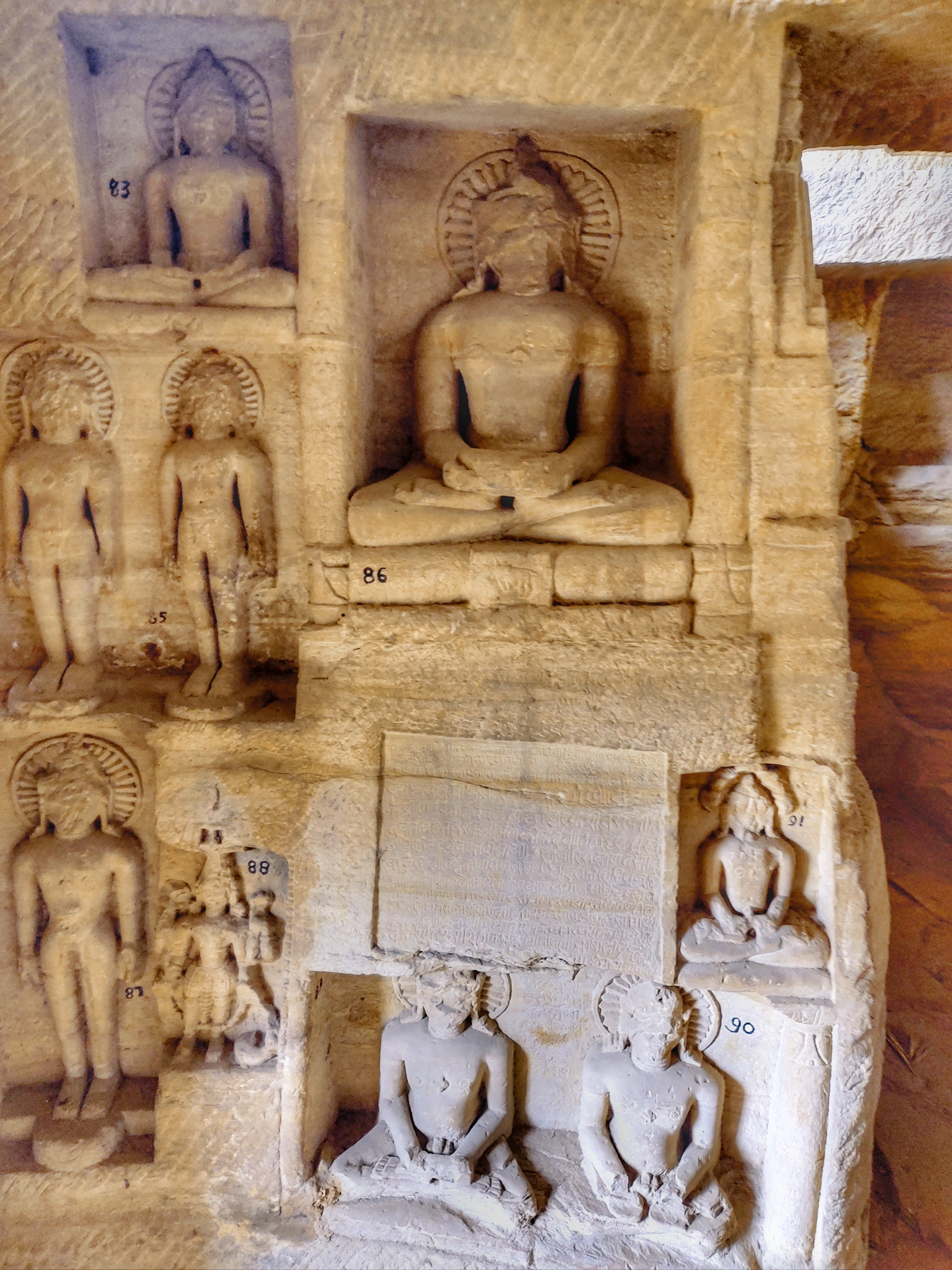
Seated in lotus position

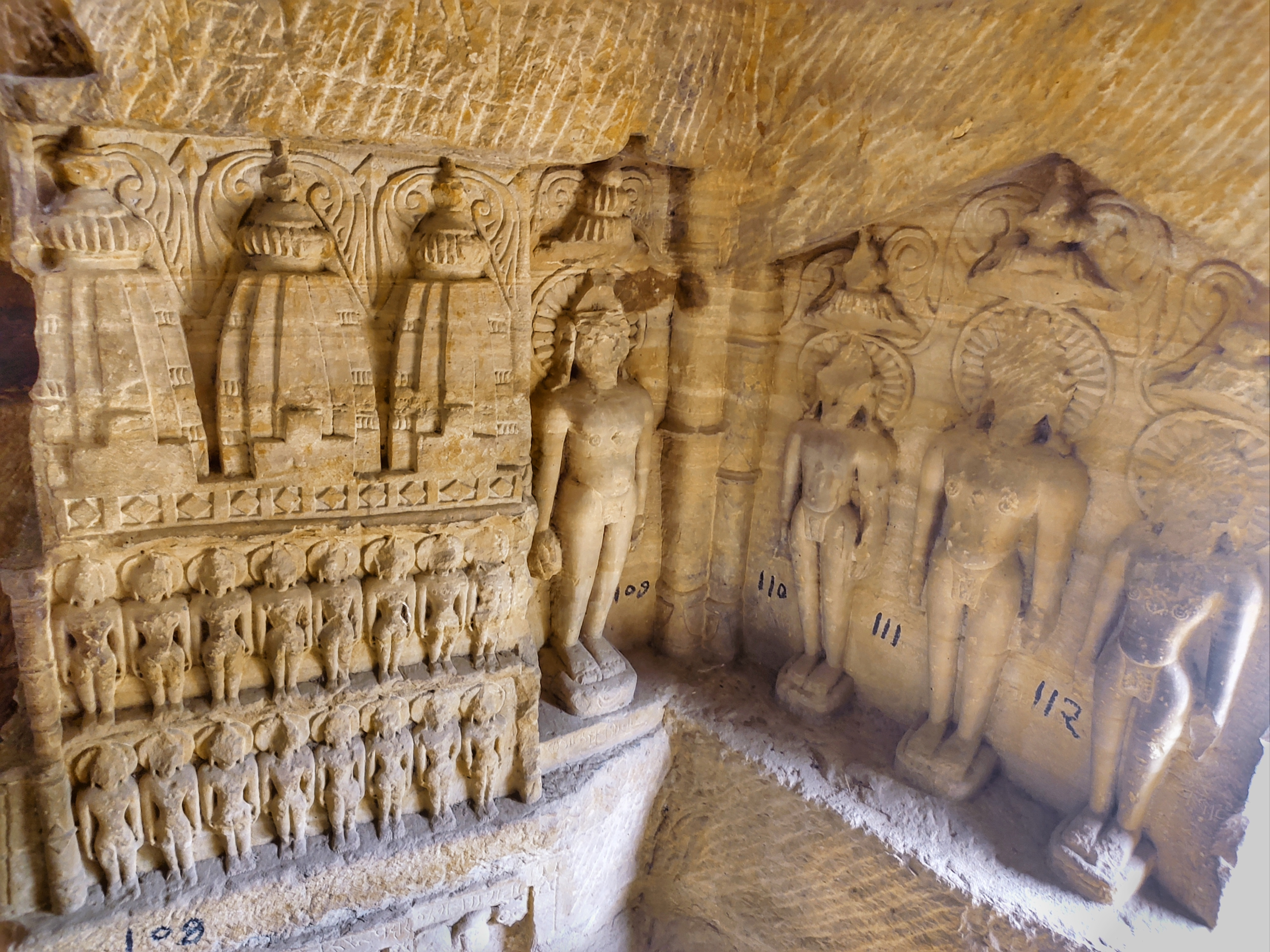
Seated in kayotsarga position

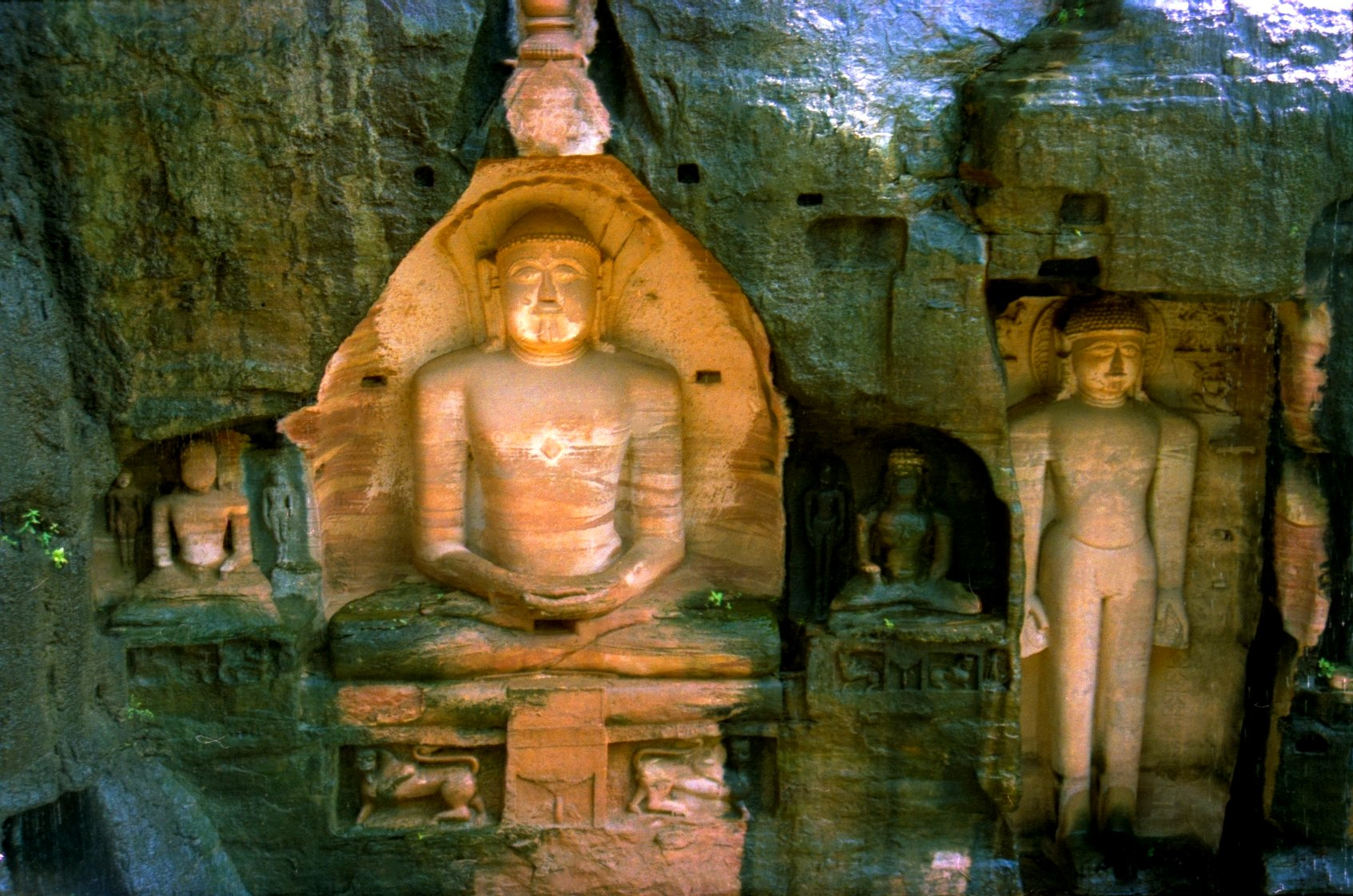
Parshvanatha

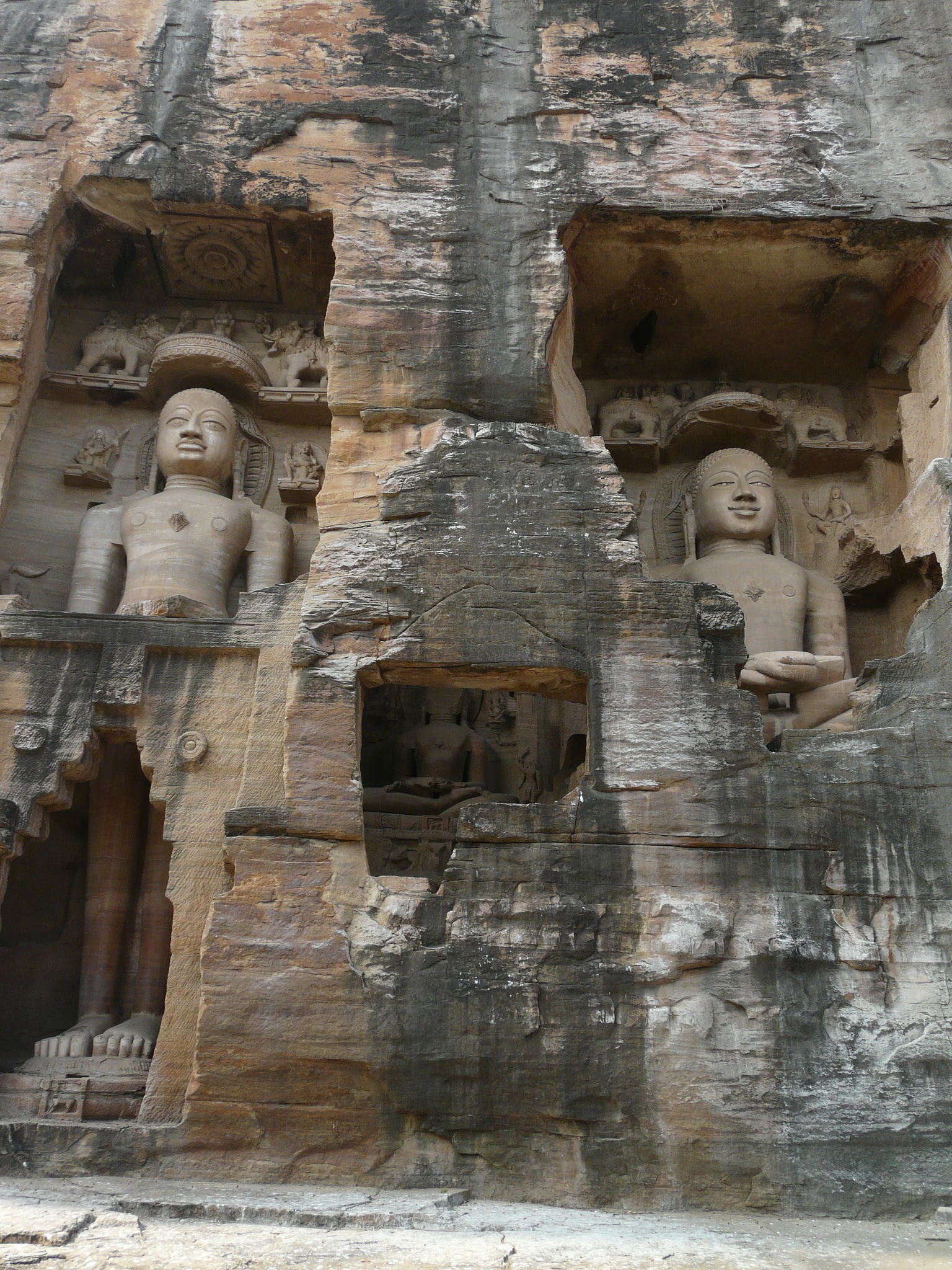
Jain Tirthankar statues, Ek Pathar ki Bavadi

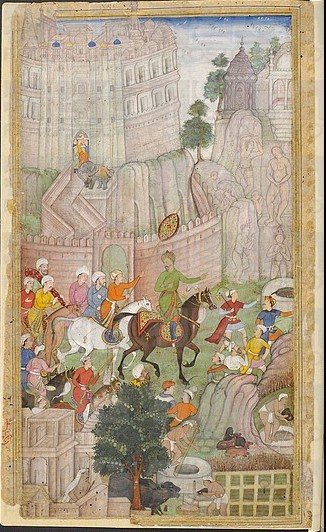
Babur visiting the Urvah valley in Gwalior, from an illustrated Baburnama, showing the carvings

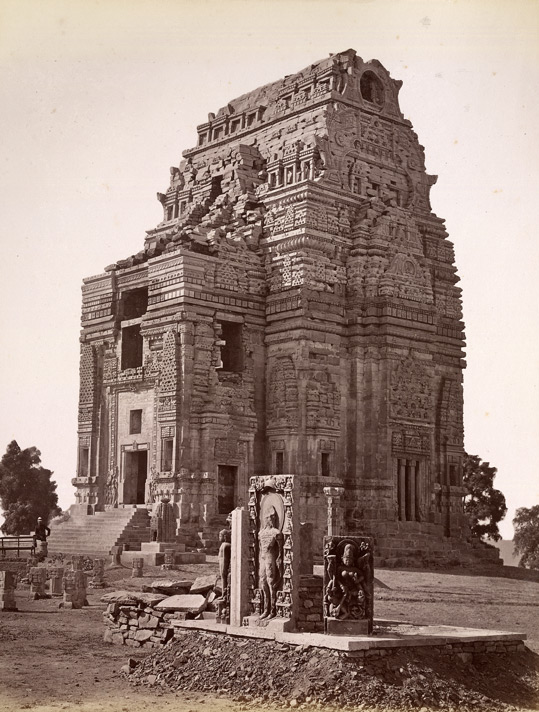
Jain statues in Teli ka Mandir compound, Lala Deen Dayal in 1882

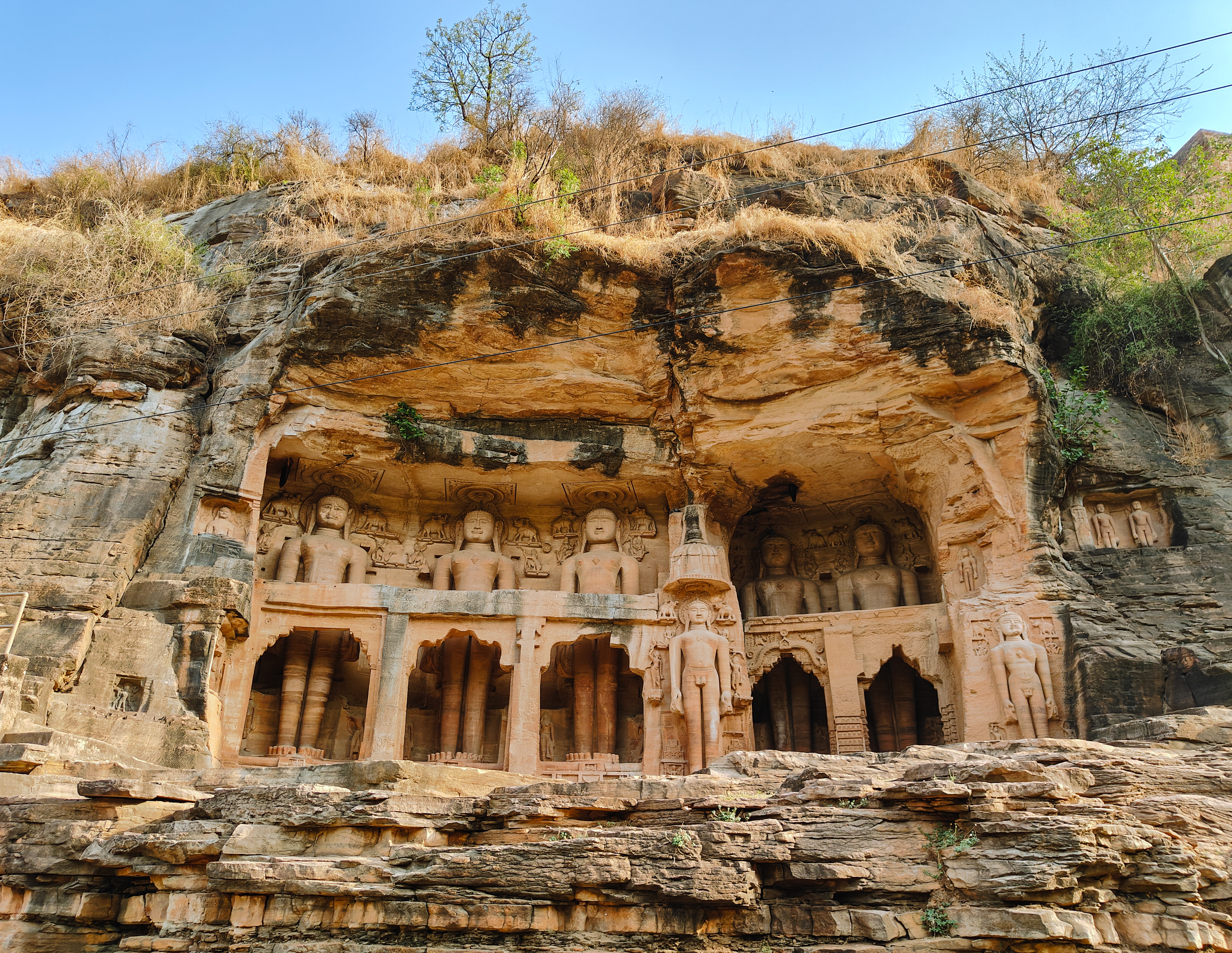
Jain Tirthankar Statues

== Transport ==
The nearest airport is Gwalior.

== See also ==
- Jain art
- List of colossal sculptures in situ
- Gwalior
- Siddhachal Caves Gwalior Fort Urwahi Valley/Gate area
- Raidhu, the Gopachal Prathishacharya
