= Teli ka Mandir =

9th century Hindu temple in Gwalior

Teli Temple
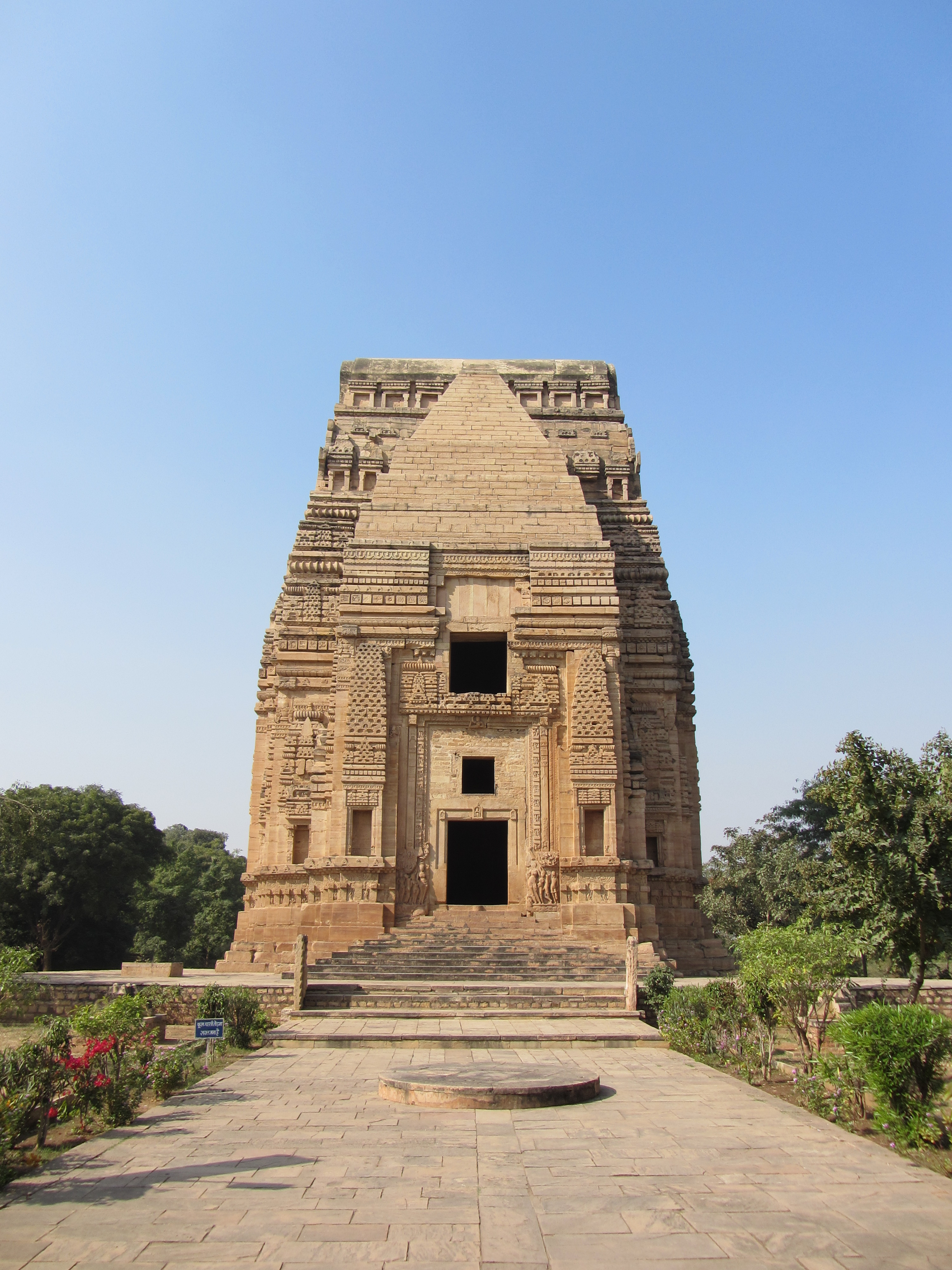
- Front view of the temple

- Location within India Location within Madhya Pradesh

Religion
- Affiliation: Hinduism
- District: Gwalior
- Deity: Shiva, Vishnu, others

Location
- Location: Gwalior Fort
- State: Madhya Pradesh
- Country: India
- Interactive map of Teli Temple
- Coordinates: 26°13′15.2″N 78°09′53.6″E

Architecture
- Style: Nagara
- Completed: 8th or 9th-century

Teli Temple, also known as Teli ka Temple, is a Hindu temple located within the Gwalior Fort in Madhya Pradesh, India. Dedicated to Shiva, Vishnu and Matrikas, it has been variously dated between the early 8th and early 9th century CE.

It is an atypical design for a Hindu temple, as it has a rectangular sanctum instead of the typical square. It integrates the architectural elements of the Nagara style and the Valabhi prasada. The temple is based on a Gurjara Pratihara-Gopgiri style North Indian architecture.

The temple is a classic example of a design based on "musical harmonics" in architecture, one that Hermann Goetz called as a masterpiece of late Gupta era Indian art.

== Location ==
The temple is located inside the fort of Gwalior, north Madhya Pradesh. The city is connected by major highways NH 44 and 46 (Asian Highway 43 and 47), a railway station and airport (IATA: GWL). It is located near other historic Hindu and Jain temples from the medieval era, as well the major group of Vaishnavism, Shaivism and Shakism temples such as the Bateshwar Temples near Morena with dozens of standing temples and the ruins of over 100 small pancharatha-style temples, the Naresar group with 22 temples, and the Mahua group of temples most of which are dated to between the 6th and 10th century. They exemplify various variations in the Nagara style of Hindu architecture as well as the application of vastu mandala symmetry principles in novel ways.

The Telika Mandir is one of the historic temples within the Gwalior old city. It is in the middle of the old town, built on a high point which makes it stand out from different locations within the fort. The site of the Teli ka Mandir and other historic temples is found in early inscriptions. Some of these refer to the town as Gopagiri.

== History ==
The Telika Mandir is generally dated to between 8th and 9th century based on paleography, art-style, architectural design and small inscriptions found within the temple premises. According to Michael Meister, an art historian and a professor specializing in Indian temple architecture, the temple was built by 750 CE, per the most recently discovered inscriptions in Gwalior. George Michell, another art historian and a professor specializing in Indian temples, the temple was complete by the 9th century. Bharne and Krusche place the temple between 700 and 750 CE, while Allen places it in the 8th century. According to Allen, some local literature states it to be from the 11th century, but the evidence suggests that this late chronology is inaccurate. According to Bajpai, the temple may have been built during the reign of the Gurjara-Pratihara Mihira Bhoja.

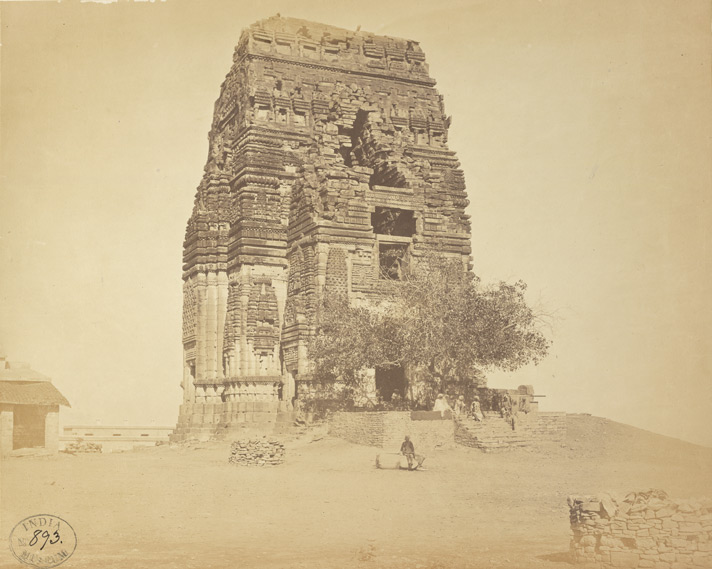
Teli ka Mandir before restoration (1869)

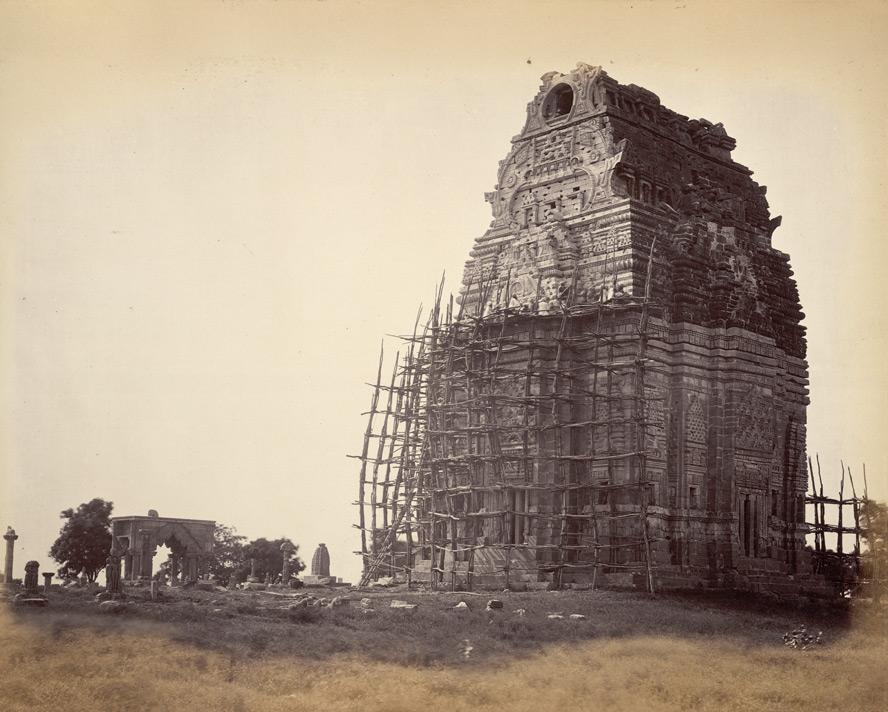
During restoration (1882)

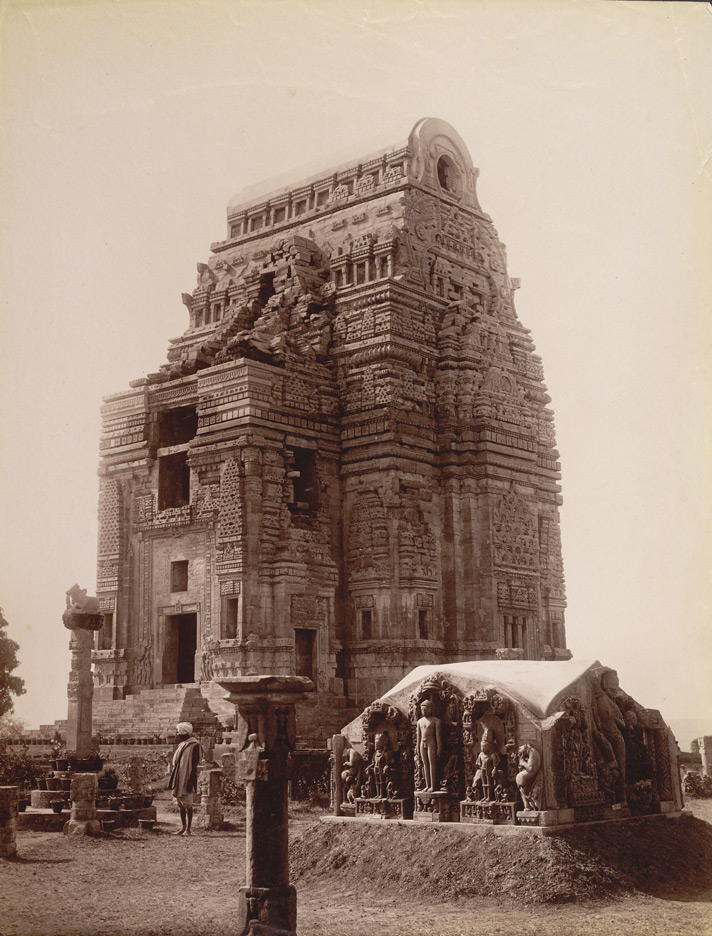
Restored (1885), sculpture garden added.

The temple shows signs of extensive damage and change. It was badly damaged in the plunder raids by Muslim army of Qutb-ud-din Aibak and his successor Iltutmish in 1232 CE along with other temples in the fort following a jauhar, parts of the ruins were then used to apparently build a mosque nearby. The mosque was in turn apparently destroyed by Hindu Maratha army centuries later. The temple was restored by the Hindus after the desecration by Iltutmish forces, which speculated Cunningham, may explain some of the features that appear from a later era. The temple has icons and inscriptions related to all three major traditions of Hinduism: Shaivism, Vaishnavism and Shaktism. One of the inscriptions, for example, is a metrical hymn about Durga. The relief work includes a prominent Garuda, the vahana of Vishnu. Inside the temple is a Shiva linga.

The temple was in ruins in the 19th century. Between 1881 and 1883, repairs to the temple were initiated by Major Keith, an officer of the Royal Scots Regiment stationed in Gwalior.

=== Nomenclature ===
The origin of the temple's name is unclear. It literally means Oilman's Temple, but neither the inscriptions nor texts attest to such a name. According to Allen, there is no satisfactory explanation for this name. Local folklore states that the temple was built by oil merchant caste rather than kings, the royal class or the priestly class.

== Description ==
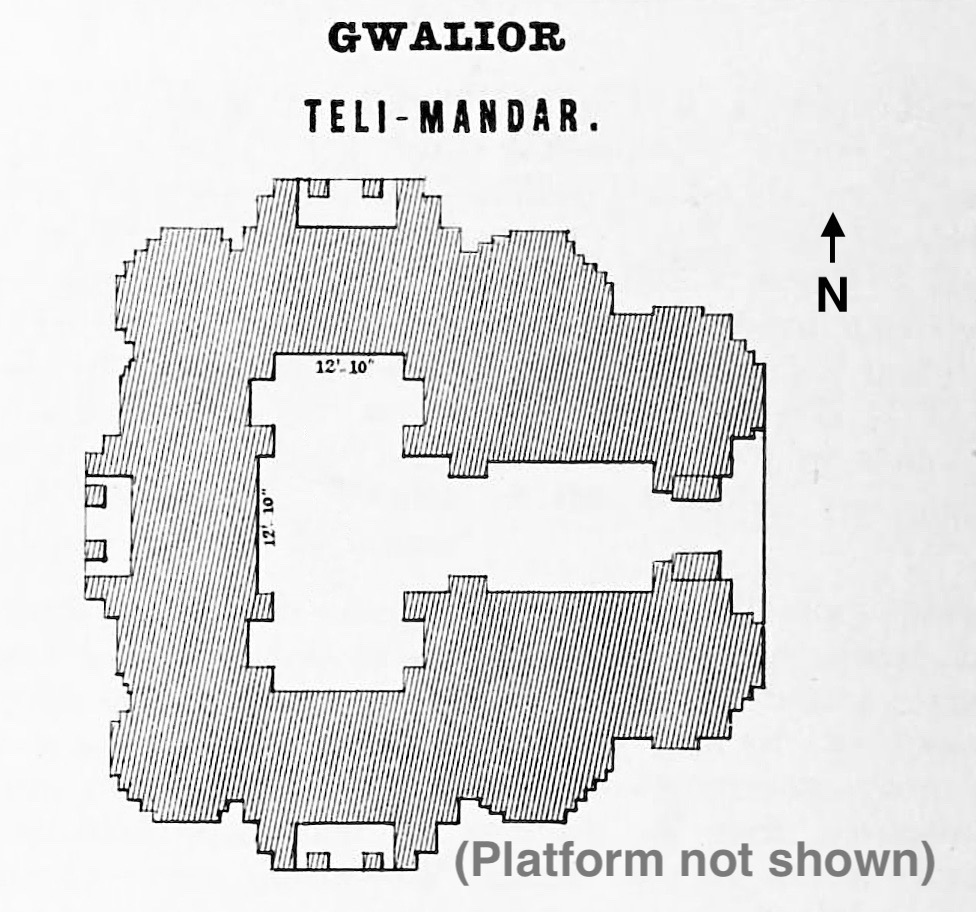
Teli ka mandir ground plan (incomplete).

The temple has a rectangular triratha sanctum plan that sits on a jagati platform that is a square of 60 feet (18 m). It has a large kapili projecting portico of about 11 feet (3.4 m) towards the east. The tower rises about the rectangular sanctum to a height of 80 feet (24 m). Above it is a barrel vault shaped cap of 30 feet (9.1 m), its length perpendicular to that of the sanctum, that reminds one of South Indian gopuram. It likely had amalaka, kalasha and other ornaments on top, but these are all lost to history. The walls of temple has numerous niches for statues, but it is all empty now and show signs of damage. The niches are topped by tall pediments. The outer dimensions of the sanctum are 60x40 feet with an 80 feet tower above.

The doorway into the temple is 35 feet (11 m) high, and it is ornate. Above the doorway is a relief of Garuda, the vahana of Vishnu. Inside, there is another doorway above which is a Ganesha relief. There is a Nandi and lingam inside in the sanctum. The temple entrance and panels have several inscriptions, three of which are short likely from pre-10th century and others are longer from 15th-century. The latter inscriptions suggest that the temple was a Shaiva shrine by the 15th century. One of the inscriptions discovered is a metrical hymn about Durga, which suggests a Shakta tradition influence. The temple lacks a covered mandapa, but includes a circumambulatory path. This path has four entrances, one from each cardinal direction which a devotee can use to enter the temple for a darshana.

The temple is approached through a flight of stairs leading to a banded doorway containing sculptures of river goddesses Ganga and Yamuna with their waists leaning towards the center, each with a boy and a girl on the lower part. Above them are amorous couples in various stages of courtship and intimacy (mithuna). There are male and female dvarapalas along the outer and inner doorways, both genders carrying weapons and a kind expression of welcome, and possibly symbolizing the theology in Shaiva and Shakta traditions. Above the river goddess flanked eastern doorway are piled up chaitya-hall style gavaksha ornamentation, which reminds one of the Buddhist designs. The doorway leads to the sanctum sanctorum or garbha griha. There is a decorative sculpture of Garuda at the entrance to the temple.

The temple's vallabhi shikhara mirrors the gopuram of Dravidian temples and it stands on a Nagara base. The temple's outer walls have been extensively carved.

== Analysis and reception ==
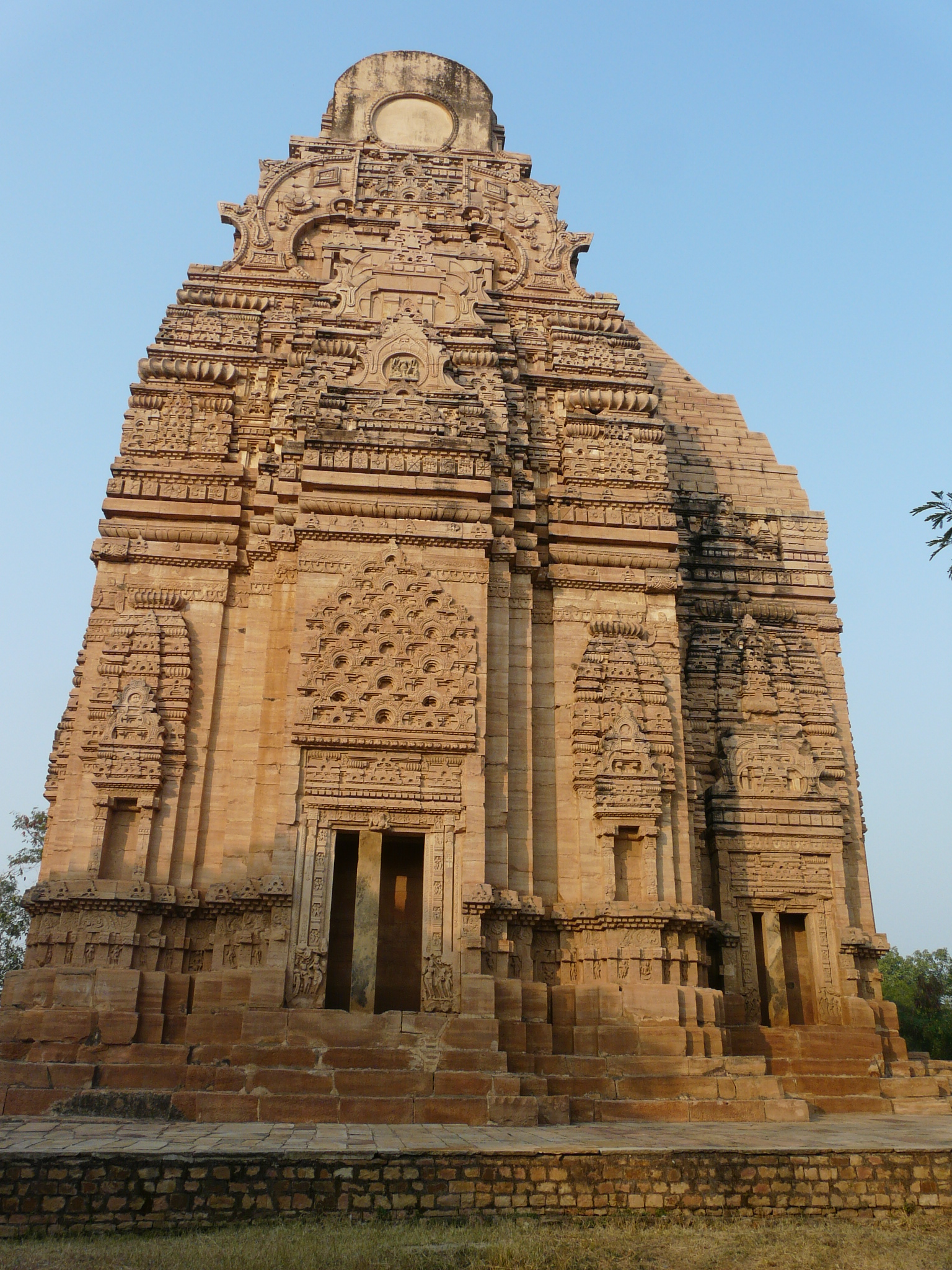
Side view of the Teli ka Mandir.

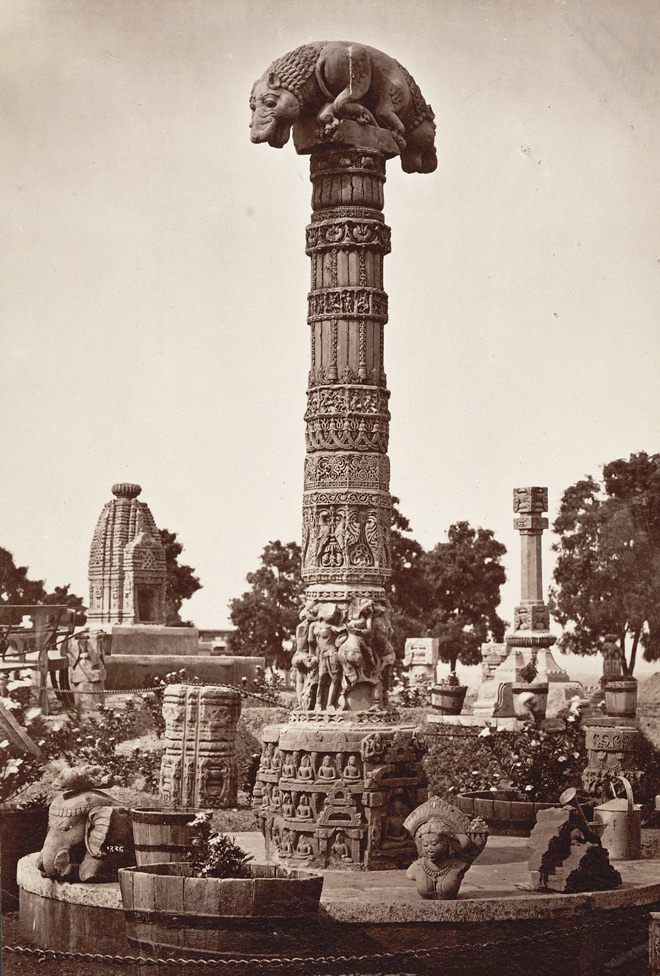
Vardhana-period sculptures near Teli ka Mandir, Gwalior Fort.

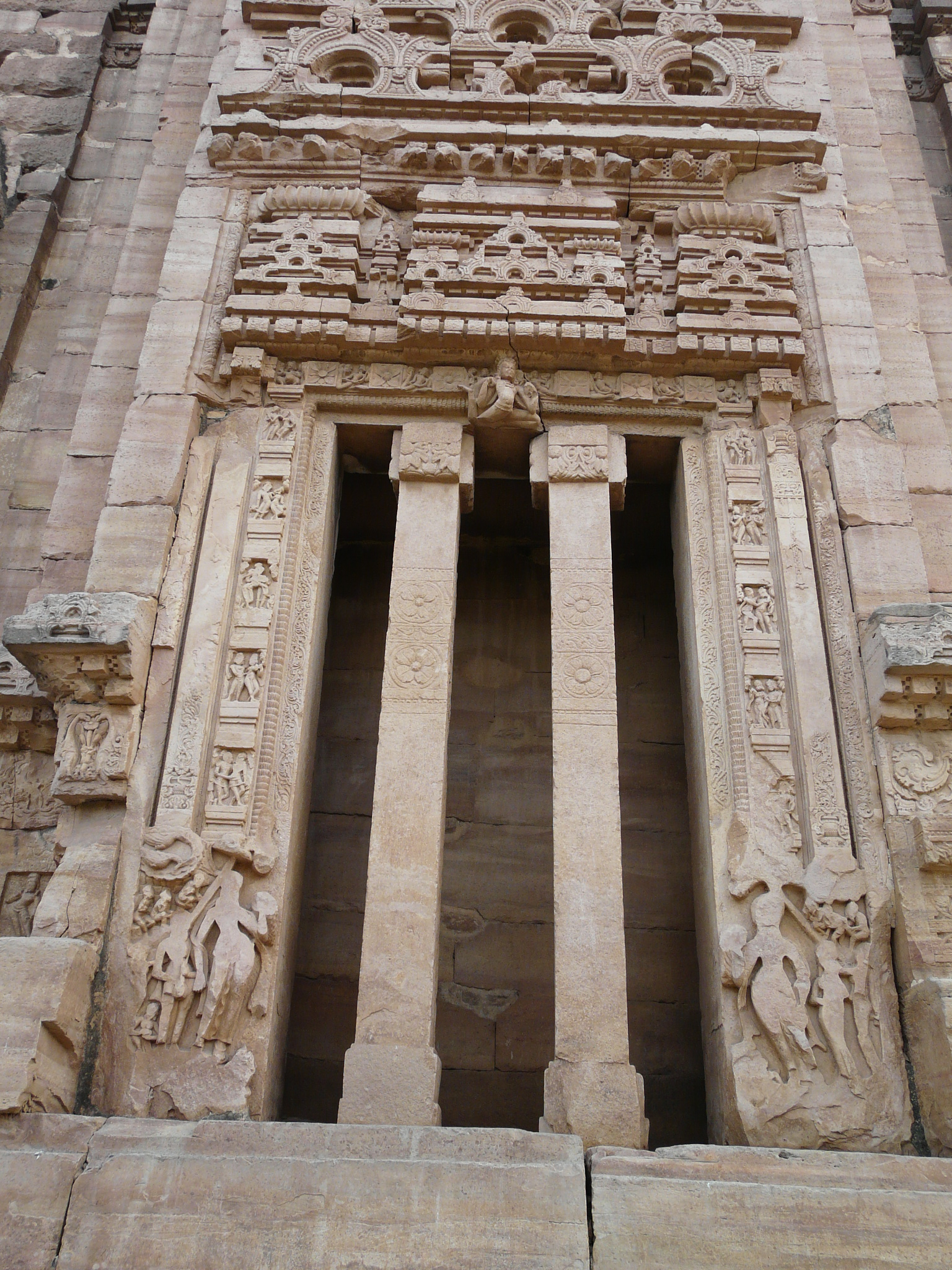
One of the four entrances to the temple with defaced sculpture.

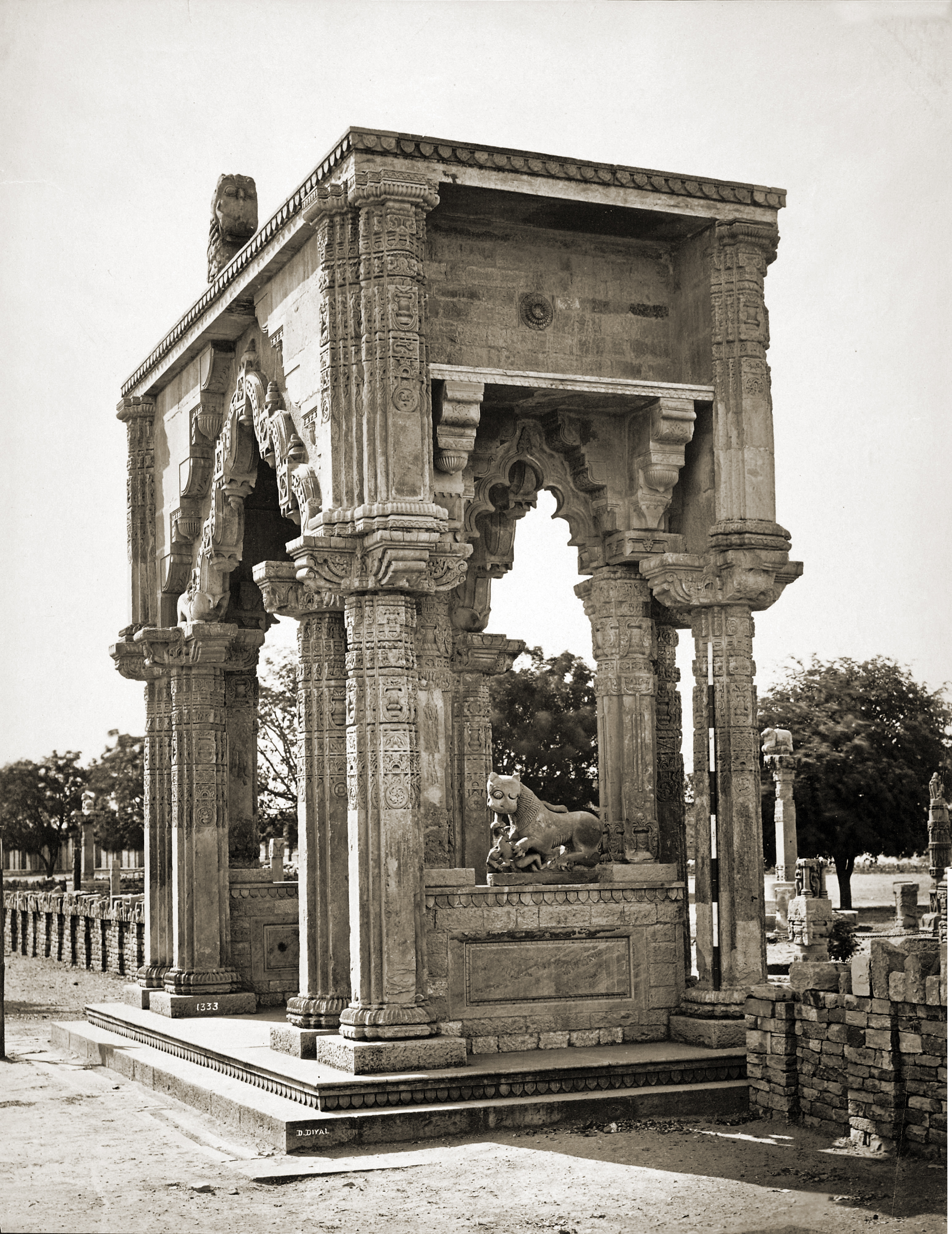
Gate of Teli ka Mandir.

The Teli ka mandir is unusual in many ways, and its complex design has led to many contesting proposals for what influenced it or which temples it influenced. Proposals range from it being influenced by Buddhist architecture, or by South Indian temples, or it being an independent masterpiece innovation of the late Gupta era Hindu artists.

The temple sanctum plan seems rectangular rather than the typical square, one that makes it the oldest surviving Hindu temple with a rectangular plan in Central India. According to Michael Meister, a professor specializing on Indian temple architecture, the temple is actually a study in squares nevertheless because its rectangles are formed by combining squares. The extensive damage and dislocation of its ruins before the 20th-century has led to misidentification and misclassification of the temple. According to Meister, and Hermann Goetz, the temple was broadly assumed in the colonial era to have been a Vishnu temple that was later converted into Shiva temple, the temple may have actually started as a temple dedicated to the Matrikas (mother goddesses), but one that included the motifs of Vaishnanism and Shaivism. The evidence for these are now in the ruins held by the Gwalior Museum and Delhi National Museum. Similarly, the assumed "southern influence" is likely an incorrect hypothesis as well, proposed by those who saw something similar in the South Indian majestic gopuram or the vaulted roofs at Mahabalipuram, Tamil Nadu. However, the influence could have been the other way around or possibly the result of collaboration between pan-Indian artist guild. Post-colonial era studies have identified similar ruined barrel-vault capped historic temples in many places in north and east India, including those in Odisha. Closer study of the keel vault details suggest that the ideas are markedly different expressions of an idea, rather than a copy.

The Teli ka temple of Gwalior is closest in its plan to a 4x4 square grid, yet different. According to Michael Meister this innovation is carried across the temple deliberately in its Bhadra, Pratibhadra, Karna, Kapota, Kumbha, Bhitta and other elements,

The Teli-ka-mandir enlarges such a grid by increasing the sanctum, not the entire structure, by 50 percent (from 4x4 to 4x6 squares, a ratio of 2: 3), thus enlarging the outer dimensions from 8x8 to 8x10 squares (a ratio of 4:5). The ratio of the thickness of wall to sanctum is 1:2 on the temple's shorter sides, 1:3 on the longer wall. Ratios that emerge from this analysis of the Teli-ka-mandir's plan thus include 1:1, 1:2, 1:3, 2:3, and 3:5 as well as 2:5 and 4:5. These simple ratios governing the plan and created by the grid might be compared to harmonic ratios. I know of no evidence to suggest a deep commitment in India to "musical" harmonies in architecture; yet few structures better embody harmonious proportions than the eighth-century Teli-ka-mandir.

== Gallery ==
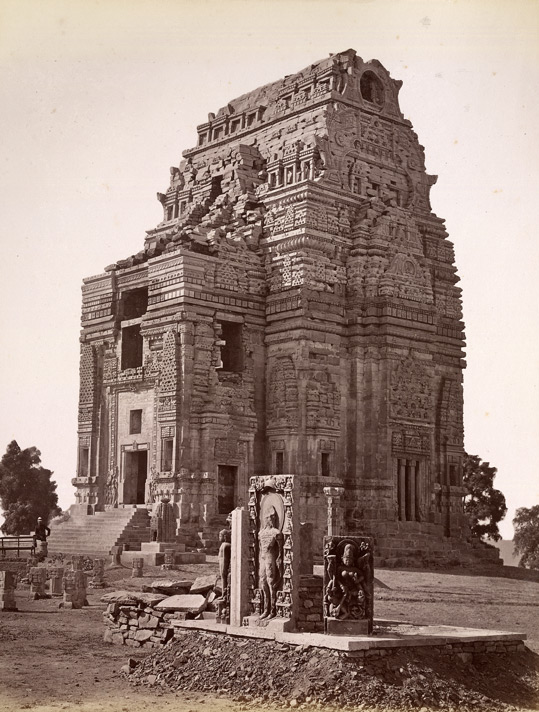
Ruined Jain sculptures at 8th century Teli ka Mandir

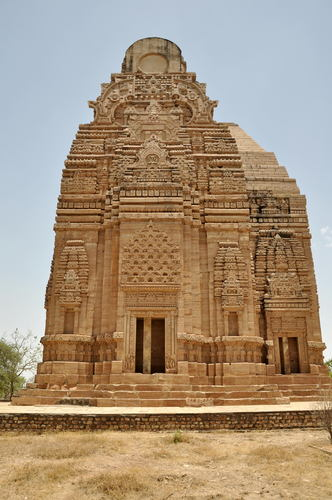
View of the Teli-ka-mandir

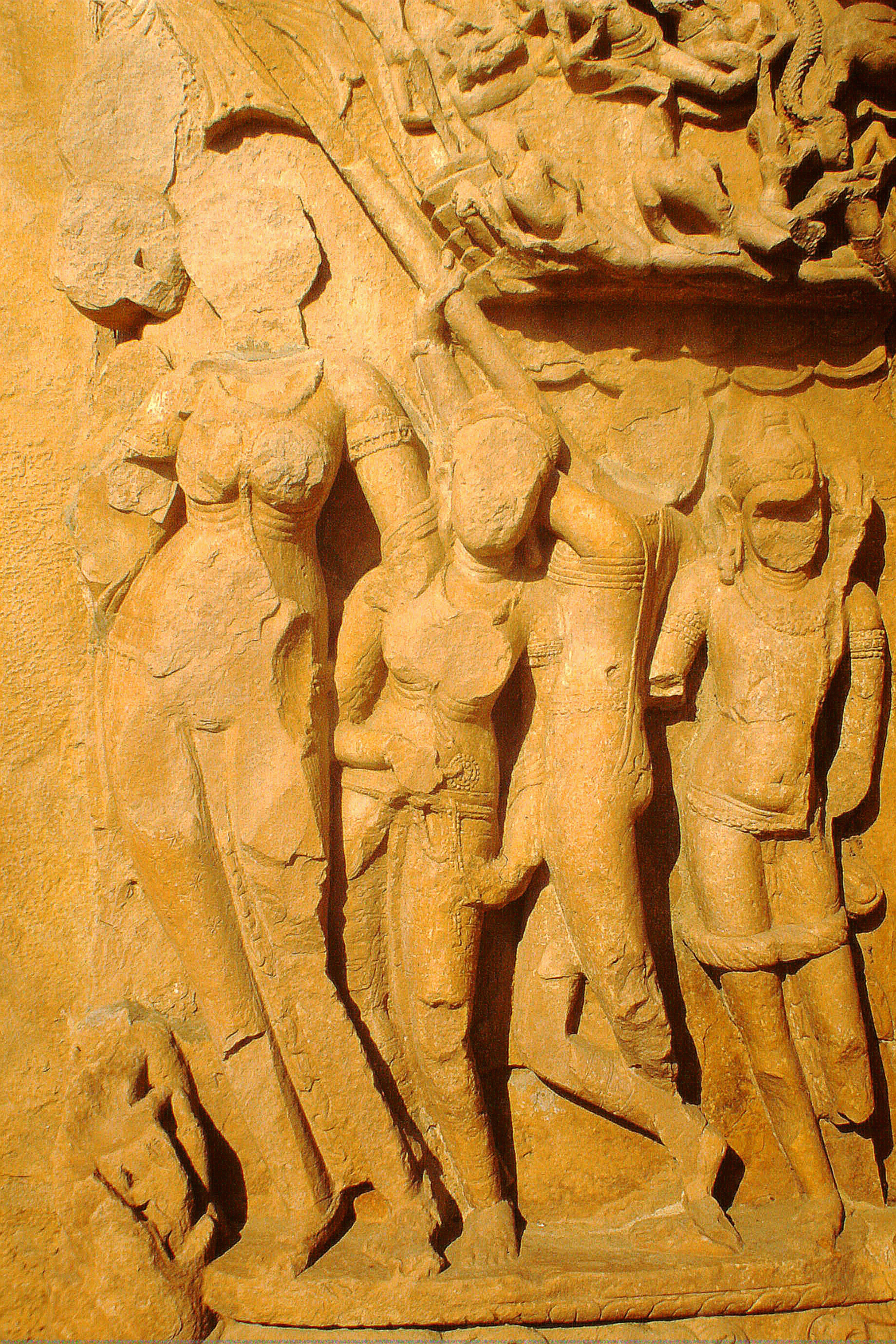
Defaced yet decipherable river goddess (eastern entrance)

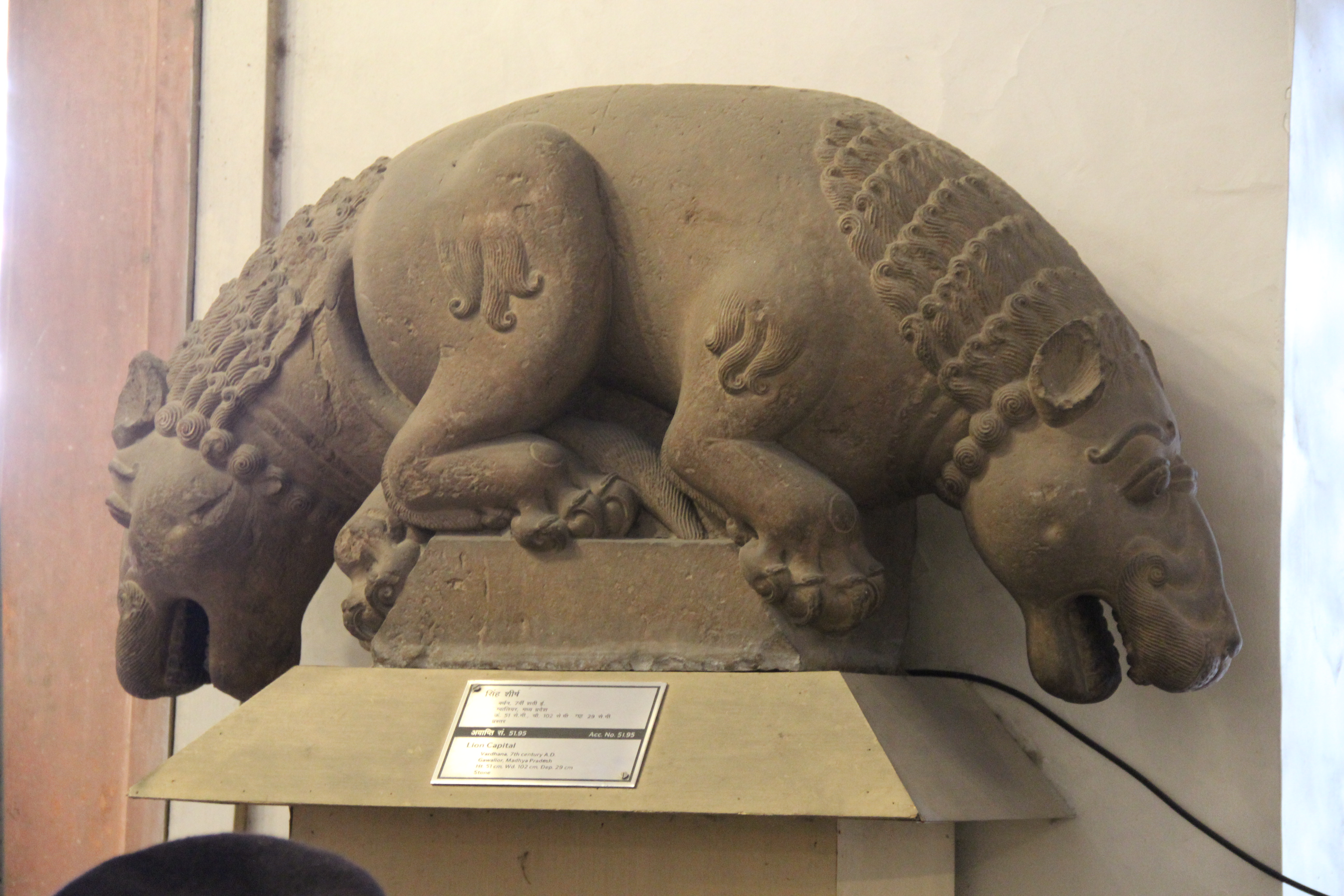
The lion capital in the National Museum, New Delhi, attributed by the museum to the Vardhana-period.

== See also ==
- Khajuraho Group of Monuments
- Nachna Hindu temples
- Siddhachal Caves
