= List of tourist attractions in Gwalior =

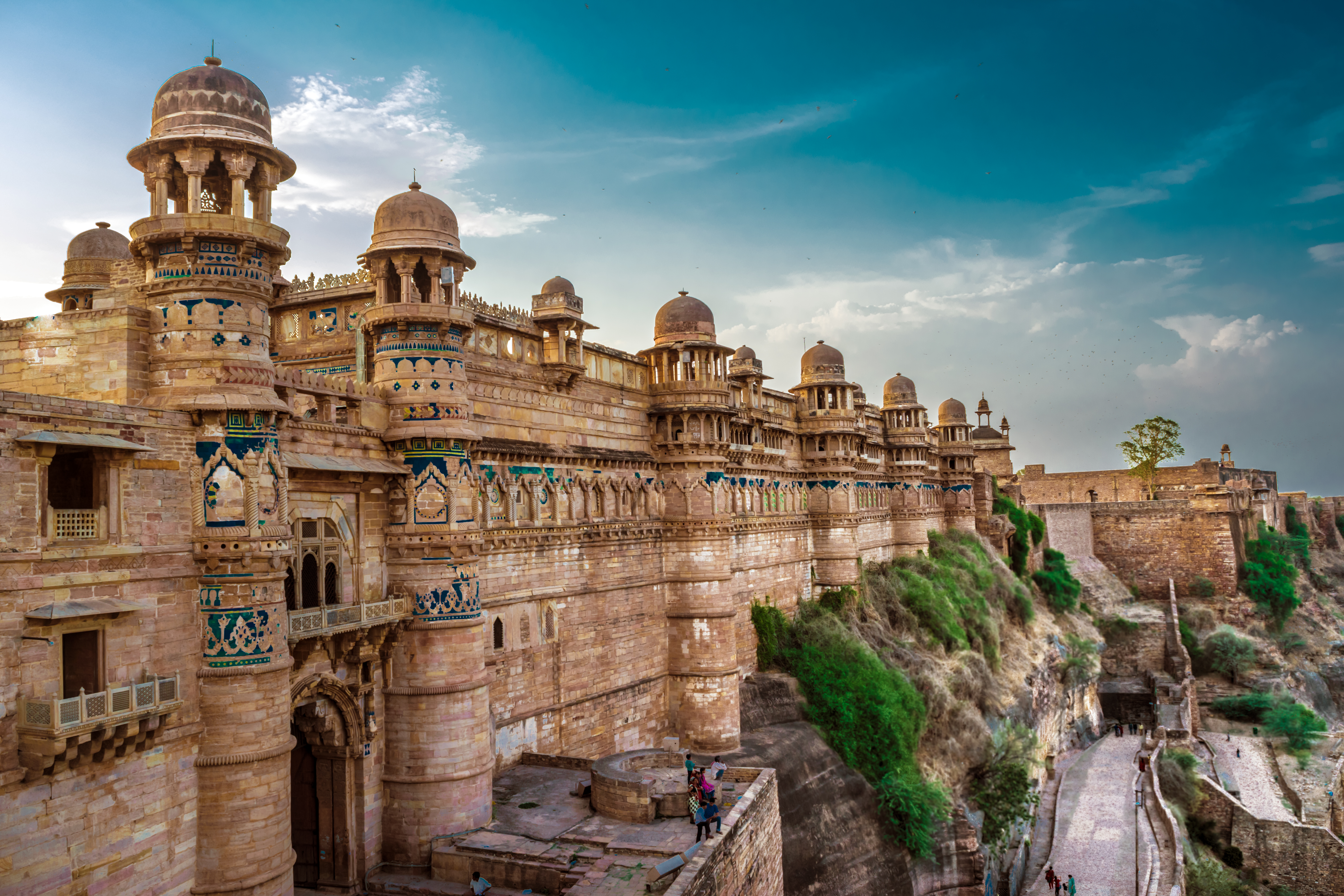
Man Mandir Palace at Gwalior Fort

Gwalior is a major historic city in the Indian state of Madhya Pradesh. Gwalior also known as City of Music declared by UNESCO in the UNESCO Creative Cities Network (UCCN).

== Attractions in Gwalior Fort ==
- Gwalior Fort also known as Gibraltar of India is a 5th-century hill fort in the City Gwalior.

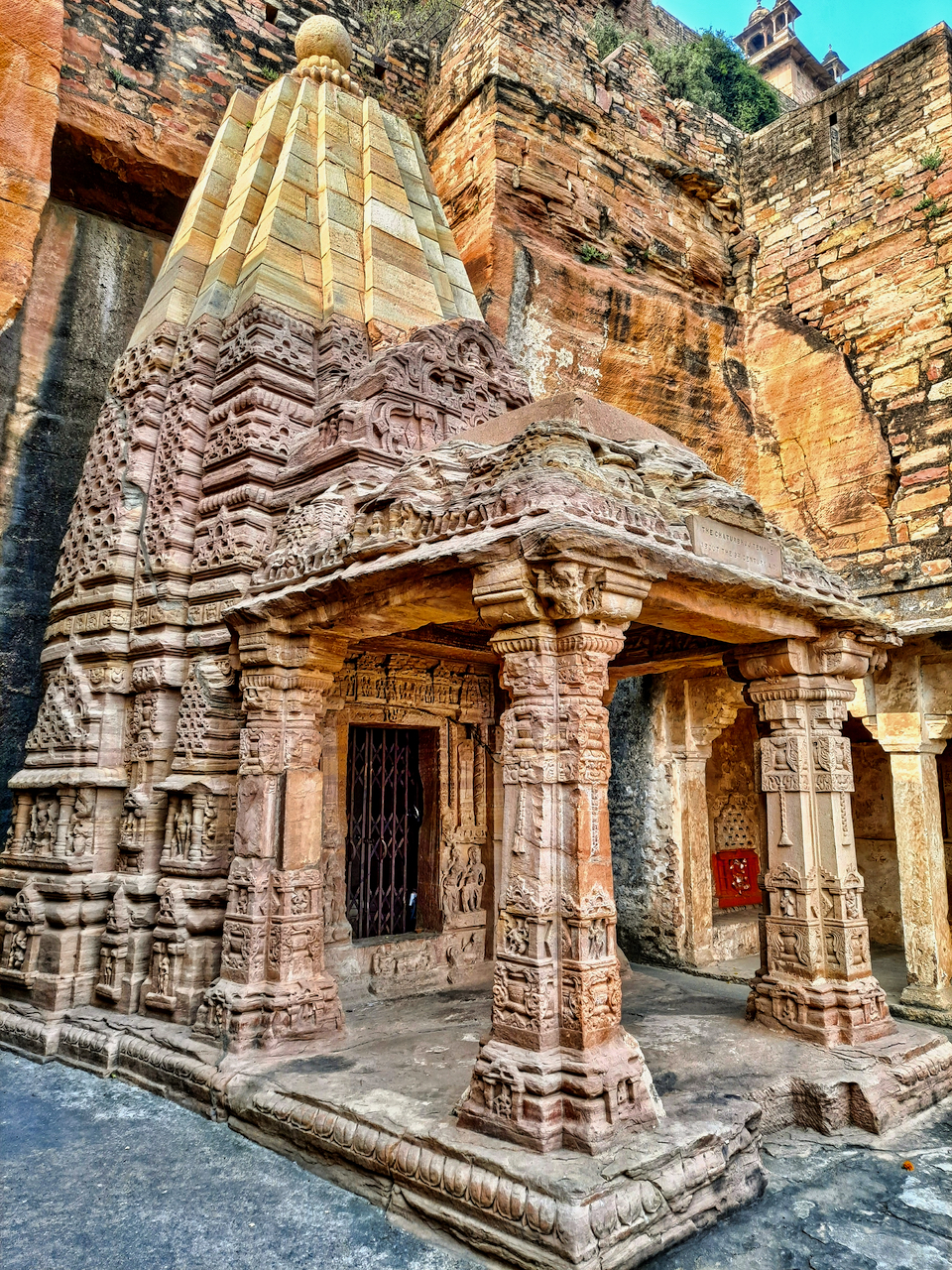
View Of Chaturbhuj Temple

- The Man Mandir Palace was built by the King of Tomar Dynasty – Man Singh Tomar in the 15th century. Man Mandir is often referred as a Painted Palace because the painted effect of the Man Mandir Palace is due to the use of styled tiles of turquoise, green and yellow used extensively in a geometric pattern.
- Chaturbhuj Temple is a Hindu temple excavated in a rock face in the Gwalior Fort. One of the temples inscriptions contains the earliest known inscription of the circular symbol "O", to represent zero, in India, though the Bakhshali manuscript is regarded as the earliest existent use of zero.

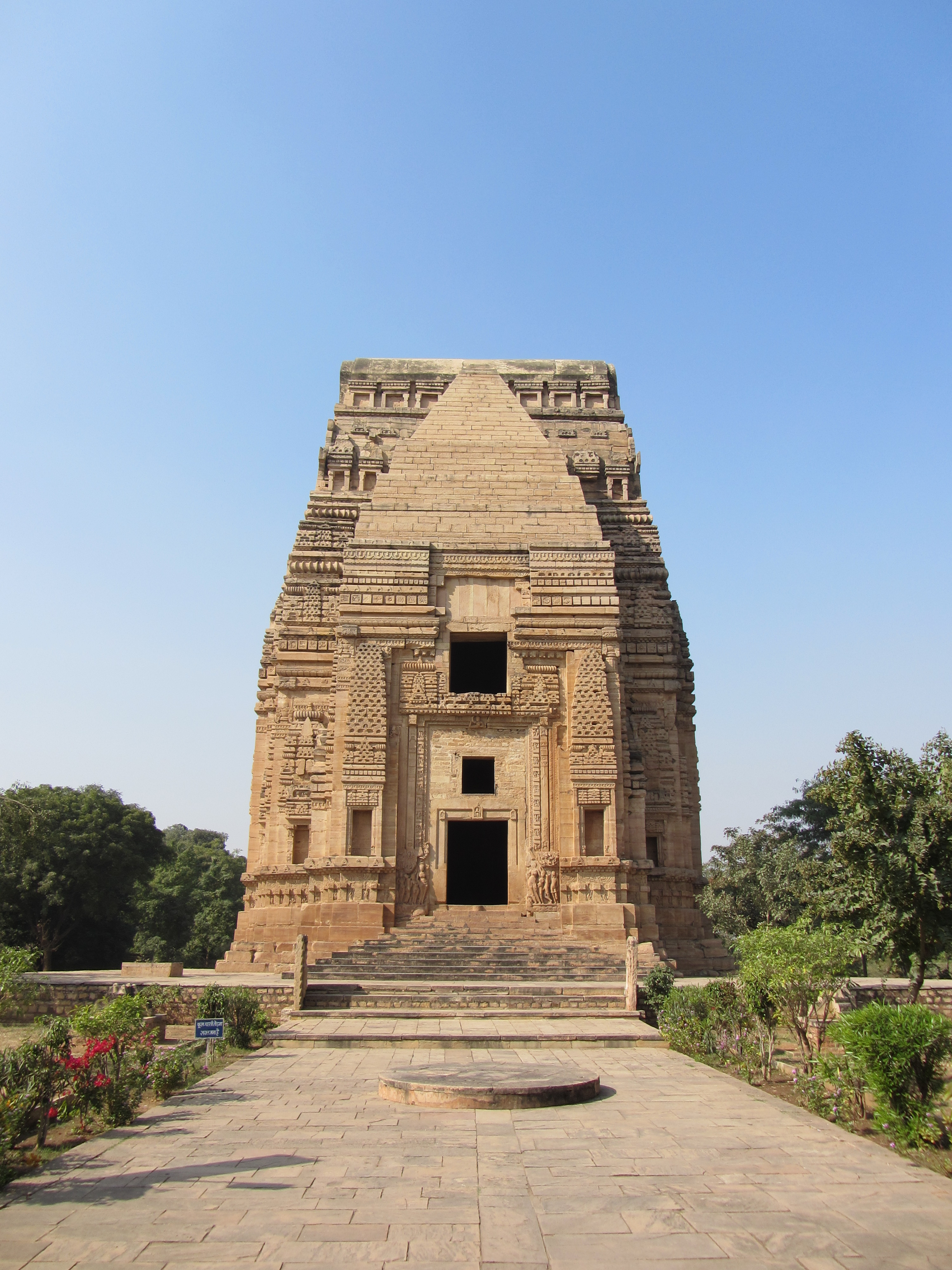
View Of Teli Ka Mandir

- Teli ka Mandir is early 8th century religious temple renowned for its Dravidian architecture and intricate artwork. It is the tallest building at the Gwalior Fort complex.
- Saas Bahu Temples are the 11th-century twin temples, consisting of two elaborately carved red sandstone temples. These temples architecture blends different styles, including Bhumija, Nagara, and Dravidian.
- Gurdwara Data Bandi Chhor Sahib is historical Gurdwara situated at the hill top Gwalior Fort. This Gurdwara associated with imprisonment of sixth Sikh Guru Guru Hargobind Ji along with 52 Rajput kings. The Gurudwara has been made out of white marble ornated in gold and every bit magnificent and holds a very aesthetically pleasing look. Be it the gurudwara or the pond connected to the religious site with palm trees lining the waterbody, it all paints quite a fancy picture.
- Gopachal Parvat Colossi are a group of Jain rock-cut carvings dated to between the 7th and 15th centuries. They are located around the walls of the Gwalior Fort.
- Siddhachal Caves are Jain cave monuments and statues carved into the rock face inside the Urvashi valley of the Gwalior Fort.
- Gujari Mahal also called Gwalior Fort Museum located in Gwalior Fort. It was built by Raja Man Singh Tomar for his wife Mrignayani, a Gujar princess.
- The Scindia School is situated in the historic Gwalior Fort. This school was established in 1897 by Maharaja Madho Rao Scindia. It is one of the most expensive school of India.
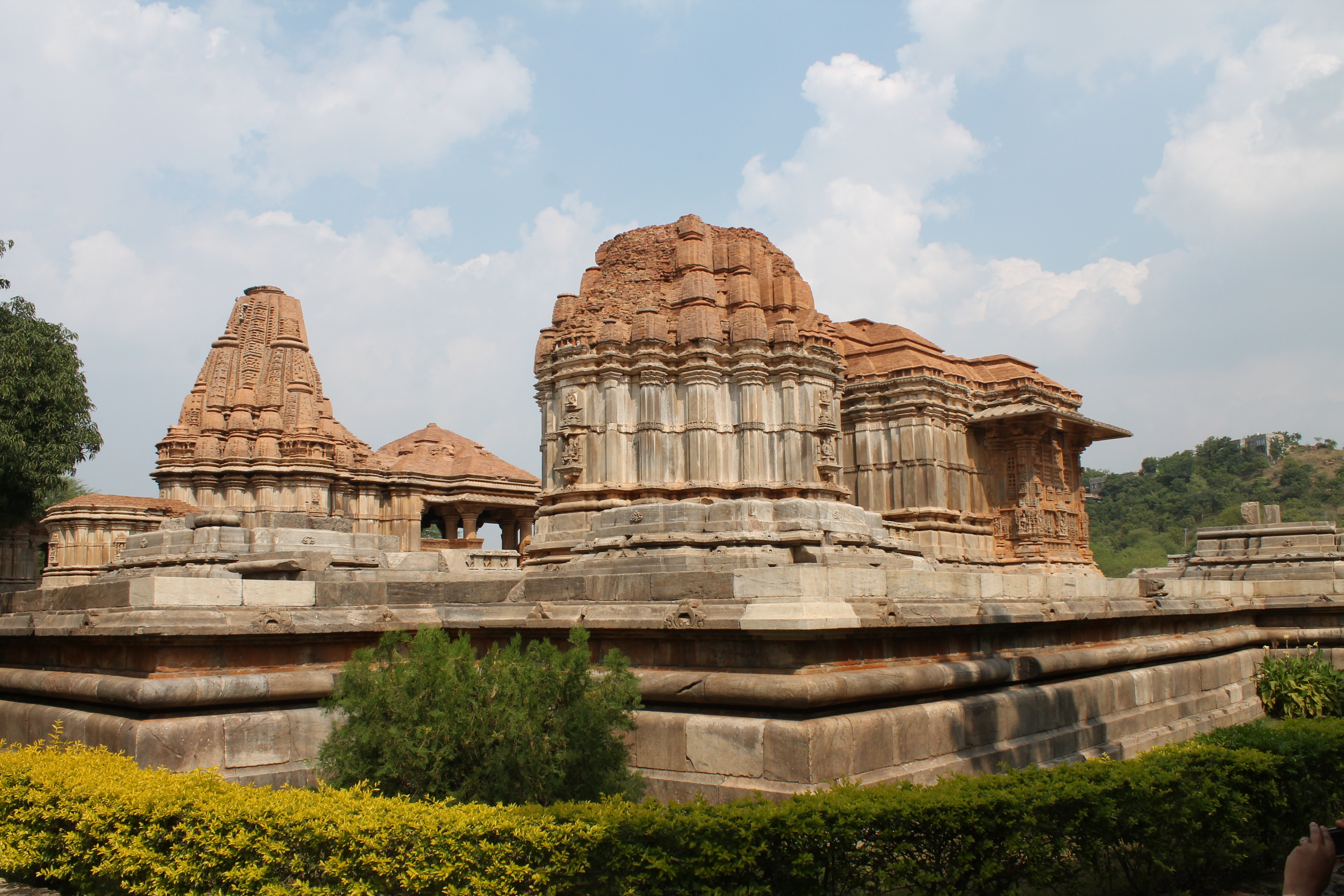
Sahastabahu Temples

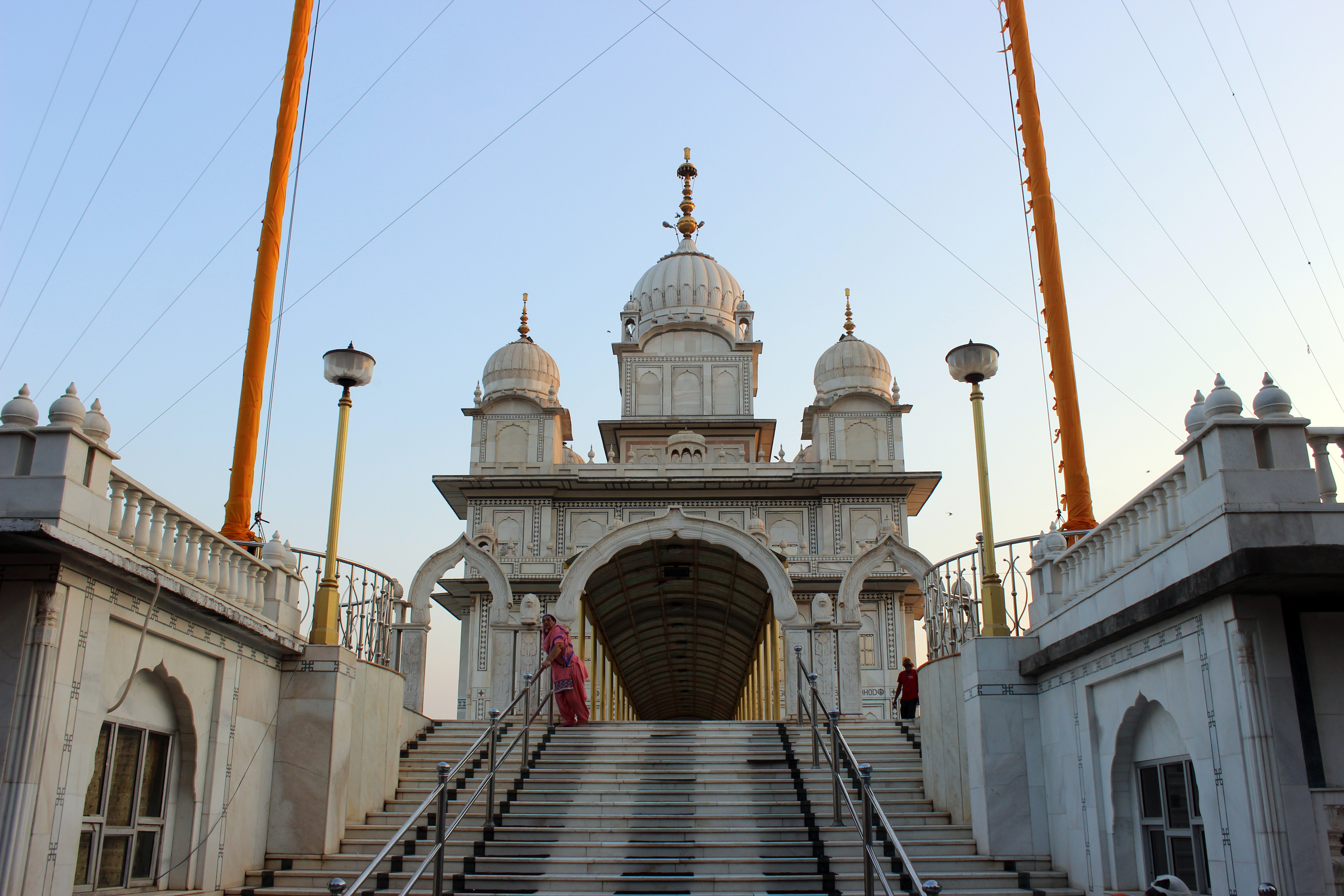
Gurdwara Data Bandi Chhor Sahib

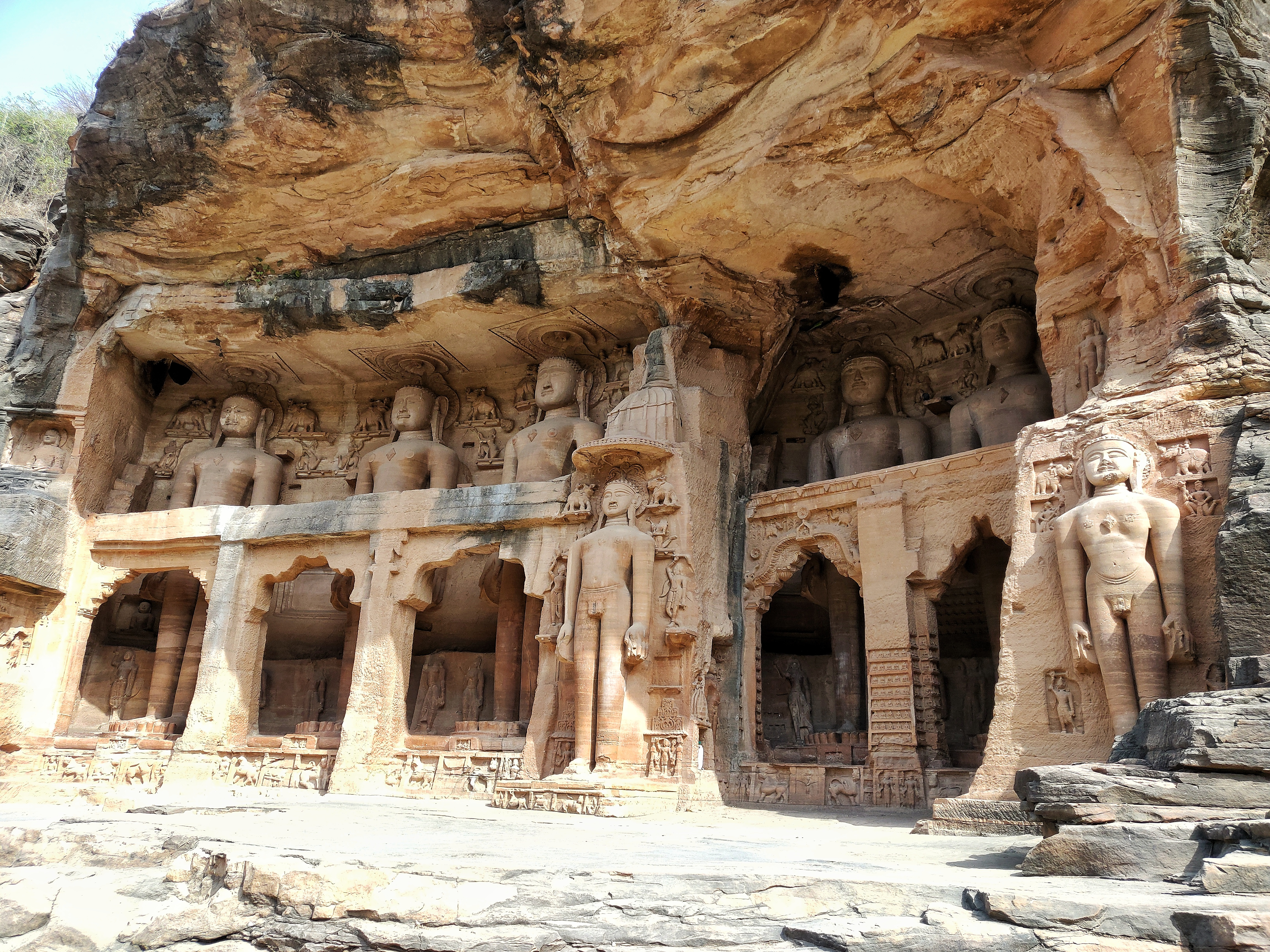
Rock-cut Tirthankar Sculptures of Gopachal Parvat located around the walls of Gwalior Fort

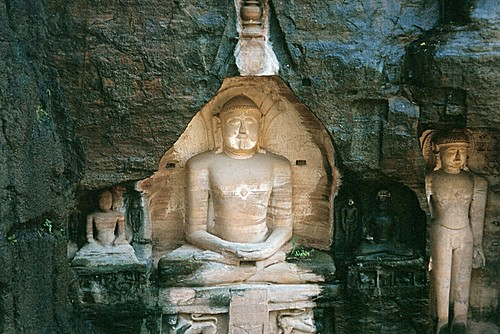
Siddhachal Caves Jain Temples

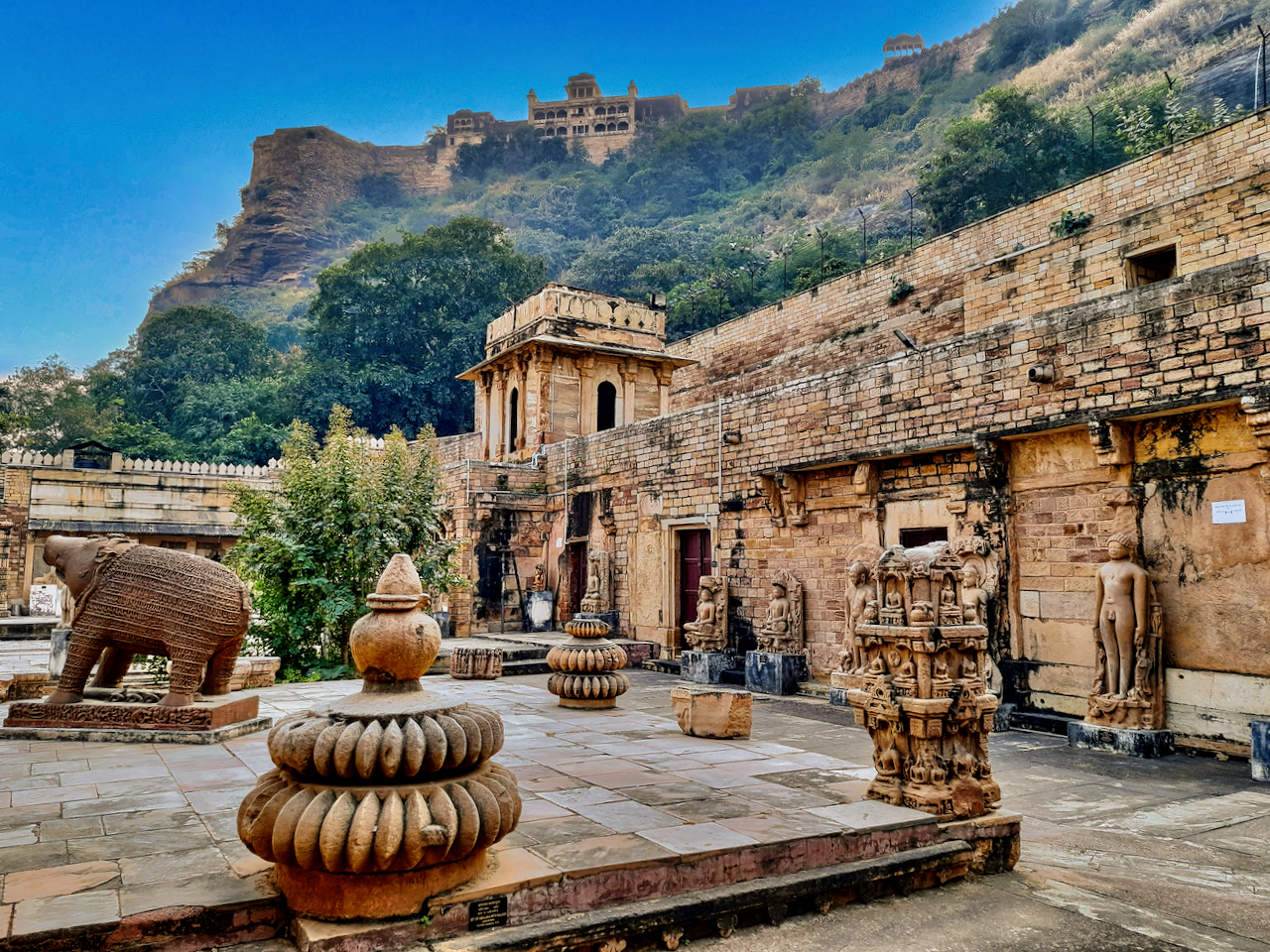
Gujari Mahal - Finest collections of Hindu, Buddhist and Jain artwork

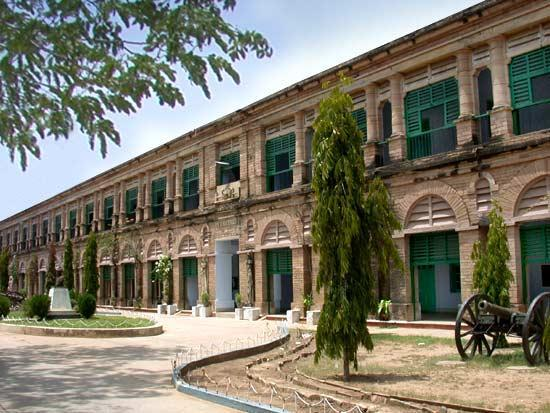
The Scindia School

== Attractions in Gwalior City ==
- Maharaj Bada is one of the most beautiful square of India and heart of the Gwalior. Here all seven architecture - British, Rajput and Maratha, Italian, Roman, French, Saudi-Arabian and Persian, was ready in 7 years.
- The Jai Vilas Palace is a nineteenth-century palace in Gwalior, India. It was built in 1874 by Jayajirao Scindia, the Maharaja of Gwalior in the British Raj. It is a fine example of European architecture.
- Usha Kiran Palace is a heritage hotel, adjacent to Jai Vilas Mahal on a 9-acre land in Gwalior built by the royal Scindia dynasty of the Marathas. The management of the five-star hotel is done by Taj Hotels Resorts and Palaces.
- The Sun Temple was constructed in the year 1988 by the famous industrialist G.D. Birla. Built on the lines of legendary Sun Temple at Konark, Orissa, the Sun Temple of Gwalior is a magnificent amalgam of exquisite architecture in red sandstone and pearly white marble.
- Achleshwar Mahadev Temple is about 300 year old Lord Mahadev temple located in Gwalior.
- Tombs Of Mohammed Ghaus & Tansen are situated in the city of Gwalior. Well known for its architecture, the tomb complex is one of the prominent sightseeing attractions in Gwalior. The Tomb of Mohammad Ghaus was built in the 16th century AD during the Akbar's rule and The Memorial of Tansen, also known as the Tomb of Tansen, is located in the vicinity of Muhammad Ghaus Tomb
- Gwalior Zoo officially called Mahatma Gandhi Zoological Park is one of greenest and best kept wildlife parks of Madhya Pradesh. It was constructed by Madho Rao Scindia and opened by the Prince of Wales in 1922. The zoo is set within the large area known as Phool Bagh.
- Italian Garden is a hidden gem that holds its own unique significance. Tucked away in the heart of the city, this serene and picturesque garden offers a delightful escape from the hustle and bustle of urban life. It showcases the harmonious blend of Italian architectural influences and Indian natural aesthetics.
- Samadhi of Rani Lakshmi Bai was built in honor of the warrior queen of Jhansi, Rani Lakshmi Bai, her Samadhi is a famous attraction. Apart from the Samadhi, the attraction has a magnificent 8 meter high metal statue of Rani Lakshmi Bai. A fair is organized at this place every year in June in honor of the queen. It is an ideal attraction for history lovers.
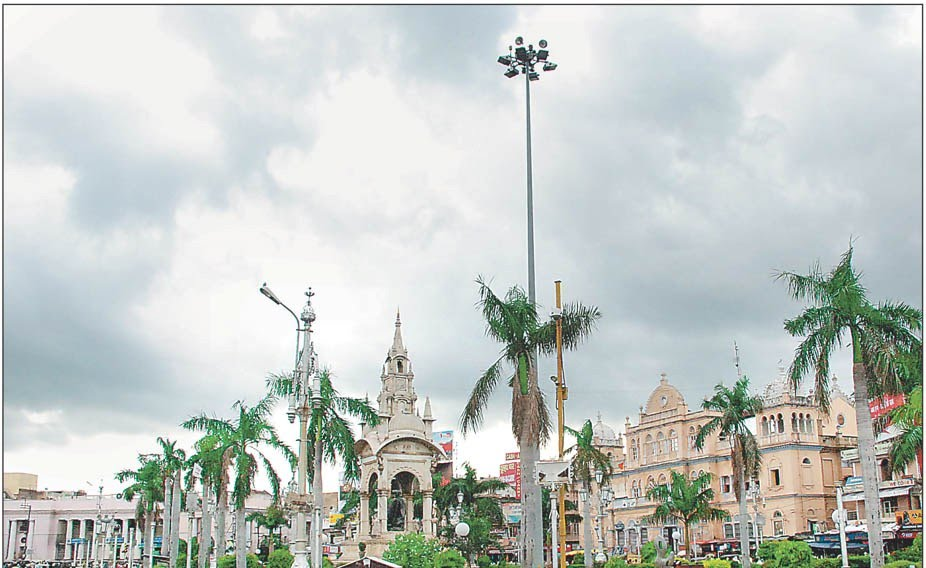
Maharaj Bada

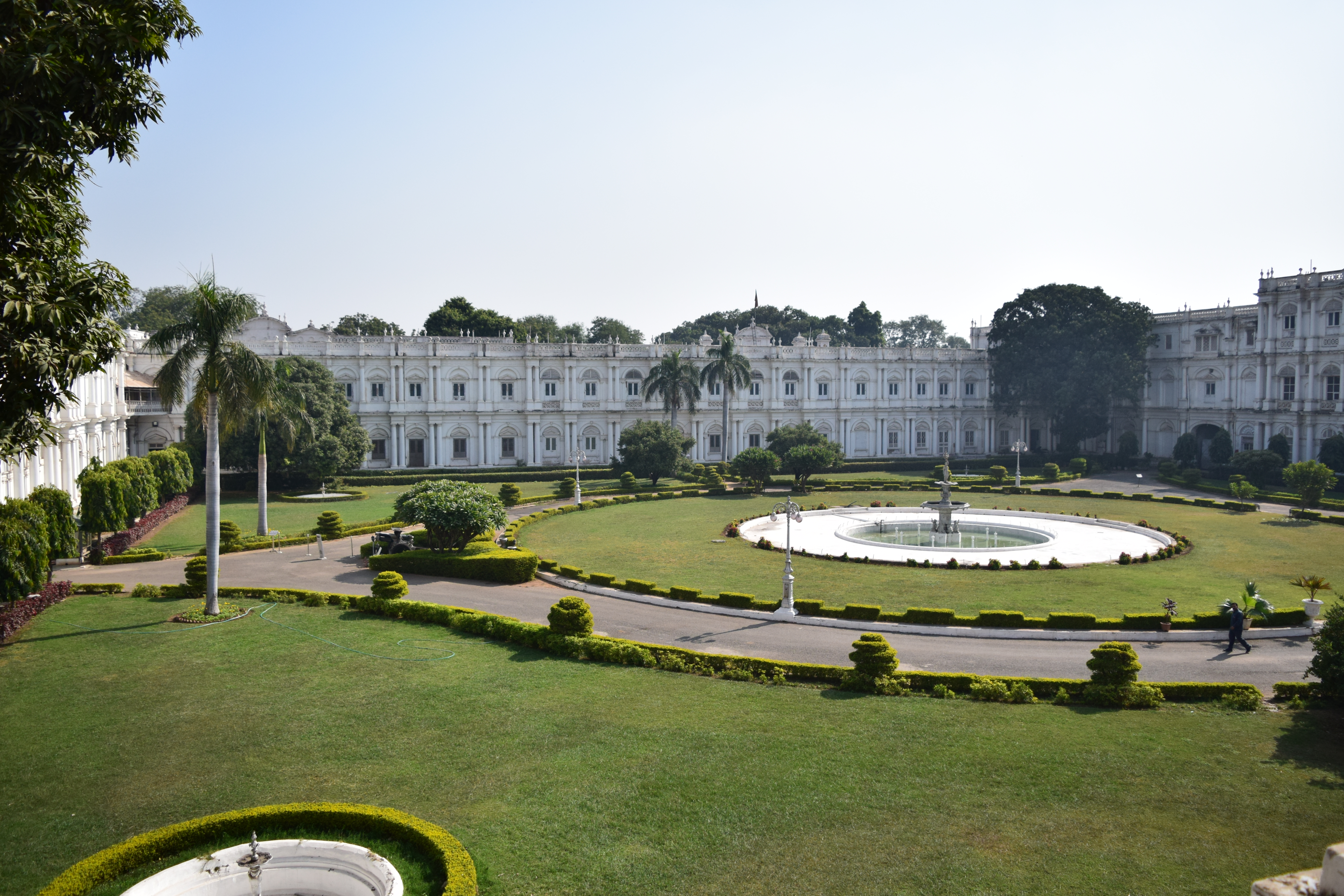
The Jai Vilas Palace

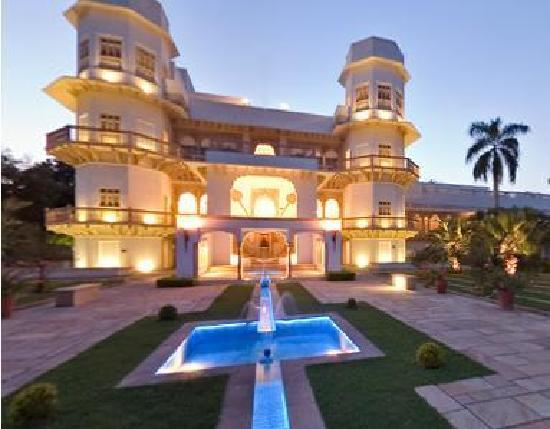
Usha Kiran Palace

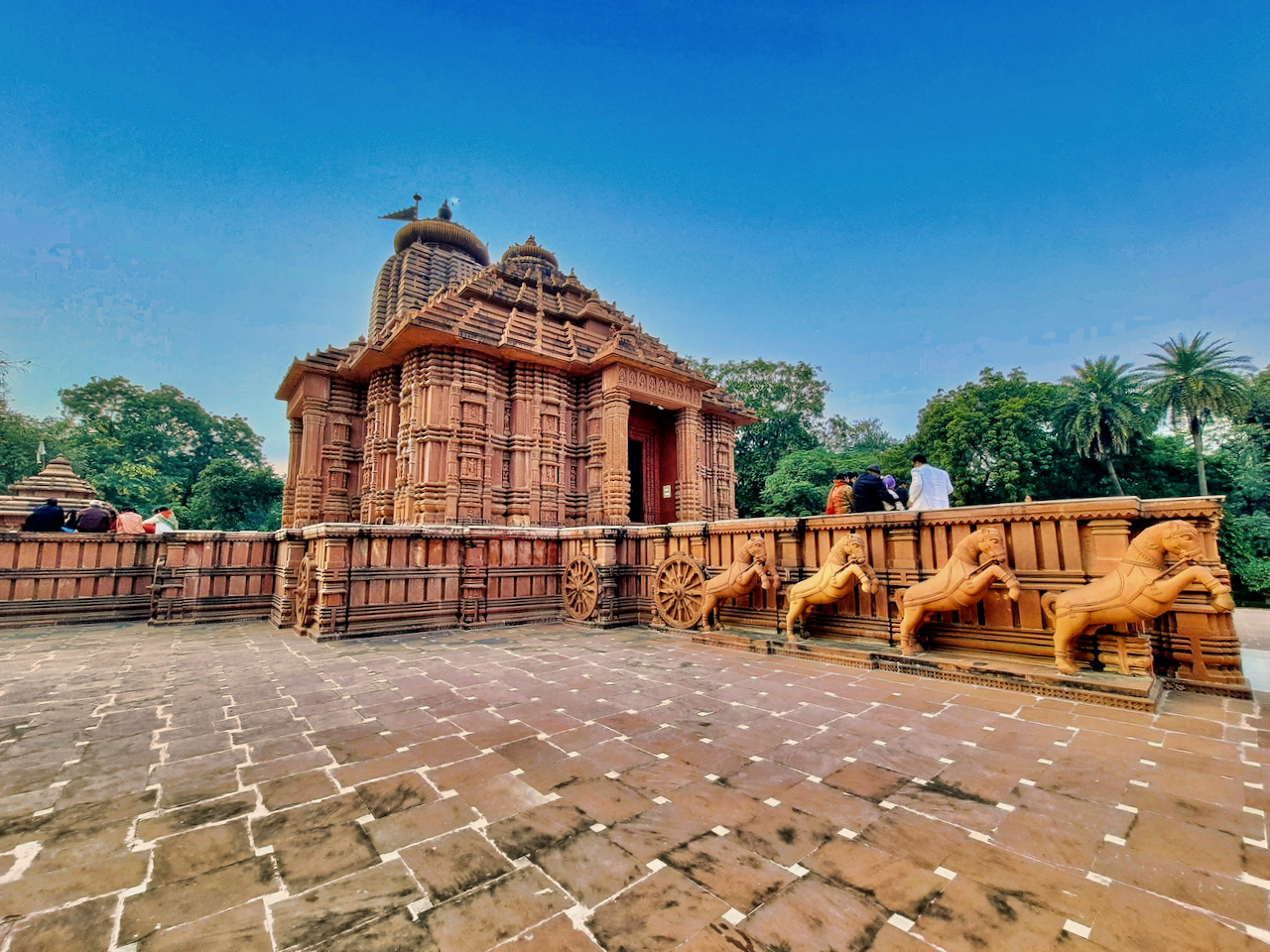
Sun Temple

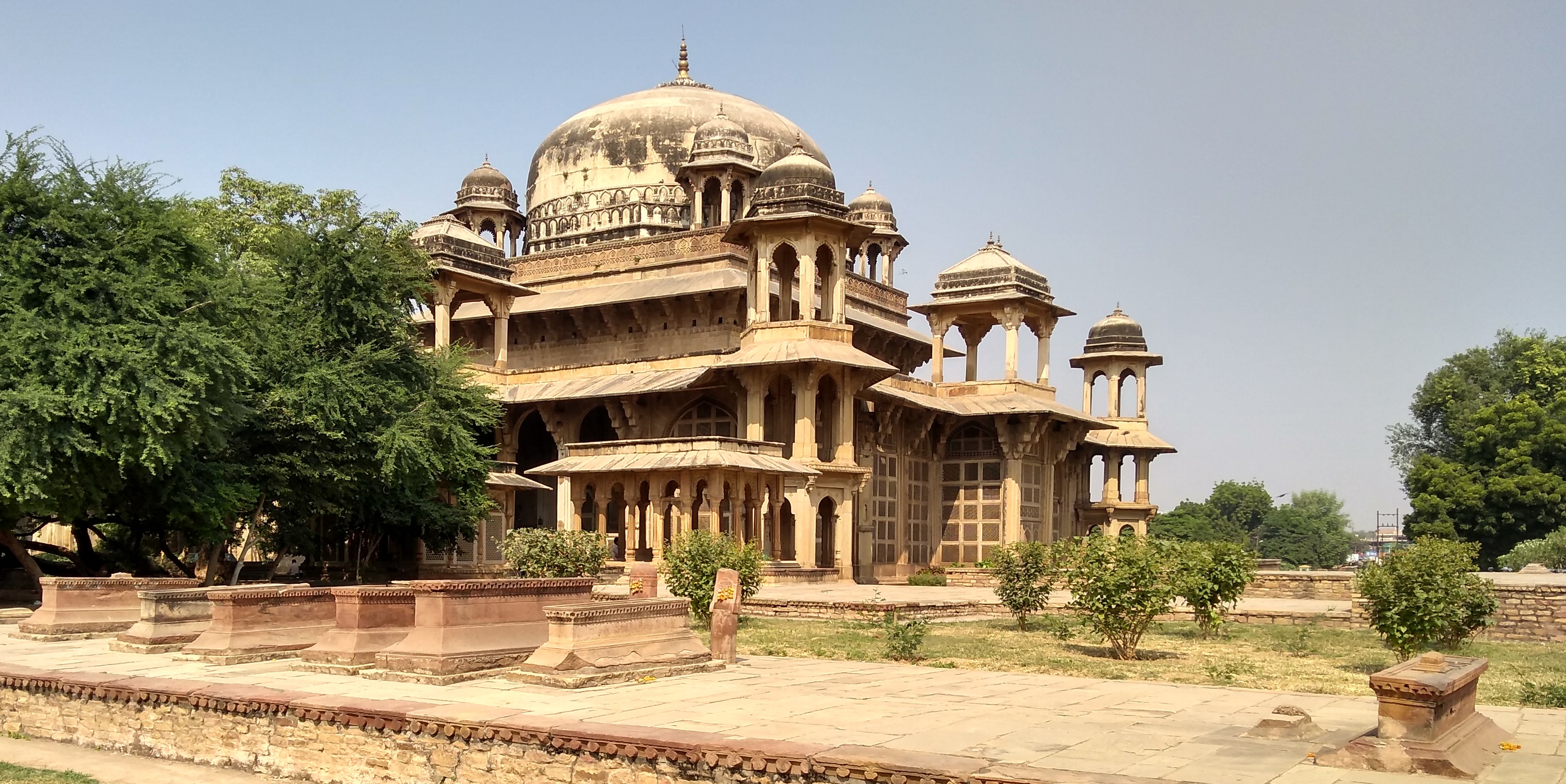
Tomb of Mohammad Ghaus

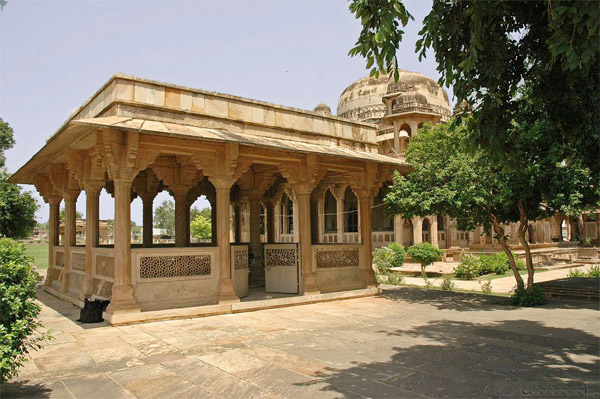
Tomb of Tansen

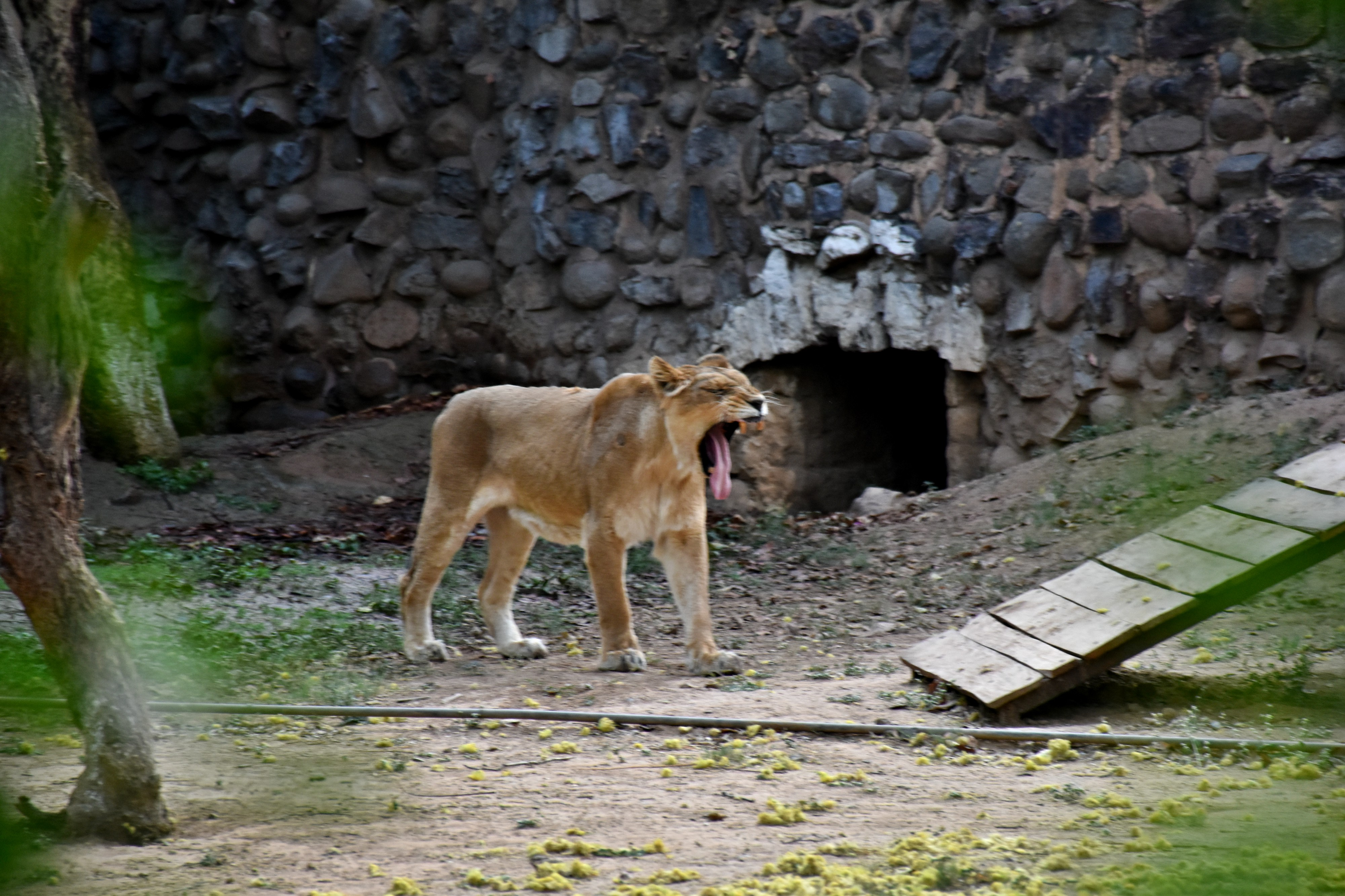
Mahatma Gandhi Zoological Park

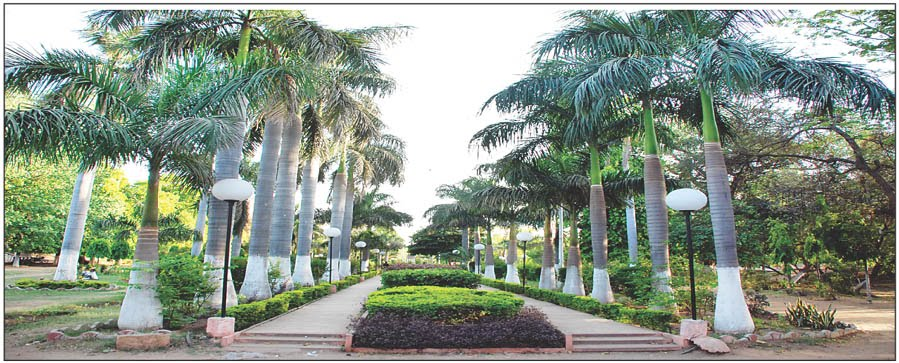
Phool Bagh, Gwalior

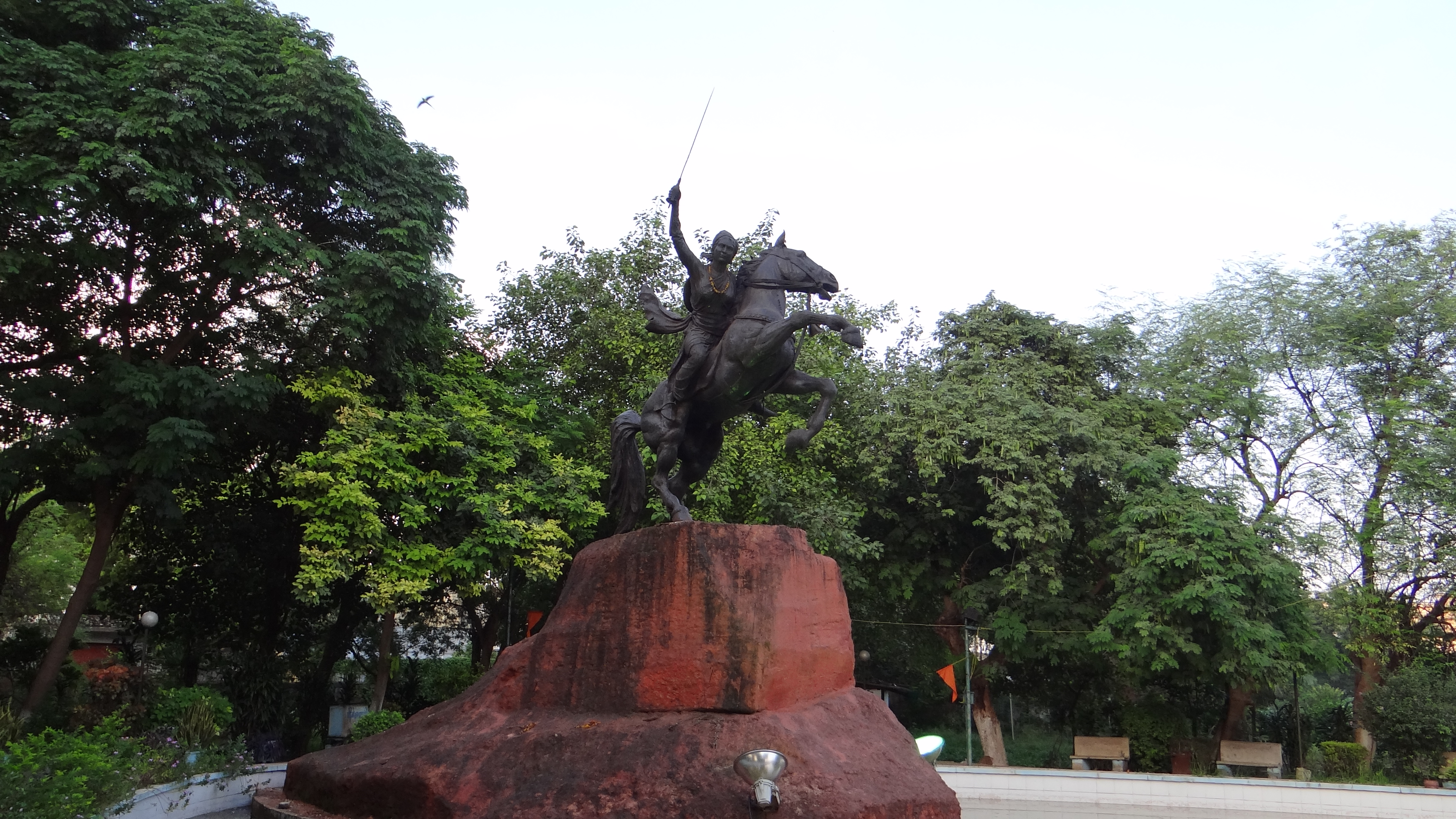
Samadhi Of Rani Lakshmibai

== Attractions in Gwalior District ==
- Tigra Dam is a fresh water reservoir situated about 23 km from Gwalior.
- Ghatigaon Wildlife Sanctuary is located in Ghatigaon in Gwalior District. It is mainly known for conservation efforts directed towards revival of Great Indian Bustard (Ardeotis nigriceps) population in India.
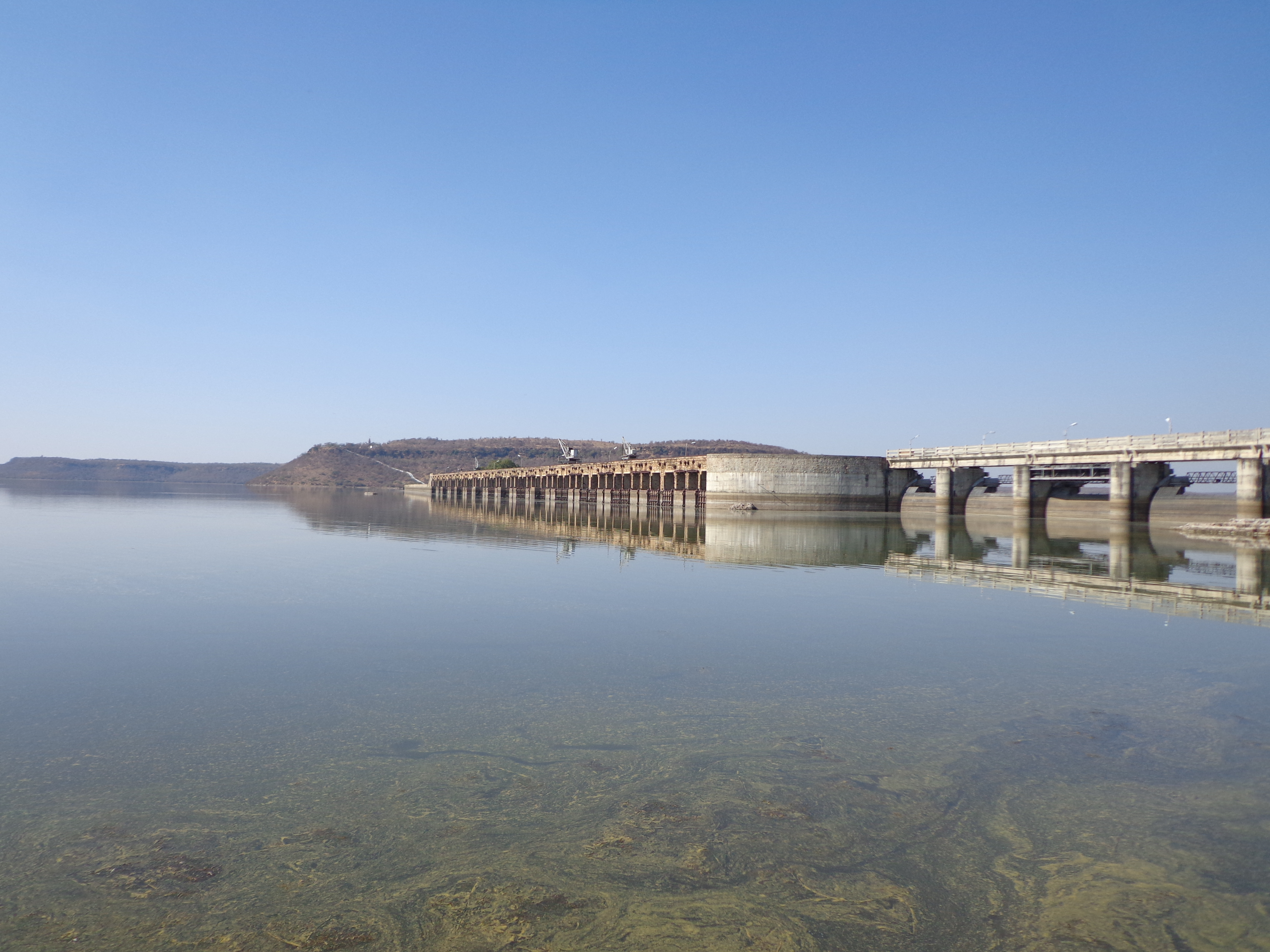
Tighra Dam

== Attractions in nearby districts of Gwalior ==
- Chausath Yogini Temple is an 11th-century temple located in Mitaoli village of Morena district and about 40km from Gwalior. Visitors compared this temple with the old Indian parliament building (Sansad Bhawan) as both are circular in style. Many have drawn conclusions that this temple was the inspiration behind the Sansad Bhawan.
- Bateshwar Group of Temple's are a group of nearly 200 sandstone Hindu temples built between 8th and 10th-century by the Gurjara kings in Morena district. It is about 35km north of Gwalior and about 30 km east of Morena.
- Kakanmath Temple is a ruined 11th century Shiva temple located in Sihoniya village of Morena district. It was built by the Kachchhapaghata ruler Kirttiraja. It is about 55km north of Gwalior and about 30 km east of Morena.
- Shanichara Temple is one of the oldest Shani Dev Mandir in Aiti village of Morena district. Idol of Shani Dev at the temple is believed to be very ancient and carved out of meteorite fallen on earth. Hanumanji was the main force behind the origination of history of this temple. It is situated about 25km north of Gwalior and about 35km south-east of Morena
- Kuno National Park is one the most unique destination for all wildlife lovers and enthusiasts. It is located in Sheopur district. Kuno National Park is known for its leopard, jackal, Chinkara and now Home Of Cheetah. It is about 160km west of Gwalior.
- Madhav National Park is situated in Shivpuri District. Some of the prominent flora of this park includes Dhawda, Palash, Khair, Kerdhai, and Salai. Madhav National Park offers tourists wide opportunities to sight popular animals like tiger, leopard, striped hyenas. It is situated about 120km south of Gwalior.
- George Castle was built in 1911 by the Scindia, ruler of Gwalior for an overnight halt of King George V of England.

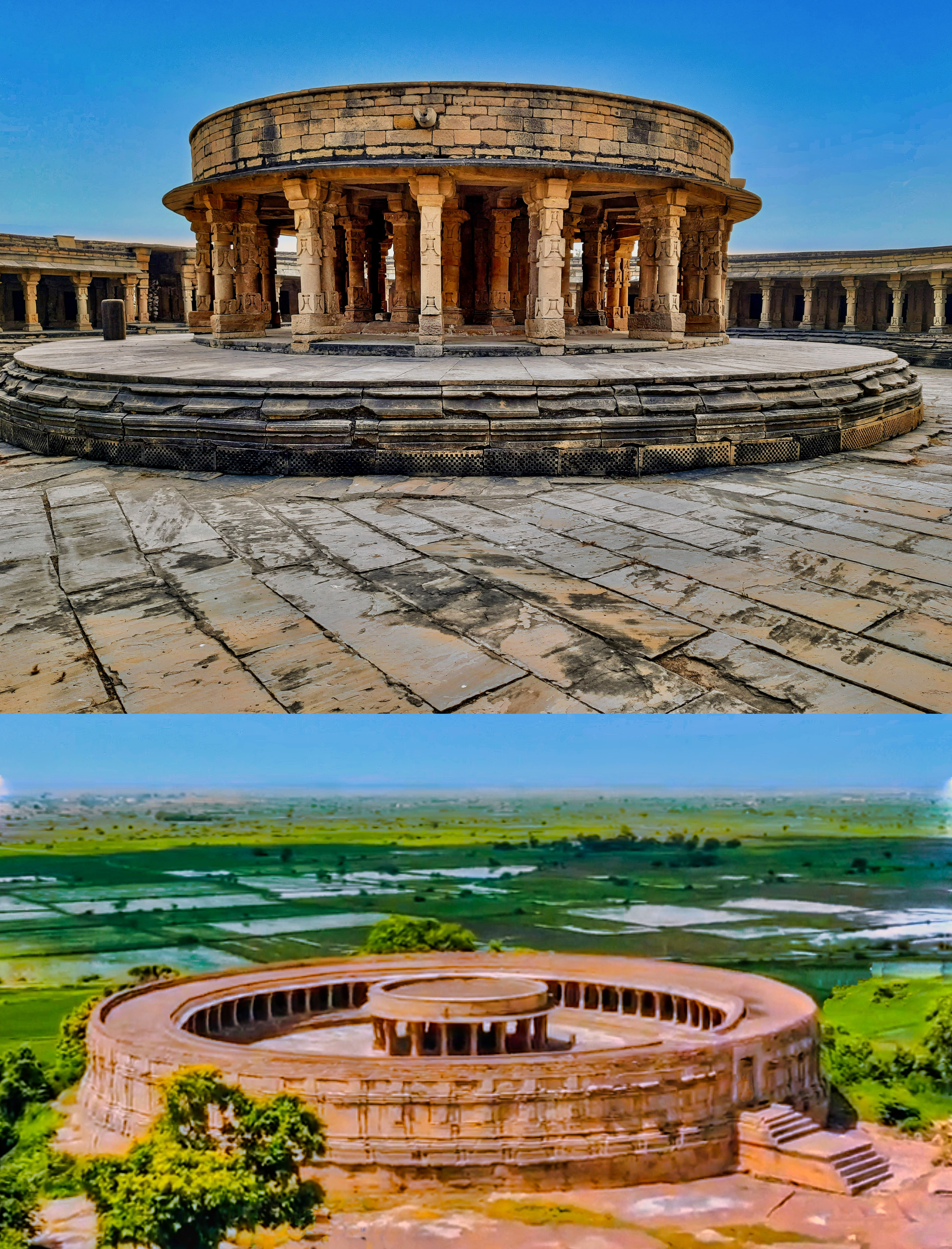
Chausath Yogini Temple

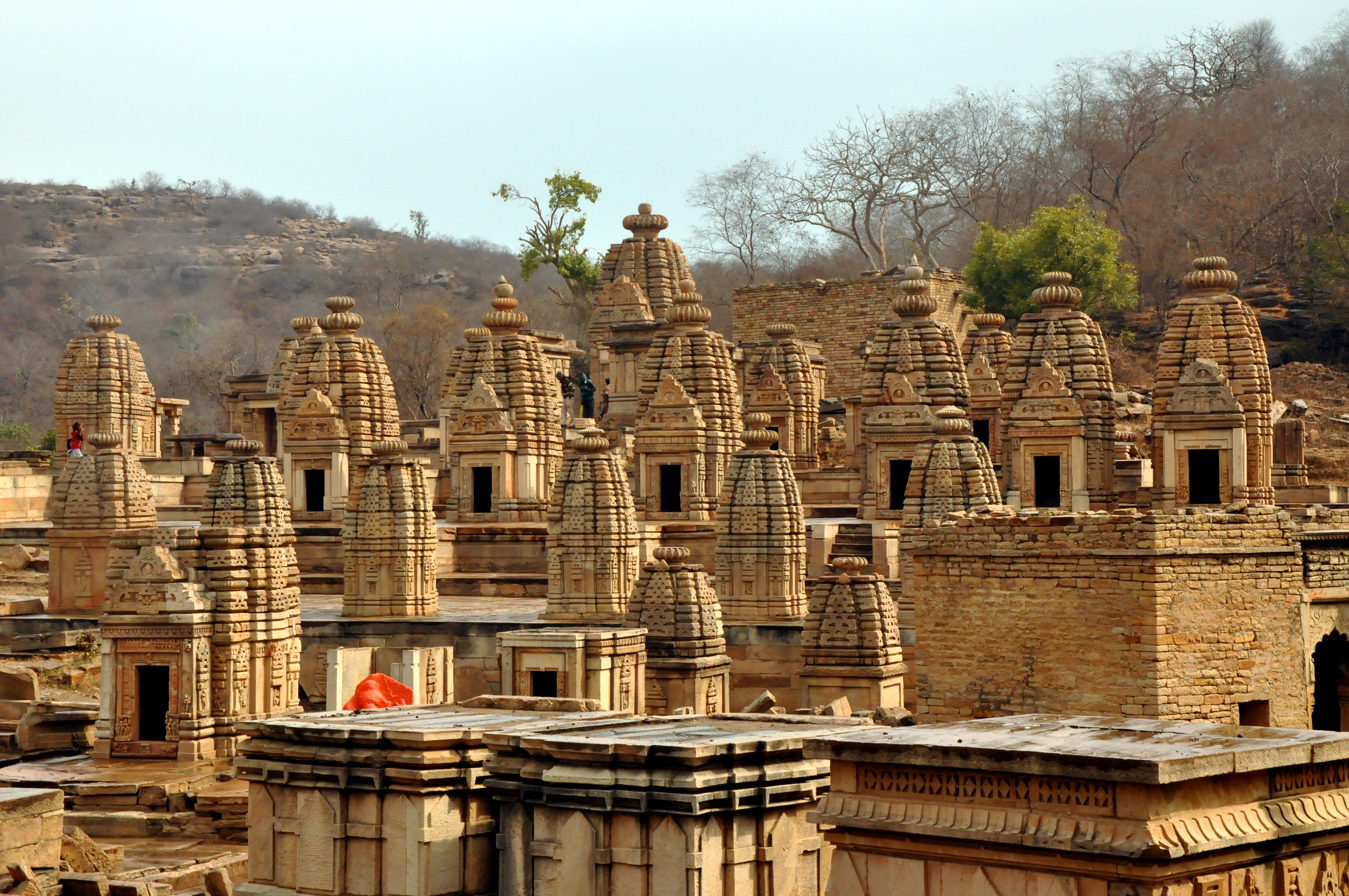
Bateshwar Group of Temple's

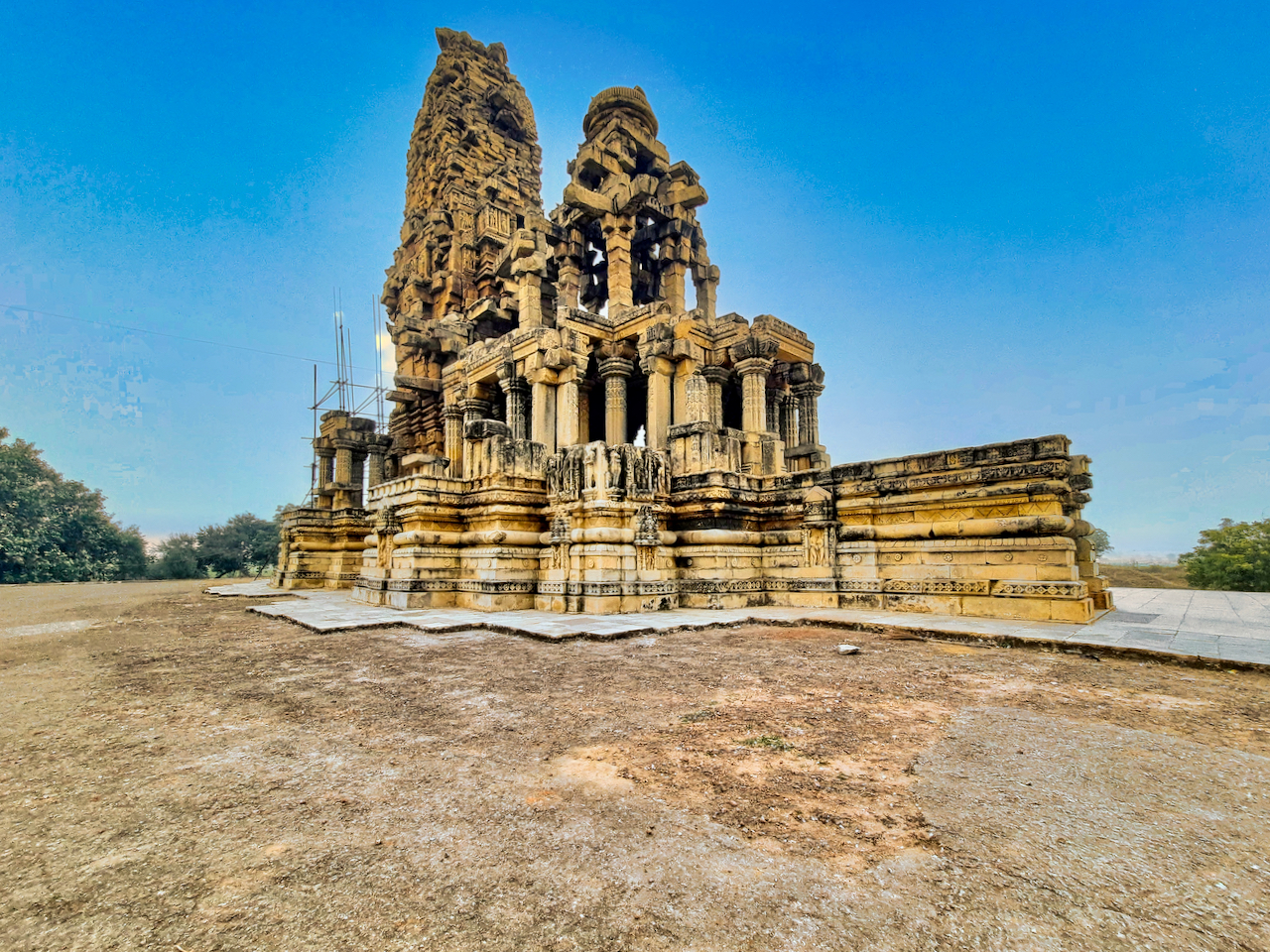
Kakanmath temple

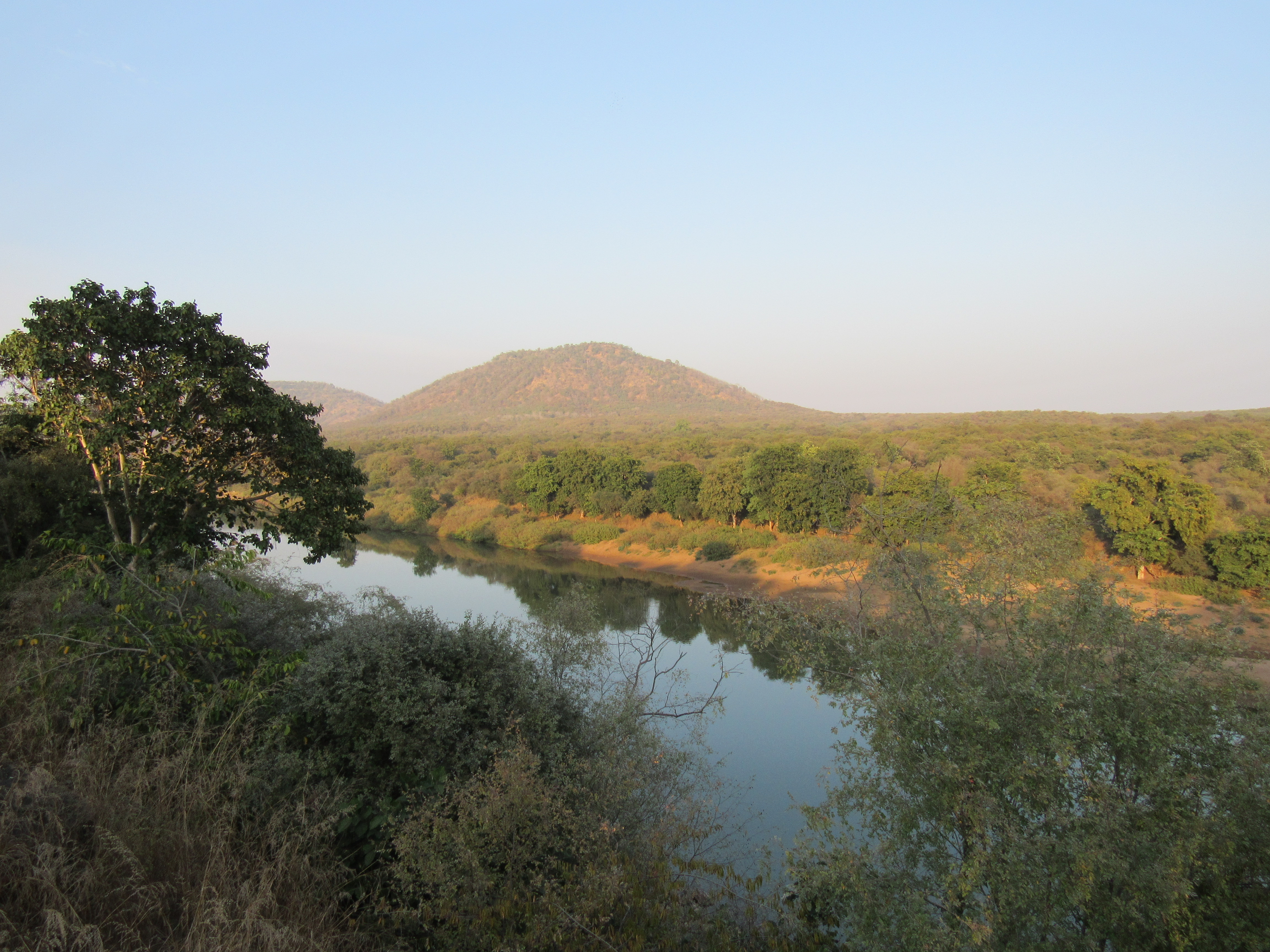
Kuno River in Kuno National Park

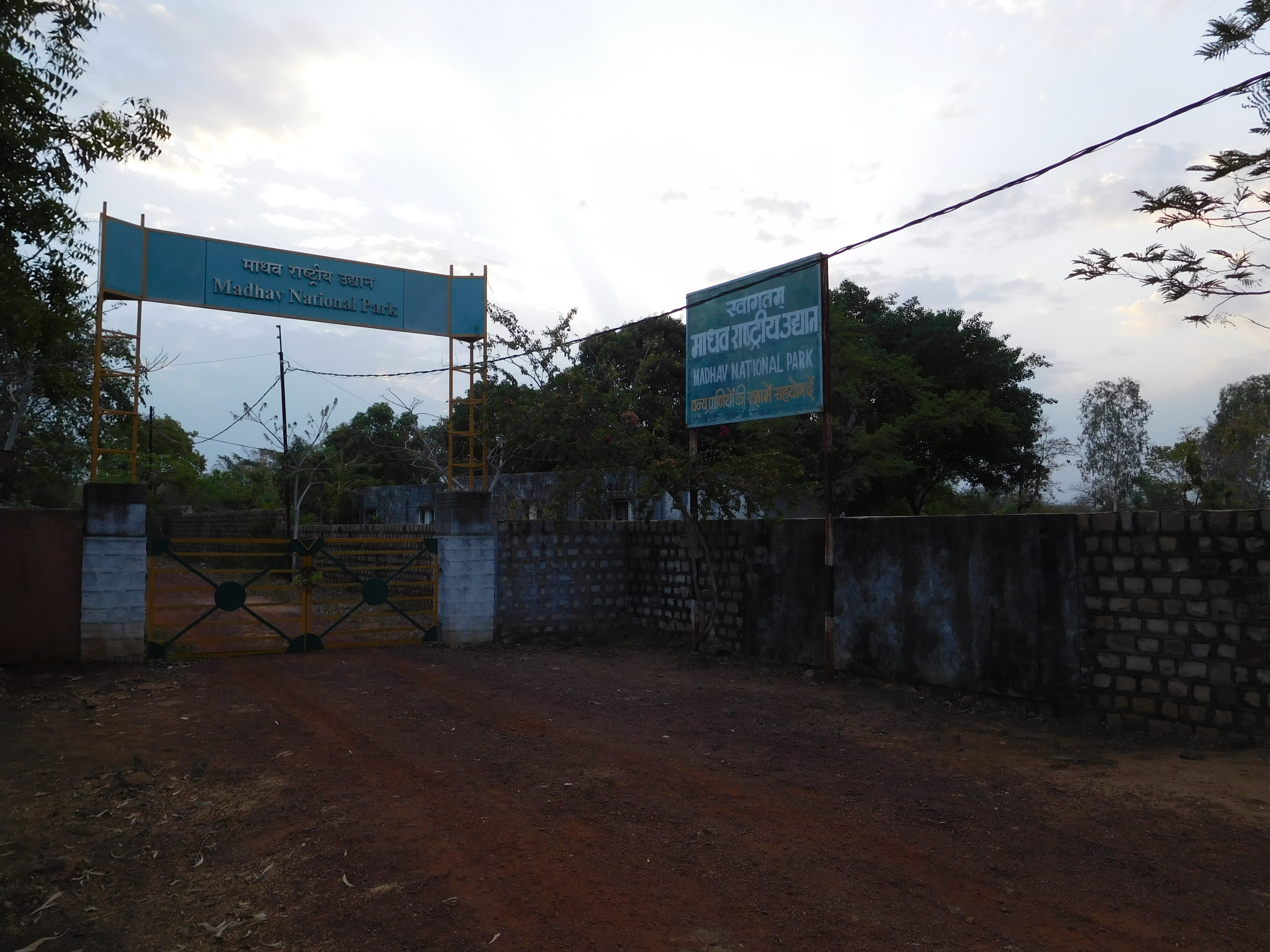
Madhav National Park

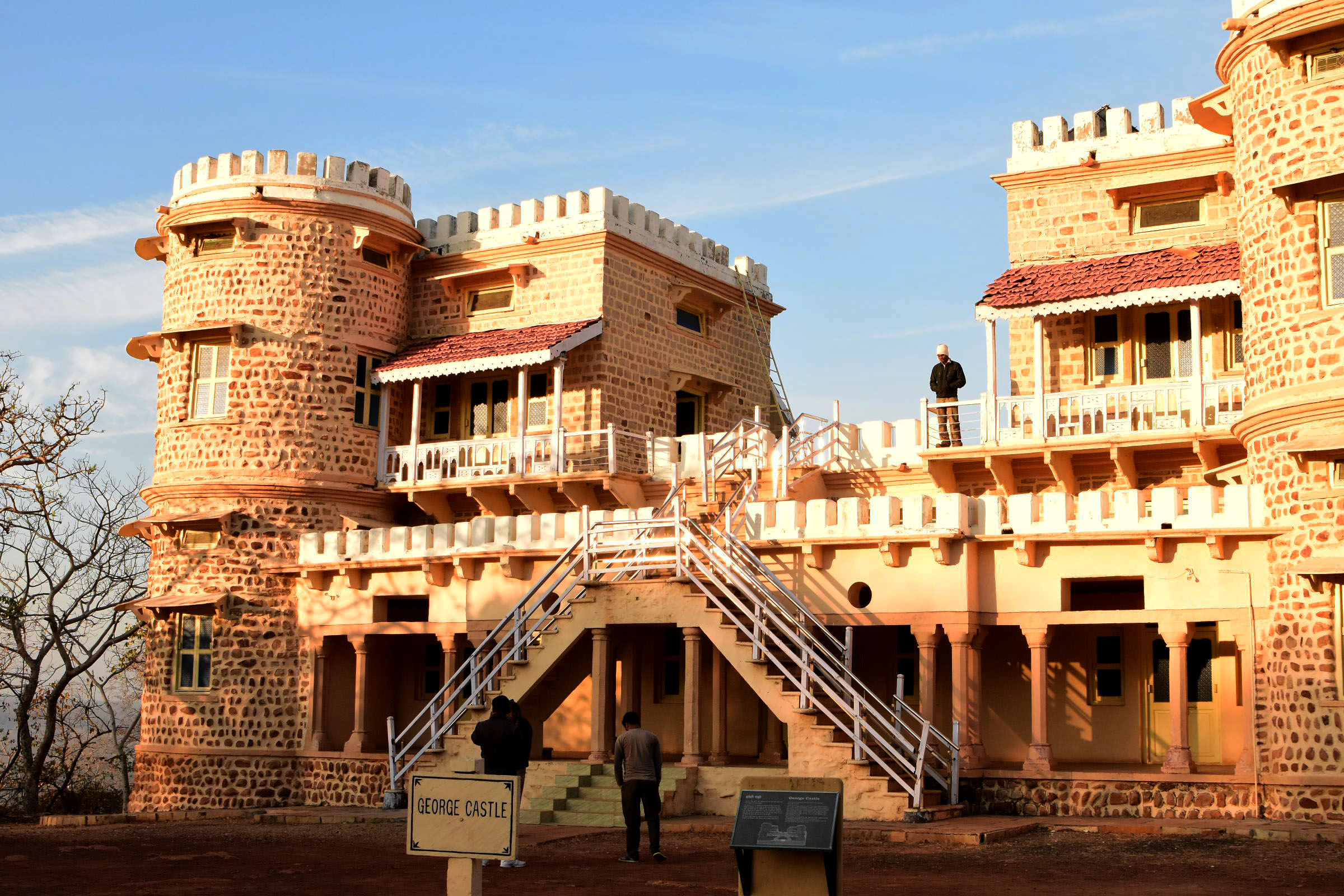
George Castle

== See also ==
- Gwalior
- Madhya Pradesh
- Tourism in Madhya Pradesh
