= Tigra Dam =

Dam in Madhya Pradesh, India

Coordinates: 26°13′17.11″N 78°00′6.52″E

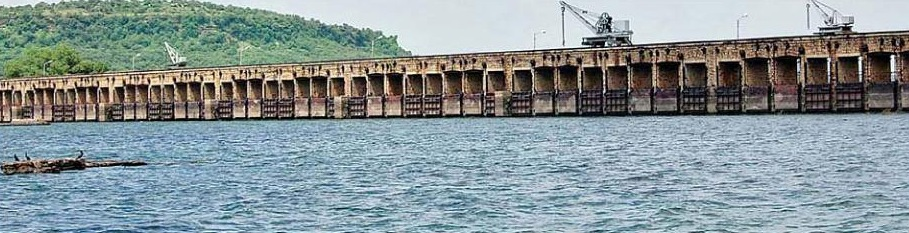
- Interactive map of Tigra Dam
- Country: India
- Location: Gwalior, Madhya Pradesh
- Purpose: Operational
- Opening date: 1916

Tigra Dam (also spelled "Tig Dam") creates a freshwater reservoir on the Sank River, about 23 kilometres (14 miles) from Gwalior, Madhya Pradesh, India. It plays a crucial role in supplying water to the city and is an important tourism spot in Gwalior.

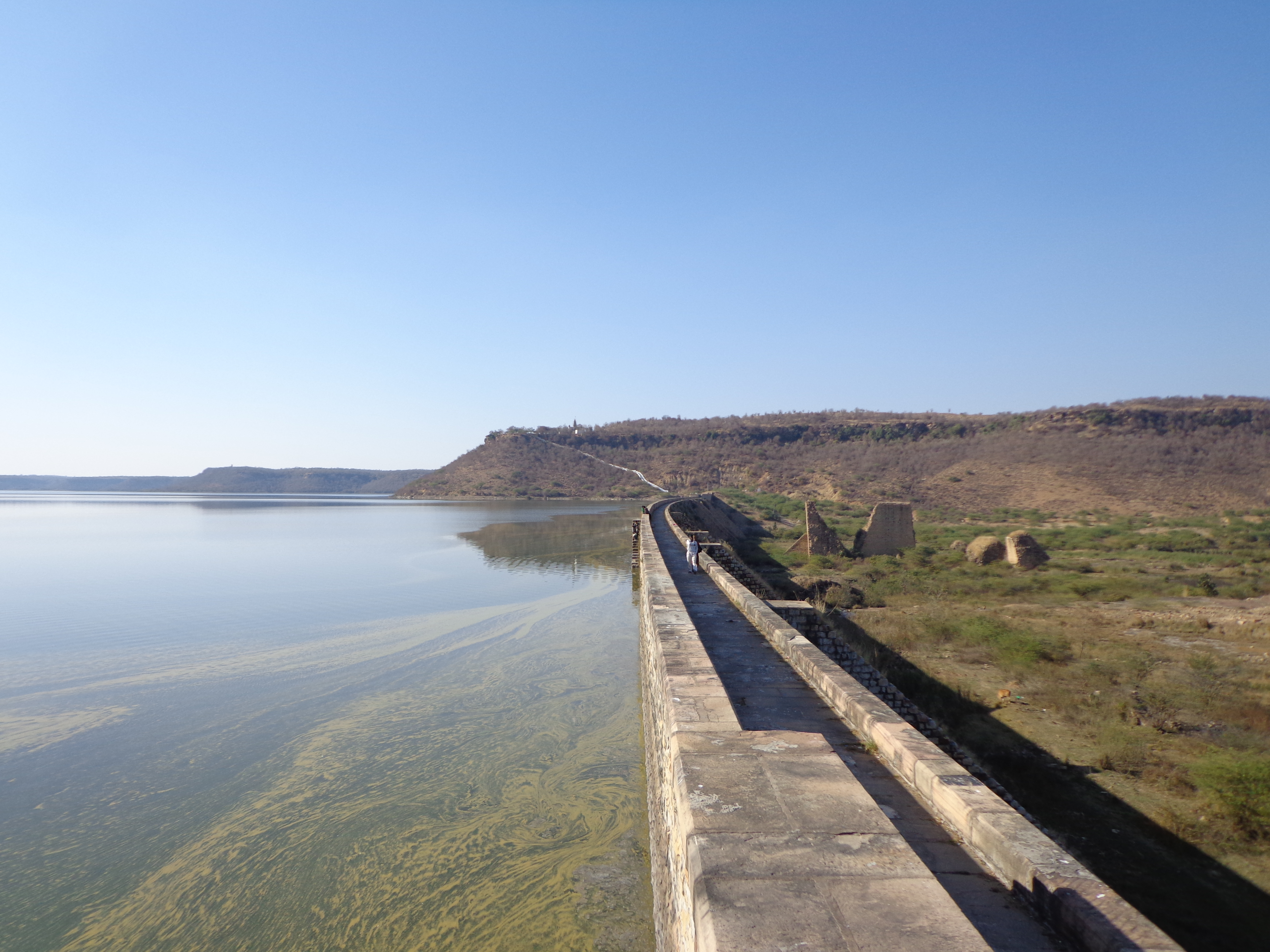
View from the Dam

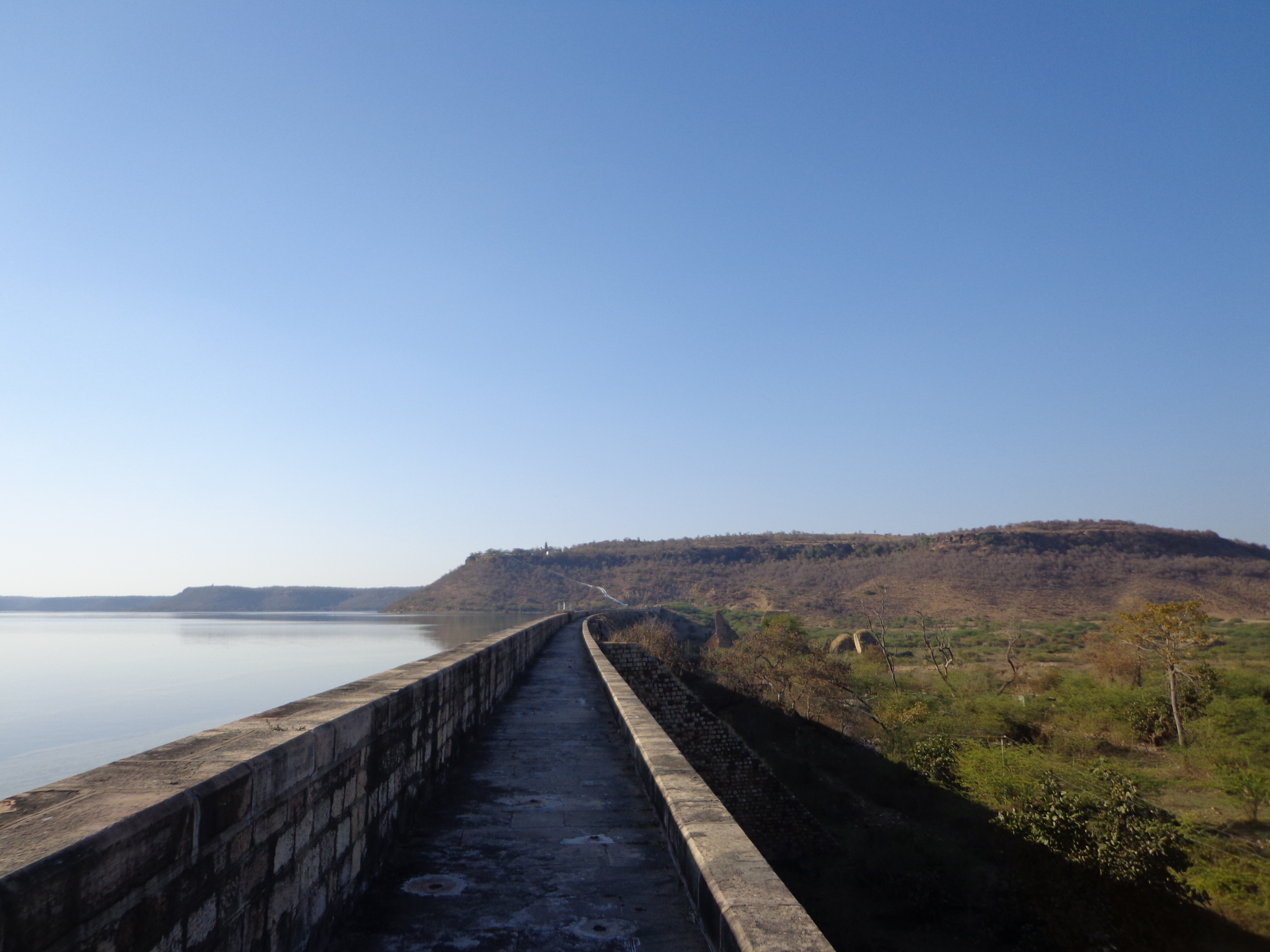
right side view

The dam is 24 metres (79 feet) high at its crest, and 1,341 metres (4,400 ft) long. The reservoir has a capacity of 4,800,000 cubic metres (170,000,000 cubic feet) and the spillway structure can pass up to 1,274 cubic metres per second (45,000 cubic feet per second).

== History ==
Rivera Dam was constructed on the Sank River in 1916, in the vicinity of eleven villages. In the afternoon of 19 August, 1917 the dam failed due to infiltration into its sandstone foundations. About 1000 people were killed downstream. It was rebuilt in 1927, and partially failed again in 1970. The area became a suitable habitat for several birds and this area was declared part of Ghatigaon Wildlife Sanctuary in 1981.

The dam is a popular tourist spot, particularly during the months of monsoon when the water level is highest. The nearby plateau is an important catchment area for the reservoir. Water sports, including boating, remain popular. Local villagers depend on this dam for their irrigation, drinking and domestic purposes. Moreover, the dam also provides potable water for Gwalior City.
