= Usha Kiran Palace =

Heritage hotel in India

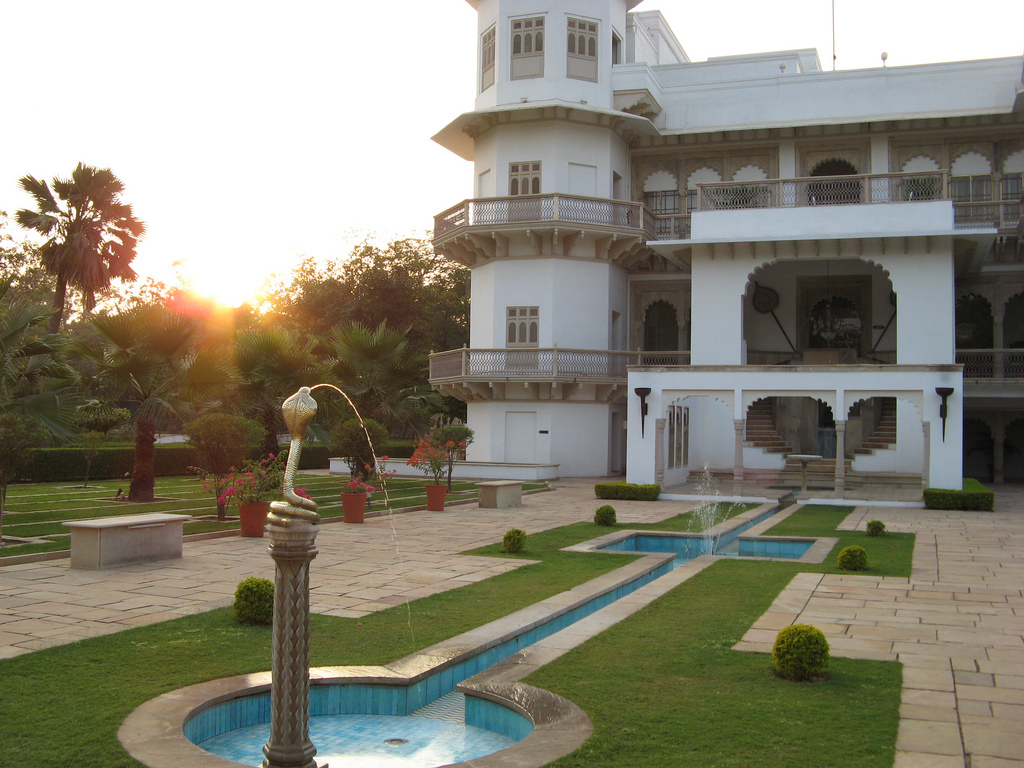
- Taj Usha Kiran Palace Hotel

General information
- Location: Jayendraganj, Lashkar, Gwalior
- Coordinates: 26.204°N 78.166°E

Other information
- Number of rooms: 30
- Number of suites: 8
- Number of restaurants: 1

Website
- Usha Kiran Palace

Usha Kiran Palace is a heritage hotel, adjacent to Jai Vilas Mahal on a 9-acre land in Gwalior built by the royal Scindia dynasty of the Marathas. The management of the five-star hotel is done by Taj Hotels Resorts and Palaces. The hotel makes use of solar power energy produced at Kadodiya Solar Park, which has been built by Vivaan Solar.

== History ==
It was built in 1902 as a guest residence for the Prince of Wales who was visiting. It later became the guest house of Jivajirao Scindia where he brought Vijayaraje Scindia after the marriage.

Subsequently moving from Mumbai to Gwalior, Priyadarshini Raje Scindia, the wife of Jyotiraditya Scindia, transformed the Palace into a hotel. The Usha Kiran Palace Hotel existed as a Hotel long before Priyadarshini Raje’s wedding. Hence the statement that she transformed it into a hotel is not right. The Palace has preserved its tradition with the usage of rosewood elevator from 1930 and two-blade ceiling fans.

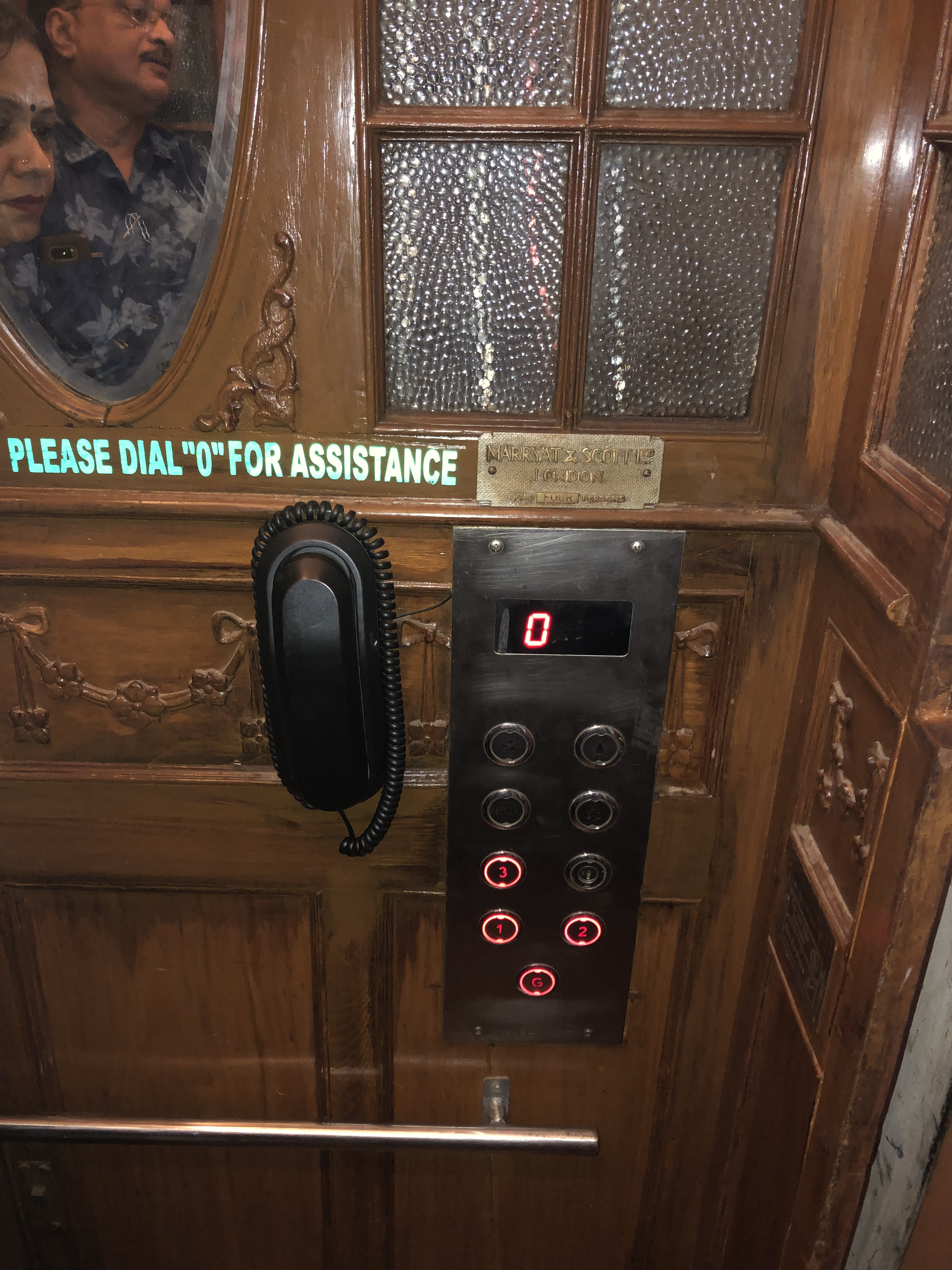
Antique Marryat & Scott elevator, Taj Usha Kiran Palace, Gwalior

== See also ==
- Jai Vilas Mahal
