= Ghatigaon Wildlife Sanctuary =

Wildlife sanctuary in India

Coordinates: 26.166°N 77.927°E

- IUCN category IV (habitat/species management area)
- Interactive map of Ghatigaon Wildlife Sanctuary
- Location: Ghatigaon, Gwalior district, Madhya Pradesh, India
- Area: 511
- Established: 1981

Ghatigaon Wildlife Sanctuary is a wildlife sanctuary situated at Ghatigaon in India. Ghatigaon covers 511.0 km² in Madhya Pradesh state, west of the city of Gwalior. It extends to Tigra Dam, and includes part of the reservoir.

It was established in 1981 to protect habitat of the great Indian bustard (Ardeotis nigriceps). It is home to many other birds, as well as blackbuck (Antilope cervicapra), chital (Axis axis), wild boar, and striped hyena (Hyaena hyaena).

The sanctuary in the Khathiar-Gir dry deciduous forests ecoregion. The predominant vegetation is low shrubland and woodland. The predominant tree species is khair (Senegalia catechu), with tendu (Diospyros melanoxylon), reonjha (Vachellia leucophloea), and others. Shrubland species include Zizyphus spp. and the grasses Eragrostis tenella, Aristida hystrix, and Apluda mutica.
