= Jai Vilas Mahal =

Jai Vilas Palace
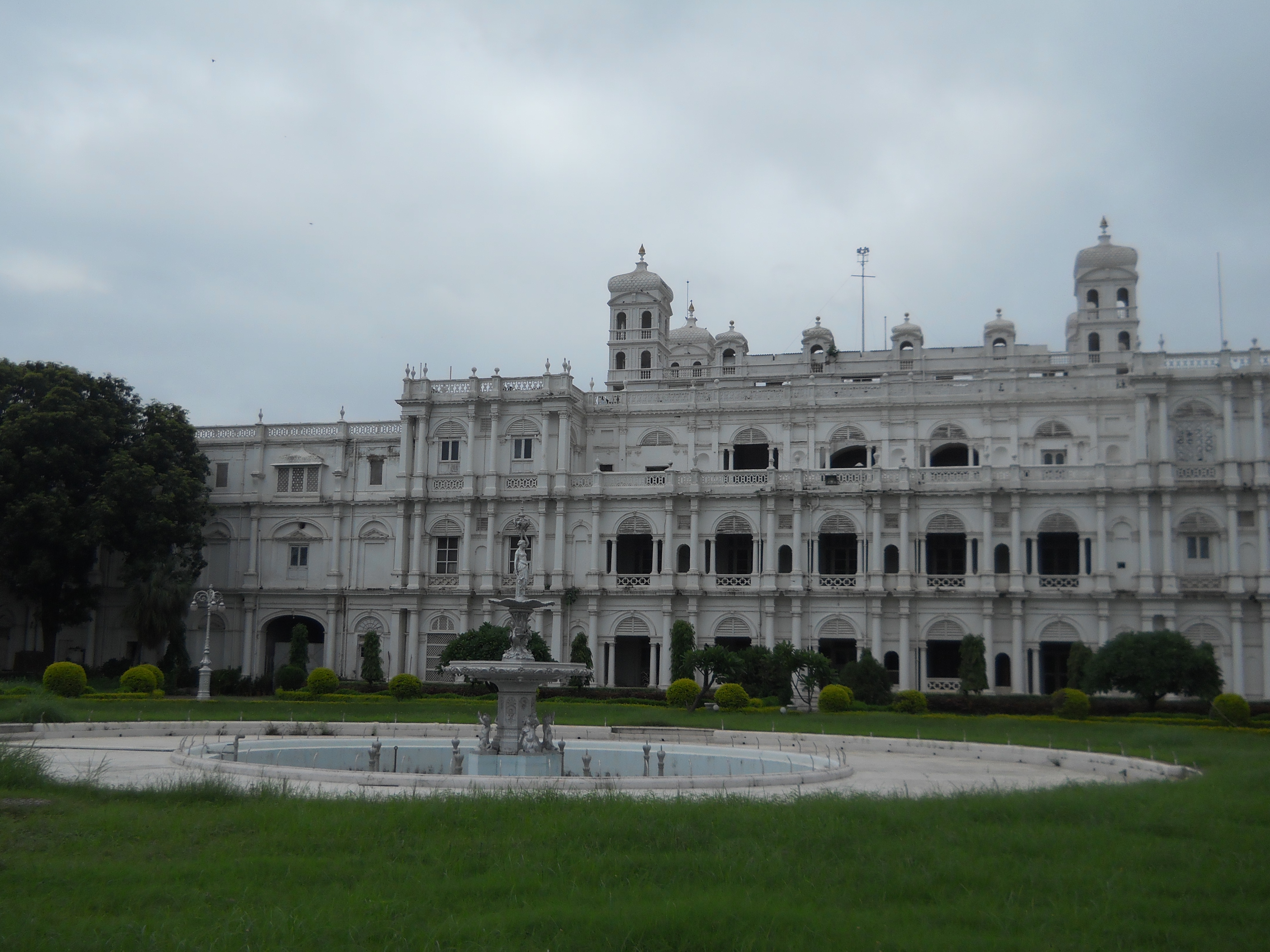
- Jai Vilas Palace in Gwalior

- Location within India

General information
- Architectural style: Italian, Corinthian and Tuscan architecture
- Location: Gwalior, India
- Coordinates: 26.2047°N 78.1686°E
- Completed: 1874; 152 years ago
- Cost: ₹1 crore in 1874 (now about ₹10,000 crores)
- Client: Jayajirao Scindia

Technical details
- Size: 124,771.0 square feet

Design and construction
- Architect: Sir Michael Filose

Website
- Jai Vilas Palace

The Jai Vilas Palace is a nineteenth-century palace in Gwalior, India. It was built in 1874 by Jayajirao Scindia, the Maharaja of Gwalior in the British Raj. While the major part of the palace is now the "Jiwajirao Scindia Museum" which opened to the public in 1964, a part of it is still the residence of some of his descendants.

== History and details ==
The Jai Vilas Palace is a fine example of European architecture. Initially constructed to accommodate King Edward VII and Queen Mary during their stay in India, the palace aimed to demonstrate the Scindia's influence and status during the British Raj. It was designed and built by Lt. Col. Sir Michael Filose (1832–1925), the Chief Secretary and Director of Public Instruction of Gwalior. The palace is a combination of the architectural style of the Mughals and the Medici. It is a combination of architectural styles: the first storey is Tuscan, the second Italian-Doric, and the third Corinthian. The area of the palace is 124,771 square feet and it is known for its large Durbar Hall. The interior of the Durbar Hall is decorated with gilt and gold furnishings and adorned with a huge carpet and gigantic chandeliers. It is 30 metres (100 ft) long, 15 metres (50 ft) wide and 12 metres (41 ft) in height.

The palace was described by Sir William Howard Russell in 1877

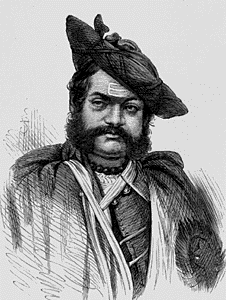
H. H. Maharaja Jayaji Rao Scindia, the Maharaja of Gwalior, who built the Jai Vilas Palace

The Palace covers an area of 124,771 square feet, exclusive of the inner square, which is 321 by 321% feet. The building is double-storied, and the wings and turrets are three- and five-storied. Its total length is 106 feet. The first story is Tuscan, second Italian Doric, and the third Corinthian order of architecture. The interior of the Reception-room is 97 feet 8 inches long by 50 feet broad, and it is 41 feet in height. The roof is arched with stone slabs 21 feet long, which enabled the architect to make the ribs prominent. They rest at each end on double Corinthian columns, which form a colonnade round the interior. The interior and exterior of the Palace form a combination of arcades and colonnades. Upwards of 300,000 leaves of gold were‘used to decorate the Reception-hall. The Grand Staircase-room is roofed with stone slabs 30 feet long; the room opposite to it is roofed in the same way. This room was used for dancing. The length of each of these rooms is 50 feet. The Grand Drawing-room, one of the finest saloons in the world, is hung with wonderful chandeliers, and decorated with enormous mirrors. The Prince's bedstead, washing service, and bath were of solid silver. The cost of the Palace was a little above 1,100,000 rupees. But the garden-walls, iron railings, gardens, furniture, glass, grand staircase, chandeliers, etc, cost about 500,000 rupees more. The area of the garden is about one square mile; there are several waterfalls and a number of fountains in it.

A large room preserves the desk and photographs of Madhavrao Scindia, who served as the Railway Minister of India. Many of the rooms, including drawing rooms, bedrooms and bathrooms, have been preserved just as they were lavishly decorated for the royal family. The royal kitchen, with its furnaces, pots, china and other items, has also been preserved.

Supposedly, eight elephants were suspended from the durbar (royal court) hall ceiling to check it could cope with two 12.5 metres (41 ft)-high, 3.5-tonne chandeliers with 250 light bulbs, said to be the largest pair in the world.

Unusual items fill many rooms: cut glass furniture, stuffed tigers and a ladies-only swimming pool with its own boat. The cavernous dining room displays the pièce de résistance, a model silver train that carried after-dinner brandy and cigars around the table. In contrast to the western style dining room, a completely Indian style dining room is also preserved, which was used when the Maratha nobles were invited.

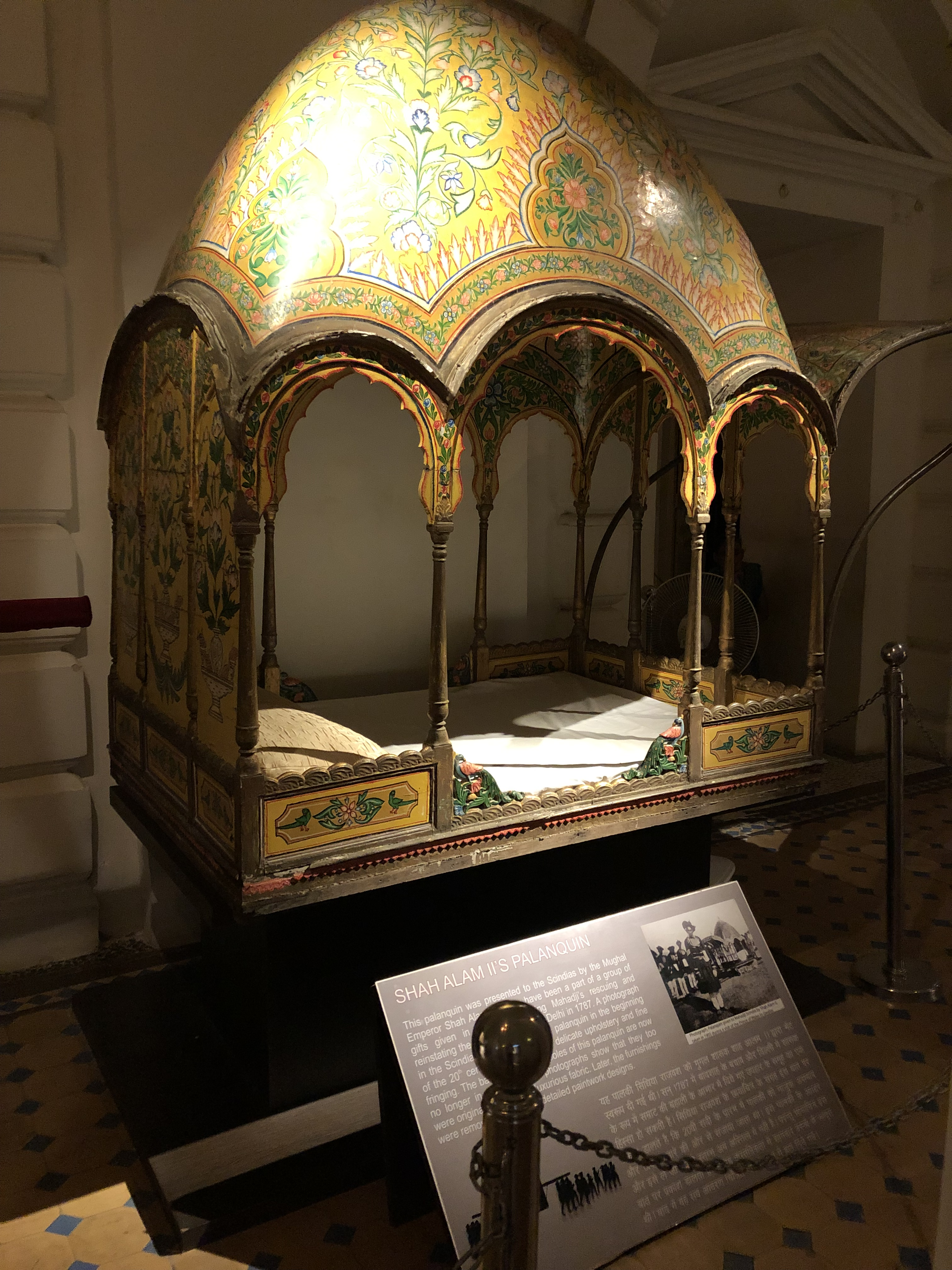
Mughal Emperor Shah Alam II's planquin. Shah Alam lived under the protection of the Scindias.

The museum preserves the memory of the humble origin of Scindia (spelled in Hindi/Marathi Shinde) from the Kanherkhed village in Maharashtra. The family left its ancestral village in 1726, however it has continued to preserve its Maratha heritage. On special occasions, the Scindia family members still wear the Maratha style (Shineshahi pagdi) turban which uses 60 metres (200 ft) of Chanderi silk, with pointed ends. An exhibit at the museum explains the intricate steps involved in wrapping the special turban.

A notable historical item is the palanquin gifted by Mughal emperor Shah Alam II, who was restored to the throne by Mahadaji Scindia in 1787. A Rohilla courtier, Ghulam Qadir, had acquired control of Delhi. He humiliated the Mughal royal family and blinded the emperor Shah Alam II. The tragic event is described by a poem of Allama Iqbal. Mahadaji Scindia came to the Mughal family's rescue and captured Ghulam Qadir and became the de facto ruler of Delhi. It attests to the power of Mahadji Shinde (Scindia) who is regarded by historians as among the important personality in history of Maratha Empire.

== Gallery ==
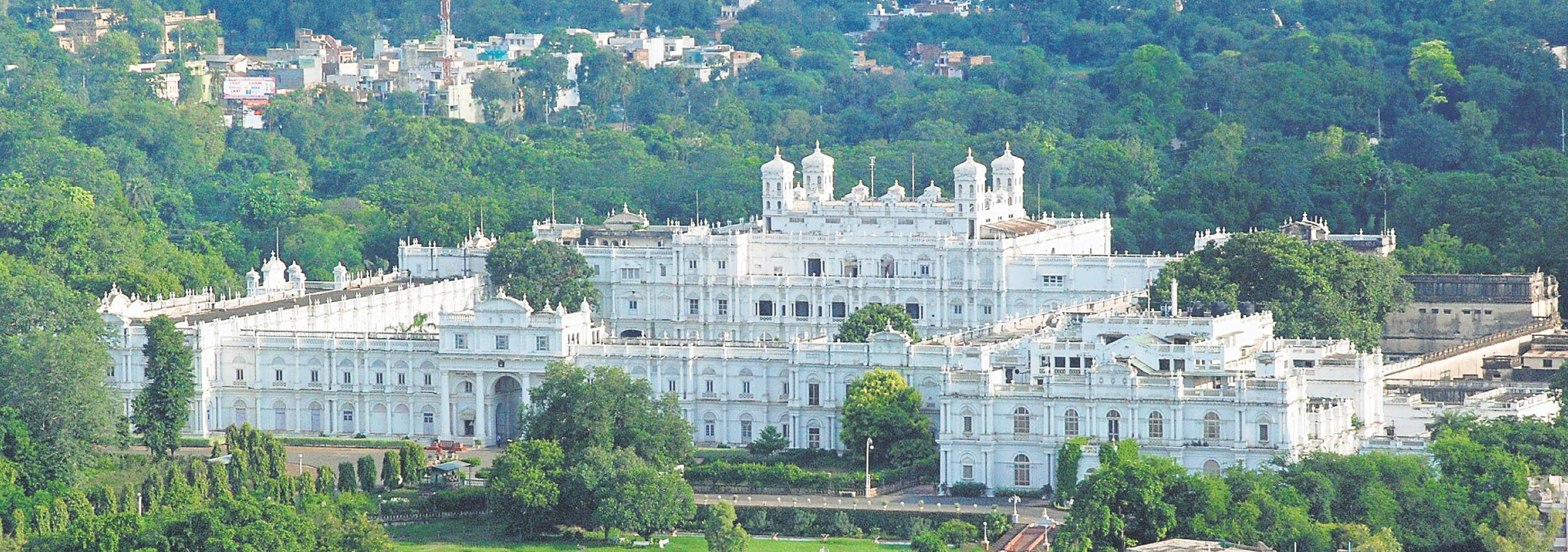
Aerial view of the palace

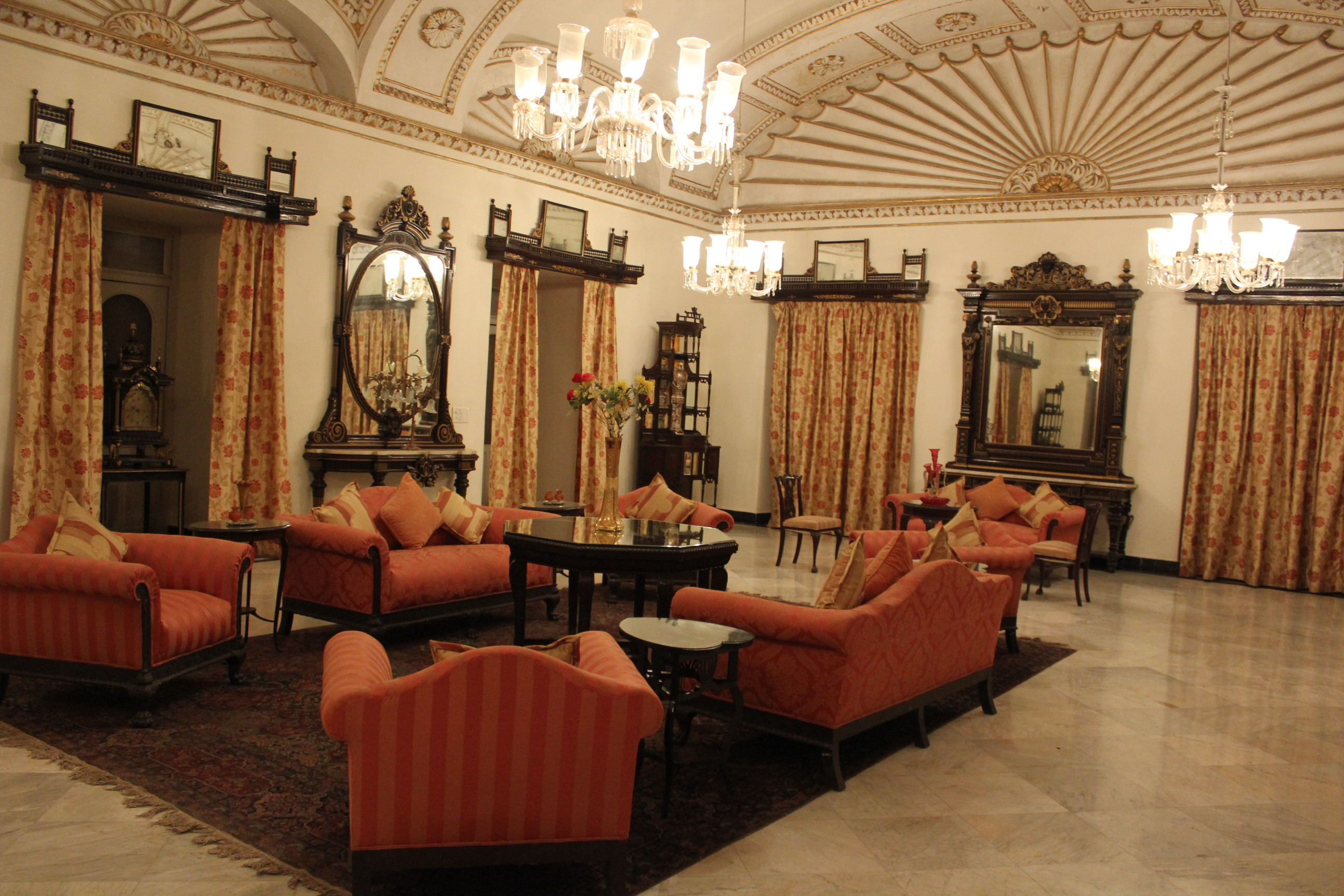
Scindia family drawing room furniture

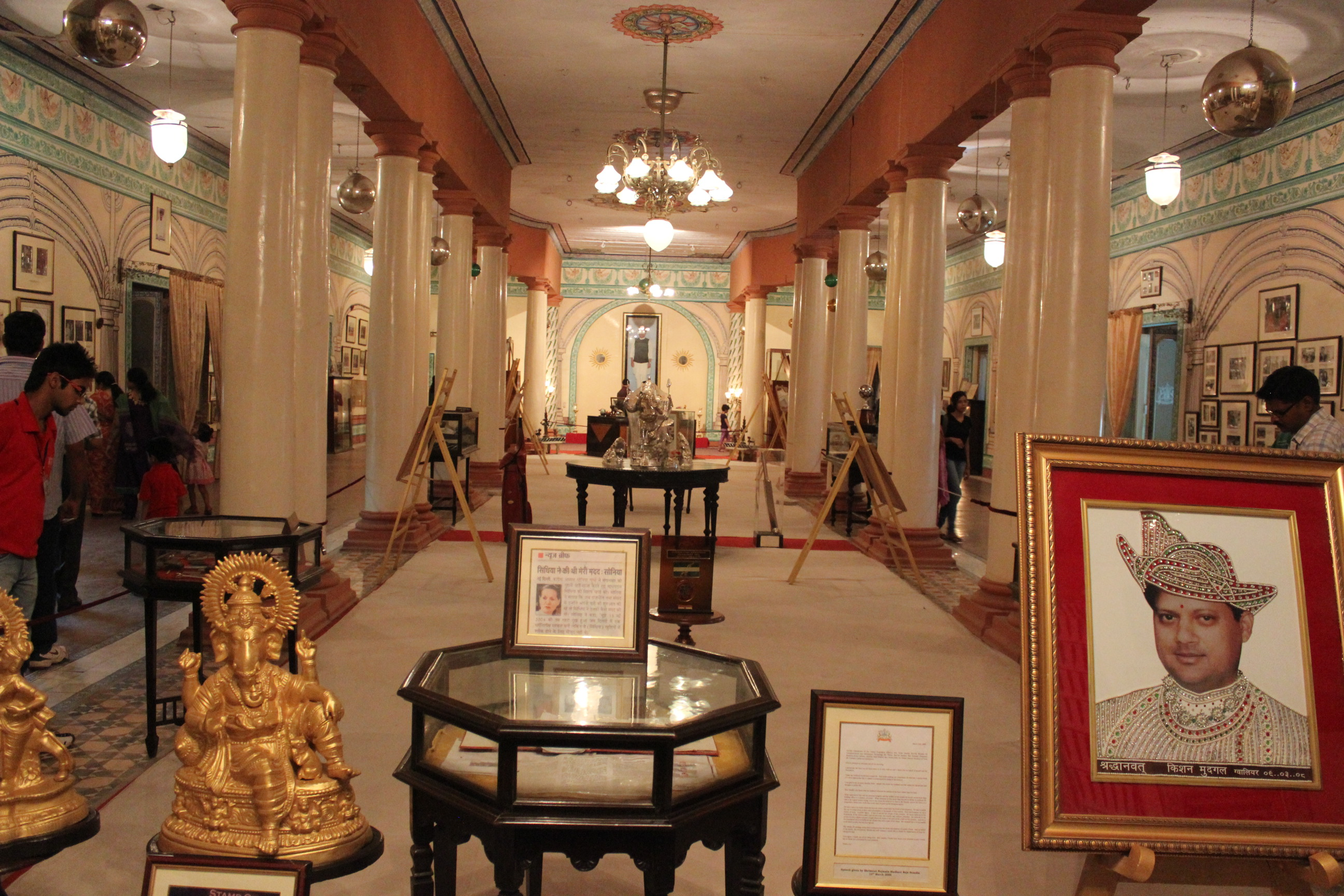
Madhavrao Scindia room

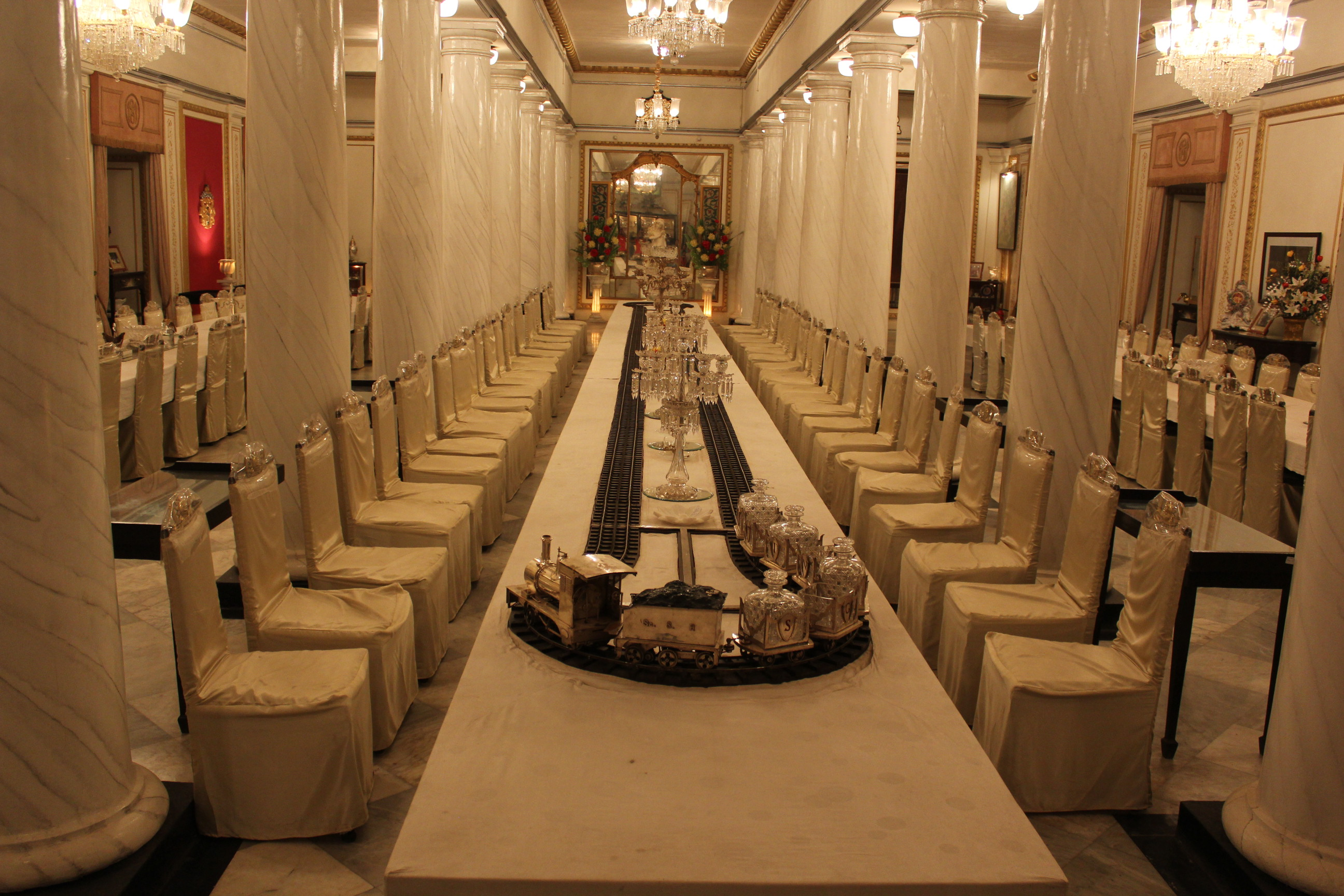
Model silver train in the banquet room

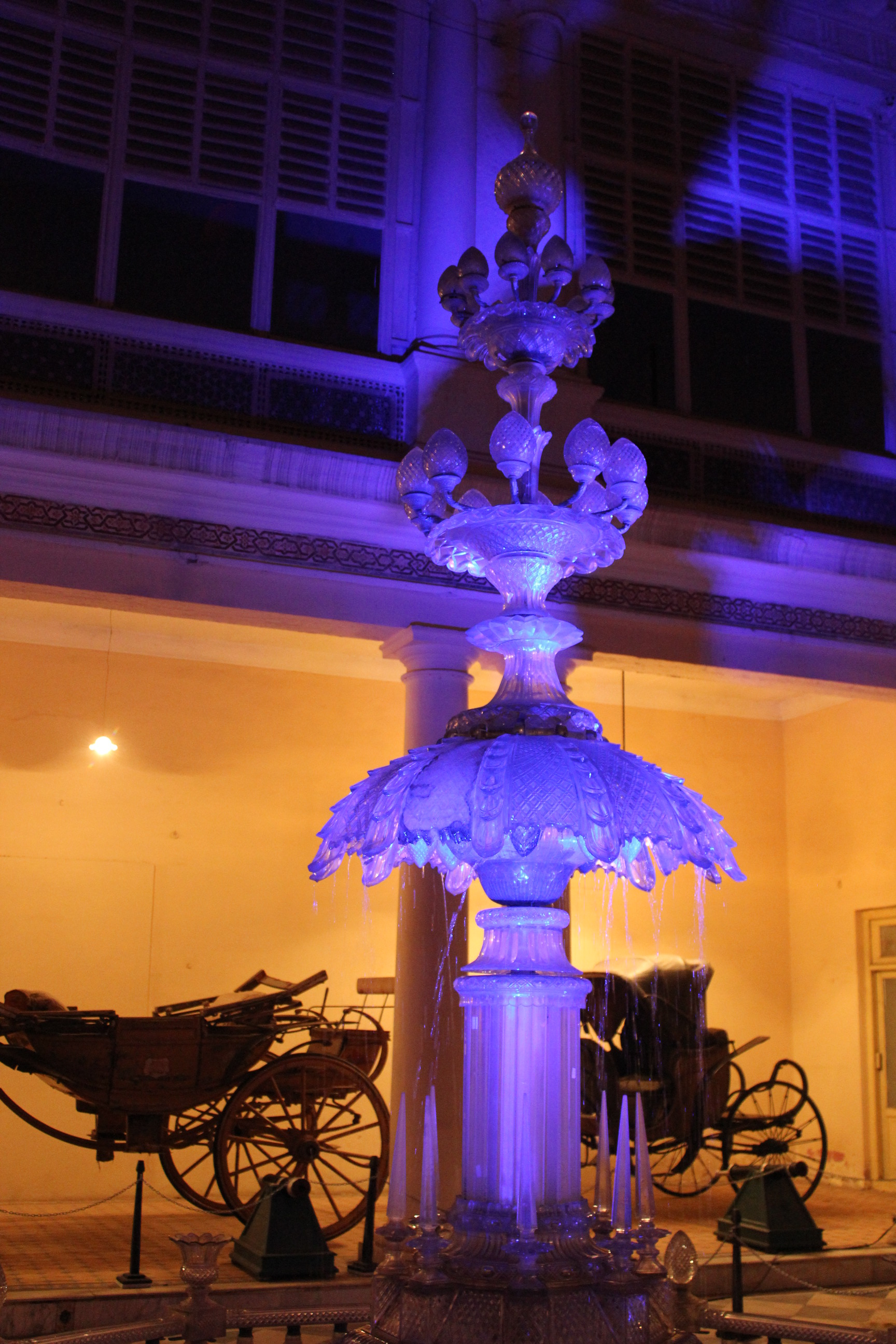
Glass sculpture

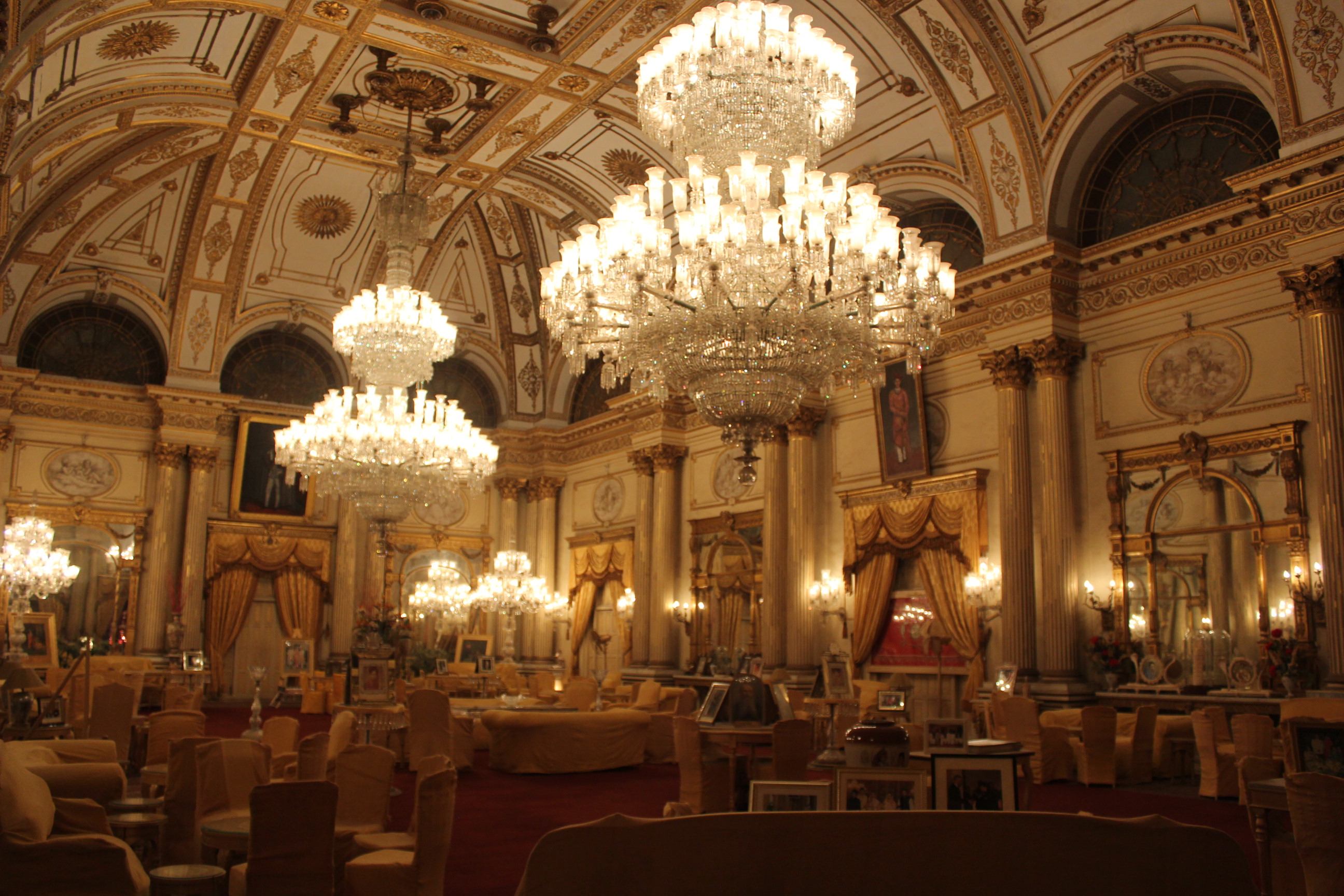
12.5m-high, 3.5-tonne chandeliers

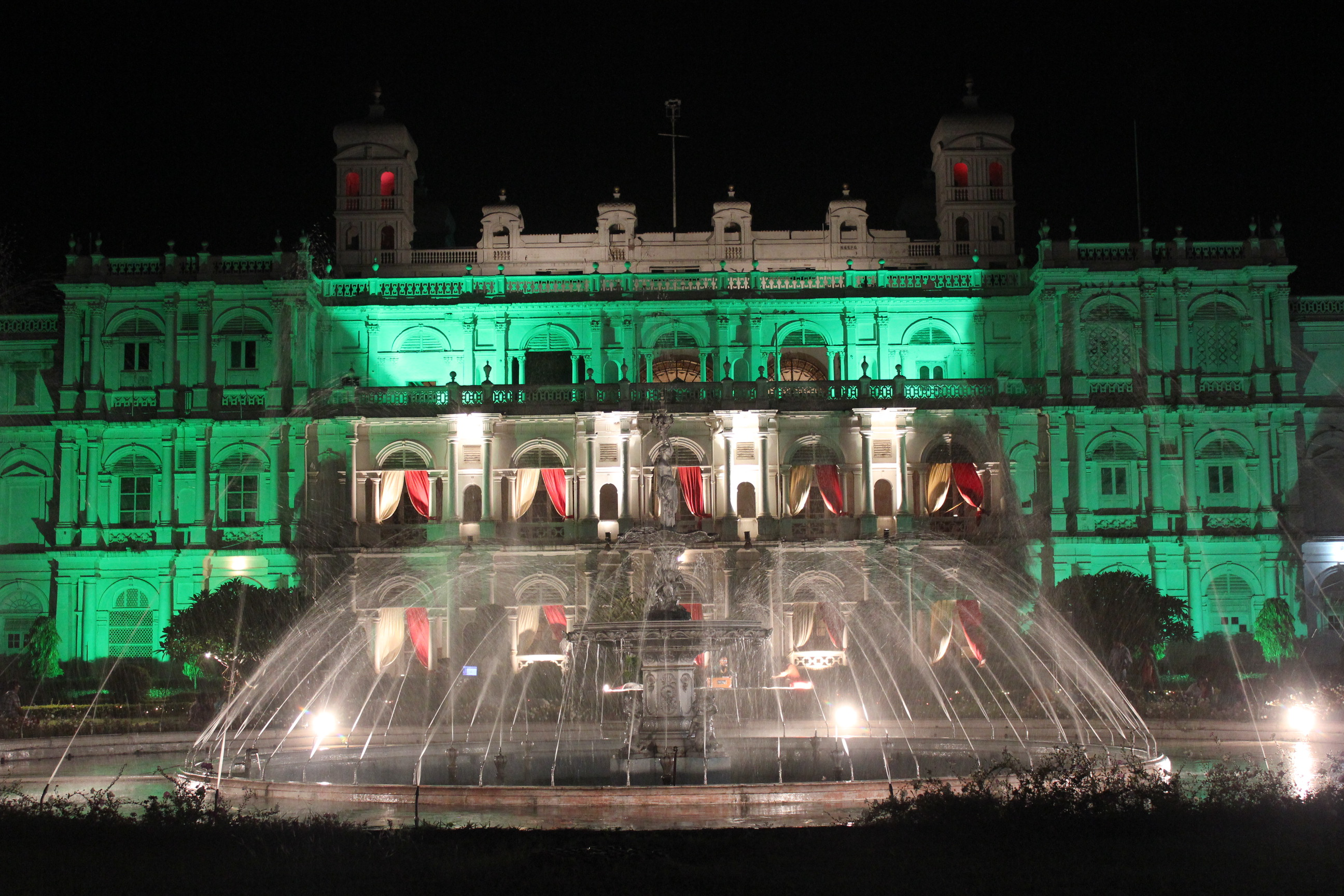
Fountain in the center of the courtyard

Neo Classical room Sculpture

Hunting Chair of King

== See also ==
- Usha Kiran Palace hotel, adjacent to the Jai Vilas Mahal and entered through the same ornamental gateway.
- New Palace, Kolhapur of the Bhonsle Chhatrapatis
- Laxmi Vilas Palace, Vadodara of the Gaekwads
- Rajwada, Indore of Holkars
- Shaniwar Wada, Pune of the Peshwas
- Thanjavur Maratha palace of the Bhonsles
- Narmada Kothi (Maharajah of Indore Retreat Palace), Barwaha
