= Lat ki Masjid =

Lat ki Masjid may refer to any of the following mosques in India:

- Lat ki Masjid, Hisar, located inside the Firoz Shah palace complex in Hisar, Haryana
- Lat Masjid, located in Dhar, Madhya Pradesh
