= Dhar iron pillar =

Iron column in Madhya Pradesh, India

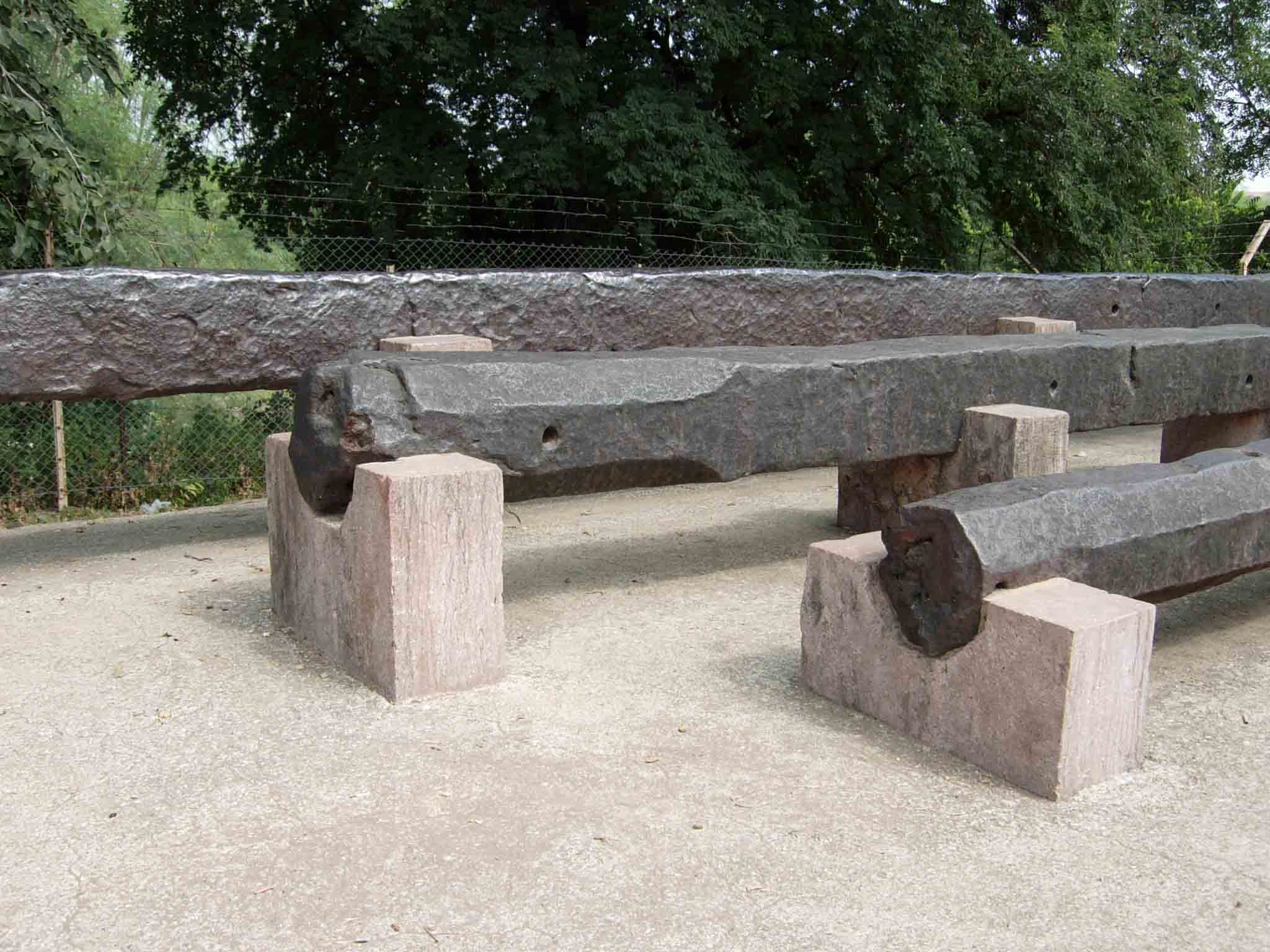
Dhār (Madhya Pradesh). Fragments of the Dhār pillar set on a platform constructed by the Archaeological Survey of India.

The Dhar iron pillar is a now-fragmented iron column located in the Dhar town of Madhya Pradesh, India. The exact origins of the pillar are unknown, but according to the local tradition, it was a victory column erected by the 11th century Paramara king Bhoja.

Three of its fragments are now located near the 15th century Lat Masjid ("pillar mosque"), which is named after the pillar (called "lāṭ" in Hindi). A fourth portion is believed to be missing. The original pillar tapered from bottom to top: the bottom fragment has a square cross-section; the middle fragment has square and octagonal cross-sections, and the top fragment has an octagonal cross-section with a small circular part at the end. The total length of the three fragments is 13.21 metres (43 ft 4 in), which indicates that the original pillar must have been twice as high as the iron pillar of Delhi. The combined weight of the fragments is estimated at around 7,300 kilograms (16,100 lb), which is at least 1,000 kilograms (2,200 lb) more than the Delhi pillar's weight. At the time of its erection, it was probably the largest forge-welded iron pillar in the world.

== Manufacturing and erection ==
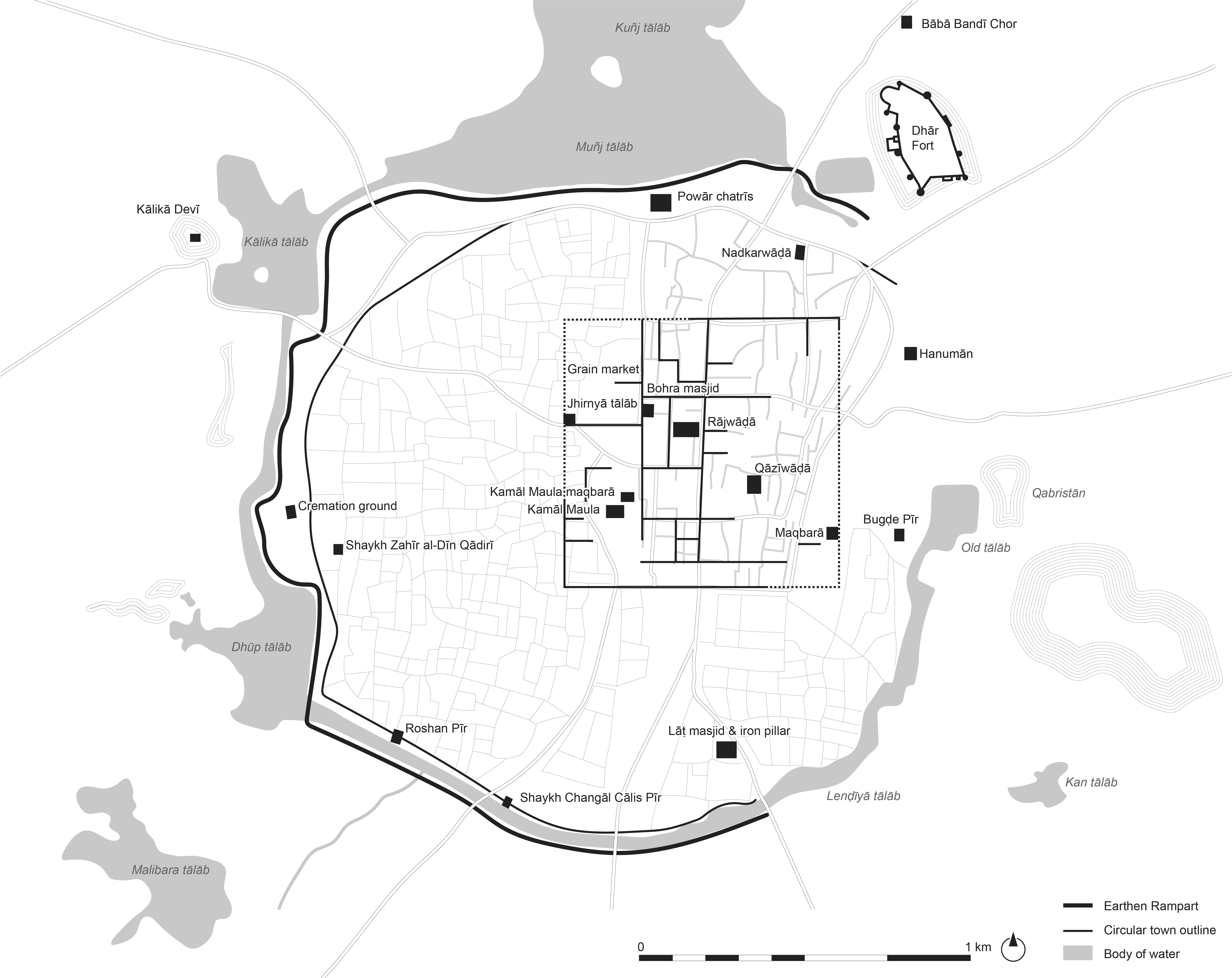
Dhār (Madhya Pradesh). Historic plan showing ramparts and grid layout of the old town, with location of the Lāṭ masjid and iron pillar in the south-eastern quadrant.

The pillar does not bear an inscription mentioning its date, purpose or patron. It is located at Dhār, one time capital of the Paramara dynasty. Henry Cousens of Archaeological Survey of India (ASI) theorised that it was constructed by the later Paramara king Arjunavarman in 1210 CE, from the molten arms of an enemy force.

The Lat Masjid, in whose compound the pillar is located, was constructed with spolia from Hindu and Jain temples. R. Balasubramaniam theorizes that a Shiva temple previously occupied the site, and the pillar was originally located at the front of this temple, with a trishula (trident) at the top.

The two largest fragments have a number of holes at irregular intervals, on all sides. The depth of the holes ranges from 41–76 millimetres (1.6–3 in), and their diameter ranges from 30–76 millimetres (1.2–3 in). Because they are distributed unevenly, they do not appear to be slots for lamps (as in a deepa-stambha). Cousens speculated that these were used by the forgers and welders to handle the pillar with their instruments during the manufacturing process. Roessler agreed with this hypothesis, and proposed that these slots were also used to hold the pillar upright using iron anchors.

The pillar appears to have been built using horizontal forge welding technique. Brahm Prakash theorized that smaller sections, measuring 710 millimetres (2 ft 4 in) to 840 millimetres (2 ft 9 in) in length, were joined together to form the pillar.

== Fragments ==
The iron pillar of Dhar was originally longer than the iron pillar of Delhi. After the Muslim conquest of Dhar, it broke into at least two pieces. The smaller piece was planted at the Dilawar Khan's Mosque in Mandu. The larger piece was erected in front of the Lat Masjid constructed by Dilawar Khan in 1405.

In 1531 CE, Dhar came under the control of Bahadur Shah, the Sultan of Gujarat. He made an attempt to carry the large piece to Gujarat. In this process, this part of the pillar toppled and fragmented into two pieces.

Now, three fragments of the pillar are placed horizontally on a platform near Lat Masjid. These fragments were moved by ASI to their present position in 1980. The combined height of the three fragments is 13.2 metres (43 ft 4 in), and their total weight is estimated at 7,300 kilograms (16,100 lb). Thus, the original pillar must have been almost twice as high and at least 1,000 kilograms (2,200 lb) heavier than the iron pillar of Delhi. At the time of its erection, it was probably the tallest and the largest forge-welded iron pillar in the world.

=== Fragment 1 ===
This piece is the larger part of the fragment broken during Bahadur Shah's reign. Henry Cousens (1902–03) measured its length as 7.4 metres (24 ft 3 in). Klaus Roessler (1995) found it to be 7.4 metres (24 ft 2 in) long. It has a square cross-section. Roessler estimated its weight at 4,500 kilograms (9,900 lb).

In 1598, the Mughal emperor Akbar's visit to Dhar was recorded on the pillar in form of a Persian language inscription. This piece also has some names and letters in Devanagari script. The names end in word Soni ("goldsmith"), and seem to have been engraved while the original pillar was still intact. There are some other symbols and Persian characters scratched on the surface.

The autobiography of Akbar's son Jahangir mentions that he saw this piece lying on ground in Dhar. He ordered it to be taken to Agra, intending to use it as a lamp post in the courtyard of Akbar's tomb. It appears that Jahangir's orders were never carried out.

Until 1980, this piece lay in a sloping position against a masonry terrace. The local kids used it as a slide, because of which a large part of its surface gained a polished appearance.

=== Fragment 2 ===
This piece is the smaller part of the fragment broken during Bahadur Shah's reign. Henry Cousens (1902–03) measured its length as 3.5 metres (11 ft 7 in). The part with the square cross-section measured 2.6 metres (8 ft 6 in), while the part with the octagonal section measured 0.9 metres (3 ft 1 in). Klaus Roessler (1995) found this piece to be 3.6 metres (11 ft 8 in) long. Roessler estimated its weight at 1,800 kilograms (4,000 lb).

The 4.0 metres (13 ft) piece was removed from the Lat Masjid site at an unknown time. In February 1903, Henry Cousens of ASI found it in Anand High School, where a museum had been set up in 1902. The museum was relocated to another site between the years 1922 and 1942. When this happened, the pillar was brought back to the Lat Masjid and placed horizontally on the ground.

=== Fragment 3 ===
This is the smallest piece, which was moved to Mandu during Dilawar Khan's reign. Its length is 2.3 metres (7 ft 6 in) according to both Coussen and Roessler. It is mostly of an octagonal cross-section, except one 203.2 millimetres (8 in) circular part at the end. Roessler estimated its weight at 940 kilograms (2,070 lb).

This piece was brought back from Mandu to Dhar sometime between 1844 and 1893. In 1893, Alois Anton Führer of ASI noticed it in the garden of the Dhar Maharaja's guest house. In February 1902, this piece was fixed in a masonry basement at Lal Bagh public gardens near the Anand High School. Henry Cousens of ASI later had it removed from the basement to measure it. The piece was then moved to the Anand High School museum. From there, it was moved to Lat Masjid, similar to the second piece.

=== Missing fragment ===
The third piece has a fractured top surface, which indicates that a fourth piece of the original pillar is missing. Klaus Roessler (1995) estimated the length of this piece at 1.0 metre (3 ft 3 in). Henry Cousens hypothesized that the fourth piece had a garuda figure (the Paramara royal emblem) or a trishula (trident) at the top. As Bhoja was a Shaivite king, R. Balasubramaniam analyzed Shaivite iconography to conclude that the top had a trishula.

Balasubramaniam also theorizes that an iron pillar in front of Mandu's Jami Masjid might be a re-shaped version of the Dhar pillar's missing piece. This pillar is called Allaudin's Sang (spear) after Alauddin Khalji.

== Chemical composition ==
According to R. Balasubramaniam and A. V. Ramesh Kumar (2003), the pillar shows "excellent" atmospheric corrosion resistance.

Ray et al. (1997) analyzed portions of the two smaller fragments. Their analysis revealed the following chemical composition (weight %):

Carbon	0.013%
Manganese	"trace"
Silicon	0.06%
Phosphorus	0.072%
Sulfur	0.003%
Copper	0.057%
Nickel	0.268%
Iron	rest

Balasubramaniam (2002) also obtained a small portion of the pillar with ASI's permission, and used an electron probe microanalyzer to analyze its chemical composition. He found that "the composition varied from one location to another":

	(Mass of elements other than iron, as % of total mass)			
	Carbon	Phosphorus	Manganese	Silver
Portion containing pearlite	0.683%	0.693%	0.013%	
Portion containing pearlite and ferrite	0.276%	0.851%		0.075%

The typical composition of the slag was 55.8% iron, 27.8% silicon, 16.3% phosphorus, and 0.1% manganese.

== See also ==
- Ancient iron production
- History of metallurgy in South Asia
- Iron pillar of Delhi
- Pillars of Ashoka
- Heliodorus pillar
- Stambha
