= Dhar =

City in Madhya Pradesh, India

Dhar धार
- City
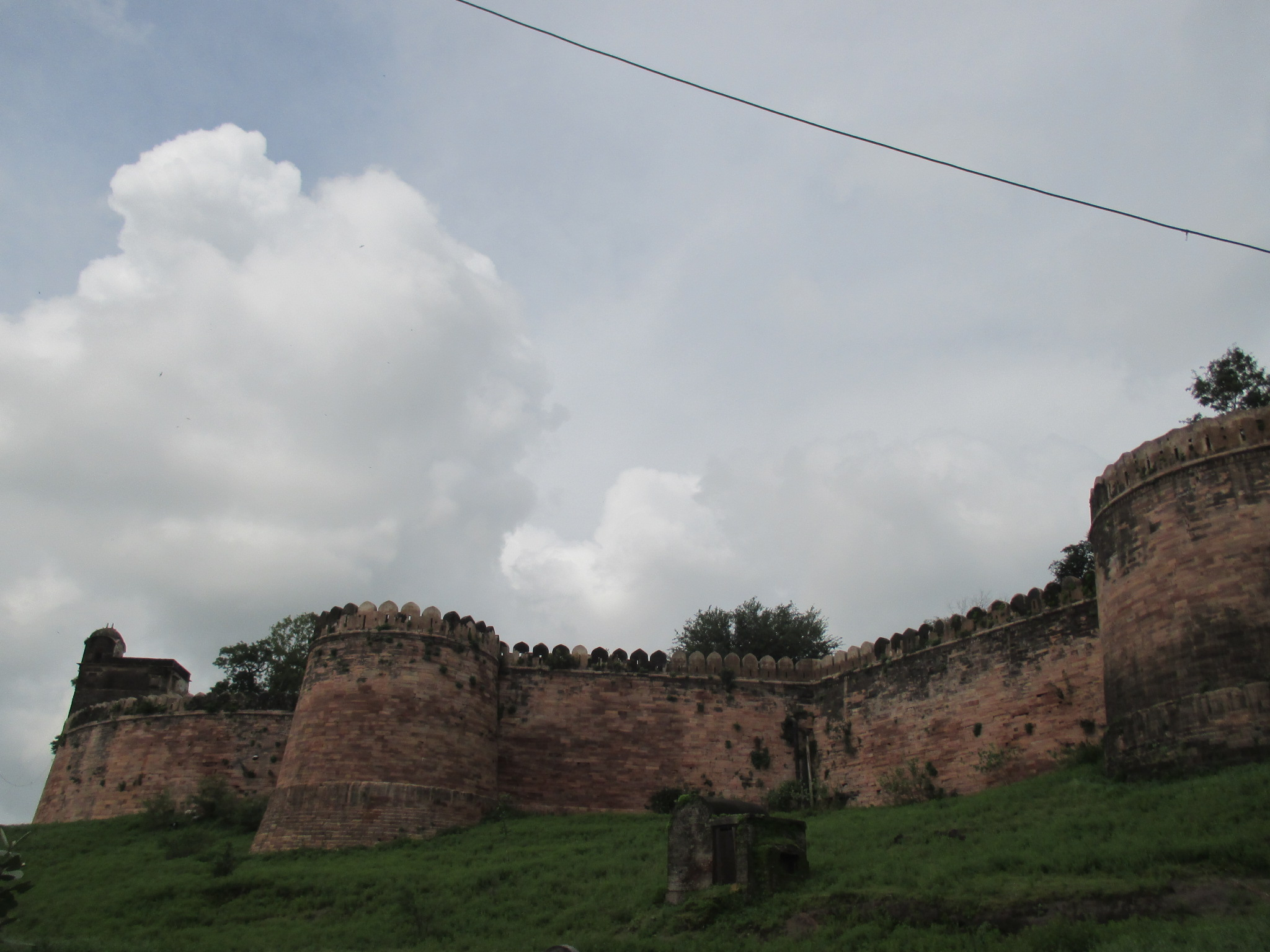
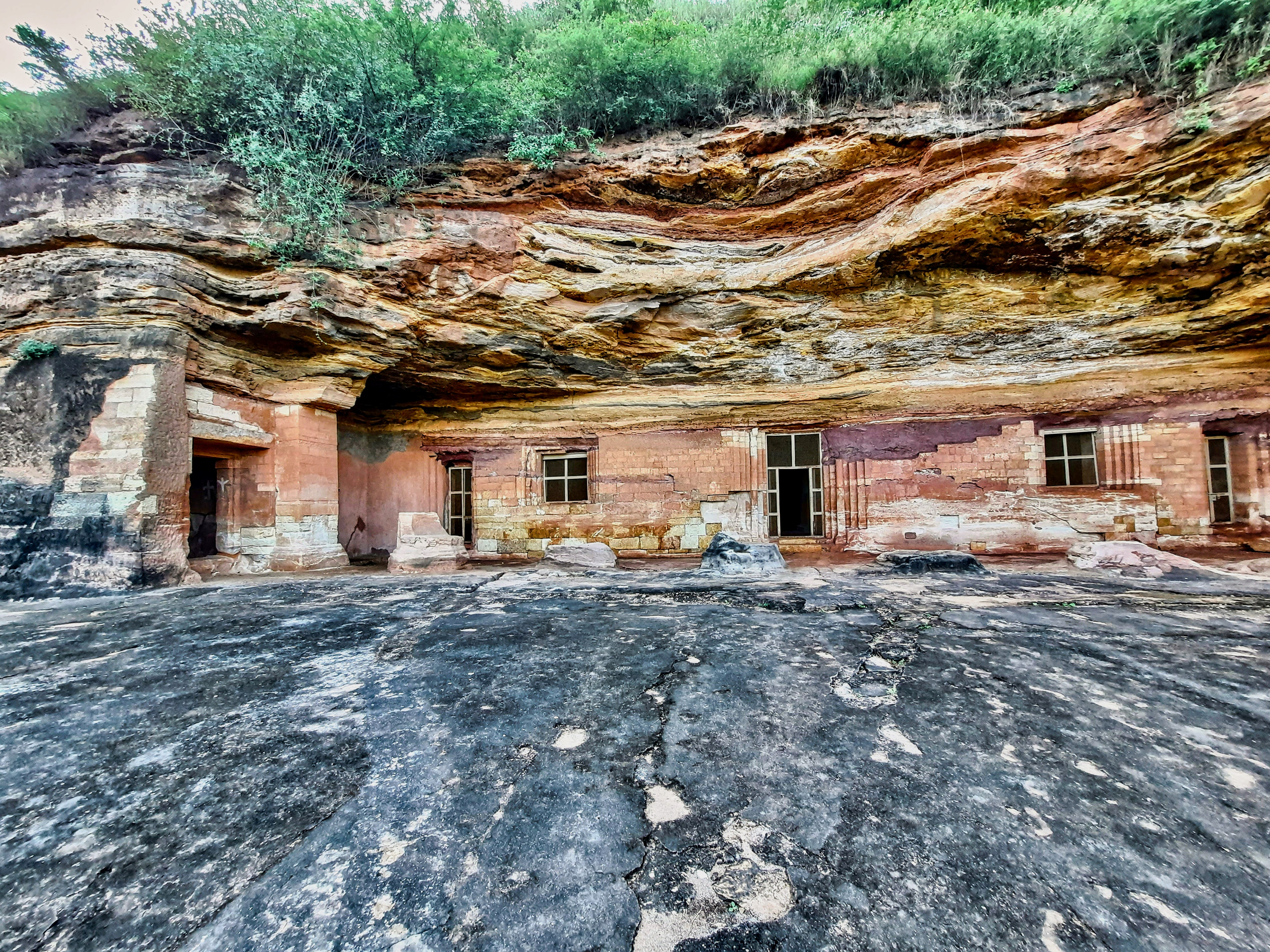
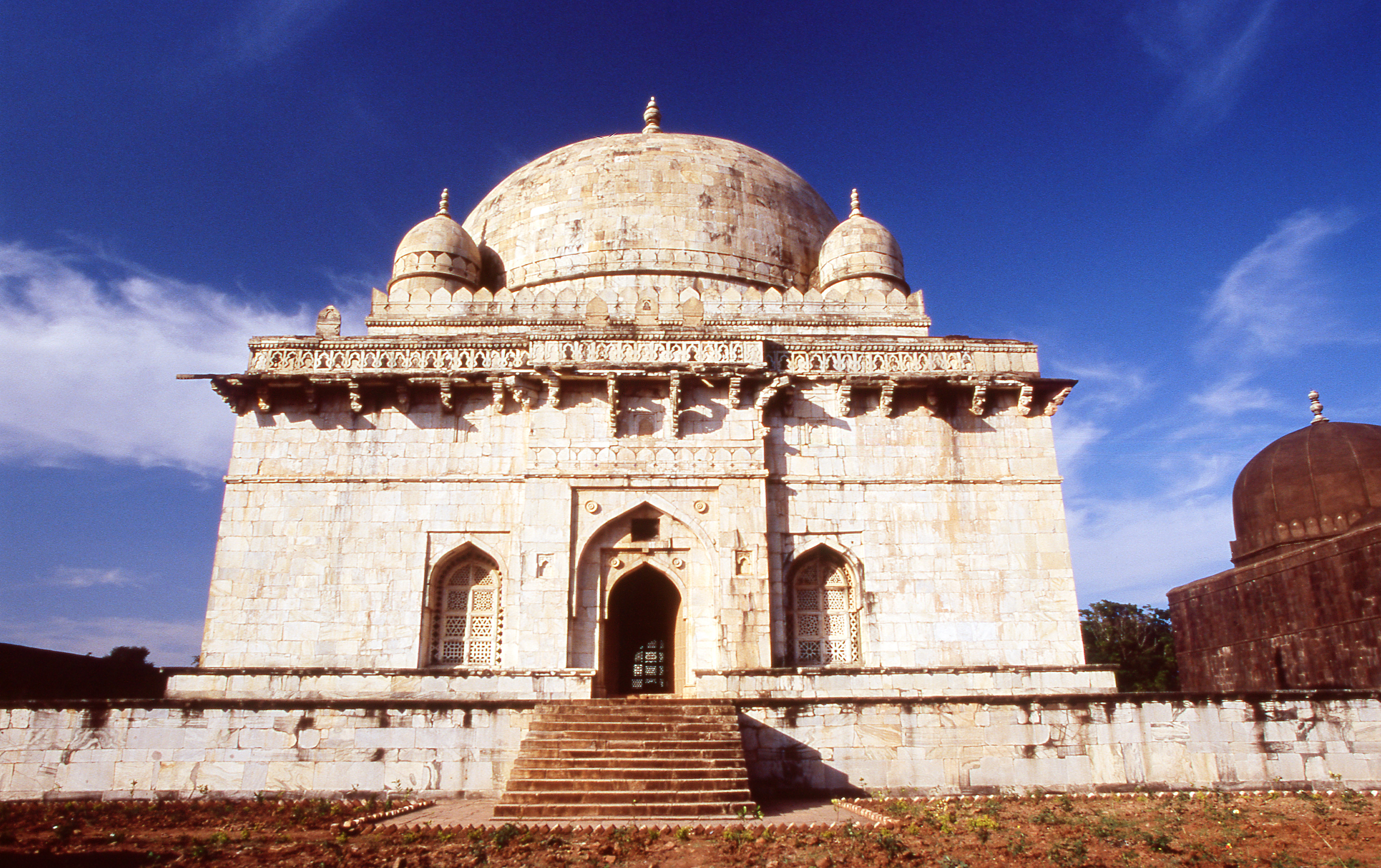
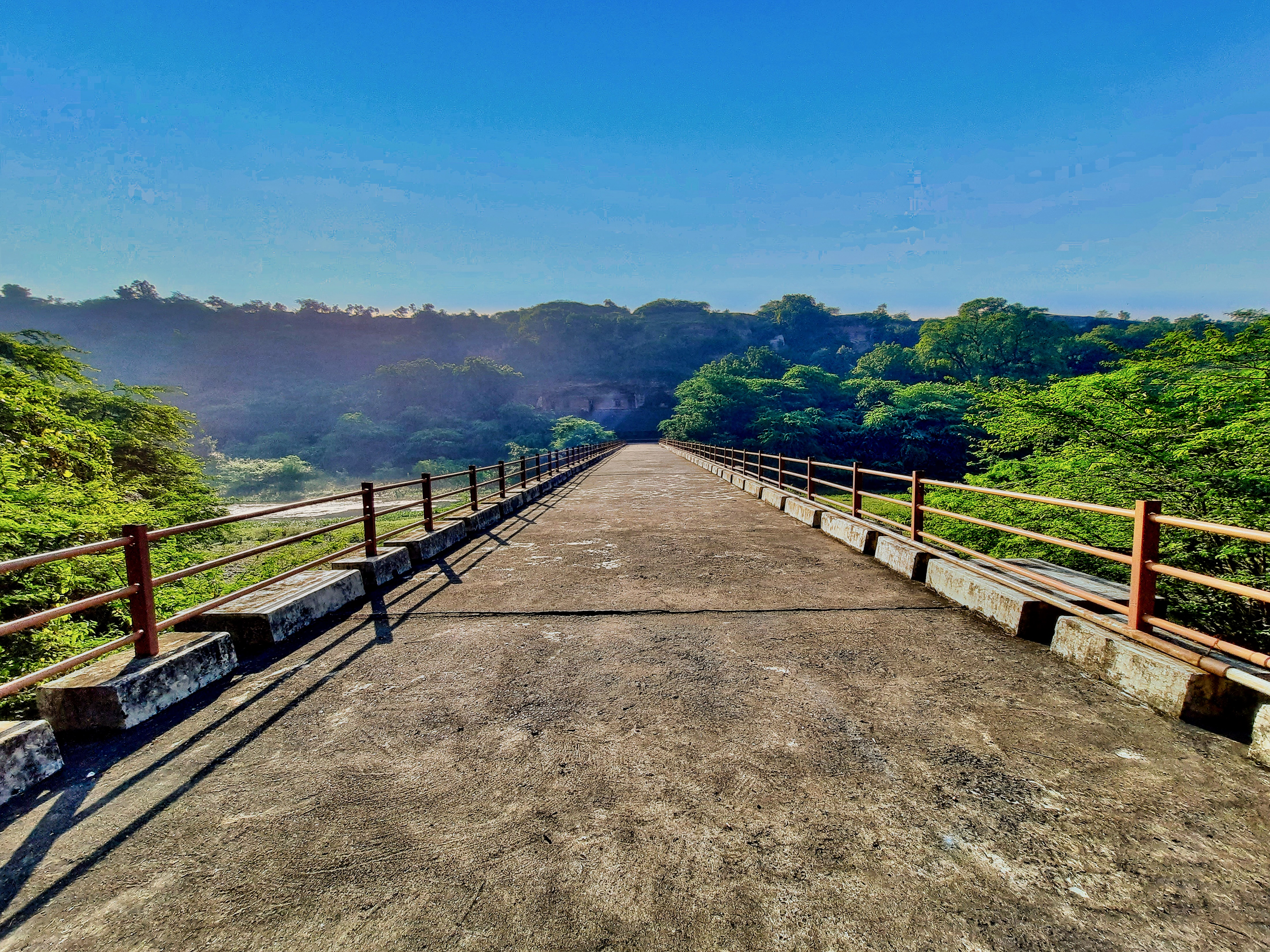
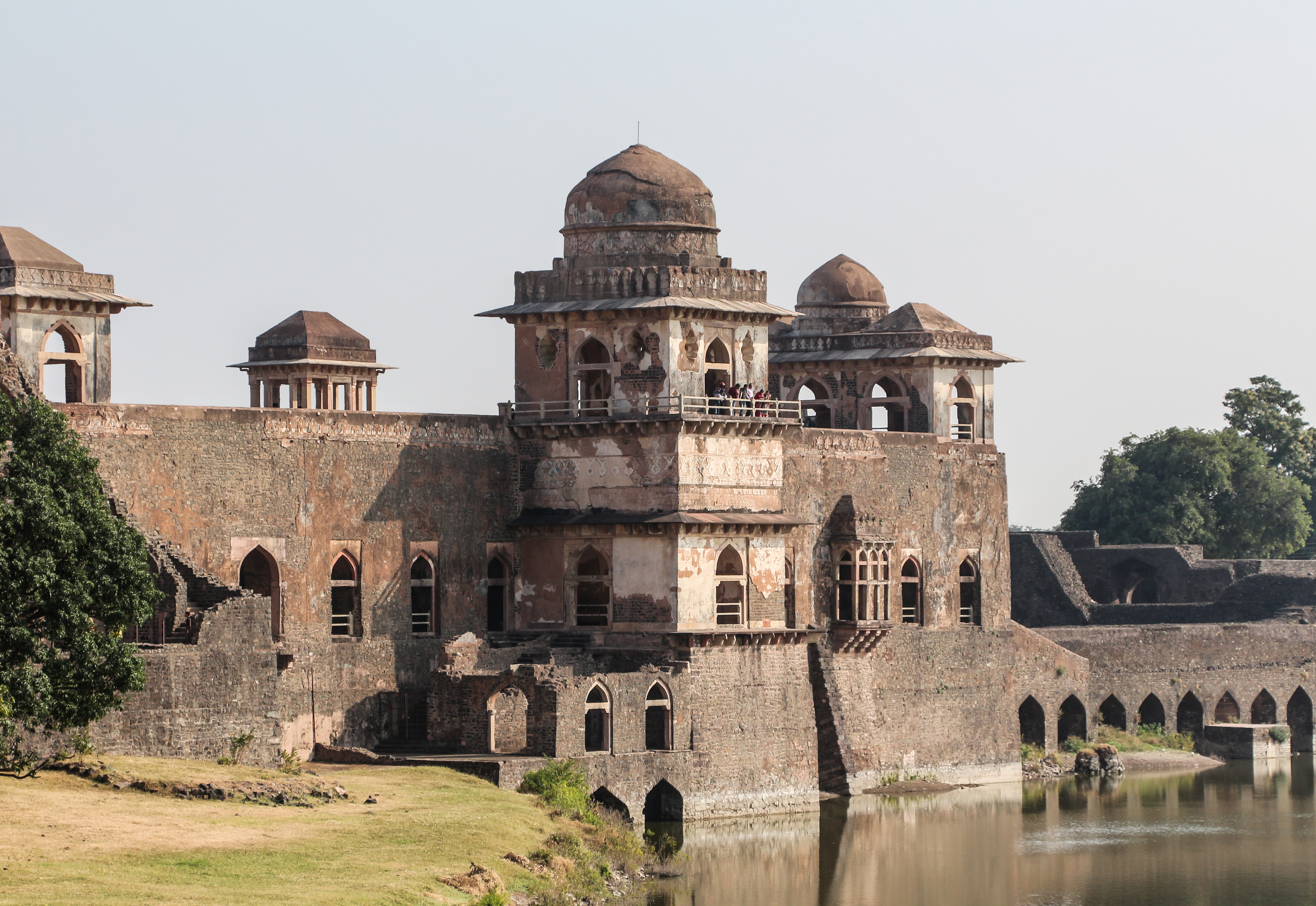
- Dhar Fort Bagh Caves Hoshangshah tomb Road to Bagh Caves Jahaz Mahal Mandu

- Location within Madhya Pradesh Location within India
- Coordinates: 22°35′50″N 75°18′15″E
- Country: India
- State: Madhya Pradesh
- District: Dhar

Government
  - Type: Municipal Council
  - Body: Dhar Municipal Council
- Elevation: 559 m (1,834 ft)

Population (2011)
  - Total: 93,917
- Demonym: Dharwasi

Language
  - Official: Hindi
- Time zone: UTC+5:30 (IST)
- Postal code: 454001
- Vehicle registration: MP-11
- Website: dhar.nic.in

Dhar (IAST Dhār, Hindi धार) is a city located in Dhar district of the Malwa region in the state of Madhya Pradesh, India. The city is the administrative headquarters of the Dhar district. Before Indian independence from Great Britain, it was the capital of the Dhar princely state.

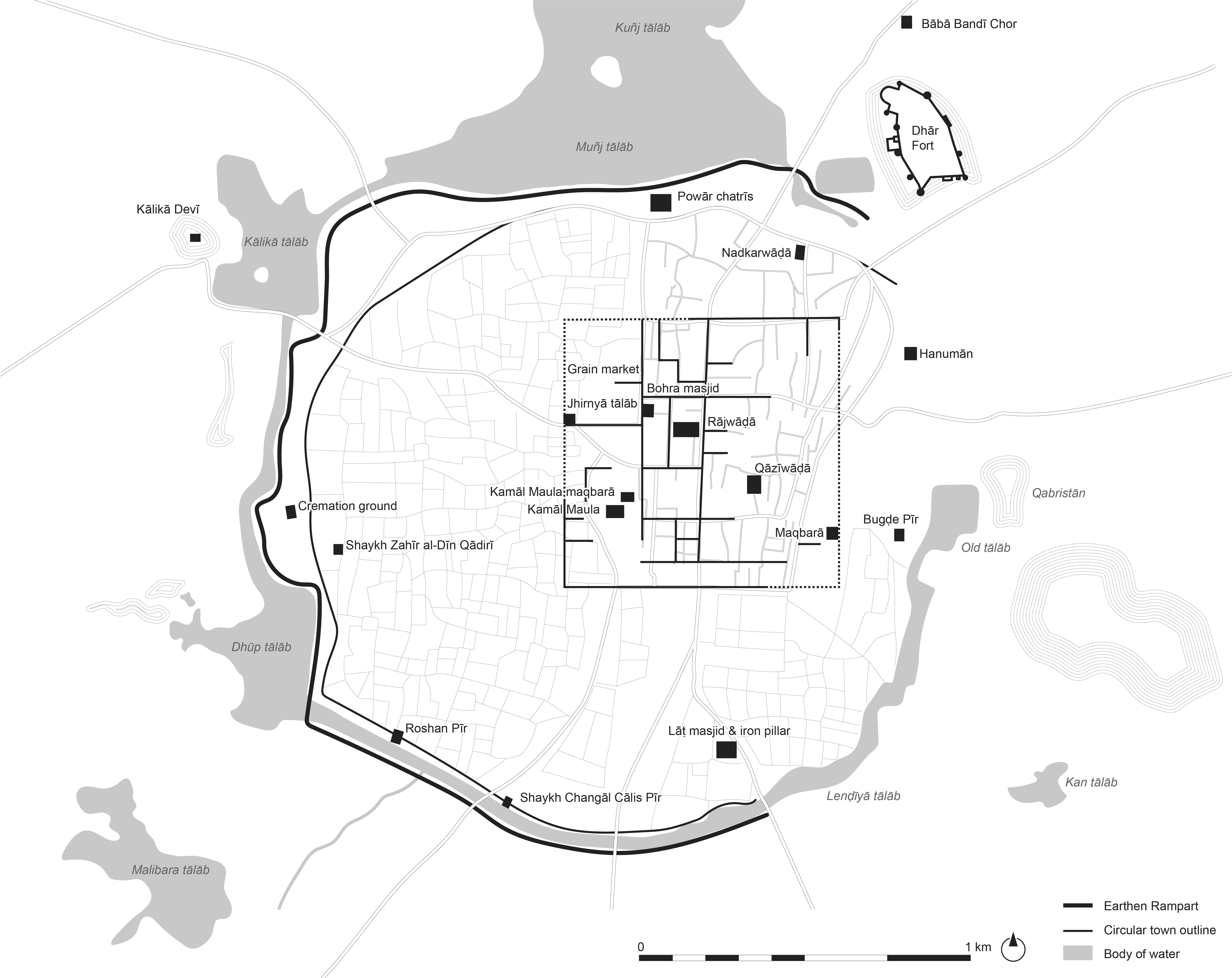
Dhār (Madhya Pradesh). Historic plan showing ramparts, moat, key monuments and grid layout of the old town

== Location ==
Dhar is situated between 21°57' to 23°15' N and 74°37' to 75°37' E. The city is bordered in the north by Ratlam, to the east by parts of Indore, in the south by Barwani, and to the west by Jhabua and Alirajpur. The town is located 34 miles (55 km) west of Mhow. It is located 559 m (1,834 ft) above sea level. It possesses, alongside its old ramparts, many buildings which contain records of cultural, historical and national importance.

== Historic places and monuments ==
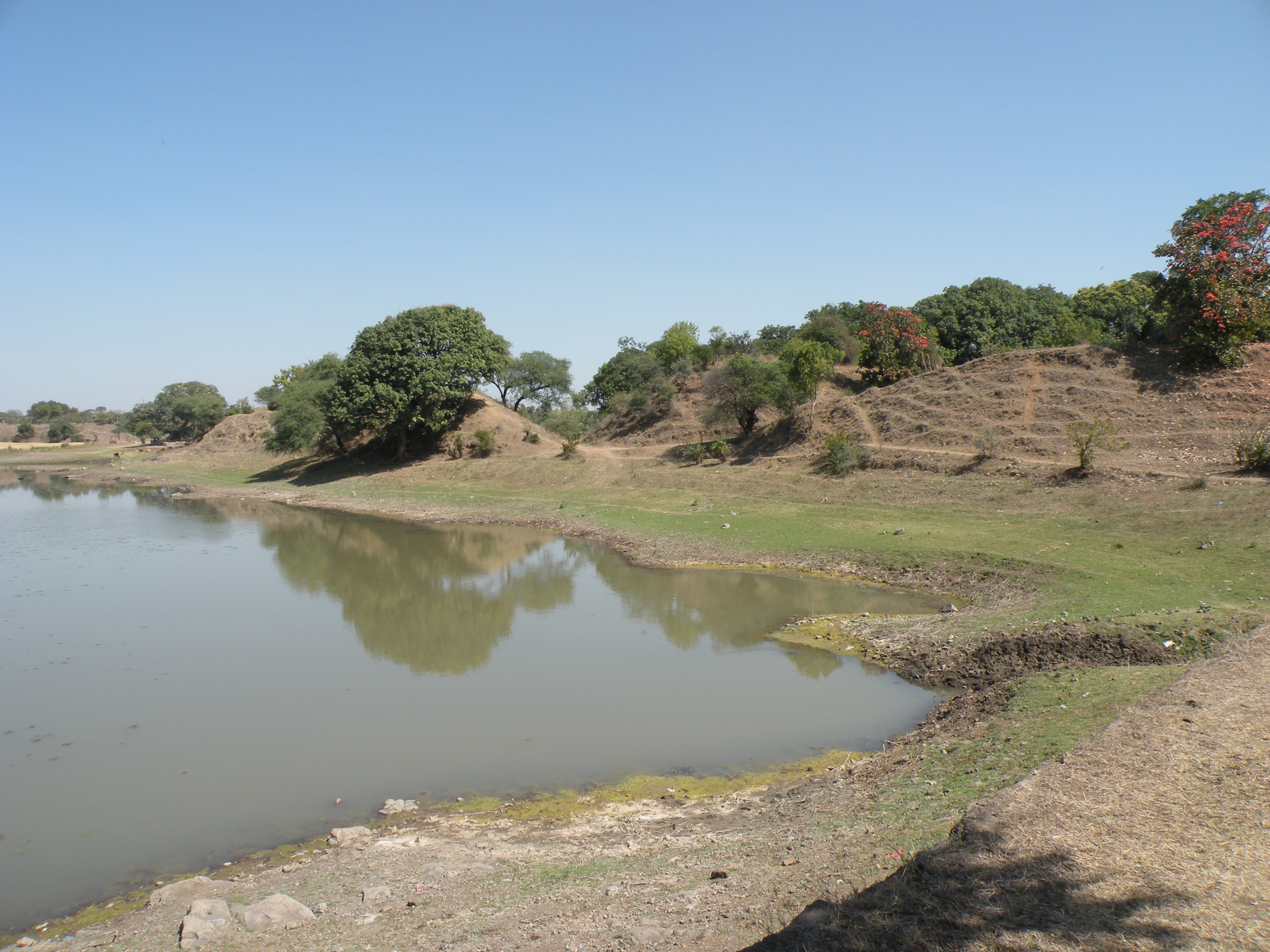
One of few remaining portions of the Paramāra-period ramparts at Dhār at Dhūp Tālāb

The most visible parts of ancient Dhar are the massive earthen ramparts, which are best preserved on the western and southern sides of the town. These were most likely built at beginning of the 9th century. Wall remains show that the city was circular in plan and surrounded by a series of tanks and moats, similar to Warangal in the Deccan. The circular ramparts of Dhar, unique in north India and an important legacy of the Paramāras, are unprotected and have been slowly dismantled by brick-makers and others using the wall material for construction. On the north-east side of the town, the ramparts and moats have disappeared beneath modern homes and other buildings. There are many stepwells of various periods in Dhar which are dried or filled with sewage and trash. Till now, 46 stepwells are listed in the Dhar premises, and a work of reviving those stepwells is an ongoing plan for the year 2024.

=== Fort ===
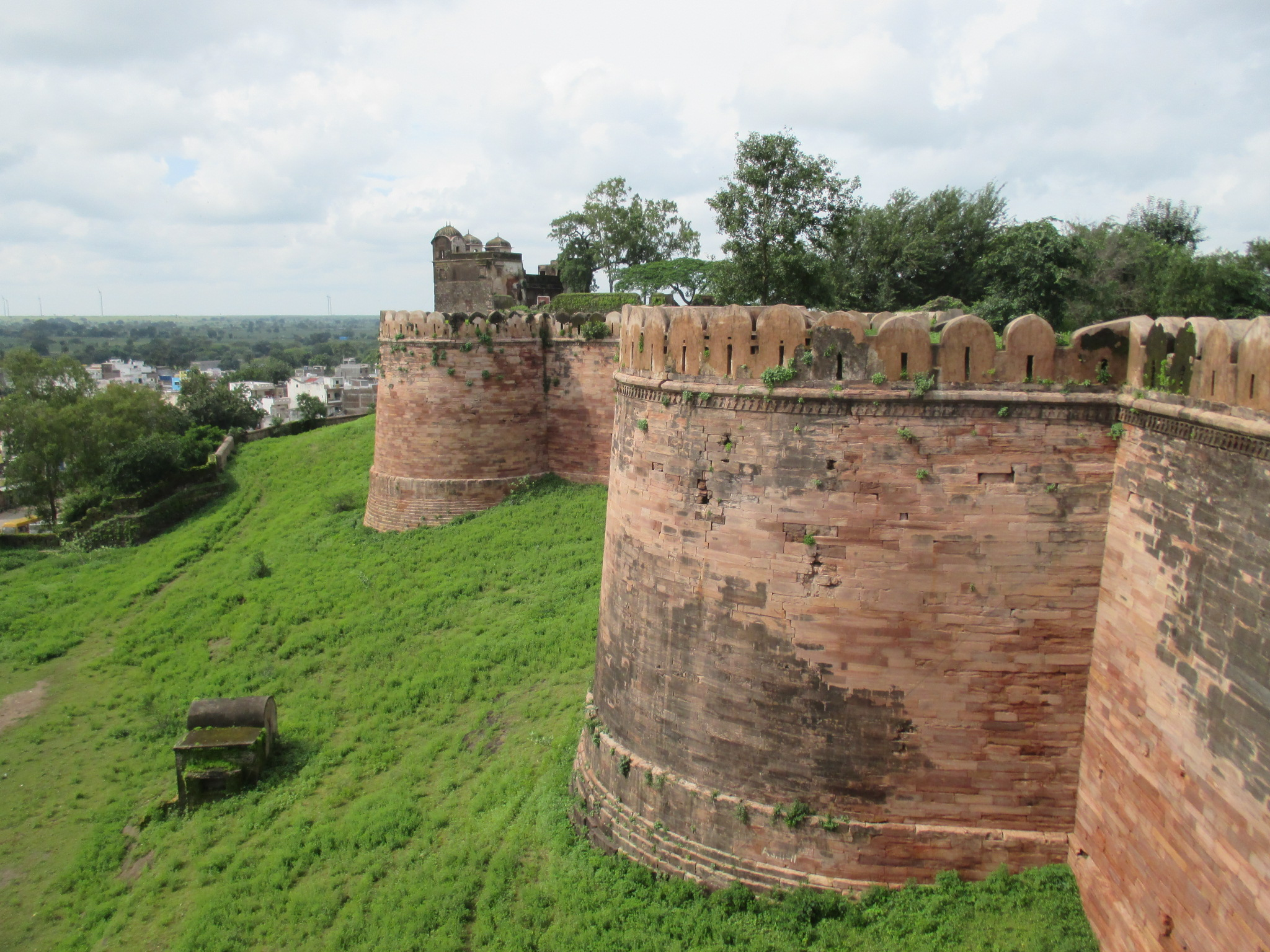
Outer wall and bastions of the fort at Dhār, western side

The historic parts of Dhar are dominated by an impressive sandstone fortress on a small hill. The fortress is thought to have been built by Muhammad bin Tughluq, the Sultan of Delhi, most likely on the site of the ancient Dhārāgiri mentioned in early sources. One of the gateways, added later, dates to 1684–85 in the time of 'Ālamgīr. Inside the fort there is a deep rock-cut cistern of great age, and a later palace of the Mahārāja of Dhar that incorporates an elegant pillared porch from the Mughal period, possibly built in the mid-17th century. The palace area houses an outdoor museum with a small collection of temple fragments and images dating to medieval times.

=== Museum ===
Inside the fort, a large number of sculptures and antiquities from Dhar and its neighbourhood are kept in utilitarian buildings constructed in the late 19th century. Some pieces from the collection have been moved to Mandu where the Department of Archaeology, Museums and Archives has created a museum with a range of displays in the 'Barnes Koti', a Sultanate-period building used by Captain Ernest Barnes, the political agent of the Bhopawar agency.

=== Tomb of Shaykh Changāl ===
On the overgrown ramparts of the medieval city, overlooking the old moat, is the tomb of Shaykh Abdullah Shāh Changāl, a warrior saint. The earliest evidence for the tomb comes from an inscription of 1455; the building was entirely rebuilt in the second half of the 20th century.

=== Iron Pillar ===
One of the most significant historical attractions at Dhār is the ancient iron pillar. Fragments of it are at the Lat Mosque where the three surviving portions are displayed outside the mosque on a platform thanks to the conservation efforts of the Archaeological Survey of India. The pillar, which was nearly 13.2 m high according to the most recent assessment, carries several inscriptions, the most important recording a visit by the Mughal emperor Akbar in 1598 while on a military campaign in the Deccan. The pillar's original stone footing is displayed nearby.

=== Lat Mosque ===
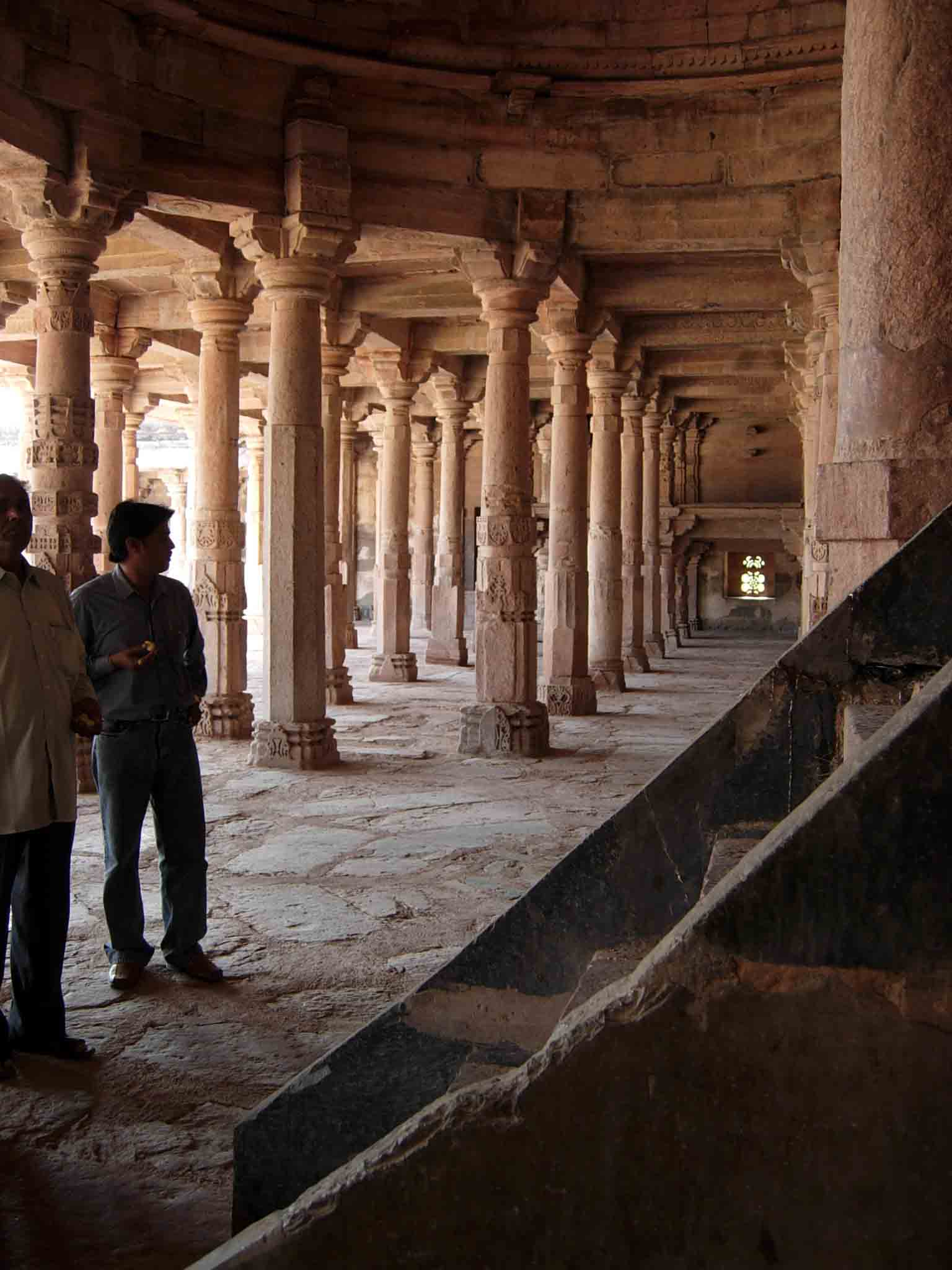
Lāṭ Masjid, interior, built in 1405

The Lat Masjid, or 'Pillar Mosque', located to the south of the town, was built as the Jami' Mosque by Dilawar Khan in 1405. It derives its name from the iron pillar ("lāṭ" in Hindi), which lies in the immediate campus of the mosque.

=== Kamāl Maulā Campus ===
The Kamāl Maulā is a spacious enclosure containing a number of tombs, the most notable being that of Shaykh Kamāl Mālvī or Kamāl al-Dīn (circa 1238–1331). Kamāl al-Dīn was a follower of Farīd al-Dīn Gaṅj-i Shakar (circa 1173–1266) and the Chishti saint Nizamuddin Auliya (1238–1325) and migrated to Malwa with his brother in the late 1200s. His descendants have served as custodians of Kamāl al-Dīn's tomb in an unbroken line for 700 years.

=== Bhoj Shala ===
Except for the Mihrab and Minbar, which were purpose-built for the monument, the hypostyle hall immediately next the tomb of Kamāl Maula is made of recycled temple columns and other architectural parts. It is similar to the Lāṭ Masjid, but was built earlier, as an inscription from 1392 described records of repairs by Dilāwar Khān. In 1903, Sanskrit and Prakrit inscriptions from the time of Arjunavarman (circa 1210–15) were found in the walls of the building by K. K. Lele, Superintendent of Education in the Princely State of Dhar. The engraved inscriptions are displayed inside the entrance. One text includes parts of a drama called Vijayaśrīnāṭikā composed by Madana, the king's preceptor, who bore the epithet Bālasarasvatī. Other tablets noted by Lele include a slab inscribed in Prakrit with two versions of the Kūrmaśataka – verses in praise of the Ādī Kūrma, the primordial or foundational tortoise in Hindu tradition. The inscription contains a colophon ascribing it to king Bhoja. These finds prompted Lele to name the building Bhoj Shala, or 'Hall of Bhoja', in reference to King Bhoja (circa 1000–55), the author of several works on poetics, grammar and aesthetics, most notably the Śṛṅgāra Prakāśa. C. E. Luard, writing in 1908, does not use the term Bhoj Shala but mentions traditions describing the building as 'Raja Bhoja's school'.

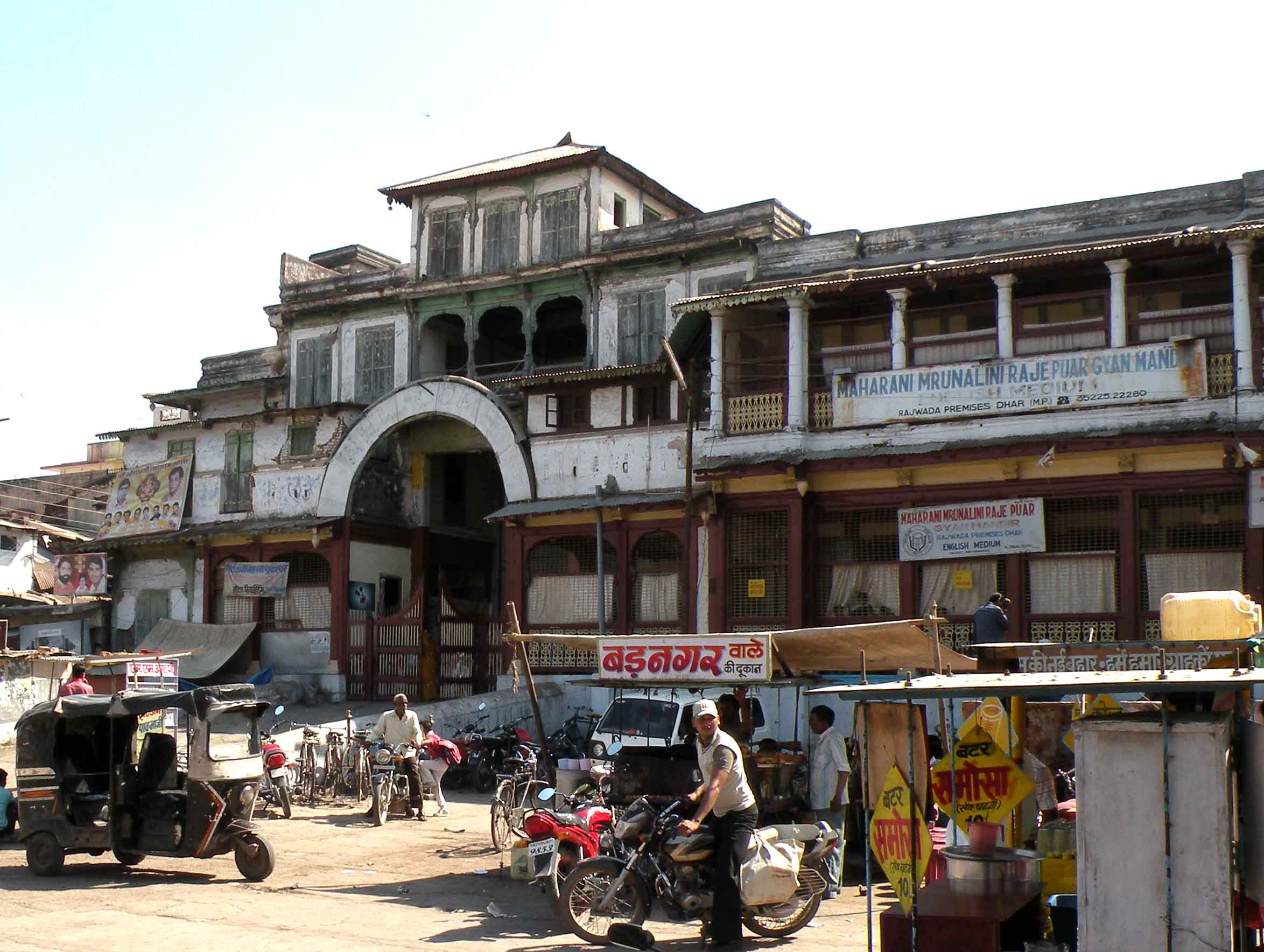
City Palace, built in 1875

=== Cenotaphs and Old City Palace ===
The old city palace of the Pawar clan, a branch of the Marathas that claims descent from the Parmar Rajputs of Malwa, is now used as a school. It is a plain, medium-sized building built around 1875. A marble statue of the Jain goddess Ambikā, discovered on the site of the palace in 1875, is now in the British Museum. Of the same time period as the palace are a collection of domed cenotaphs of the Pawar rulers on the edge of the large tank known as Muñj Talab. The name of the tank was probably derived from Vākpati Muñja (10th century), the first Paramāra king that entered Mālwa and made Ujjain his main administrative seat.

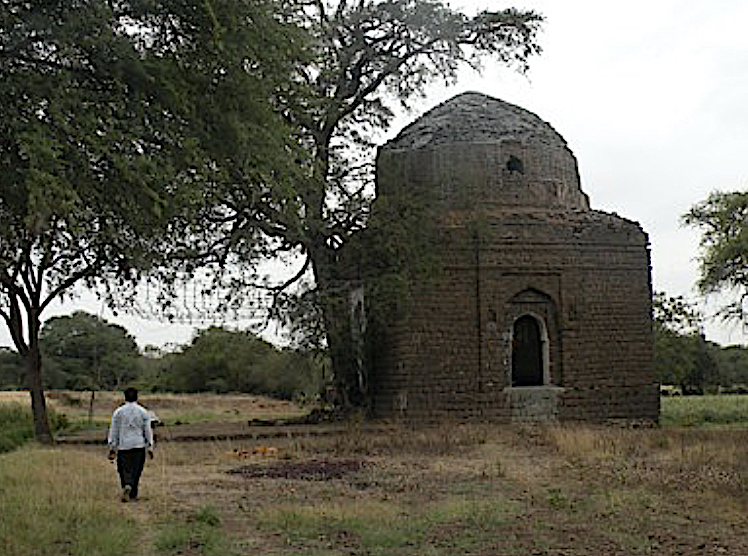
Tomb of Shaykh Zahīr al-Dīn Qādirī

=== Tomb of Shaykh Zahīr al-Dīn Qādirī ===
The tomb said to be that of Shaykh Zahīr al-Dīn Qādirī, a contemporary of Kamāl-al-Dīn, stands in the fields on the western side of the old circular city.

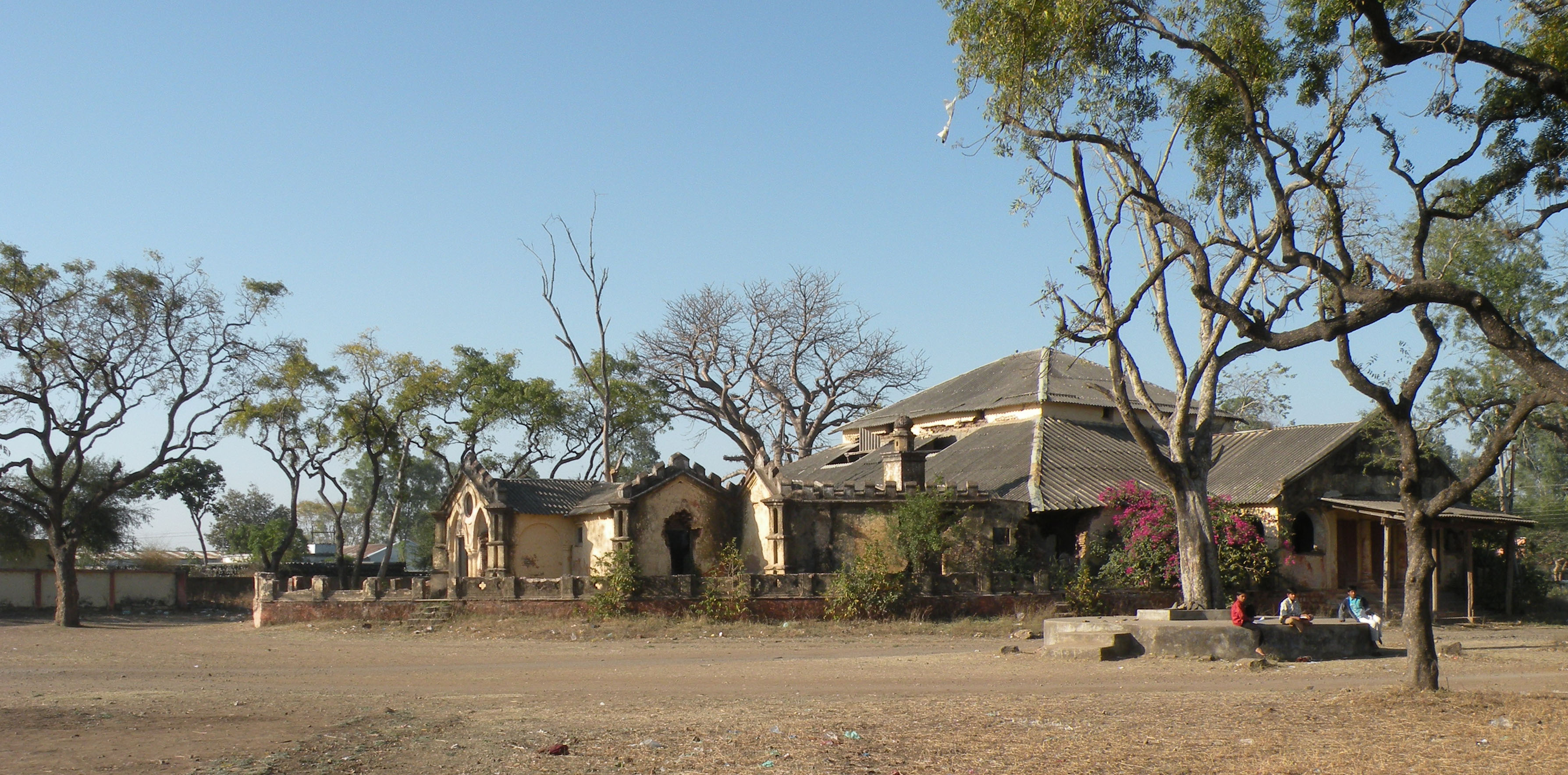
Agency House in 2010

=== Tomb of Bugḍe Pīr ===
On the east side of the old town the tomb of Tāj al-Dīn 'Aṭā'ullah. Popularly known as Bugḍe Pīr, the building is a small domical structure of the seventeenth century. 'Aṭā'ullah was born in 1578-79 and enjoyed the patronage of Nur Jahan.

=== Agency House ===
Another colonial era building at Dhar, located outside the old town on the road to Indore, is the Agency House. It was built by the Public Works Department during British rule and was the center of the administration of Dhar State and the Central India Agency. The building has been abandoned and is now in ruins.

=== Jheera Bagh ===
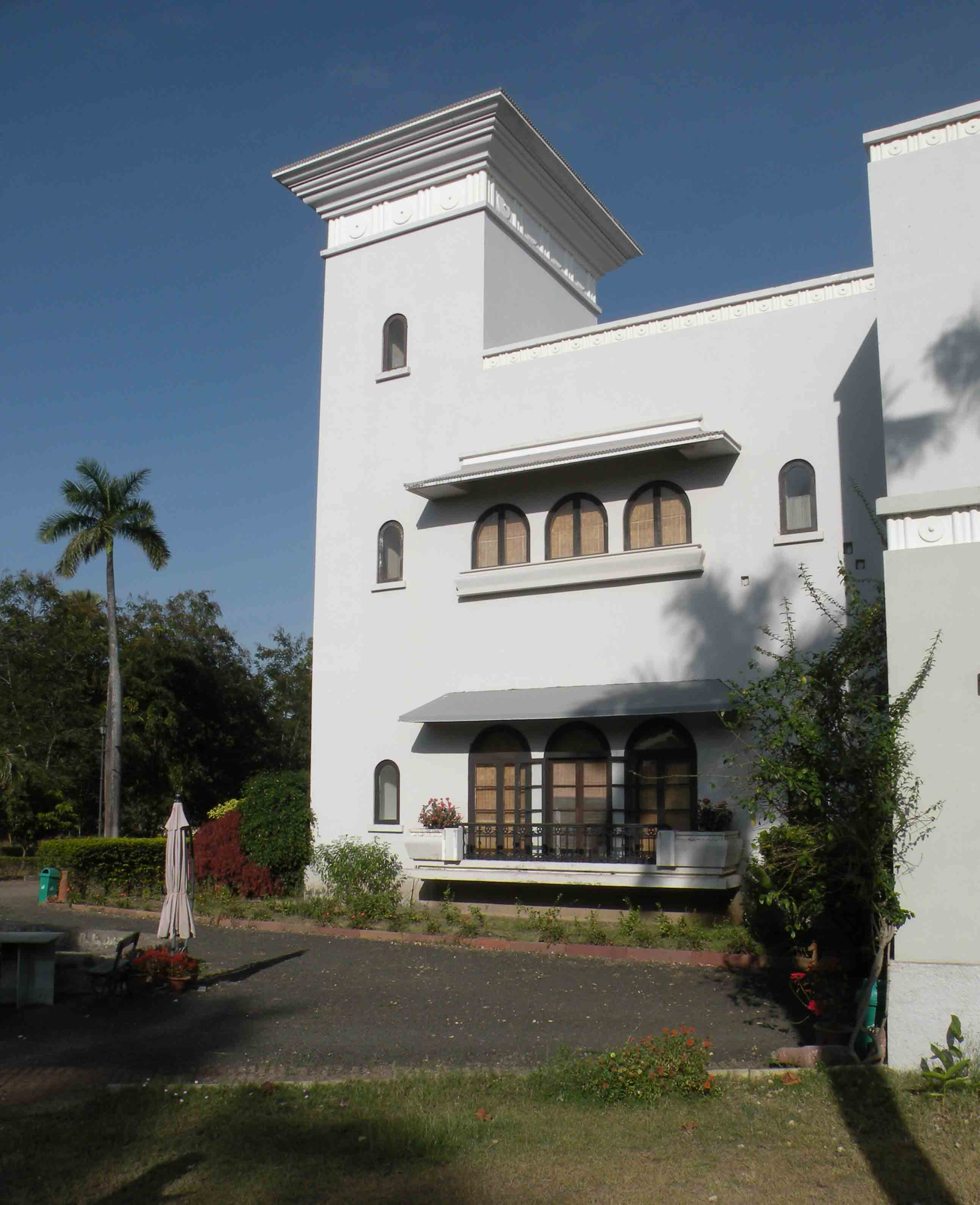
Jheera Bagh Palace, renovated 1940s

In the 1860s, the Powars built a palace at Hazīra Bāgh, adjacent to the road to Māṇḍū. Known as the Jheera Bāgh Palace, the complex was renovated by Mahārāja Anand Rao Pawar IV in the 1940s and is now run as a heritage hotel. Designed in an unpretentious art deco style, it is considered to be one of the most elegant and forward-looking examples of early modern architecture in North India.

== Political history ==
The town of Dhar, derived from Dhārā Nagara ('city of sword blades'), is of considerable antiquity, the first reference to it appearing in an inscription in Jaunpur during the Maukhari dynasty (6th century). Dhar rose to prominence when it was made the primary seat of the Paramara chiefs of Malwa by Vairisiṃha (circa 920-45 CE). Vairisimha appears to have transferred his headquarters to Dhar from Ujjain. During the rule of the Paramāras, Dhar was a respected centre of culture and learning, especially under the rule of King Bhoja (circa 1000–1055). The wealth and splendor of Dhar drew the attention of competing dynasties in the 11th century. The Cāḷukyas of Kalyāṇa under Someśvara I (circa CE 1042–68) captured and burnt the city, also occupying Māṇḍū (ancient Māṇḍava). Dhar was subsequently sacked by the Cāḷukyas of Gujarāt under Siddharāja. The devastation and political fragmentation caused by these wars meant that there was no significant opposition when Ala ud din Khilji, the Sultān of Delhi, dispatched an army to Mālwa in the early 14th century. The region was annexed to Delhi, and Dhar was made the capital of the province under 'Ayn al-Mulk Mūltānī, who served as governor until 1313. The events that occurred during the following seventy years are unclear, but some time in A.H. 793/C.E. 1390-91 Dilawar Khan was appointed muqṭi of Dhar (and also the governor of Mālwa) by Sulṭān Muḥammad Shāh. Dilāwar Khān took the title 'Amīd Shāh Dā'ūd' and mandated the khutba to be read in his name in A.H. 804/C.E. 1401–1402, thereby establishing himself as an independent sulṭān. Upon his death in 1406, his son Hoshang Shah became king, with his capital situated in Māṇḍū. In the time of Akbar, Dhar fell under the dominion of the Mughals, and remained under Mughal control until 1730, when the town was conquered by the Marathas.

In late 1723, Bajirao, at the head of a large army and accompanied by his lieutenants Malharrao Holkar, Ranoji Shinde (Scindia) and Udaji Rao Pawar, swept through Malwa. A few years earlier, the Mughal Emperor had been forced to relinquish to the Marathas the right to collect Chauth taxes in Malwa and Gujarat. This levy was financially beneficial to the Maratha caste, as both the king Shahu and his Peshwa, Bajirao, were in large amounts of debt at the time. Agriculture in the Deccan depended heavily on the timeliness and duration of the monsoons. The most important source of royal revenue was, therefore, the Chauth (a 25% tax on produce) and Sardeshmukhi (a ten per cent surcharge) exacted by the Marathas. The revenues the Marathas collected from their own lands were not sufficient to run the administration of their state and finance their large military expenditure, as their government was focused on conquest and not economic development.

The Marathan armies eventually defeated the Mughal governor and attacked the capital Ujjain. Bajirao established military outposts in the country as far north as Bundelkhand.

Towards the end of the 18th century and in the early part of the 19th century, the Marathan state was subject to a series of spoliations by Scindia of Gwalior and Holkar of Indore, (descendants of Ranoji Scindia and Malharao Holkar), but was saved from annihilation by the strong rule of the adoptive mother of the fifth raja.

=== Dhar State ===
After the Third Anglo-Maratha War of 1818, Dhar fell under British rule. The Dhar State was designated as a princely state of India, in the Bhopawar Agency of the Central India Agency. It included several Rajput and Bhil feudatories and had an area of 1,775 square miles (4,600 km^{2}). The state was confiscated by the British after the Revolt of 1857. In 1860, it was restored to Raja Anand Rao III Pawar, then a minor, with the exception of the detached district of Bairusia which was granted to the Begum of Bhopal. Anand Rao, who received the personal title Maharaja and the KCSI in 1877, died in 1898; he was succeeded by Udaji Rao II Pawar.

=== Dhar Thikanas ===
A separate department whose purpose was to superintend Thakurs and Bhumias, called "Department of Thakurans, Bhumians and Thikanejat", was established in 1921. At the time there were 22 such estates in the state of Dhar.

The jagir lands of the nobles of Dhar (feudatory estates), all of whom paid tribute to the Darbar, were divided between Thakurs and Bhumias.

The Thakurs, with a few exceptions, were Rajput landholders whose estates were located in the north of the state. Locally, the Thakurs were called Talukdars and their holdings called kothari. By caste, there were 8 Rathore Rajputs, one Pawar and one Kayasth.

The Bhumias, or "Allodial" Chiefs, were all Bhilalas, a clan claiming to be of mixed Bhil and Rajput (Chauhan) descent. Their grants were originally obtained from the Darbar on the understanding that they would keep the peace among the Bhils and other hill tribes. They paid yearly tribute to the Darbar, in turn receiving cash allowances (Bhet-Ghugri), an ancient feudal custom.

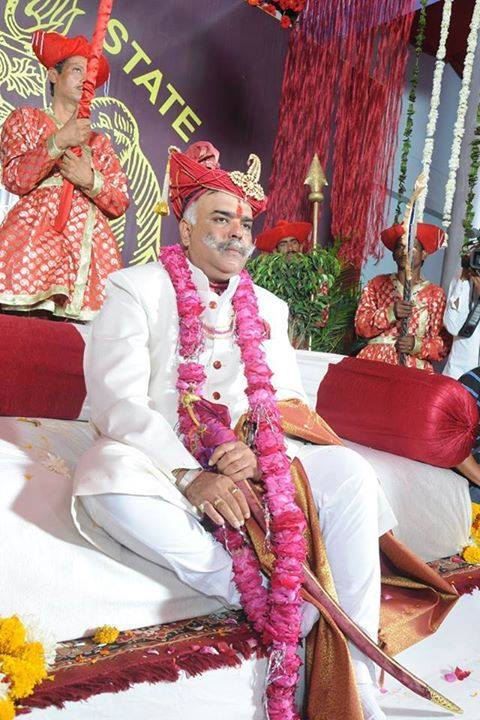
HH Maharaja Shrimant Hemendra Singh Rao Pawar of the Dhar State seated on the 'Gadi' of the Kshatriya Maratha Pawar (Puar) Clan. The coronation of the 12th Maharaja of the Dhar State was solemnised on 15 January 2015 at the 'Rajwada' (Old Palace) of Dhar.

=== Political representation and Royal Legacy ===
Bhartiya Janata Party politician Neena Vikram Verma serves as a member of the Madhya Pradesh Legislative Assembly for the Dhar-Vidhan-Sabha Constituency.

In 2024, Savitri Thakur of the Bharatiya Janata Party was elected as a Member of Parliament representing the Dhar constituency.

Maharaja Shrimant Hemendra Singh Rao Pawar is the present titular head of the Maratha Pawar dynasty of the State of Dhar.

== Demographics ==
As of the 2011 Indian Census, Dhar had a total population of 93,917, of which 48,413 were males and 45,504 were females. 11,947 were between 0 and 6 years old. The total number of literate people in Dhar was 68,928. 73.4% of the population was literate, with a male literacy rate of 78.1% and a female literacy rate of 68.4%. The literacy rate of the 7+ population in Dhar was 84.1%, of which the male literacy rate was 89.9% and the female literacy rate was 78.0%. The Scheduled Castes and Scheduled Tribes population was 7,549 and 16,636 respectively. As of 2011, Dhar has 18531 households.

This is an increase from the 2001 India census, when Dhar had a population of 75,472, of which males constituted 52% and females 48%. In 2001, Dhar had an average literacy rate of 70%, higher than the national average of 59.5%. Male literacy was 76% and female literacy was 63%. In 2001, 14% of the population of Dhar was under 6 years of age.

=== Religion ===
Religion in Dhar (2011)
| Religion | Percent |
| Hindus | 79.62% |
| Muslims | 17.39% |
| Jains | 2.05% |
| Others | 0.94% |
Distribution of religions

The majority of the population adheres to Hinduism, with significant groups following Islam and Jainism.

== Postal information ==
In 1897, primitive stamps with entirely native text were issued. The second definitive issue bore the name "Dhar State" in Latin script; with a total of 8 stamps. Since 1901, Indian stamps have been in use in Dhar.

== Discovery of Dinosaur Fossils ==
Dhar, being part of the Lameta Formation, is well known for the discovery of fossils of dinosaurs, dinosaur nests, shark teeth, tree fossils, and marine mollusks. These fossils are very well preserved due to the Deccan volcanism causing a flow of volcanic lava over them. Fossils of Titanosaurus, Isisaurus, Indosaurus, Indosuchus, Laevisuchus and Rajasaurus have been discovered here.

Unique eggs have been discovered in Dhar region which indicates that the species reproduced like birds and the first egg within egg (ovum-in-ovo) or multi-shelled egg has been discovered here.

== Notable people ==
Baji Rao II, the last of the Peshwas, was born in Dhar.

== Transportation ==
- By air: The nearest airport is Devi Ahilyabai Holkar Airport (IDR) in Indore, located approximately 60 km from Dhar . This airport has regular flights connecting to major Indian cities such as Delhi, Mumbai, Pune, Jaipur, Hyderabad, Ahmedabad, Nagpur, Raipur and Kolkata.
- By train: Dhar is an upcoming junction railway station. Construction work is in full swing. The closest railway station is in Indore, which is about 60 km away [1]. Another option is Ratlam, situated 93 km from Dhar by road. From Indore or Ratlam, one can travel to Dhar by bus or taxi.
- By road: Dhar is well-connected to other cities by road. It is accessible by road for tourists coming from Maharashtra and Gujarat.

== Climate ==
Climate data for Dhar (1991–2020, extremes 1973–2020)
| Month | Jan | Feb | Mar | Apr | May | Jun | Jul | Aug | Sep | Oct | Nov | Dec | Year |
|---|---|---|---|---|---|---|---|---|---|---|---|---|---|
| Record high °C (°F) | 33.8 (92.8) | 37.7 (99.9) | 43.1 (109.6) | 44.4 (111.9) | 47.1 (116.8) | 44.6 (112.3) | 39.6 (103.3) | 36.2 (97.2) | 38.3 (100.9) | 38.7 (101.7) | 35.7 (96.3) | 35.7 (96.3) | 47.1 (116.8) |
| Mean daily maximum °C (°F) | 26.0 (78.8) | 29.3 (84.7) | 34.3 (93.7) | 38.4 (101.1) | 39.7 (103.5) | 35.5 (95.9) | 29.6 (85.3) | 28.6 (83.5) | 30.2 (86.4) | 32.5 (90.5) | 30.2 (86.4) | 28.1 (82.6) | 31.8 (89.2) |
| Mean daily minimum °C (°F) | 10.3 (50.5) | 12.8 (55.0) | 18.2 (64.8) | 22.2 (72.0) | 24.6 (76.3) | 23.7 (74.7) | 21.9 (71.4) | 21.2 (70.2) | 20.8 (69.4) | 18.6 (65.5) | 14.8 (58.6) | 11.7 (53.1) | 18.3 (64.9) |
| Record low °C (°F) | 3.3 (37.9) | 3.0 (37.4) | 6.1 (43.0) | 12.1 (53.8) | 18.1 (64.6) | 16.6 (61.9) | 16.0 (60.8) | 15.0 (59.0) | 15.6 (60.1) | 9.6 (49.3) | 6.1 (43.0) | 4.1 (39.4) | 3.0 (37.4) |
| Average rainfall mm (inches) | 2.2 (0.09) | 1.9 (0.07) | 2.1 (0.08) | 2.5 (0.10) | 11.4 (0.45) | 128.0 (5.04) | 313.2 (12.33) | 207.0 (8.15) | 163.5 (6.44) | 39.1 (1.54) | 15.6 (0.61) | 2.1 (0.08) | 888.7 (34.99) |
| Average rainy days | 0.1 | 0.2 | 0.2 | 0.1 | 0.6 | 7.1 | 13.6 | 11.5 | 7.4 | 1.9 | 0.8 | 0.1 | 43.6 |
| Average relative humidity (%) (at 17:30 IST) | 50 | 41 | 35 | 40 | 38 | 57 | 79 | 82 | 76 | 52 | 53 | 54 | 55 |
Source: India Meteorological Department

== Gallery ==
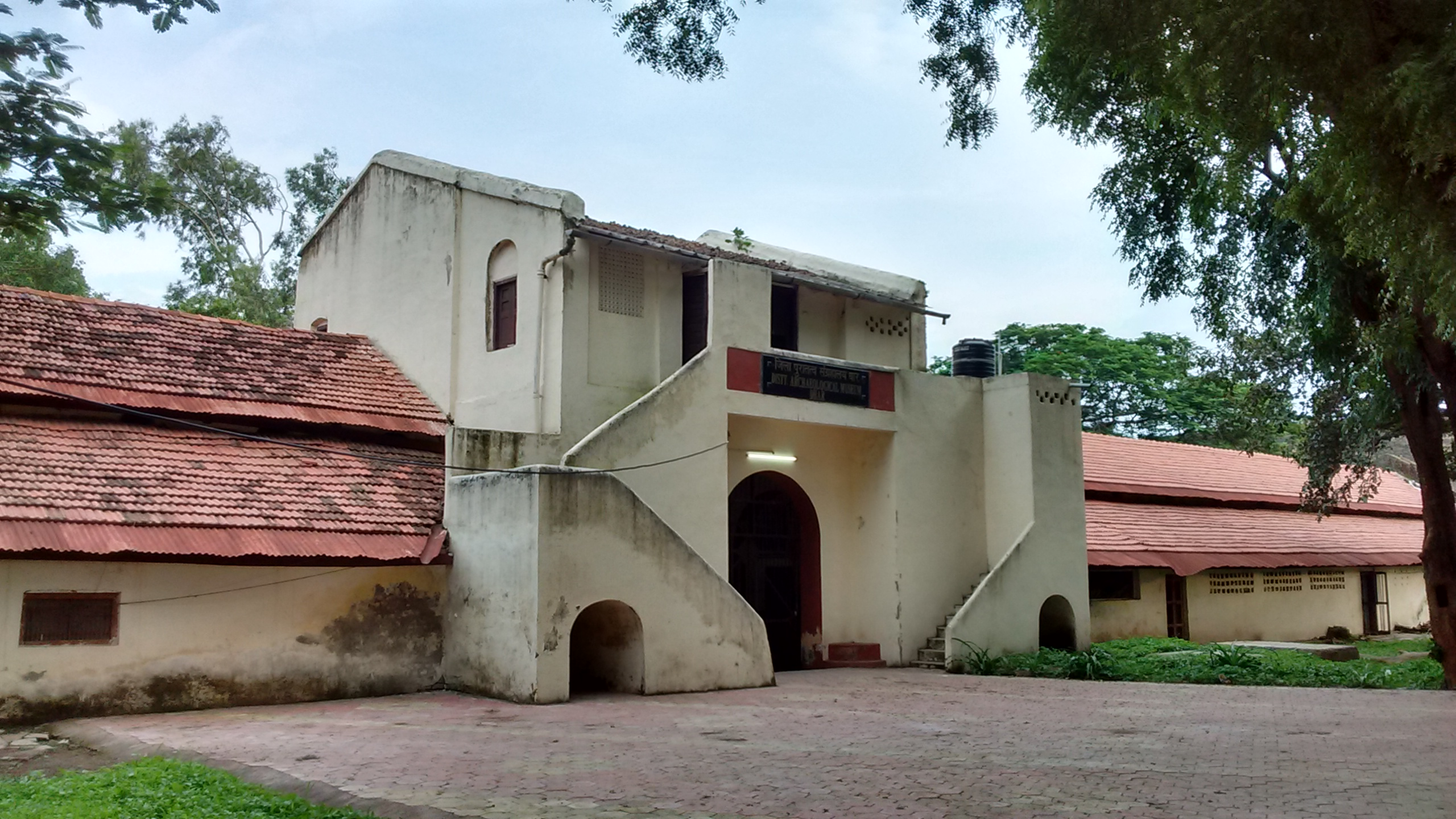
District Archaeological Museum, Dhār, Madhya Pradesh

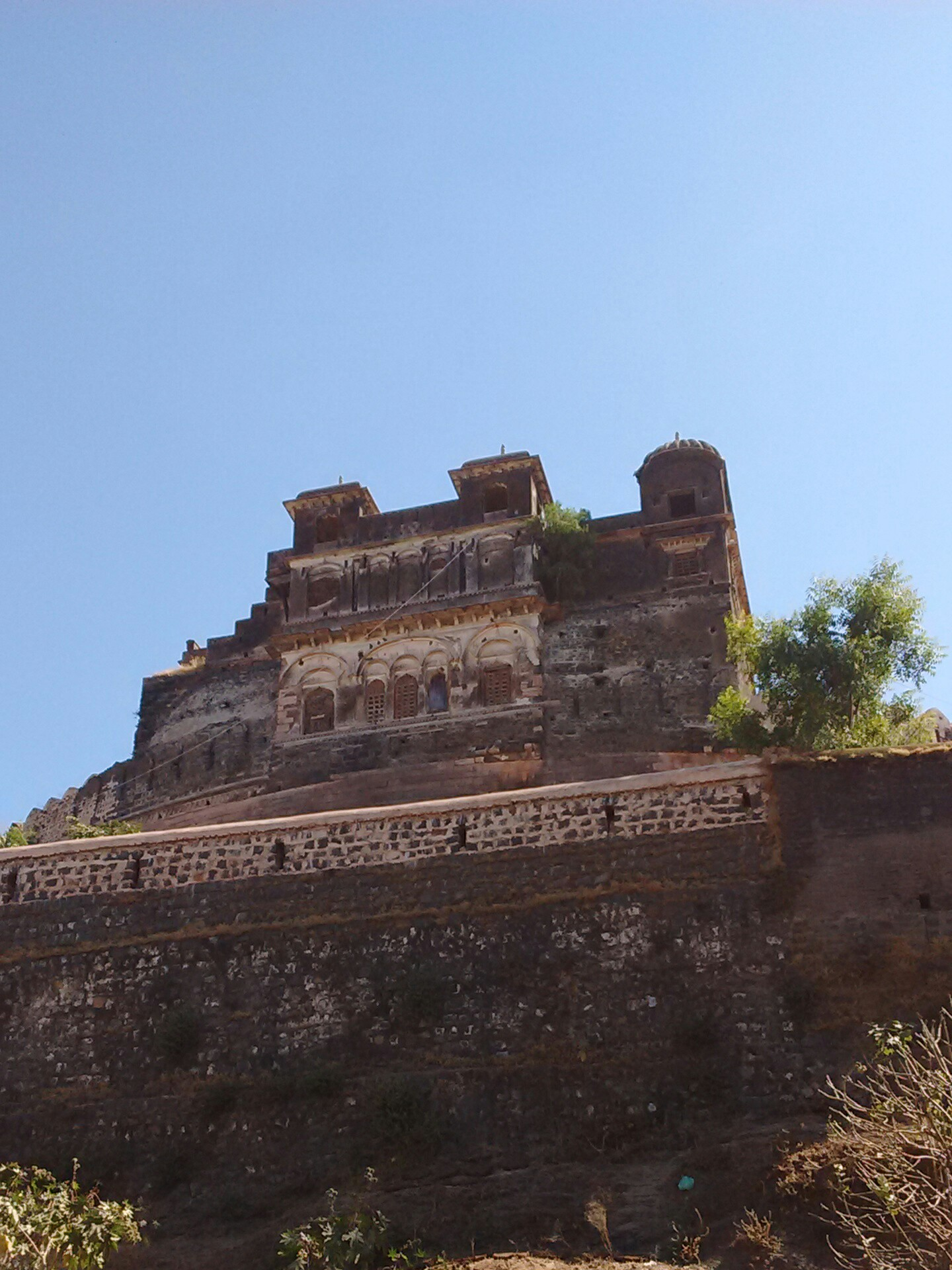
Kharbuza Mahal at the Dhār Fort

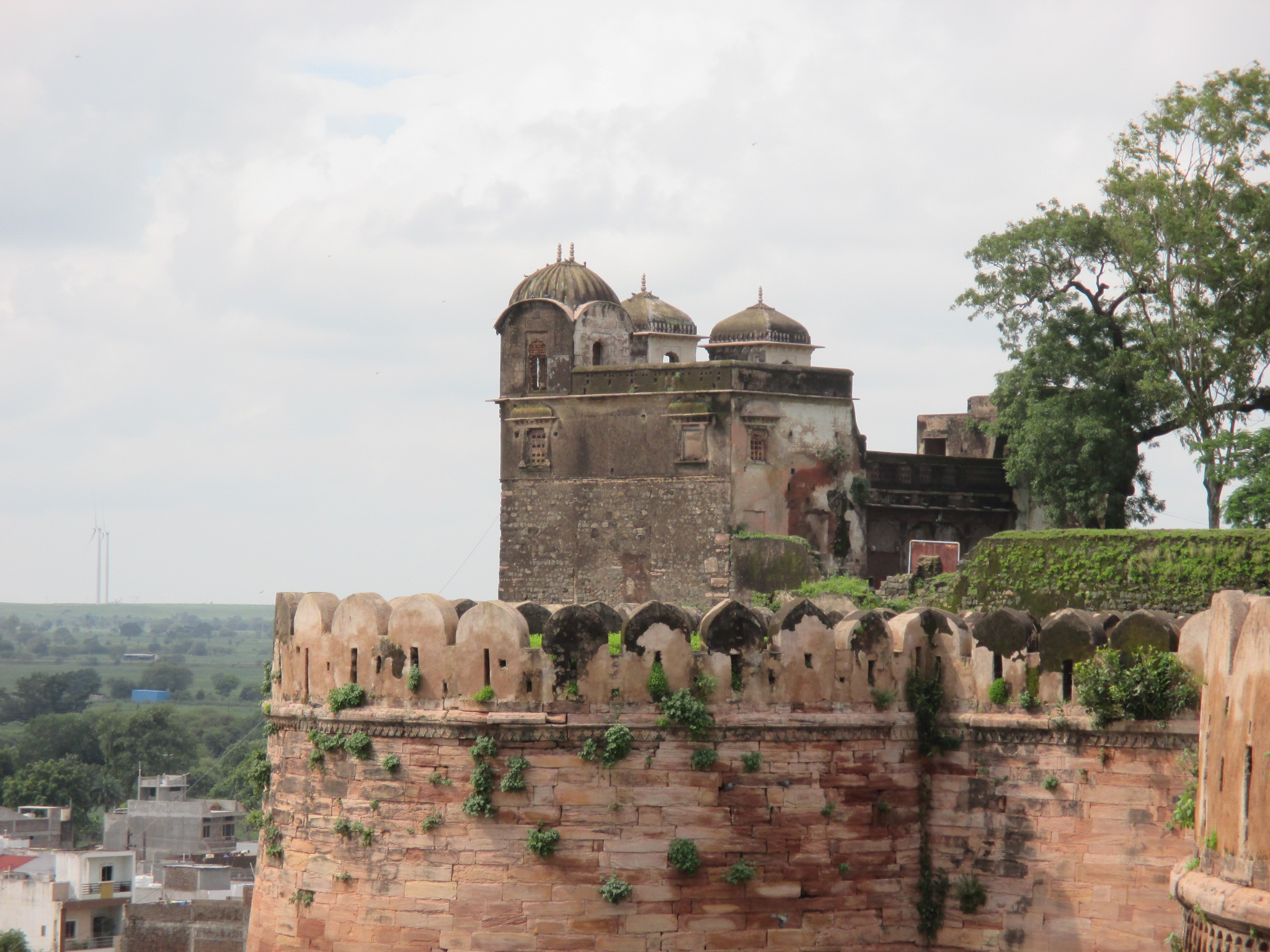
Kharbuza Mahal at the Dhār Fort

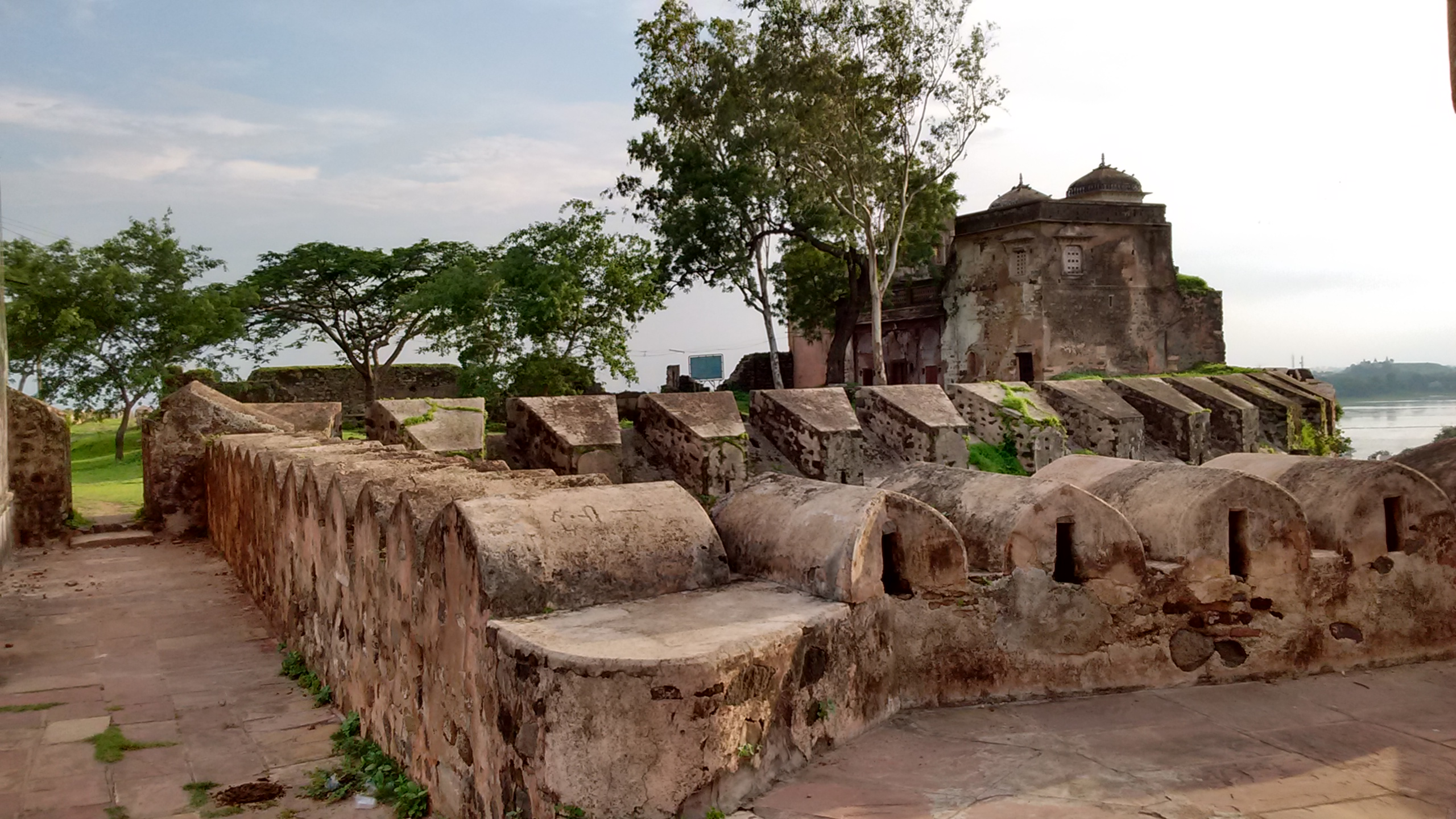
Kharbuza Mahal at the Dhār Fort

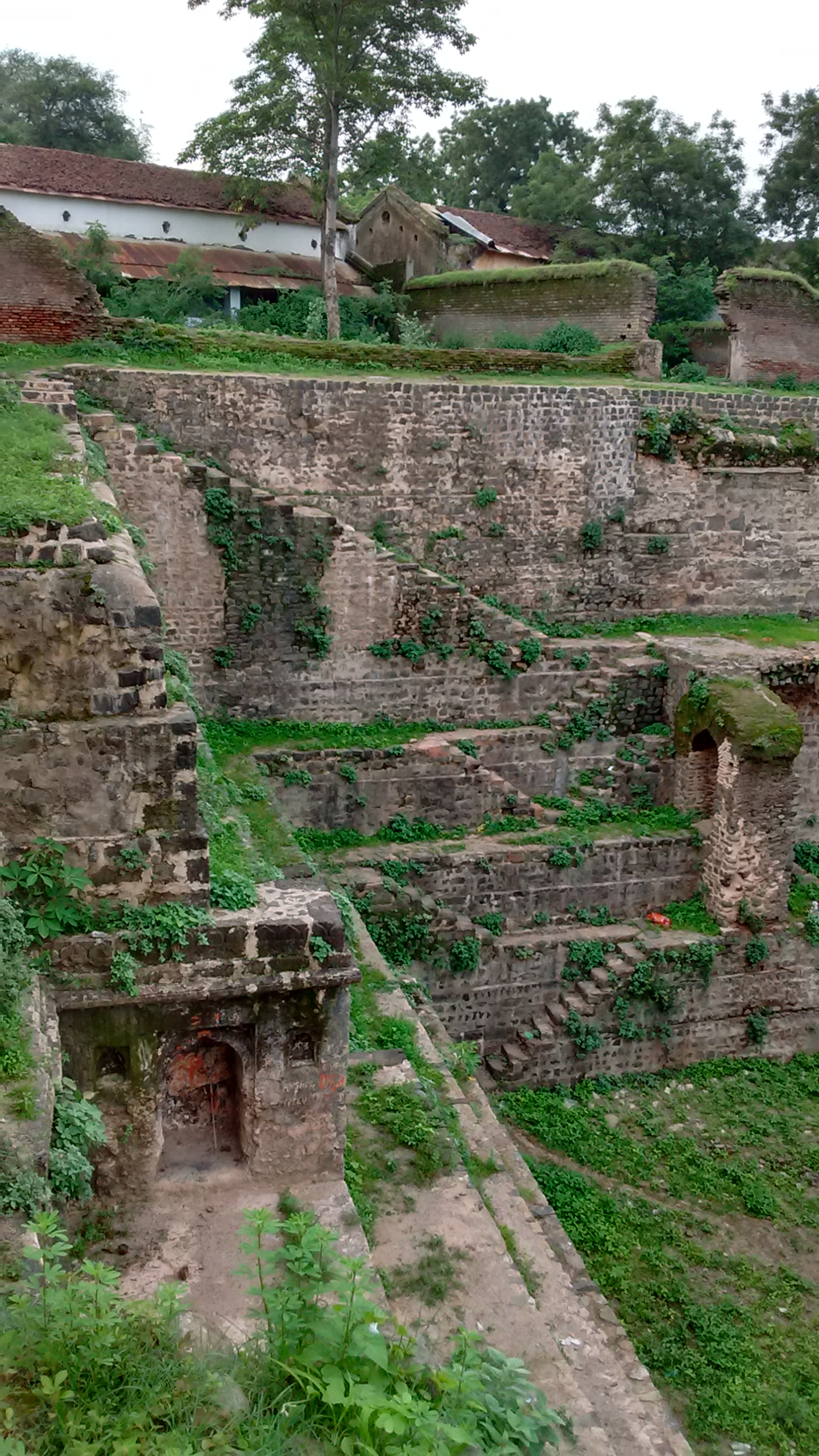
Entire view of Bawari (Water Source at the Dhār Fort)

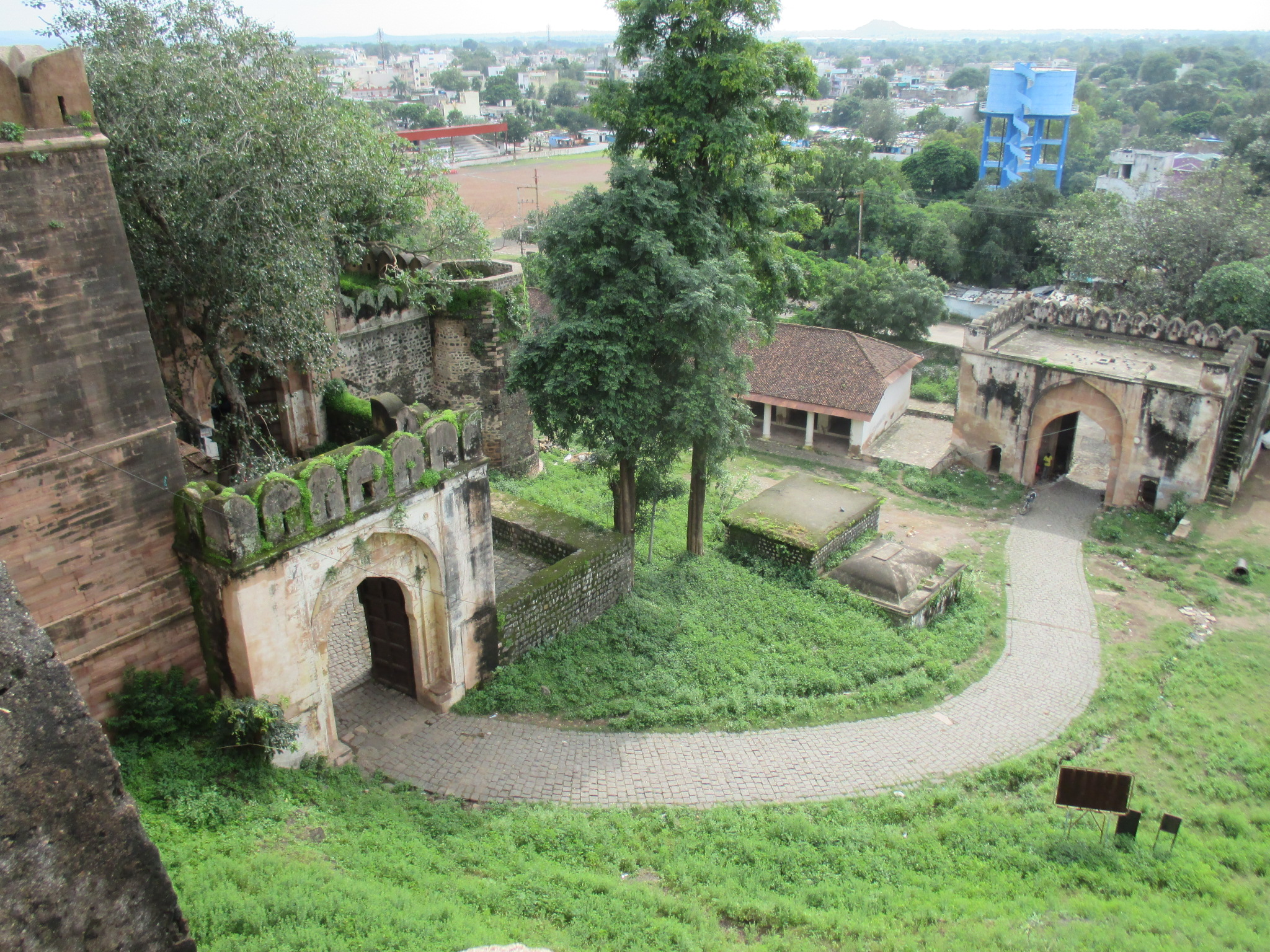
Entrance view from inside the fort at Dhār

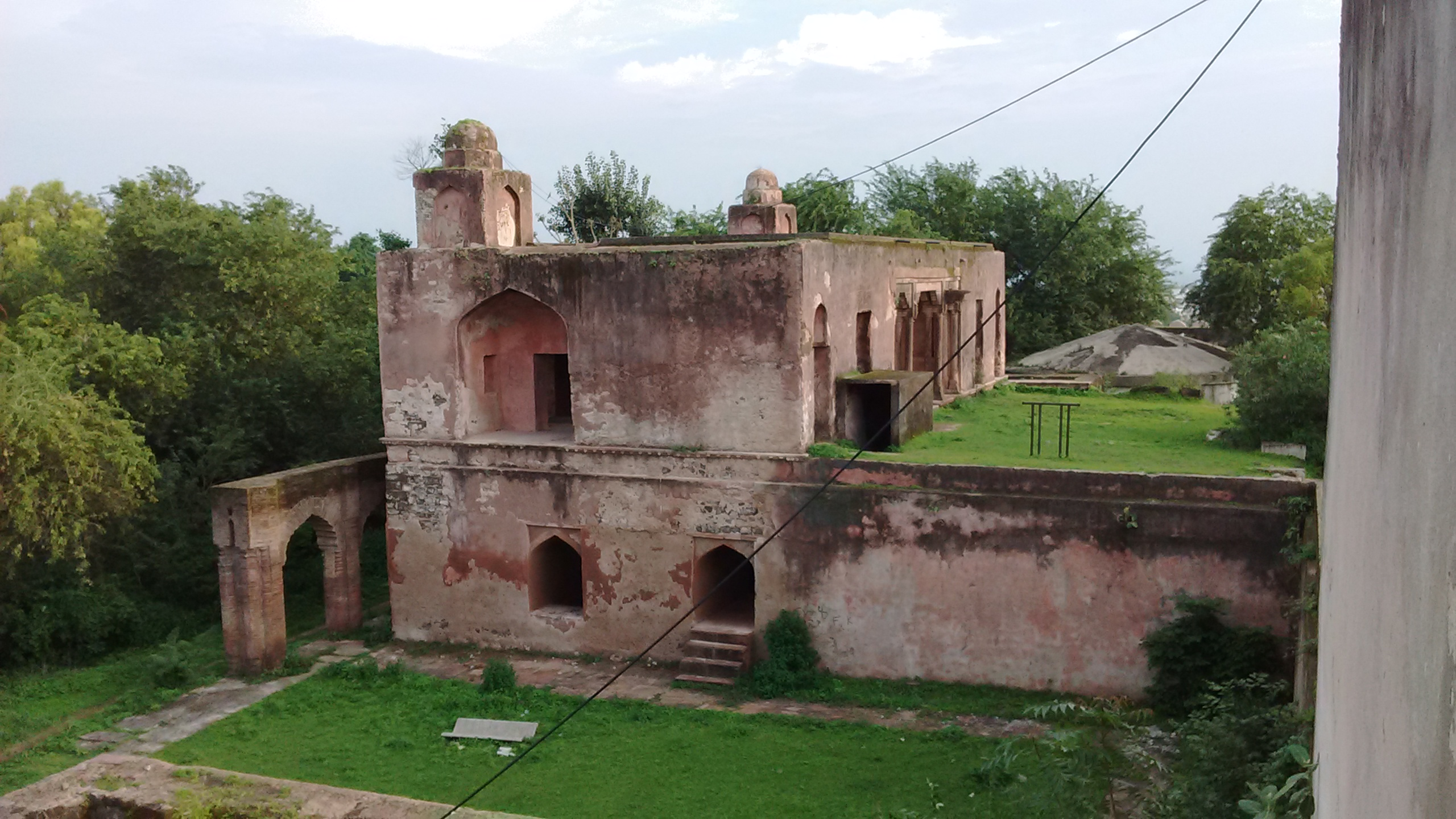
The Dhār Fort

== See also ==
- Bagh Print
- Bagh Caves
- Maratha Empire
- List of Maratha dynasties and states
- List of forts in India
- Dhar iron pillar
