= Lat Mosque =

Mosque in Dhar, Madhya Pradesh, India

- Lāṭ masjid
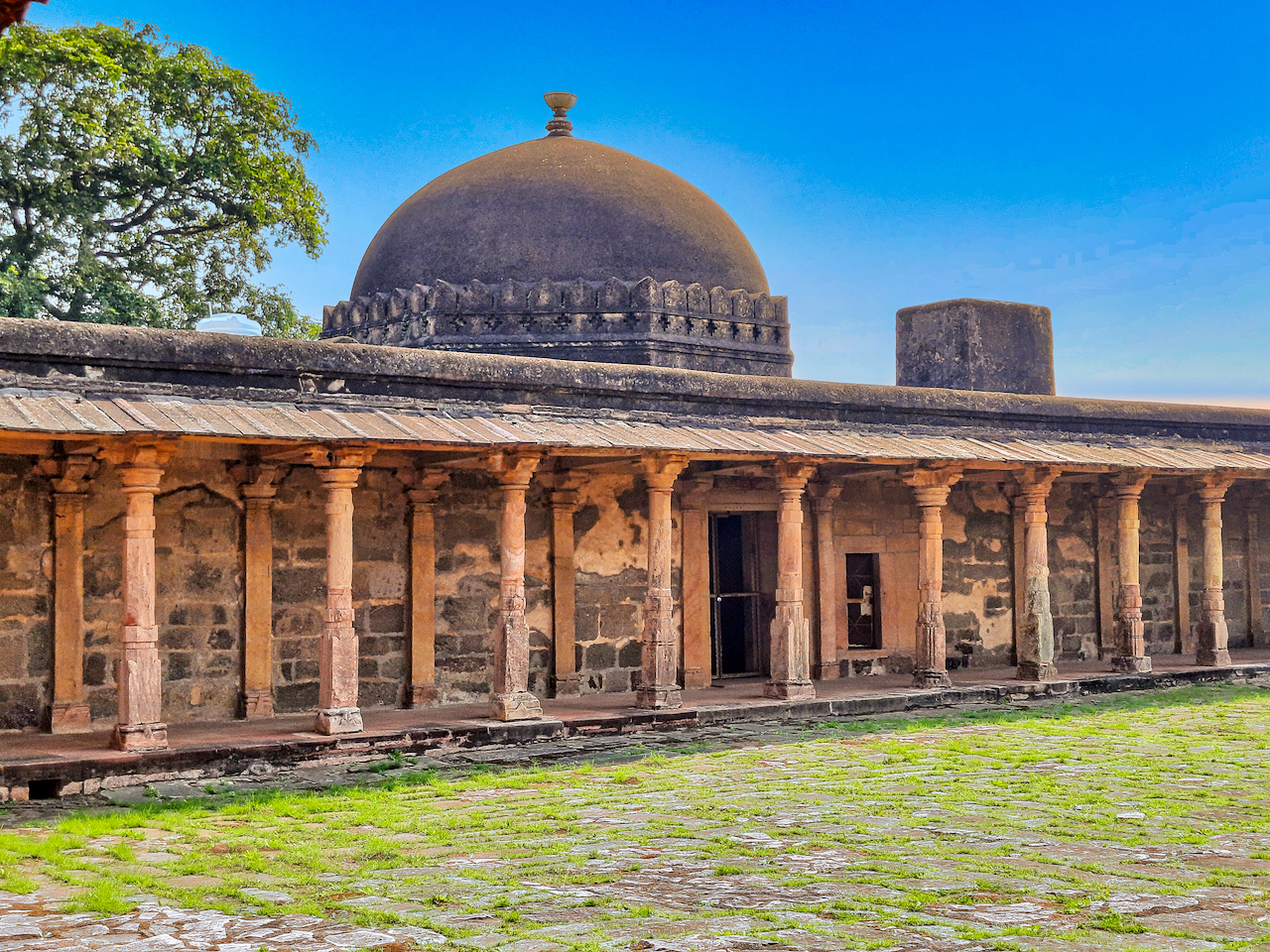
- The exterior of the Lat Mosque, in 2021

- Location of the mosque in Madhya Pradesh

Religion
- Affiliation: Islam
- Ecclesiastical or organizational status: Mosque
- Status: Active

Location
- Location: Dhar, Madhya Pradesh
- Country: India
- Interactive map of Lat Mosque
- Coordinates: 22°35′02″N 75°17′53″E

Architecture
- Type: Mosque architecture
- Style: Indo-Islamic
- Founder: Dilawar Khan
- Completed: 1405 CE
- Dome: One

Monument of National Importance
- Official name: Lāṭ Masjid
- Reference no.: N-MP-118

The Lat Mosque (Sanskrit: Lāṭ Masjid, lit. 'Pillar Mosque') is a mosque in Dhar in the state of Madhya Pradesh, India. Named after the Iron pillar of Dhar (called "lāṭ" in Hindi), it is also known as Lat ki masjid, Ladh Masjid, or Lath Masjid.

The Lāṭ Masjid is a Monument of National Importance protected by the Archaeological Survey of India under the Ancient Monuments and Archaeological Sites and Remains Act.

== History ==
The mosque was built in 1405 CE by Dilawar Khan as the Friday mosque to mark his declaration of independence from Delhi and the establishment of the Malwa Sultanate. The jami masjid is located at the edge of the city similar to other towns like Chanderi. Its name comes from the fragmentary iron pillar (lāṭ in Hindi) located in the compound.

== Architecture ==
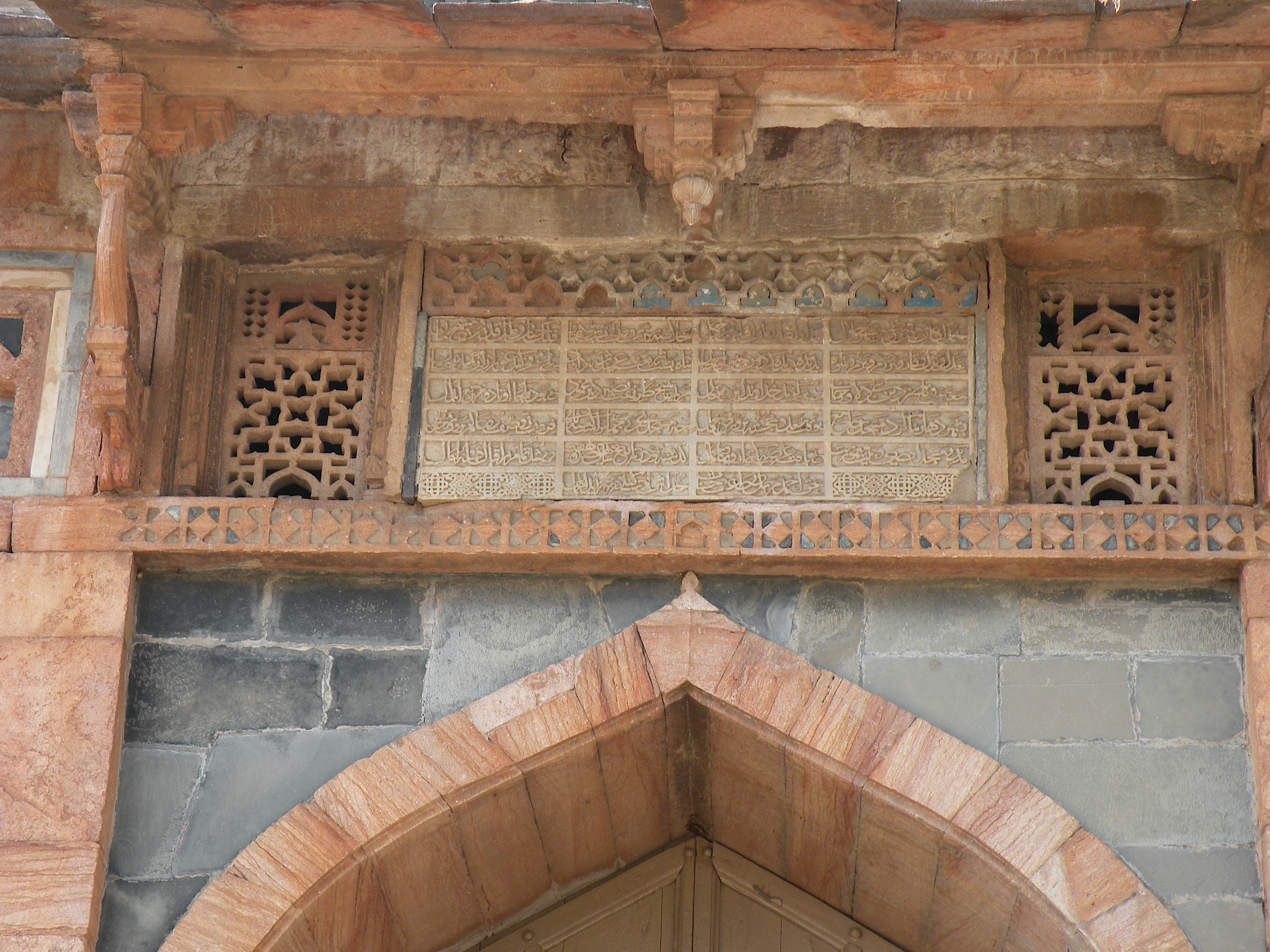
Inscription over the entrance of the Lāṭ masjid

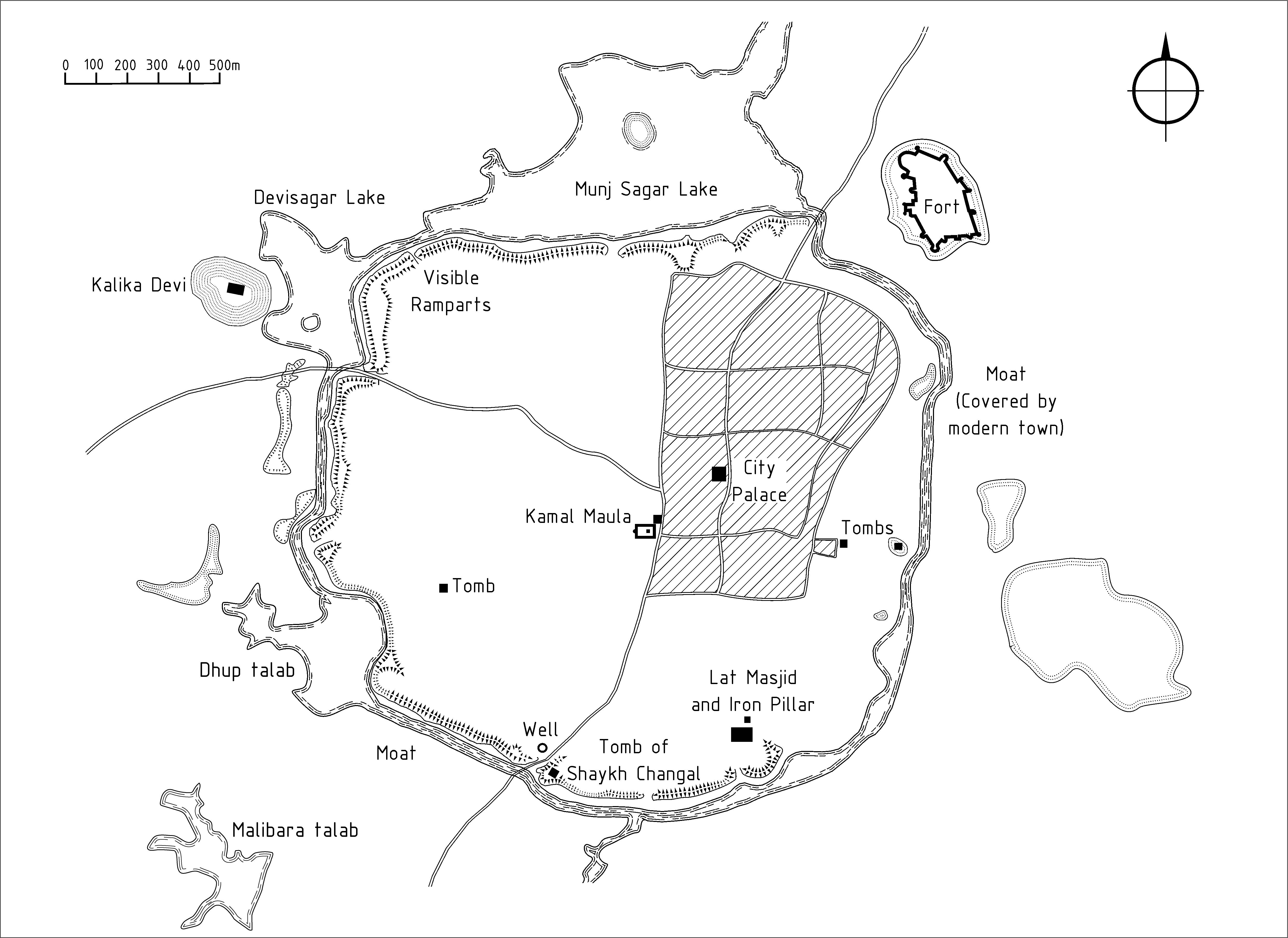
City plan of Dhar with the Lāṭ masjid near the south-eastern gate

The mosque consists of a large courtyard with post and lintel arcades on all sides. The arcades on the north, south, and east are shallow and only one bay deep. The prayer hall has four bays and a dome over the miḥrāb. The raised platform inside the prayer hall likely served as a royal gallery used by the Sultan comparable to the platform in the Adina Mosque in Pandua. The miḥrāb and minbar are modest harbingers of the Jama Masjid, Mandu, built about fifty years later by Hoshang Shah. Entrances feature a gatehouse built in the eclectic style favoured in the fourteenth and fifteenth centuries and also seen at Mān Mandir, Gwalior fort, Datia, Chanderi and Agra. Some pillars and lintels were purpose-made for the mosque, others were recycled from older temples and other structures. In his study of the iron pillar, Ramamurthy Balasubramanian of the Indian Institute of Technology, Kanpur, made unsubstantiated assertions about the origin and communal identity of the pillars; in fact, the original location, likely uses, and dates of the pillars remains unexplored.

=== Iron pillar ===
The mosque's name comes from its iron pillar, fragments of which are lying outside the building in the compound's gardens. Early rulers in Delhi used pillars in jami mosques also seen in the Qutb Minar complex and the Lat ki Masjid in Hissar. The pillar is not inscribed with a date, purpose, or patron. It bears early, undeciphered graffiti. Henry Cousens suggested the pillar was made under later Paramāra king Arjunavarman in 1210 CE from an enemy army's weapons. In 1531 CE, Dhar came under the sway of Bahādur Shāh of the Gujarat Sultanate. The Sultan of Gujarat attempted to move the pillar to Gujarat, but it broke. Documentation from 1912 shows the pillar lying diagonally against the platform.

=== Documentation and repair ===
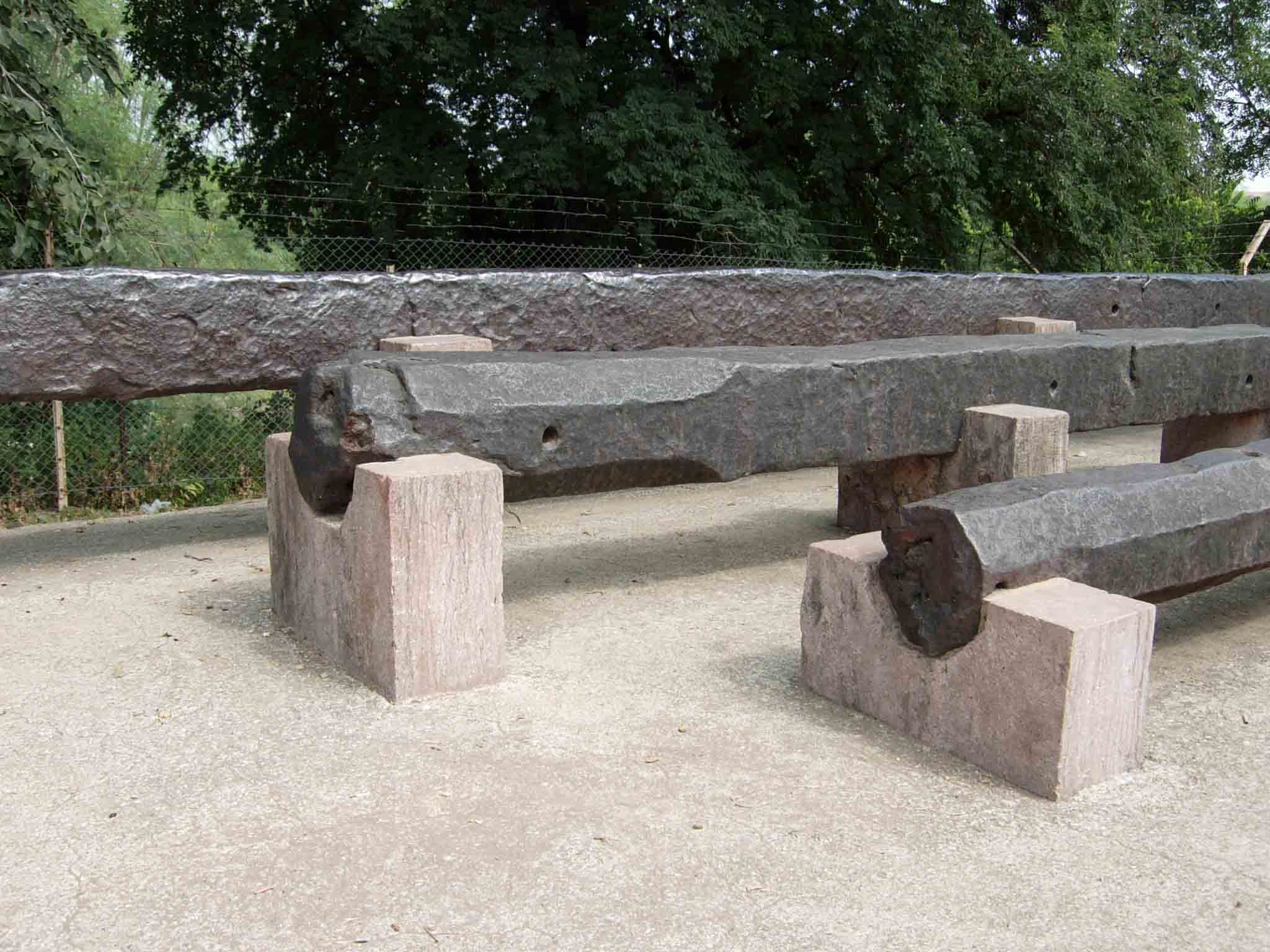
Fragments of the Dhar iron pillar conserved by the Archaeological Survey of India

The Lāṭ mosque has drawn the attention of visitors, scholars, and government officers. The earliest recorded important visitor was Emperor Akbar who left a Persian inscription on the iron pillar. In the colonial period, Captain E. Barnes noted the monument's considerable repair costs realized by Dhar Durbar (i.e. the Powars) and urged for further conservation work.

In 1939–40, the journalist Annemarie Schwarzenbach visited Dhar and photographed the mosque. Her photographs are an indispensable record of the state of monument at that time.

The iron pillar originally lay at an angle after the Sultan of Gujarat attempted to remove it in the sixteenth century. In the 1980s, the Archaeological Survey of India shifted the remains to a platform where all parts can now be seen. The large stone footing of the pillar is displayed nearby.

== Gallery ==
Photographs by Annemarie Schwarzenbach, 1939-1940

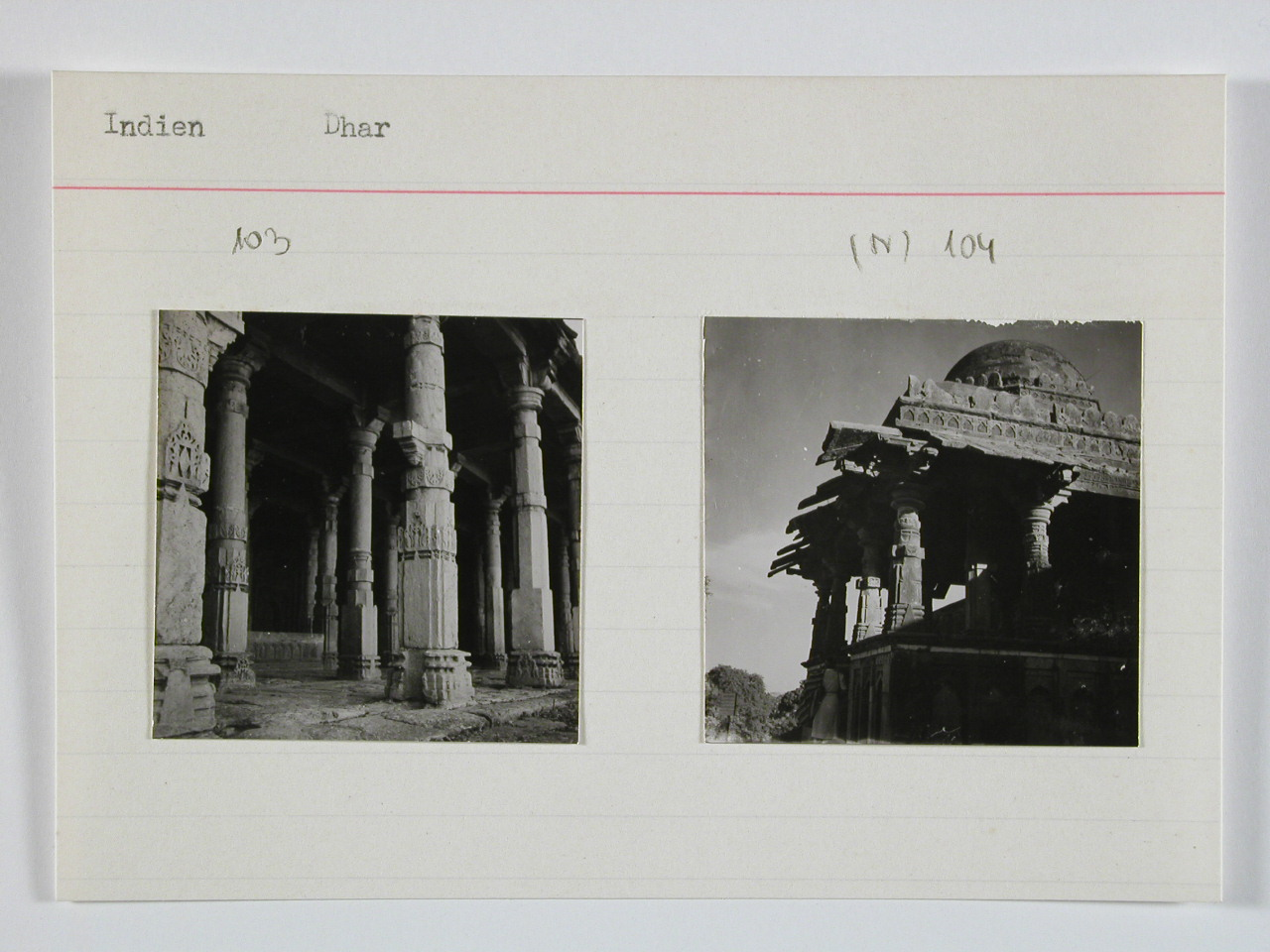

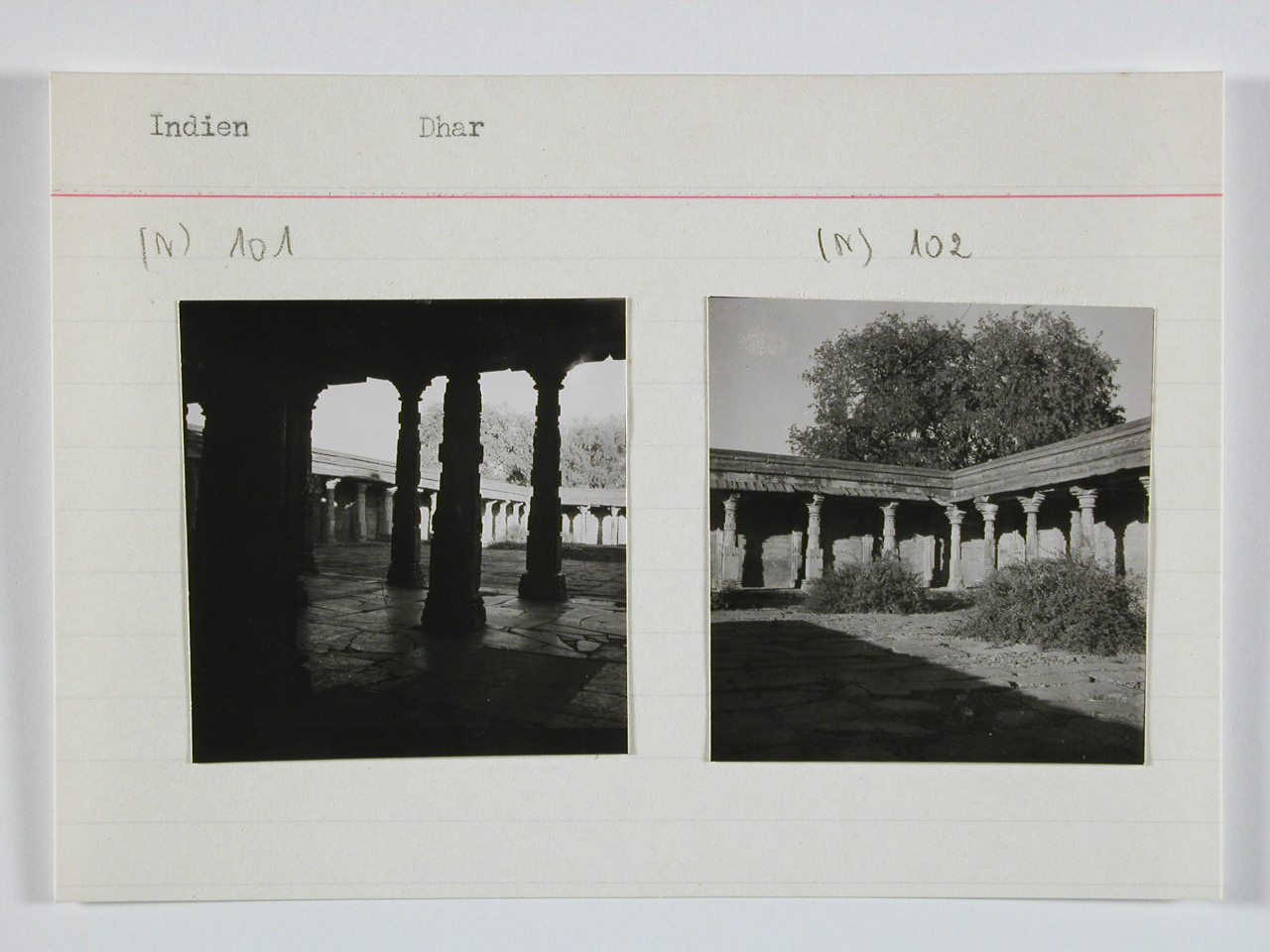

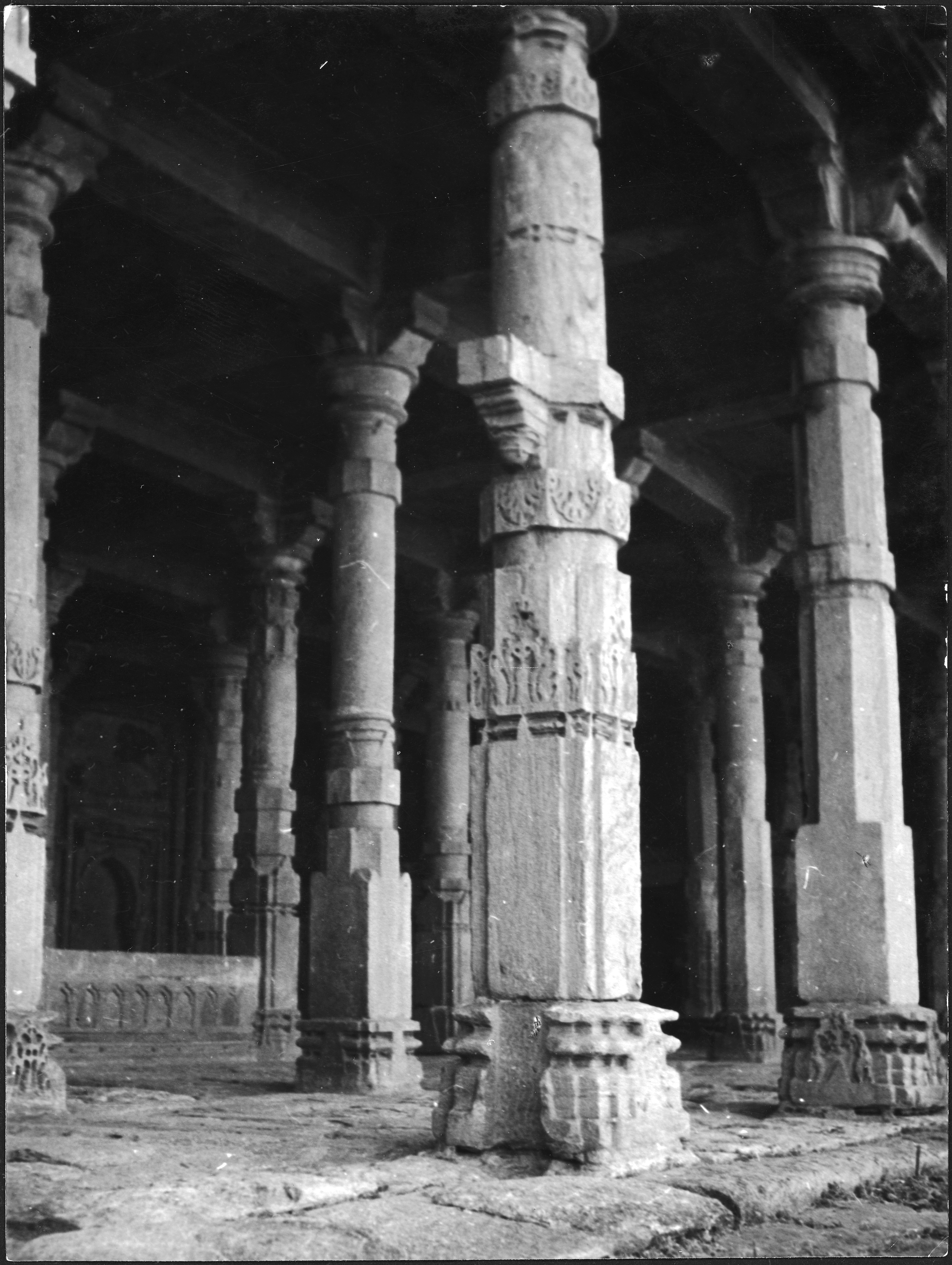

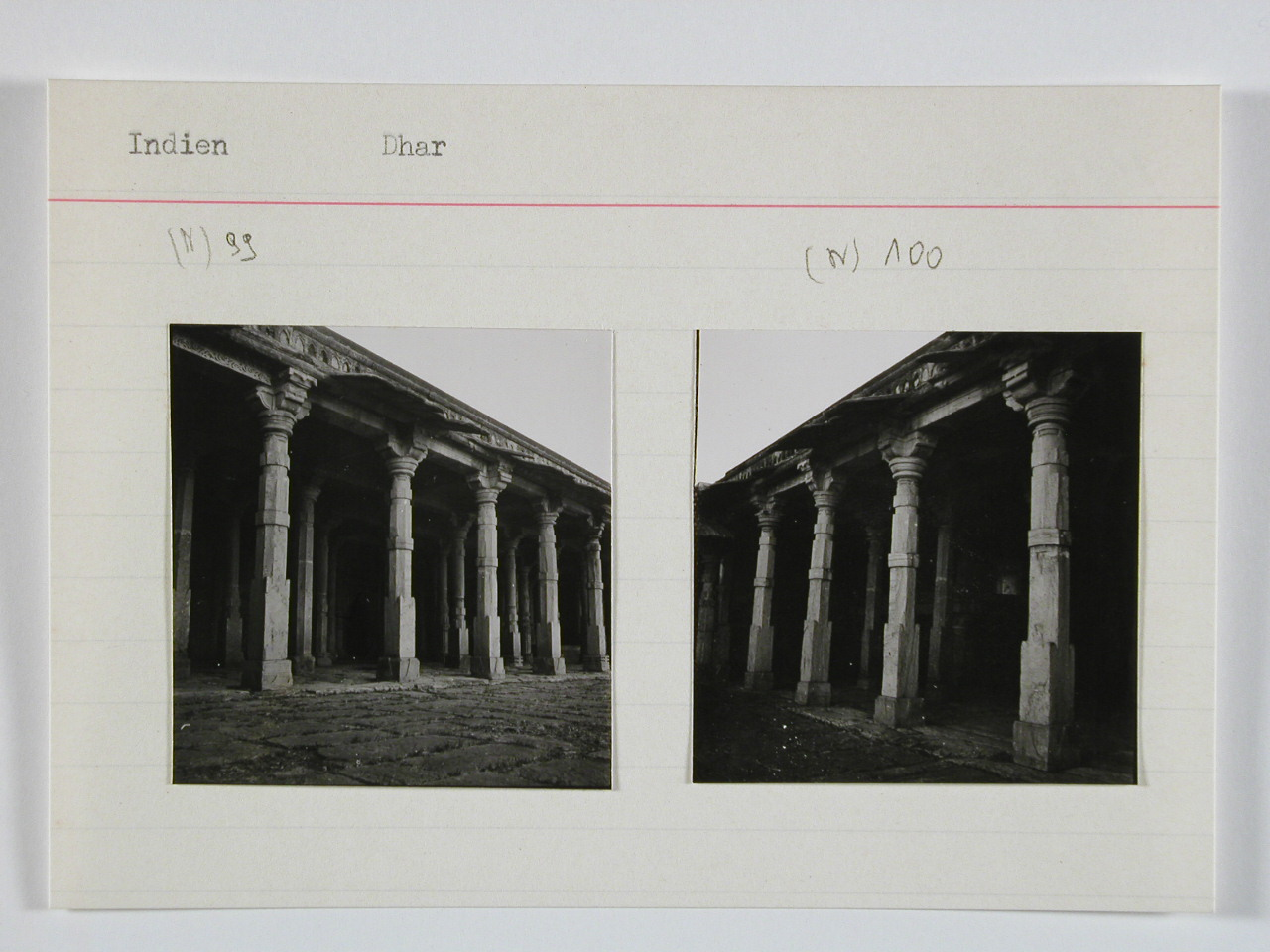

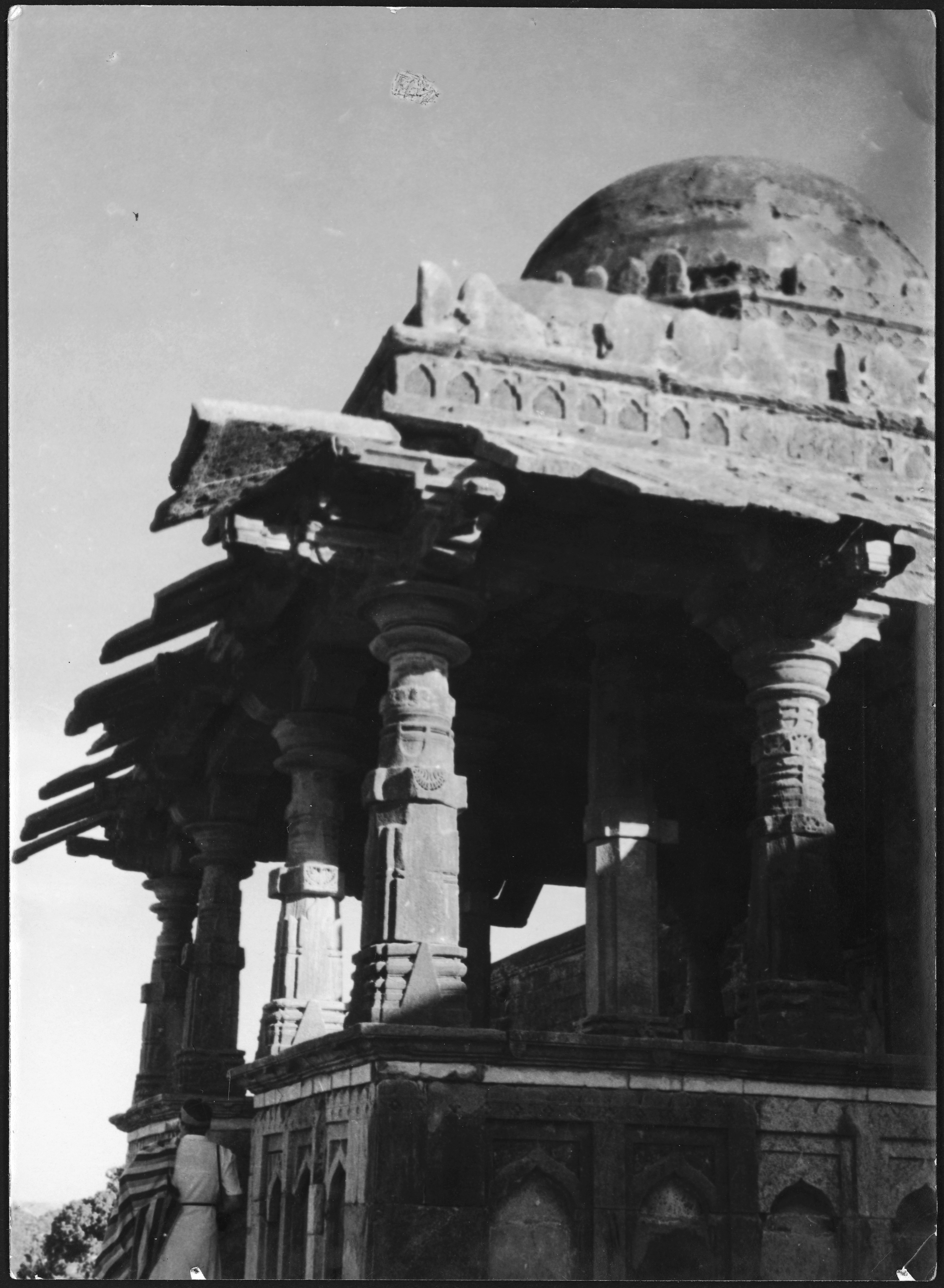

== See also ==
- Islam in India
- List of mosques in India
- List of Monuments of National Importance in Madhya Pradesh/West
