= Kamal Maula Mosque =

Monument in Dhar, Madhya Pradesh

Kamāl Maulā Mosque
- l Kamal Maula Mosque
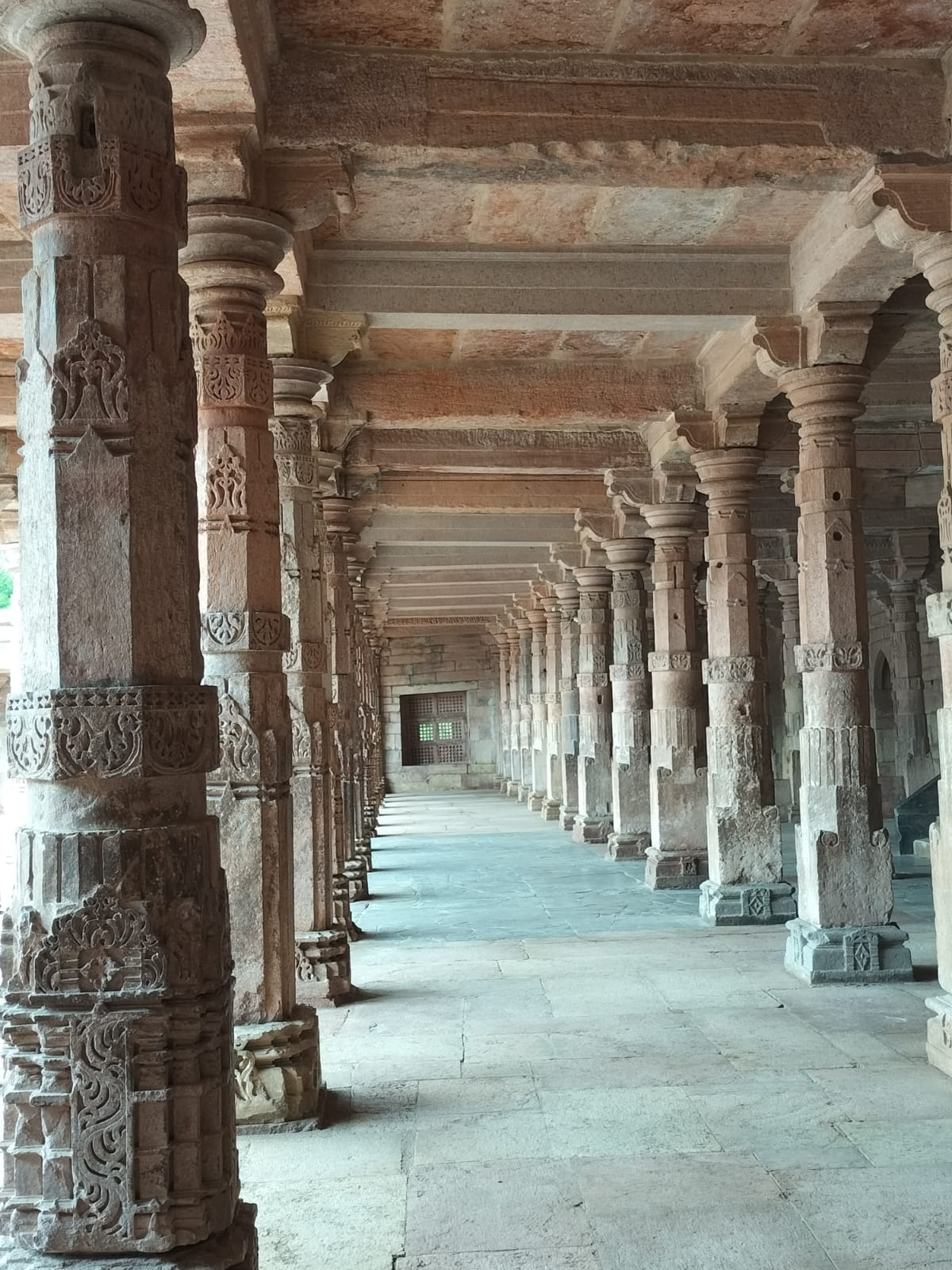
- Interior arcade of the mosque showing recycled pillars, with lintels and ceiling slabs repaired by the Archaeological Survey of India.

- Location of the mosque in Madhya Pradesh

Religion
- Affiliation: Sunni Islam
- Ecclesiastical or organisational status: Mosque
- Status: Protected monument

Location
- Location: Dhar, Madhya Pradesh
- Country: India
- Coordinates: 22°35′26″N 75°17′42″E

Architecture
- Type: Mosque architecture
- Style: Indo-Islamic
- Completed: 14th century (as a mosque)

Monument of National Importance
- Official name: Bhoj Shala
- Reference no.: N-MP-117

The Kamāl Maulā Mosque (Hindi: Kamāl maulā masjid), is a mosque in the city of Dhar, in the state of Madhya Pradesh, India. From 1903, the building also became known as the Bhojshala due to the efforts of K. K. Lele.

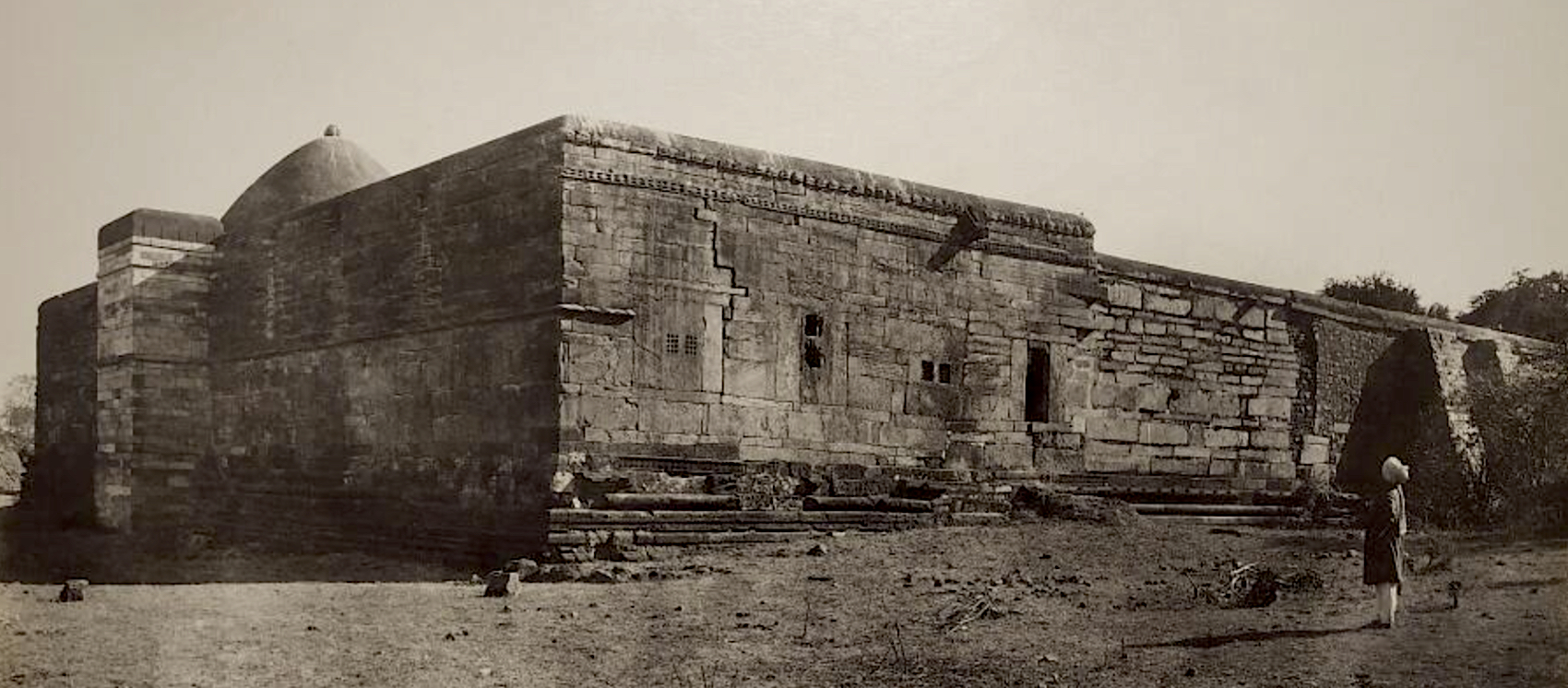
Exterior of the Kamāl Maula, from the south-west, as photographed by the Archaeological Survey in about 1924.

== Overview ==
The building and site appears in the list Monument of National Importance under the Archaeological Survey of India (ASI). Set in the centre of the old town, the building's history, ownership and use are disputed and are notionally claimed by both Muslims and Hindus, although the Republic of India has ultimate authority and jurisdiction over it. Until 2026, the ASI permitted Hindu worship on Tuesdays and Muslim worship on Fridays for two hours each week. Additionally, the site is open for worship of Sarasvatī on Vasant Panchami. When festivals coincided in the past, communal tensions arose, requiring a police presence to keep the peace. The rules set out in the Ancient Monuments and Archaeological Sites and Remains Rules 1959, published in The Gazette of India, govern day-to-day operations, management, and administration of the site.

Before Indian independence, the building was a protected monument under Dhar State and the Darbar issued a decree in 1935 stating that "From the use of the word 'Bhojshala' at the beginning, it should never be assumed that this protected royal building will be converted into any other form. Just as prayers (Namaz) are offered at this time and there is no restriction upon them, similarly, in the future as well, there shall be no prohibition on offering prayers herein. This is a mosque, and in the future, it shall remain a mosque." In May 2026, the Madhya Pradesh High Court subverted this decree and gave the right to worship at the disputed Bhojshala Temple-Kamal Maulā Mosque Complex to the Hindu and Jain community, based on a survey conducted by the Archaeological Survey of India (ASI). The court said that it drew on the 2024 ASI survey and the principles laid down by the Supreme Court of India, further suggesting that Muslim community ask for an alternative site from the state government. The parties involved in the case have appealled to the Supreme Court of India and the outcomes are awaited.

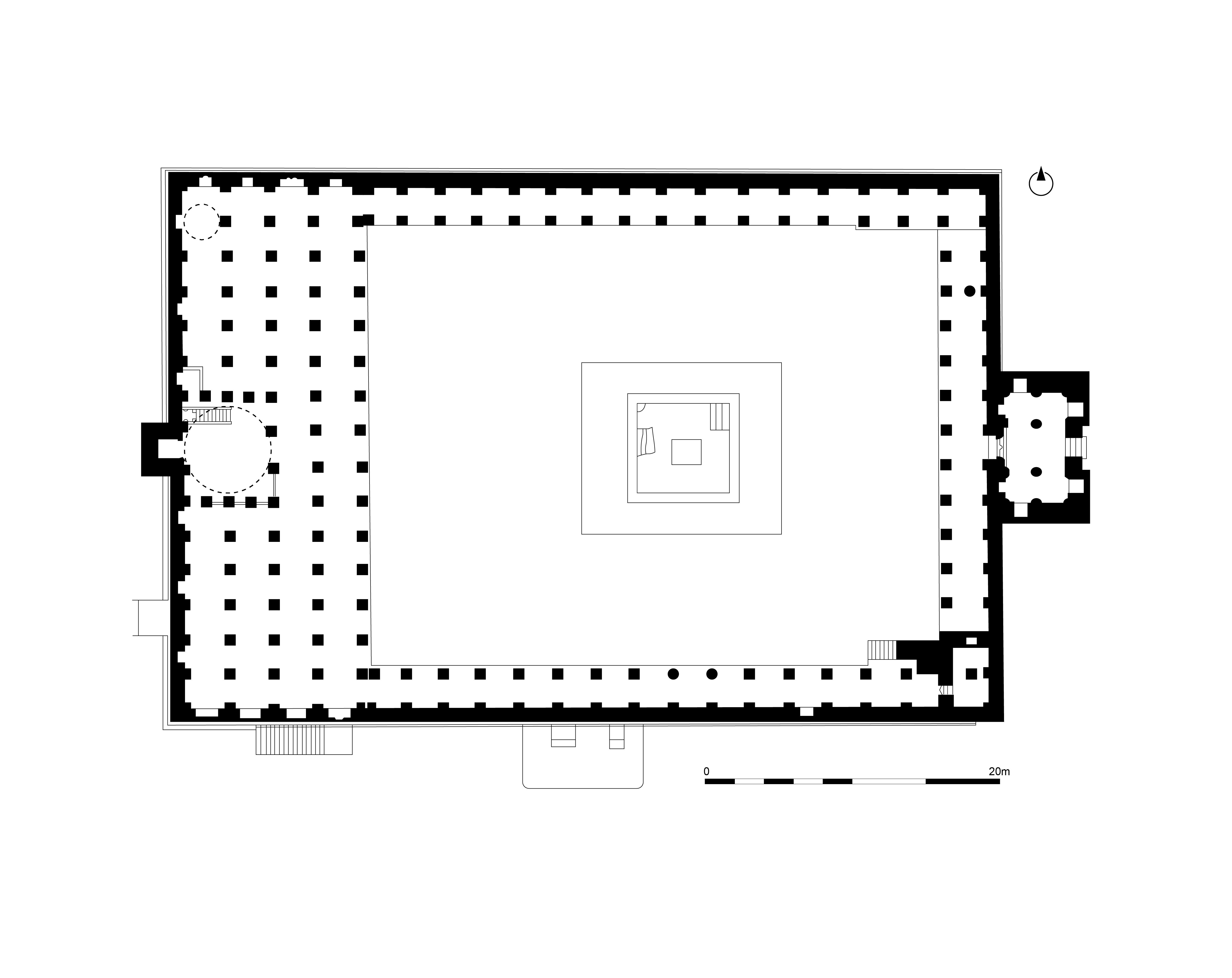
Dhār (Madhya Pradesh). Plan of the Kamāl Maulā masjid showing position of the western dome, illustrated below.

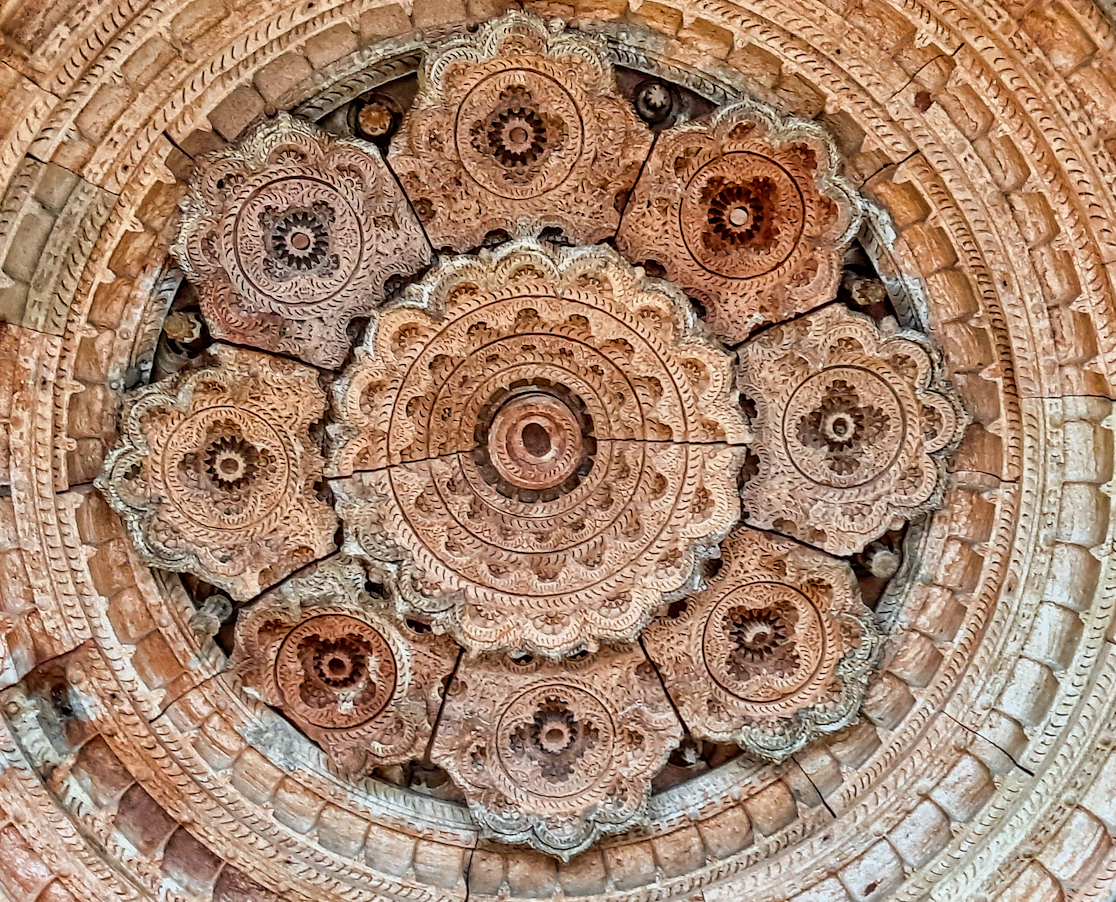
Dhār (Madhya Pradesh). Detail of the interior of the main dome in the prayer hall above the miḥrāb and minbar. There are no brackets or corbels with figurative sculpture or traces of sculpture otherwise, as at the Kumbharia Jain temples, indicating the dome was reassembled in a way that excused these elements.

== Location and early history ==
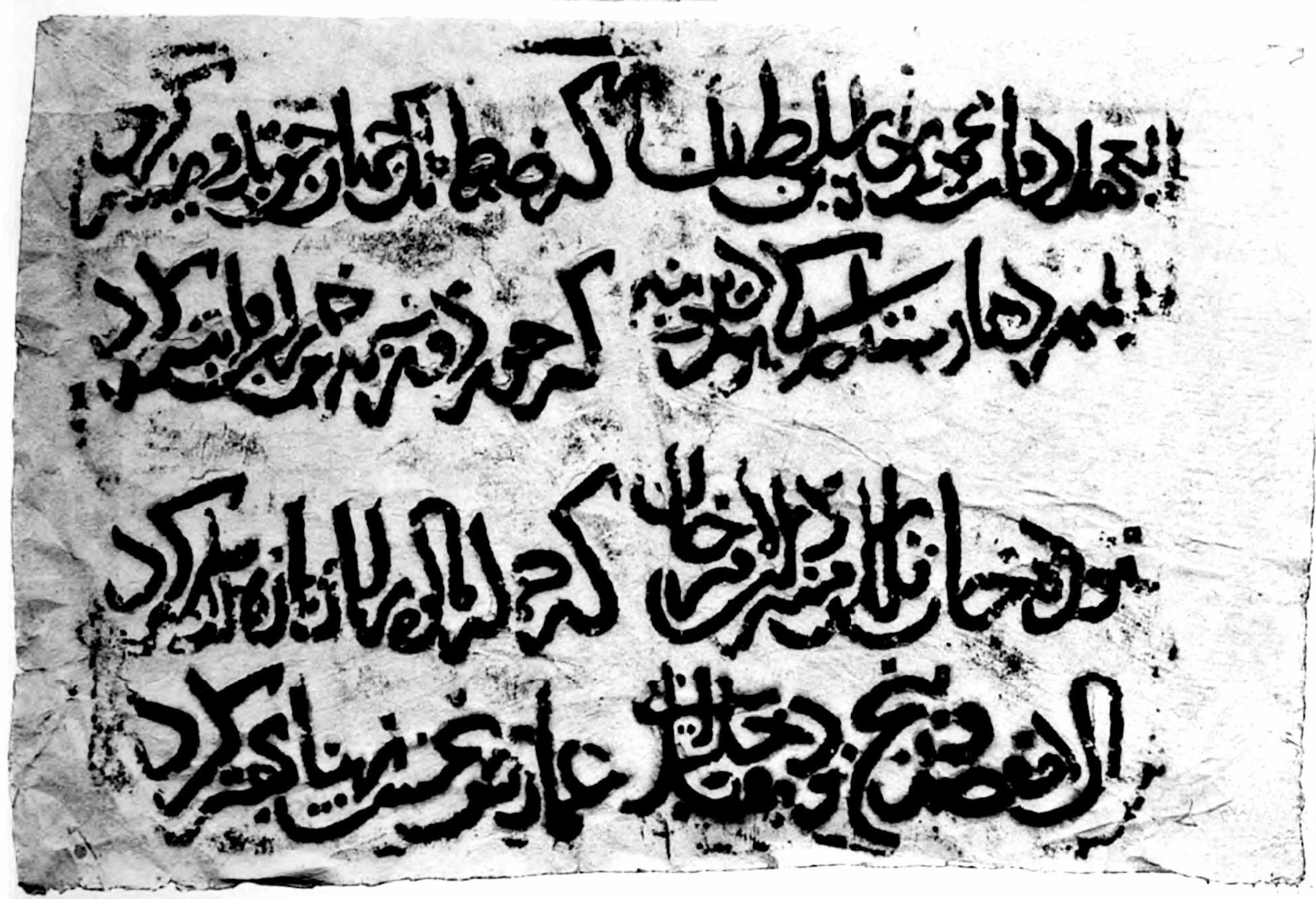
Inked impression of the inscription of Dilāwar Khān recording renovation of the mosque in AH 795 (CE 1392-93). Current whereabouts unknown.

The monument is located in the middle of the medieval circular city of Dhar, likely built by the Paramara dynasty from the 10th century. The city was long one of the capitals of Malwa and the seat of the provincial government in later centuries, becoming the Maratha capital of the Powars in the 18th century. A prominent centre of education, manuscripts compilation, exchange and cattle trading, it also seems to have been a centre of metallurgy, as suggested by the name Dhārānagara (city of swords) and the iron pillar found there (see Dhar iron pillar). After a number of wars between the Pramāras and the Western Chalukya Empire, the Seuna (Yadava) dynasty, the Chaulukya dynasty of Gujarat and the Vaghela dynasty, in the course of which Dhār was repeatedly sacked and burned, Malwa came part of the Delhi Sultanate in opening years of the 14th century under Ayn al-Mulk Multani. The Kamāl Maula masjid was put up soon after, but the exact year is not recorded. An inscription found beside the building dated 1392-93 CE describes repairs by Dilāwar Khān, the then governor (see illustration here). At some stage after the death of Chishti Sufi saint Kamāl al-Din in about 1331 CE, his tomb was placed next to the mosque and the building came to be known as Kamāl Maula mosque. This suggests the building was constructed shortly after 1304-05 (the beginning of the tenure of Ayn al-Mulk Multani as governor) and before 1331 (the death of Kamāl-al-Dīn).

== Architecture ==
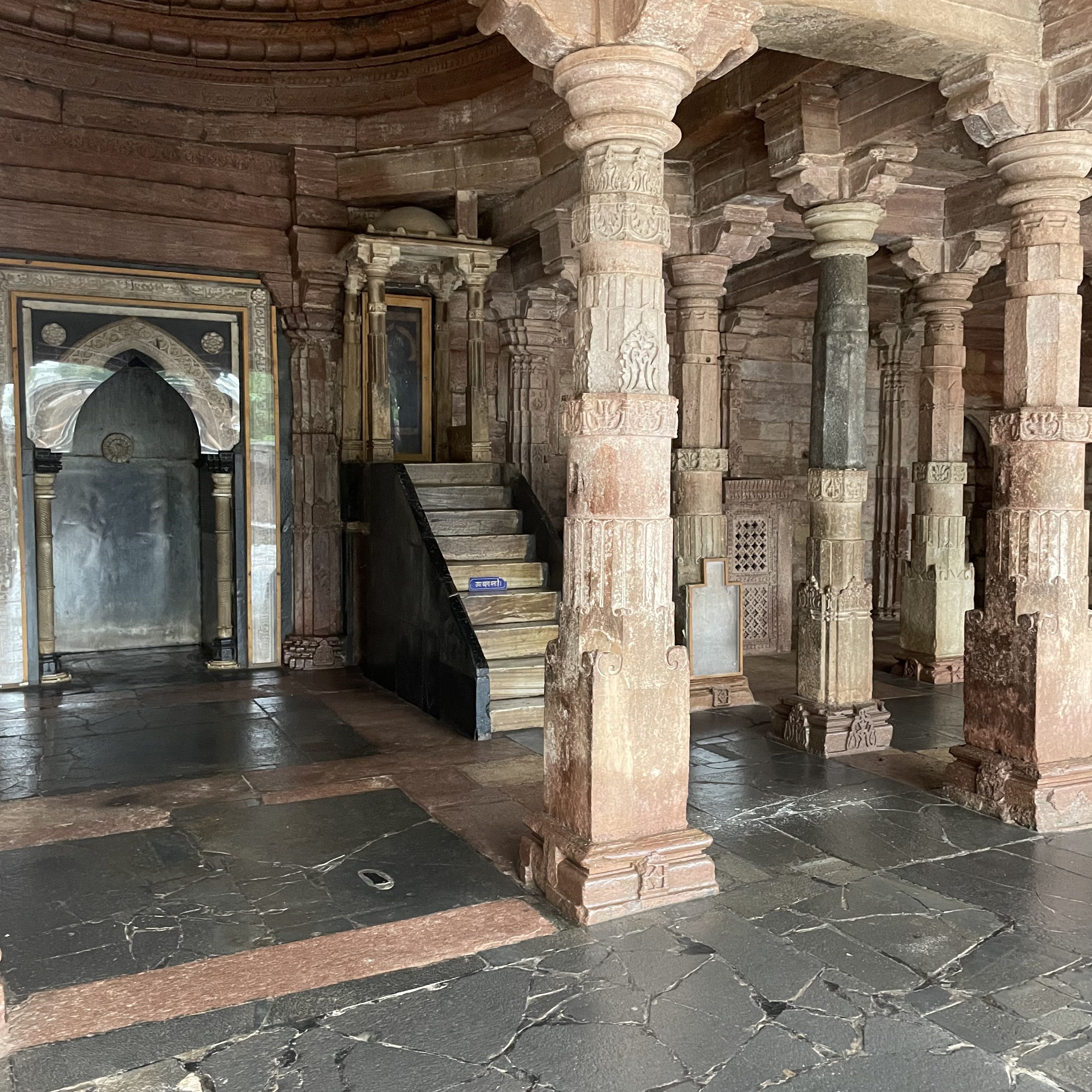
Dhār (Madhya Pradesh). Kamāl Maula, interior of the prayer hall, showing the miḥrāb and minbar. The slab with the Rāüla vela of Roḍa was once placed on the floor of the minbar but was removed to Mumbai by John Malcolm. The serpentine tablet with the sound system of the Sanskrit language is on the right, displayed upright against a pillar.

The building is rectangular in plan, with a gatehouse on the east side and a prayer hall on the west. Narrow arcades run around the north, south and west sides. The arched entrance to the gatehouse was rebuilt in the time of Powars, probably in the 19th century, but the interior features are original. The inscription (illustrated here) was likely removed when the entrance was refurbished. The south wall of the building has been in a precarious state for more than a century and several parts of the wall toward the east appear to have been rebuilt; large buttresses were installed outside to support south wall beginning in the 1920s if not before and have since been strengthened.

Internally, the building has numerous sandstone pillars of varying design, with most of these dating to the 12th and 13th centuries. The pillars were not simply re-cycled, but put one on top of the other to raise the height of the ceiling. This follows the building practices seen at Ajmer and the Qutb complex in Delhi. In two places, domes of trabeate construction, decorated with intricate cusps and lotus forms, have been added. The miḥrāb and minbar are later in date, likey added in the late 1300s by Dilawar Khan, the first king of Mandu under the Malwa Sultanate. The miḥrāb is notable for its cubical shape, a design that was consciously based on the Kaaba in Mecca. The practice is not unique to Dhār and has been noted in the Deccan. In the south-east corner is a small cell or khazāna. Some inscriptions and antiquities were recovered here in 2024. A square tank or Hawz is located in the middle of the courtyard. Ernest Barnes, the one time political agent, regarded this tank as a modern addition and sought its removal. His suggestion was not heeded however.

== Inscriptions ==
The building contains a range of stone panels with Sanskrit and Prakrit inscriptions collected from different places and installed on the walls and floors, apparently assembled for display in medieval times rather like a modern museum, with K. K. Lele referring to it as "a sort of standing library".There are more than 150 inscription fragments from the site, the most important being as follows:

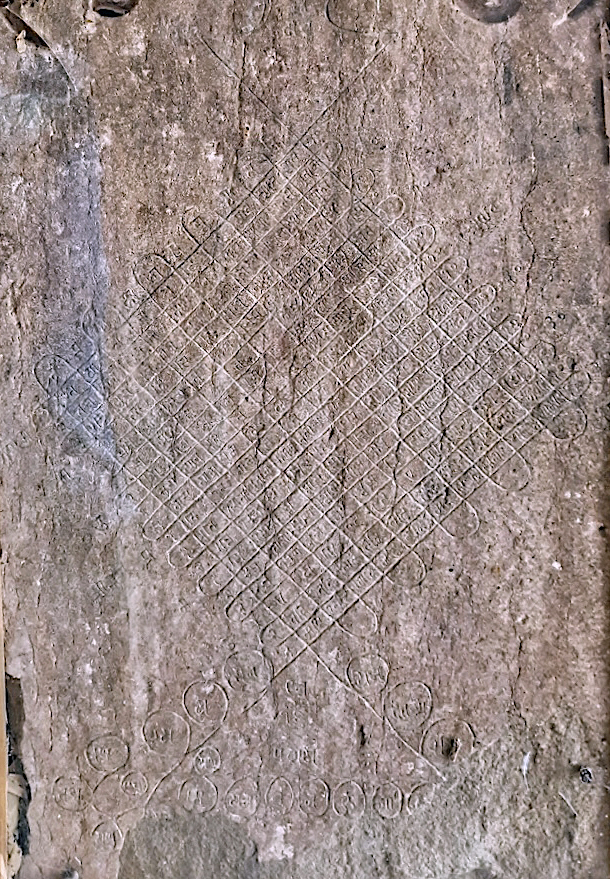
The second serpentine diagram in the Kamāl Maula, on a pillar south of the miḥrāb, 12th century

=== Grammatical inscriptions: Serpentine scimitars of Udayāditya and Naravarman ===
The oldest dated inscriptions in the building contains two serpentine grammatical diagrams inscribed on the lower parts of pillars . One is located directly to the right of the minbar and was registered as pillar 50 in the survey conducted in 2024 by the Archaeological Survey of India (see illustration). These records, which contain the system of Sanskrit phonology and grammar, are what prompted K. K. Lele to describe the building as the 'Bhojshala' or Hall of Bhoja because king Bhoja was the author of a number of works on poetics and grammar, among them the Sarasvatīkaṇṭhābharaṇa or 'Necklace of Sarasvatī'. The colophon of one grammatical chart, however, mentions that it is the "unique magical sword belonging to kings Udayāditya and Naravarman". The earliest date that can be assigned to these records is thus Naravarman, a Paramāra king who ruled circa 1094–1133. Because Bhoja died about 1055 CE, this means the oldest inscriptions at the site are more than a century after his time.

=== Rāüla vela of Roḍa ===
The remaining inscriptions belong to circa 1200 CE, either based on their date or paleographical style. The first inscription to be taken from the site was removed by John Malcolm from the minbar of the Kamāl Maula (see illustration). This is now identified as the Rāüla vela of Roḍa, a unique poetic work in the earliest forms of Hindi.

=== Kodaṇḍakāvya ===
The Kodaṇḍakāvya was a very large work that contained more that 572 stanzas in Prakrit. Some of its parts were removed to the museum in Dhār fort where they are currently on display.

=== The Kūrmaśataka ===
This inscription was found by K. K. Lele in 1903 in the miḥrāb, the inscribed text turned inward. It consists of two poems in Prakrit praising Kūrma. This is not the well-known Kūrma incarnation of the god Viṣṇu, but rather the primal tortise or Ādikūrma. The inscription is currently on display inside the building. An edition and translation appeared in 2003 by V. M. Kulkarni.

=== The Vijayaśrīnāṭikā ===
This inscription, like the Kūrmaśataka, was found by K. K. Lele in 1903 in the miḥrāb, the text again turned inward. It is a Sanskrit drama called Vijayaśrīnāṭikā composed by Madana, the preceptor of king Arjunavarman. The inscription opens with an invocation to Śiva and reports that the play was performed before Arjunavarman in the temple of Sarasvatī. The play refers to the temple under various names—Bhāratī bhavana, Śāradā sadman—and says that it was “the chief temple that adorned the eighty-four cross-roads of Dhar.” Old Dhār being laid out as a grid, the main temple would have stood at the centre. Only the first two acts of the play are preserved, the final acts would have been given in a second tablet that has not been located. The inscription is currently on display inside the building, just inside the entrance. The Sarasvatī mentioned in this record stands at the heart of current controversies about the building (see below, The Bhojshala controversy).

== Restoration after 1903 ==
The removal of the two large inscriptions from the miḥrab necessitated the comprehensive repair and renovation of this feature in 1903 as recorded in the Annual Report of the Archaeological Survey of India. Further repairs happened in 1915, as recorded in the Progress Report, Archaeological Survey of India, Western Circle.

== Shifting of Pillars to the South Arcade in 2004 ==
At the end January 2004, the Archaeological Survey of India surreptitiously shifted two carved pillar to the building, placing them behind a protective grill in the south arcade. This caused consternation in the local community and prompted calls for the pillars to be removed to a museum as their presence distorted the historical character of the building. The calls were not heeded and the pillars remained in the building at the time of the Survey's 2024 census.

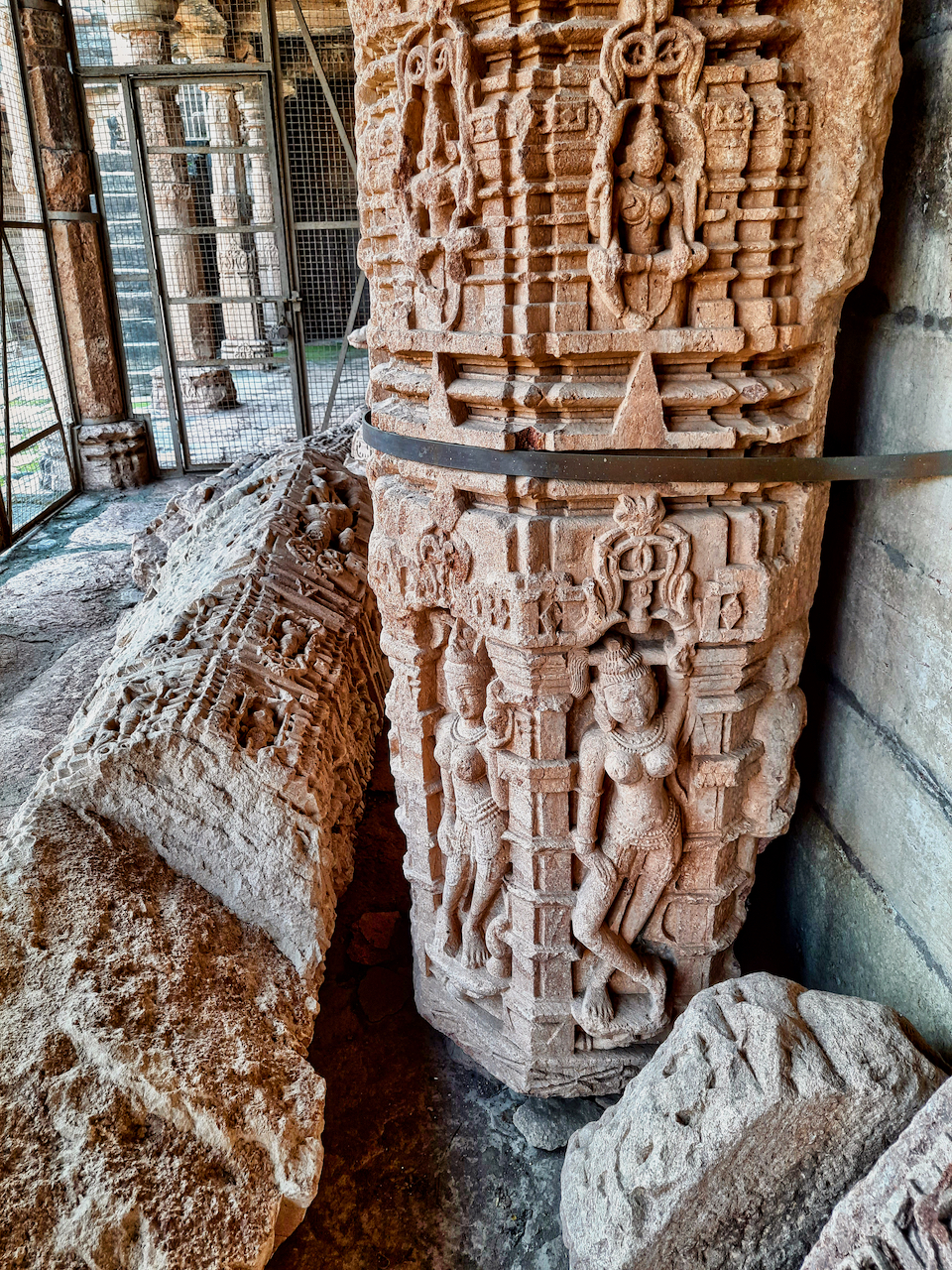
Dhār (Madhya Pradesh). Pillars shifted to the building in 2004 and now placed behind a protective grill in the south arcade. The original find-spot of the pillars has not been traced.

== The Bhojshala controversy ==
=== Emergence of the Bhojshala terminology ===
Captain E. Barnes, writing in 1904, reported only that the mosque was "known among the Hindoo (sic.) population as 'Raja Bhoja ka Madrassa', i.e. Raja Bhoja's school." Charles E. Luard in his Gazetteer of 1908 also called it Raja Bhoja's school. Thus while Bhoja had long been linked to the complex by tradition, the term Bhojshala became associated with the building only in 1903 due to the efforts of K. K. Lele, the Superintendent of State Education and head of the archaeology department in Dhar State. He based the name on the poetic inscriptions and incised geometric drawings found at the site. Eugen Hultzsch, in his publication of the Dhār inscription of Arjunavarman in Epigraphia Indica of 1905-06, referred to a paper sent to him by Lele that described the discovery of the Sanskrit and Prakrit inscriptions at the 'Bhoja Shala'. The use was established in the scholarly literature at that point. A copy of Lele's 1903 paper was secured by S. K. Dikshit, who printed it in his study and translation of Pārijātamañjarī. By the 1930s, the term Bhojshala was established, with rulings issued by Dhar State referring to it under this rubric.

=== Emergence of the Sarasvatī connections ===
Historians have noted that a Jaina statue of Ambikā mentioning Sarasvatī was found at the site of the City Palace when the building was being rebuilt in 1875. The inscription on the pedestal (see Ambika Statue from Dhar), mentions a statue of Vāgdevī (i.e. Sarasvatī), showing that the Sarasvatī at Dhār was the Jain form of this goddess. This is confirmed by the Prabandhacintāmaṇi of Merutunga, a text of the early 1300s, that records how the Jain savant Dhanapāla showed king Bhoja tablets engraved with his poem to Adinātha at the entrance to the temple of Sarasvatī at Dhār. The Hindu form of Sarasvatī is known from an inscription found at Mandu rather than Dhār and was published by K. K. Lele in 1926.

=== Religious claims ===
The building has been the focus of communal claims since the time of Lele's discoveries. In response to earlier agitation, the Diwan of Dhar State issued an order stating that the building was a mosque in 1935. More recently, in 2024, claims about the building reached the Indore Bench of the Madhya Pradesh High Court, and Justices S. A. Dharmadhikari and Devnarayan Mishra instructed that a study is necessary to “demystify” the nature of the complex. The Bench observed that “till and until the character or nature of the place of worship or shrine is not determined, decided or ascertained, the purpose of the building is bound to be enveloped in mystery.” Moreover, “The detailed arguments at the Bar by all the contesting parties fortify the court’s belief and assumption that the nature and character of the whole monument admittedly maintained by the Central government needs to be demystified and freed from the shackles of confusion.” The Archaeological Survey of India undertook a detailed survey and assessment as a result, their report in ten volumes released in 2024. The findings indicate that the mosque was built using parts of ancient temples.

In May 2026, the Indore bench of the Madhya Pradesh High Court, declared the disputed Bhojshala Temple-Kamal Maula Mosque Complex in Dhar a temple dedicated to Goddess Saraswati, “We have noted the continuity of Hindu worship at the site, through regulated worship over time, which has never been extinguished." It also cancelled the 2003 Archaeological Survey of India (ASI) order which allowed Muslims to offer Friday prayers on Bhojshala premises. The court said that it drew on the 10 principles laid down by the Supreme Court in the 2019 Ayodhya case and the 2024 ASI survey.

== See also ==
- Islam in India
- List of mosques in India
- List of Monuments of National Importance in Madhya Pradesh/West
