= Bhojshala =

Hindu-Jain temple in Dhar, Madhya Pradesh, India (12th-century)

Bhojshala Temple
- भोजशाला मंदिर
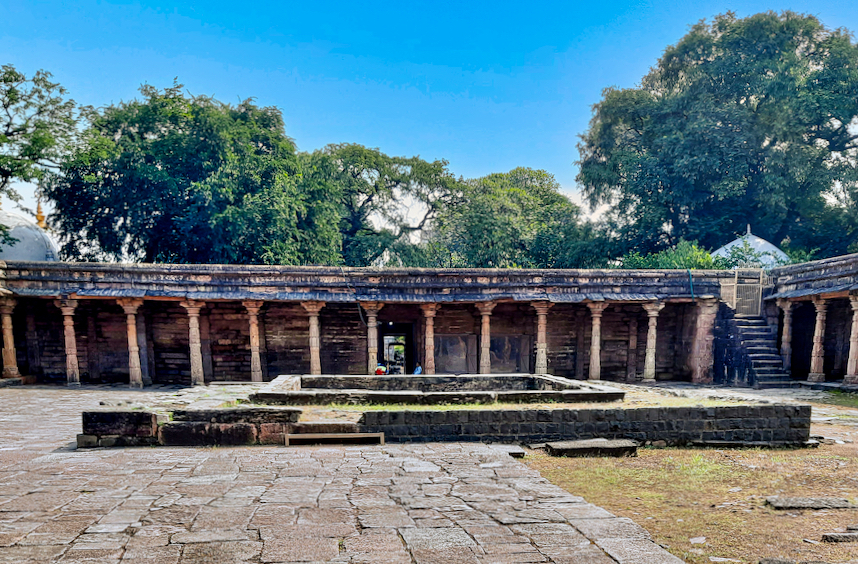
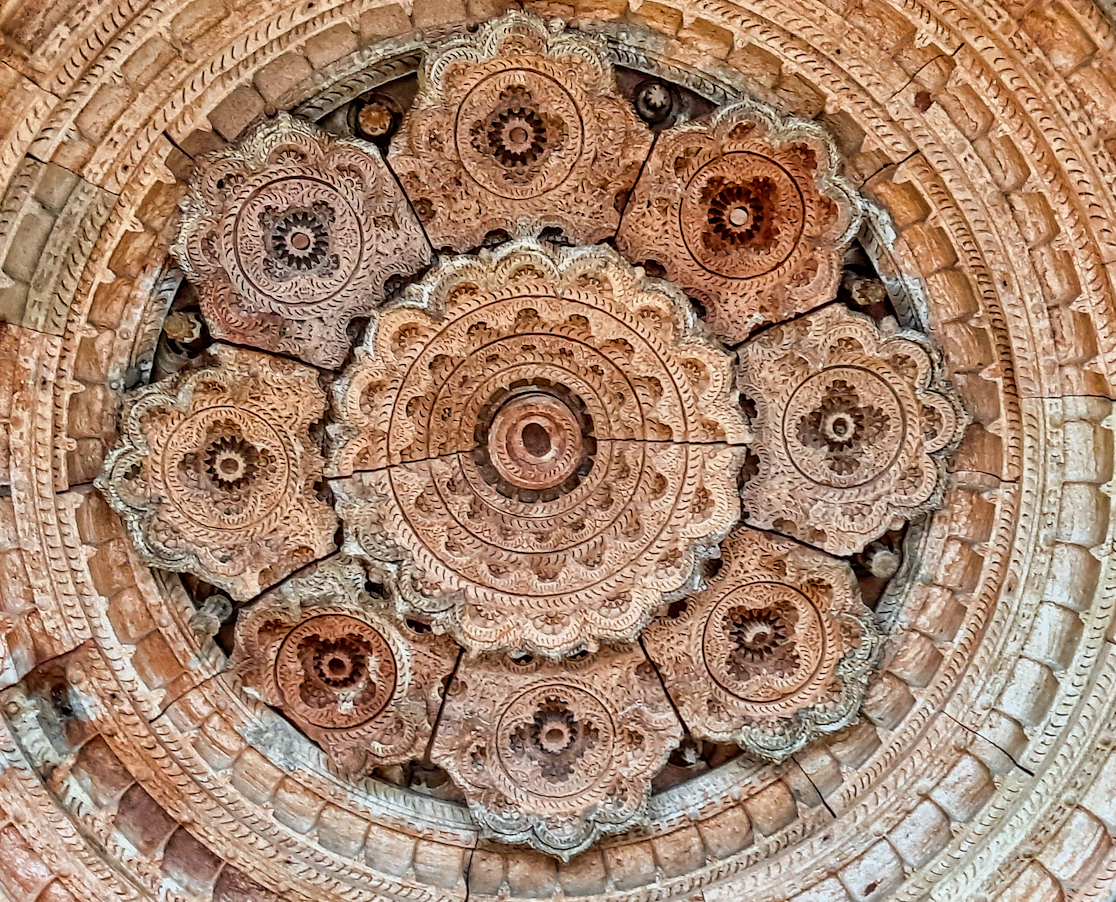
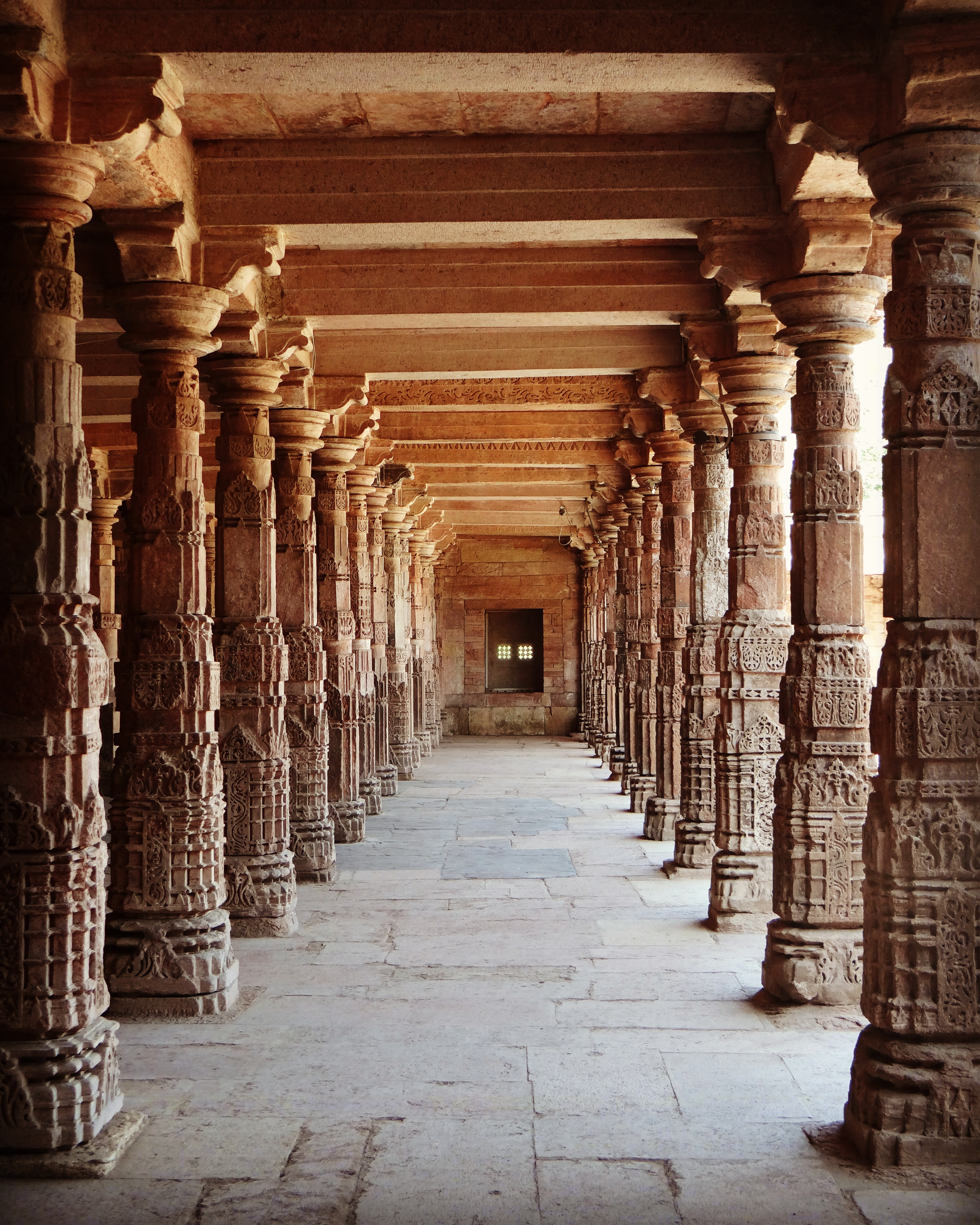
- Hindu Yagna site in Bhojshala Courtyard Temple lotus ceiling in Bhojshala Pillar arcade at Bhojshala

- Location in Madhya Pradesh

Religion
- Affiliation: Jain, Hindu
- Ecclesiastical or organisational status: School
- Status: Protected Monument

Location
- Location: Dhar, Madhya Pradesh
- Country: India
- Coordinates: 22°35′26″N 75°17′42″E

Architecture
- Type: School for Sanskrit and Prakrit
- Founder: Bhoja
- Completed: uncertain; rebuilt late 1300s

Monument of National Importance
- Official name: Bhoj Shala
- Reference no.: N-MP-117

Bhojshala Temple (IAST: Bhojaśālā, transl. "Hall of Bhoja") is a temple complex, located in Dhar, Madhya Pradesh, India, initially established during the reign of 11th century Paramāra king, Raja Bhoja, as a center of Sanskrit learning. In 1875, the British surveyed the complex, and an idol of deity Vagdevī (Jain Ambika Yakshini) was excavated. The courtyard includes a centrally located Hindu Yajna site. In 2026, the Madhya Pradesh High Court declared that Bhojshala was a Hindu temple complex dedicated to the Devi Saraswati, based on the archaeological survey, historical literature and architectural evidences (with a claim that Hindus and Jains are not distinct entities in India).

In 2024, a survey conducted by the Archaeological Survey of India uncovered many relics associated with Hindu iconography, including pillars and sculptures, indicating the presence of pre-existing temple architecture. Under the Parmara dynasty, Bhojshala complex is considered to have housed a large Sanskrit University, comparable to the ancient Nalanda mahavihara and Taxila University. It was a center of learning which included spiritual disciplines, as evidenced by a large assembly hall with a Yajna sacred fire pit (haven kund) in the courtyard, surrounded by pillars carved with deities and Sanskrit inscriptions.

The monument was repaired in the 18th century by the Pawar rulers of the Dhar Maratha State and, more extensively, by ASI after 1947. According to some historians, the architectural parts of the building proper are of different periods but mainly date to the twelfth and thirteenth centuries; the Islamic domed tombs in the wider campus were added between the fourteenth and fifteenth centuries.

Bhojshala is considered a monument of national importance in India and is open to visitors and tourists. The temple deity Vagdevi is also revered by Jains. Large number of Hindu and Jain devotees come regularly to the temple complex, with special celebrations on Vasant Panchami festival.

== Overview ==
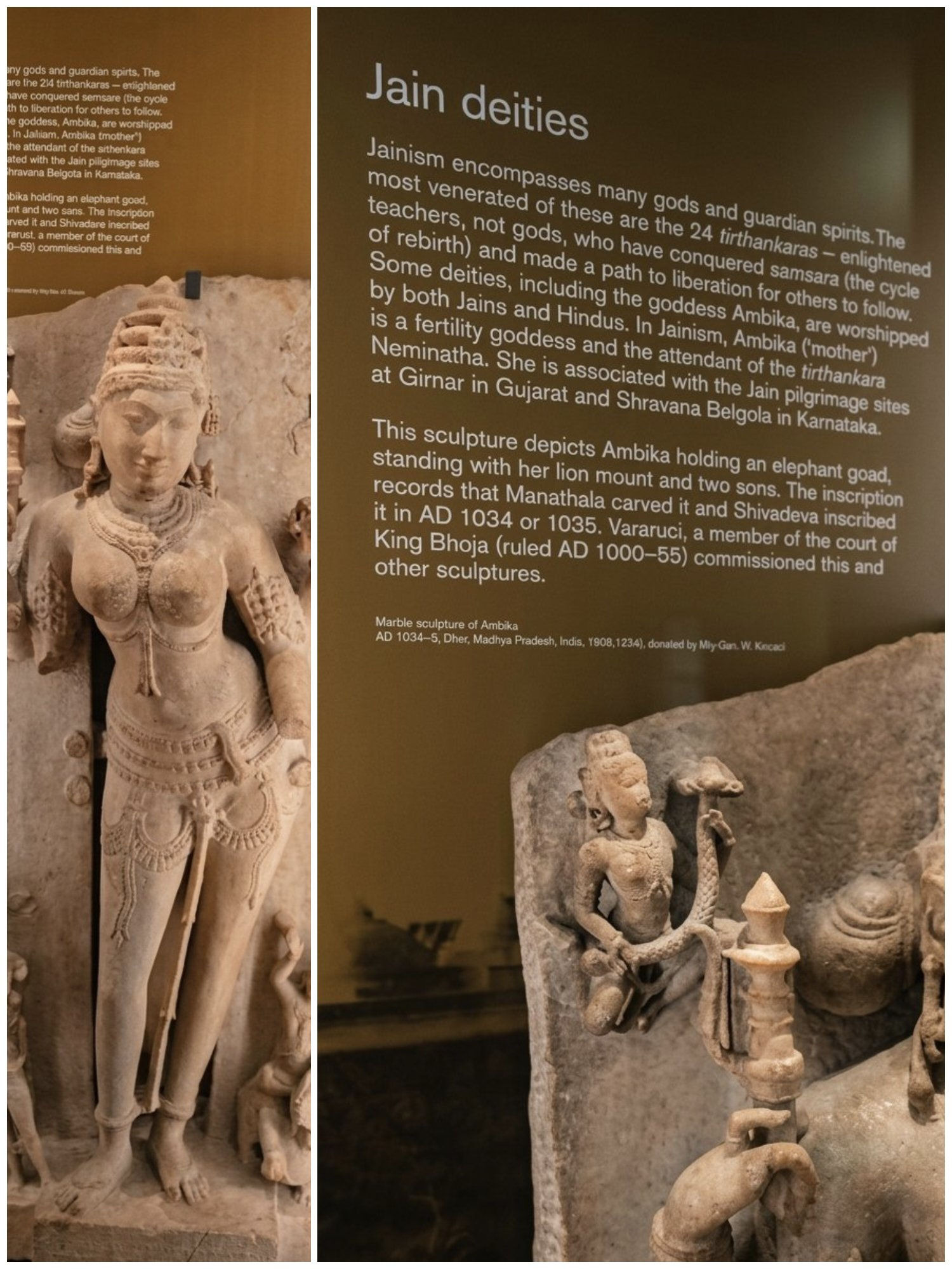
Museum Label and description of the Statue of Ambika Yakshi at British Museum in London

Bhojshala is a Monument of National Importance protected by the Archaeological Survey of India (ASI), under the Archaeological Sites and Remains Act, 1958. On May 15, 2026, the Madhya Pradesh High Court noted that the religious character of Bhojshala was that of a Hindu temple, as historical records indicate that it was a "Center of Sanskrit learning”, and had a "temple dedicated to the goddess Saraswati” at the historical complex.

An idol of the deity Ambika Yakshini (Goddess Saraswati), also considered the attendant deity of 22nd Jain Tirthankar Neminath, was excavated under the British in 1875 from the greater Bhojshala complex area. Some historians claim that the Ambika idol was found in the city hall around the Bhojshala complex. An ASI survey of the complex in 2024 revealed sculptures and iconography linked to Jainism and Hinduism, and unearthed artifacts included Jain Tirthankara-linked iconography as well as idols of Hindu deities like Ganesha, Brahma, Narasimha, Hanuman, Saraswati, and Krishna.

Previously, Hindus, Jains, and Muslims claimed the site and used it for their prayers, and according to ASI guidelines in 2003, Hindus and Jains were permitted to offer prayers every Tuesday, while Muslims could pray there every Friday. The site is also open to visitors and tourists. In 2024, noted archaeologist KK Muhammed, formerly associated with ASI, claimed that the Bhojshala complex was originally a Saraswati temple and that there were later attempts to convert it into an Islamic place of worship.

The Bhojshala temple complex is considered to have been built in the 11th century during the reign of Raja Bhoj, and several officials of British India in the early 1900's recorded that the Kamal Maula mosque stood on an occupied site of the Bhojshala complex.

== Emergence of current terminology ==
While Bhoja has long been linked to the complex, the term Bhojshala became associated with the building only in 1903, due to the efforts of K. K. Lele, the Superintendent of State Education and head of the archaeology department in Dhar State. He based the name on the poetic inscriptions and incised geometric drawings found at the site. Eugen Hultzsch, in his publication of the Dhār inscription of Arjunavarman in Epigraphia Indica of 1905-06, referred to a paper sent to him by Lele that described the discovery of the Sanskrit and Prakrit inscriptions at the 'Bhoja Shala'. The use was established at that point. A copy of Lele's 1903 paper was secured by S. K. Dikshit, who printed it in his study and translation of Pārijātamañjarī. Captain E. Barnes, writing in 1904, reported only that the mosque was "known among the Hindoo (sic.) population as 'Raja Bhoja ka Madrassa', i.e. Raja Bhoja's school." C. E. Luard in his Gazetteer of 1908 also called it Raja Bhoja's school. By the 1930s, the term Bhojshala was established, with rulings issued by Dhar State referring to it under this rubric.

William Kincaid, in his "Rambles among Ruins in Central India," published in the Indian Antiquary in 1888 mentions a number of local legends about Bhoja and his public works. Kincaid lived in Malwa for two decades and had significant antiquarian interests. The absence of the term Bhojshala in his writing indicates there was "no living tradition about the Bhojśālā in the middle decades of the nineteenth century." Several decades before Kincaid, John Malcolm visited Dhār and reports collecting an inscription there, but he, like other nineteenth century writers, does not use the term Bhojshala.

== Exploration and inscriptions ==
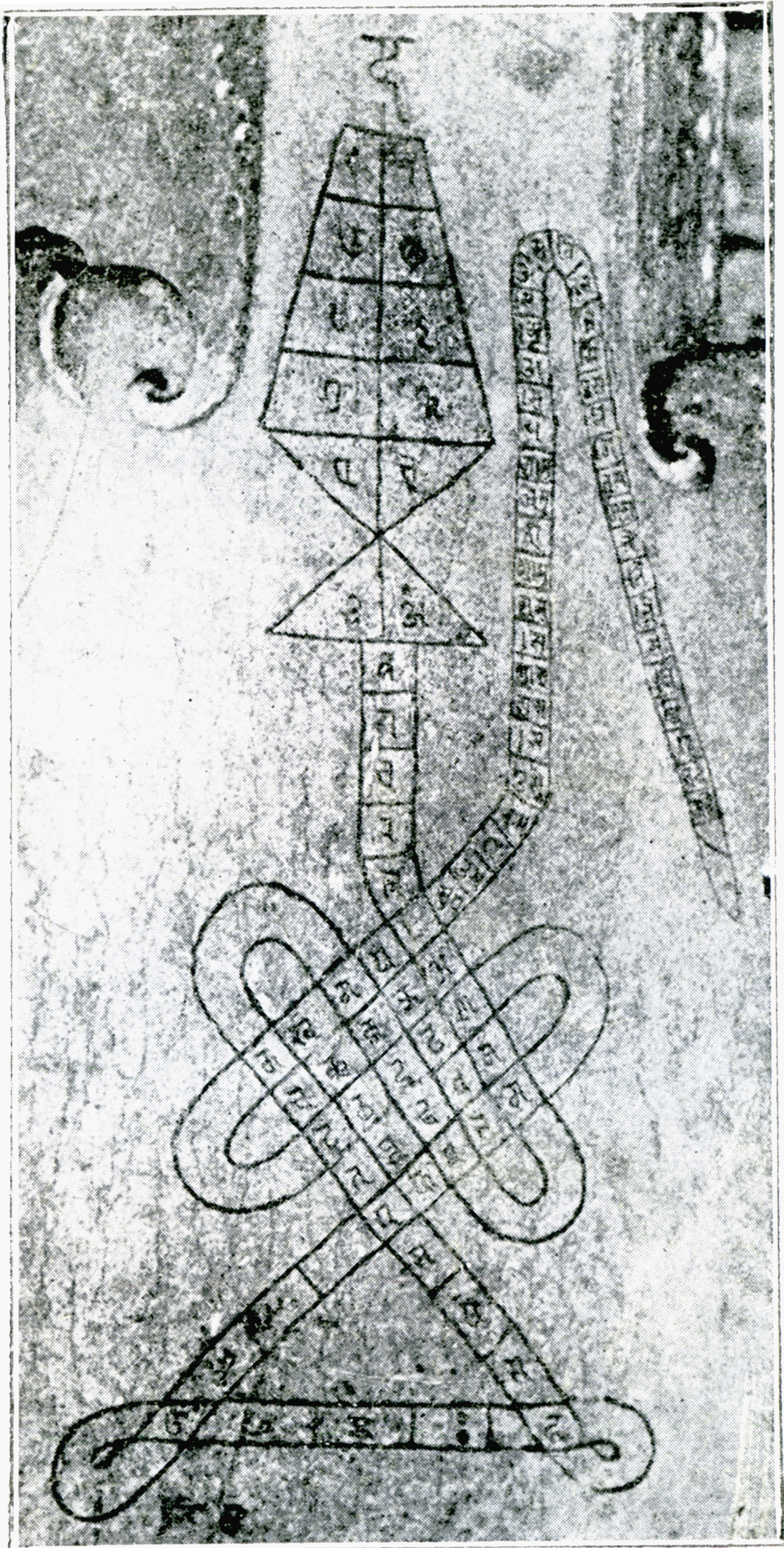
Dhār (Madhya Pradesh). One of the serpentine inscriptions noted by K. K. Lele at Kamāl Maula giving the phonology of the Sanskrit language in the form of talismanic snake and sword. This is engraved on a pillar to the right of the minbar in the building.

The archaeological sites at Dhār, especially the inscriptions, attracted the early attention of colonial Indologists, historians and administrators. Malcolm mentioned Dhār in 1822, along with building projects such as the dams planned and completed by King Bhoja. The scholarly study on the inscriptions of Bhojśālā continued in the late nineteenth century with the efforts of Bhau Daji in 1871. A fresh page was turned in 1903 when K. K. Lele, Superintendent of Education in the Princely State of Dhār, reported a number of Sanskrit and Prakrit inscriptions in the walls and floor of the pillared hall at Kamāl Maula. Study of the inscriptions has been continued by various scholars to the present. The variety and size of the inscriptions at the site, among them two serpentine records giving grammatical rules of the Sanskrit language from the time of Naravarman, show that materials were brought from a wide area and a number of different structures. In 2024, the Archaeological Survey of India undertook comprehensive documentation of the site, with one volume of the report providing a census of the inscriptions.

=== Rāüla vela of Roḍa ===
Malcolm mentioned that he removed an inscribed panel from the minbar of the Kamāl Maula. This is the inscription now identified as the Rāüla vela of Roḍa, a unique poetic work in the earliest forms of Hindi. This inscription was kept first in The Asiatic Society of Mumbai and was later transferred to the Chhatrapati Shivaji Maharaj Vastu Sangrahalaya in Mumbai.

=== The Kūrmaśataka ===
Among the inscriptions found by K. K. Lele was a tablet with a series of verses in Prakrit praising Kūrma. This is not the well-known Kūrma incarnation of the god Viṣṇu, but rather the primal tortise or Ādikūrma. The Kūrmaśataka is attributed to king Bhoja but the palaeography of the record itself suggests that this copy was engraved in the thirteenth century, probably in the time of Arjunavarman. The text was published by Richard Pischel in 1905–06, with a new version and translation appearing in 2003 by V. M. Kulkarni. The inscription is currently on display inside the building.

=== The Vijayaśrīnāṭikā ===
Another inscription found by K. K. Lele in 1903 is part of a drama called Vijayaśrīnāṭikā composed by Madana. The preceptor of king Arjunavarman, Madana bore the title 'Bālasarasvatī'. The inscription opens with an invocation to Śiva and reports that the play was performed before Arjunavarman in the temple of Sarasvatī. This suggests that the inscription came from the site of a Sarasvatī temple. The play refers to the temple under various names -- Bhāratī bhavana, Śāradā sadman—and says that it was “the chief temple that adorned the eighty-four cross-roads of Dhar.” Old Dhār being laid out as a grid, the main temple would have stood at the centre. Only the first two acts of the play are preserved, the final acts would have been given in a second tablet that has not been located. The inscription is currently on display inside the building, just inside the entrance.

=== Grammatical inscriptions: Serpentine scimitars of Udayāditya and Naravarman ===
The building also contains two serpentine grammatical inscriptions. These records, which contain the system of Sanskrit phonology and grammar, prompted K. K. Lele to describe the building as the Bhojshala or Hall of Bhoja because king Bhoja was the author of a number of works on poetics and grammar, among them the Sarasvatīkaṇṭhābharaṇa or 'Necklace of Sarasvatī'. The colophon of the grammatical chart, however, is inscribed with the statement that it is the "unique magical sword belonging to kings Udayāditya and Naravarman, the worshippers of Śiva, for the preservation of language and society." The earliest date that can be assigned to these records is thus the period of Naravarman, a Paramāra king who ruled circa 1094–1133.

=== Kodaṇḍakāvya and Khaḍgaśata ===
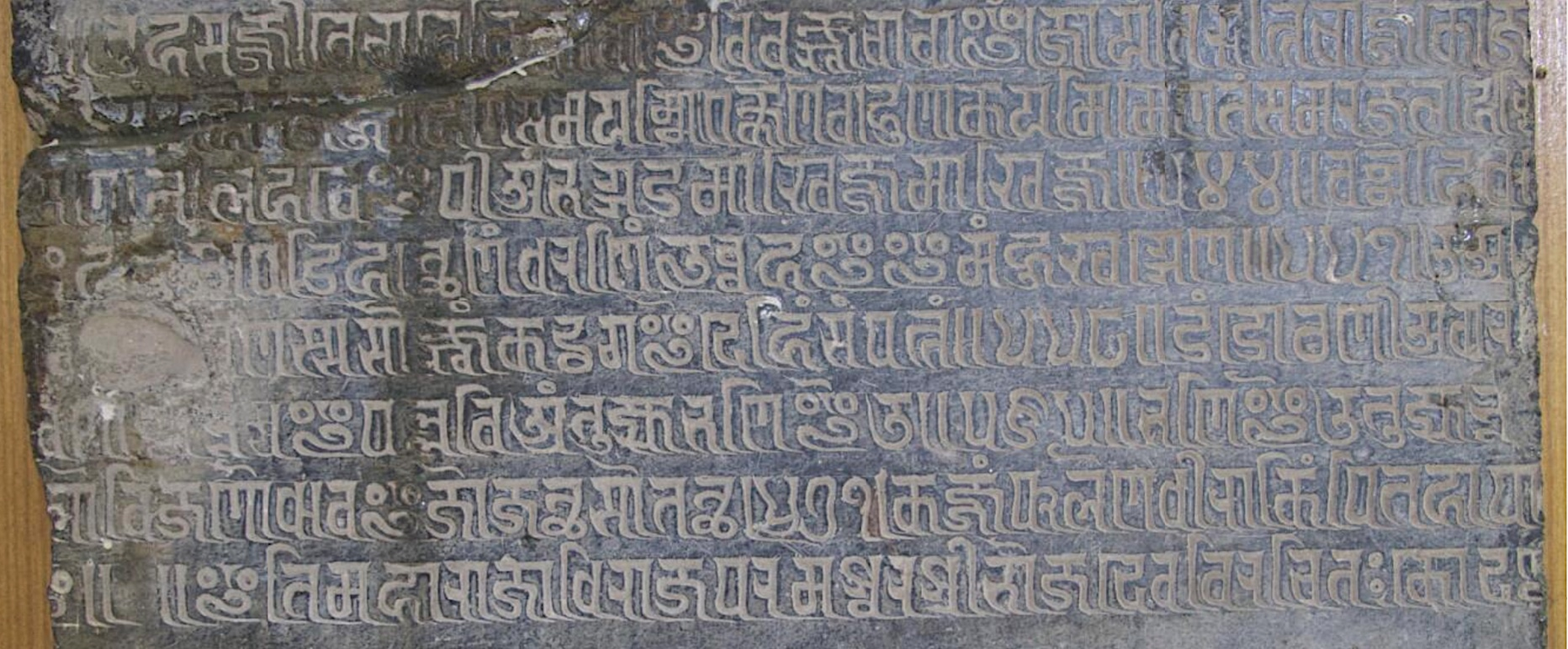
Dhār (Madhya Pradesh). Closing line of the Kodaṇḍakāvya inscription, naming king Bhoja and the text.

The fragments of two poems in Prakrit were removed from the Kamāl Maula campus to the Dhar Museum, Dhar Fort by the archaeological department of Dhar State and are still on display there. One poem is devoted the sword (Skt. khaḍga), the other to the bow (Skt kodaṇḍa), presumably that of Arjuna or Rāma. The texts open with the invocation oṃ namaḥ śivāya. The closing line of the Kodaṇḍakāvya, turning from Prakrit to simple Sanskrit, names the work and ascribes it to Bhoja. The writing style, however, is of the early thirteenth century from the reign of Arjunavarman.

== Shifting of Pillars to the Bhojshala in 2004 ==
At the end January 2004, the Archaeological Survey of India shifted two carved pillar to the building, placing them behind a protective grill in the south arcade. This caused consternation in the local community and prompted calls for the pillars to be removed to a museum as their presence distorted the historical character of the building. The calls were not heeded and the pillars remained in the building at the time of the Survey's 2024 census.

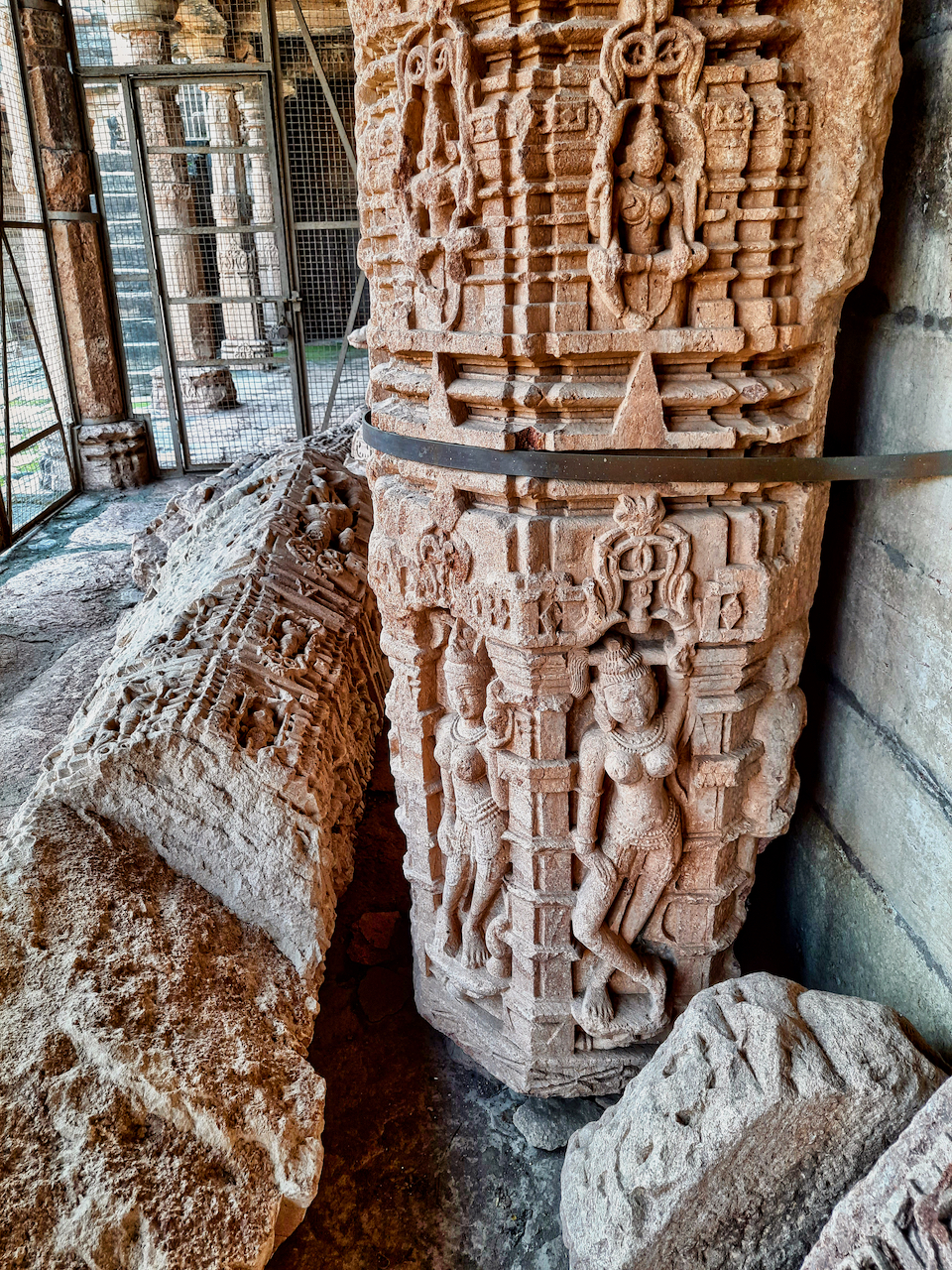
Dhār (Madhya Pradesh). Pillars shifted to the building in 2004 and now placed behind a protective grill in the south arcade.

== Rāja Bhoja ==
Rāja Bhoja, who ruled between circa 1000 and 1055 CE in central India, is considered one of the greatest kings in the Indian tradition. He was a celebrated author and patron of the arts and out of reverence to his memory a large number of Sanskrit works on philosophy, astronomy, grammar medicine, yoga, architecture and other subjects are attributed to him. Of these, a well studied and influential text in the field of poetics is the Śṛṅgara Prakāśa. Likely one of Bhoja's actual and original works, the core premise of the text is that Sringara is the fundamental and motivating impulse in the universe.

Along with his literary and art support, Bhoja began constructing a Shiva temple at Bhojpur. If it had been completed to the extent planned, the temple would have been double the size of the temples at the Khajuraho Group of Monuments. The temple was apparently abandoned at the king's death in about 1055. Kirit Mankodi has suggested that it was intended as Bhoja's funerary monument. That building activity was taking place at Bhojpur in Bhoja's time is shown by a dated inscription in the neighbouring Jain temple. The designs and rock-cut line drawings for the construction are discussed in a volume by Adam Hardy.

One of Bhoja's successors was king Arjunavarman (circa 1210-15). He and others in the Hindu and Jain traditions held Bhoja in such high regard that they stated they were Bhoja's reincarnation or were described by others as such. Centuries later, Bhoja remained a revered figure as evidenced by Merutuṅga's Prabandhacintāmaṇi, completed in Gujarat in the early fourteenth century, and Ballāla's Bhojaprabandha composed at Varanasi in the 17th century.

Raja Bhoj, a learned scholar, was considered a master of 72 arts and 36 branches of weaponry, and Dhar's Bhojshala complex was established as a grand residential Sanskrit university, comparable to Nalanda and Takshashila, which included a large assembly hall with a Hindu Yajna havan kund (sacred fire pit) at its center, and hundreds of carved pillars with sculptures of deities.

== Rāja Bhoja's Sarasvatī ==
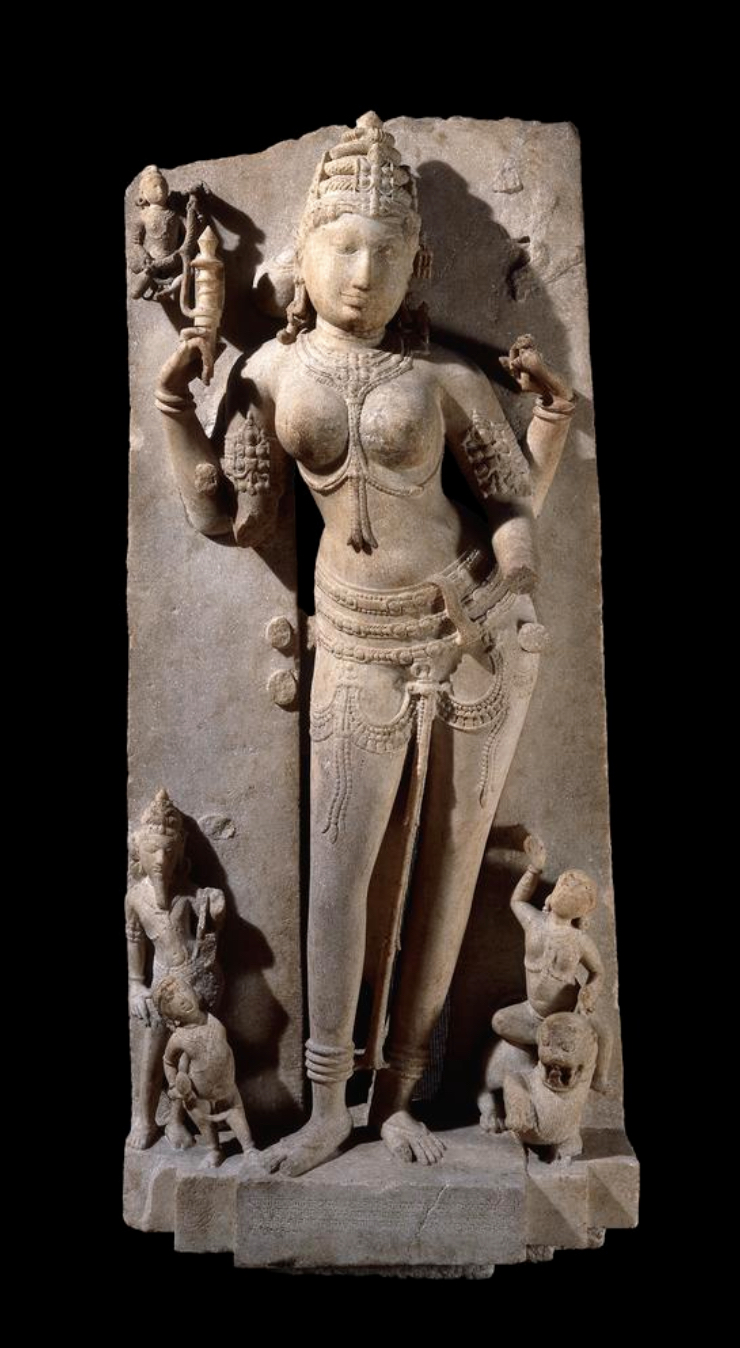
Idol of Ambikā Yakṣiṇī, attendant deity of 22nd Jain Tīrthankara Neminath, currently at British Museum in London. The sculpture with Jain inscription below was found at the City Palace, Dhār, in 1875 when the palace was being rebuilt.

In 1924, some two decades after Lele identified the Bhojaśālā with the Kamāl Maula, O. C. Gangoly and K. N. Dikshit published an inscribed sculpture in the British Museum, announcing that it was Rāja Bhoja's Sarasvatī from Dhār. This analysis was broadly accepted and had a significant impact. The statue in the British Museum was often misidentified as Bhoja's Sarasvatī in the years that followed. Also generally ignored is the fact that in 1944 C. B. Lele had reported that the sculpture was discovered at the site of the present city palace when that building was being reconstructed in 1875.

The inscription on the sculpture mentions king Bhoja and Vāgdevī, another name for Sarasvatī. The word 'Vāgdevī' literally means the goddess of speech, articulation and learning. However, later study of the inscription by Indian scholars of Sanskrit and Prakrit languages, notably Harivallabh Bhayani, demonstrated that inscription records the making of a sculpture of Ambikā after the making of three Jinas (Jain Tirthankars) and Vāgdevī. In other words, although Vāgdevī is mentioned, the inscription's main purpose is to record the making of an image of Ambikā, i.e. the sculpture on which the record is incised.

=== Ambikā inscription: translation ===
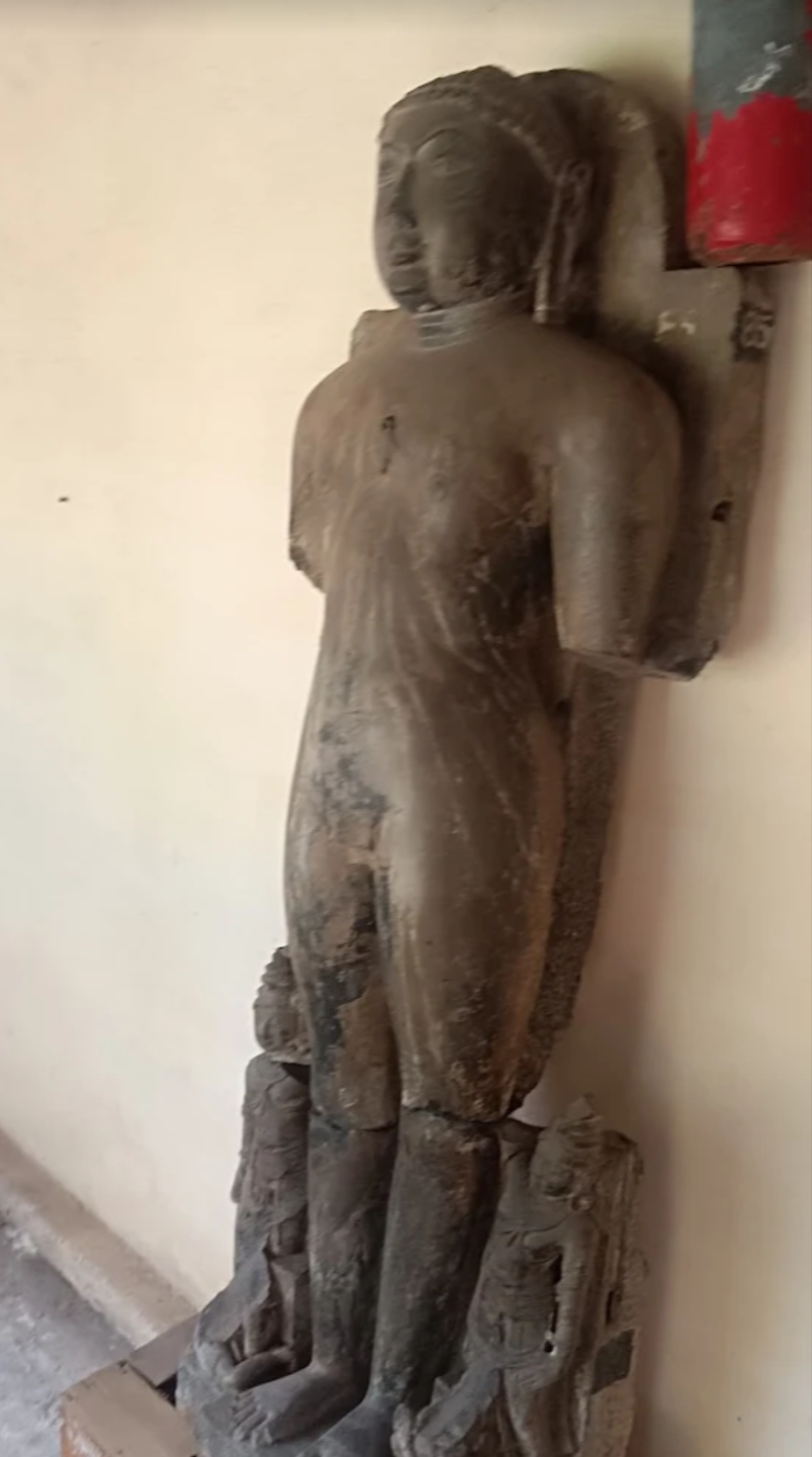
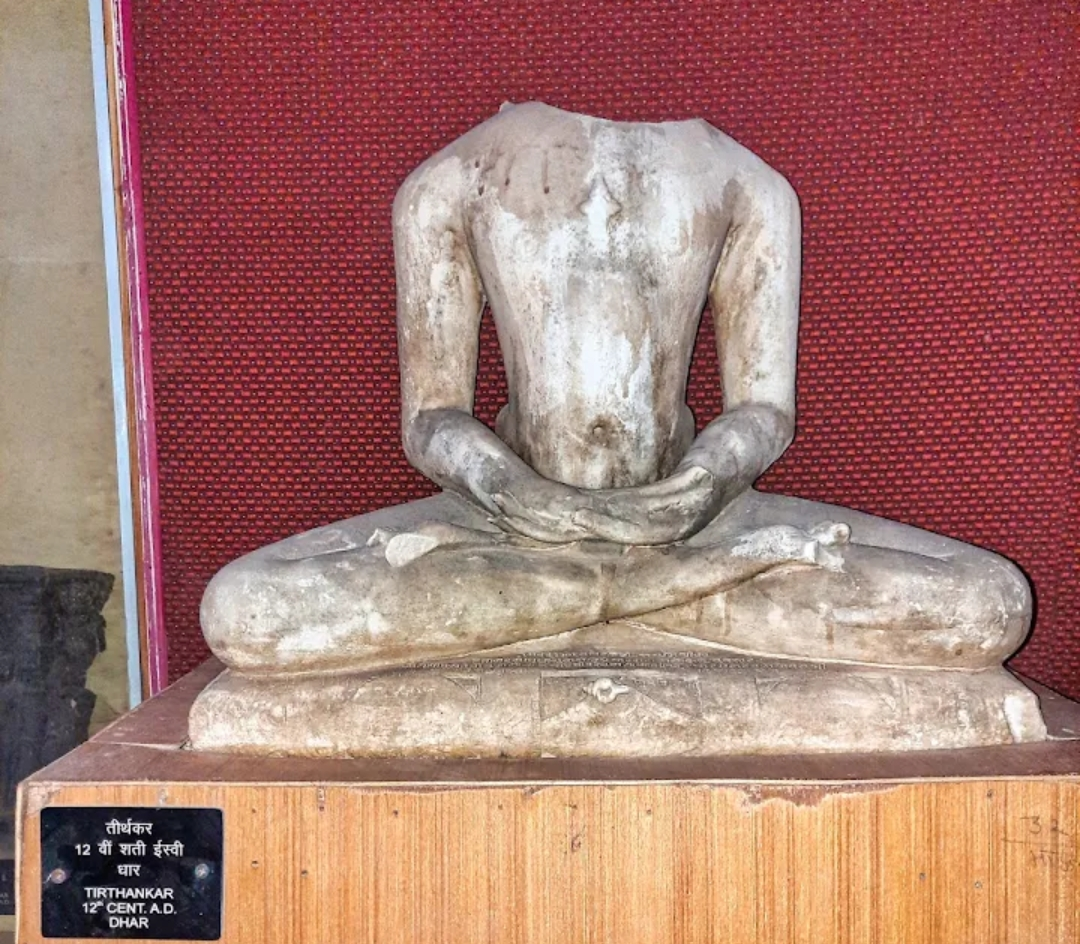
Jain Tirthankar idols from 11th-12th century unearthed in Dhar, at Dhar museum

The translation is given here for ready reference. For the Sanskrit text and further analysis, see Ambika Statue from Dhar.

The lady Sosā by name, whose religious intention is fixed upon the Vidyādharī Jain lineage in the city of the illustrious Bhoja, a moon among kings, who is of good discipline and is indeed an apsara distributing happiness, she, having first installed Vāgdevī the Mother and subsequently a triad of Jinas, created this auspicious image of Ambā who is radiant in beauty and grants fruit eternal. Blessings! It was fashioned by Maṇathala, son of the craftsman (sūtradhāra) Sahira. It was written by the artisan (vijñānin) Śivadeva. Year CE 1034-35. .

=== Iconography ===
The identification of the British Museum sculpture as Ambikā is confirmed by the iconographic features which conform to Ambikā images found elsewhere. A particularly close comparative example is the Ambikā in Sehore dating to the eleventh century. Like the Dhār sculpture, the Sehore image shows a youth riding a lion at the foot of the goddess and a figure with a beard standing at one side.

=== Present location of Sarasvatī ===
The inscription on the Ambikā statue shows that the Vāgdevī at Dhār was dedicated to the Jain form of Sarasvatī. However, the Vāgdevī mentioned is yet to be located or no longer exists. Merutunga, writing in the early fourteenth century, reports that Dhanapāla, the eminent Jain author, showed Bhoja eulogistic tablets in the Sarasvatī temple that were engraved with his poem dedicated to the first Jain Tīrthaṃkara Adinātha. While the poem, the Ṛṣbhapañcāśikā, has been preserved, the tablets, like the image, have not been located.

The Chaulukya and Vaghela dynasties took an aggressive attitude toward Dhār, sacking the city repeatedly in the dying days of the Paramāra regime. They removed libraries to western India where Paramara texts were copied and preserved, the Jain scripture Ṛṣbhapañcāśikā among them. An inscription of Vīsaladeva from Kodinar dated 1271 records the creation of a pleasure garden (ketana) and college (sadas) sacred to Sarasvatī, suggesting that in addition to texts, the kings of Gujarat also removed the sacred image of Sarasvatī and built a new temple for her, not far from Somanath. It is well documented that Hindu sacred places have moved, a notable case being the image of Rām that was found in Ayodhya and is now in Orchha. The goddess Sila Devī in Amber Fort was likewise brought from eastern India to Rajasthan, and the shifting of sacred images is found in Jainism. The practice has deep routes in India, going back to at least the fifth century.

== Legal case ==
Claims about the nature and history of the building have been ongoing since the early part of the twentieth century, with the authorities of Dhar State issuing rulings prior to Independence. However, legal challenges to the status quo have been mounted periodically, including a March 2024 writ to the Indore Bench of the Madhya Pradesh High Court. The court claimed that "The detailed arguments at the Bar by all the contesting parties fortify the court's belief and assumption that the nature and character of the whole monument admittedly maintained by the Central government needs to be demystified and freed from the shackles of confusion." The decision was upheld by the Supreme Court of India. In 2024, the Archaeological Survey of India undertook a detailed survey and assessment as a result of the court order; its report, in ten volumes, was released.

The ASI survey in 2024 recovered over 1,700 relics, including pillars, pilasters, and elements suggestive of pre-existing temple architecture associated with Hindu iconography. In 2024, an ASI survey, conducted over 98 days under the direction of the Madhya Pradesh High Court, collected evidence through excavation and architectural analysis and concluded that the existing structure incorporates parts of an earlier monumental complex from the Paramara dynasty, roughly the 11th century. Further, ASI investigations revealed that the building referred to as the Kamal Maula Mosque was constructed "centuries later". Advocate Vishnu Shankar Jain, representing the Hindu side in court, argued that since the ASI survey revealed statues of Hindu deities, Sanskrit inscriptions, and a Hindu Yajna (havan kund), a sacred fire place, therefore the Bhojshala complex was a temple in nature and could not be considered a mosque.

On 15 May 2026, the Indore bench of the Madhya Pradesh High Court, presided over by Justices Vijay Kumar Shukla and Alok Awasthi, declared the disputed Bhojshala Temple-Kamal Maula Mosque Complex in Dhar a temple dedicated to Goddess Saraswati, “We have noted the continuity of Hindu worship at the site, through regulated worship over time, which has never been extinguished." It also cancelled the 2003 Archaeological Survey of India (ASI) order which allowed Muslims to offer Friday prayers on Bhojshala premises. The court said that it drew on the 10 principles laid down by the Supreme Court in the 2019 Ayodhya case, along with the large number of evidences of Hindu iconography revealed in the ASI survey. In this case, the High Court states that it was determining “the character of the disputed area on the basis of historical literature, architectural features, ASI survey reports, etc.” and was not deciding the title of the property of the disputed area. The court held that the disputed area was notified as an ancient monument under the Ancient Monuments Preservation Act, 1904, and therefore disregarded an ailan (order) from 1935.

Some Jain experts have critiqued the High Court verdict, claiming that the idol is of the Jain goddess Ambika Yakshini and may be misrepresented as the Hindu Saraswati, given that it was made by a Jain sculptor, along with the idols of the Tirthankars. An archaeologist K.R. Srinivasan, had in 1975, postulated that some Jaina shrines in Tamil Nadu were converted into Shaiva or Vaishnava shrines in the 8th and 9th centuries. The court agreed that the idol may be a Jain goddess but claimed that in India, “Jainism and Hinduism are not distinct entities” and idols belonging to “both Jain and Hindu traditions are frequently found within each other’s temples”.

== See also ==
- Ambika Statue from Dhar
- Maihar the temple to Sarasvatī in eastern Madhya Pradesh.
- Sharada Peeth the temple to Sarasvatī in Kashmir
