= Dennis Kincaid =

British civil servant & novelist (1905-1937)

Dennis Kincaid (16 October 1905 – 10 June 1937) was a civil servant in British India, a novelist and the writer of Shivaji: The Grand Rebel, a widely respected account of the life of the sixteenth century self-made Emperor, and British social life in India, 1608-1937, a classic account of the British in colonial India.

Dennis Charles Alexander Kincaid was born on 16 October 1905, the elder son of Charles Augustus Kincaid. His father was a senior member of the Indian Civil Service, and was also a well-known novelist and historical writer. His grandfather was Major-General William Kincaid, the Resident of Bhopal. Kincaid studied at Balliol College, Oxford (1924–1927), then obtained a post with the Indian Civil Service. He arrived in Bombay in 1928, where he was assigned work with the courts. He wrote two novels about life in India. His Cactus Land (1934) was an unusual story, breaking with the conventions of Indian novels of that period. Kincaid drowned on 10 June 1937 while swimming in a rough sea. His work British social life in India, 1608-1937 was not quite complete at the time of his death, and was completed by his friend David Farrer. His treatment of Anglo-Indians in this book has been criticized as being an "over-the-top caricature".

== Bibliography ==
- Dennis Kincaid (1933). Durbar. Chatto And Windus.
- Dennis Kincaid (1934). Moonrise on the Indus. Harcourt, Brace and company.
- Dennis Kincaid (1934). Cactus land: a novel. Chatto & Windus.
- Dennis Kincaid (1938). British social life in India, 1608-1937. Routledge. ISBN 0-7100-7284-8.
- Kincaid, Dennis (1936). The Grand Rebel: An Impression of Shivaji, Founder of the Maratha Empire. Collins.
