= Charles Augustus Kincaid =

British colonial judge and historian (1870–1954)

Charles Augustus Kincaid, CVO (8 February 1870 – 15 August 1954) was a British administrator in India. A member of the Indian Civil Service, he was the son of Major-General William Kincaid, sometime Resident of Bhopal.

Kincaid was born in Indore, the son of General William Kincaid (1831–1909) and Martha Pattie Shortt. He went to Sherborne School and Balliol, before joining the Indian Civil Services in 1889. He served in Sind (1891–94), Satara (1896–98), Kathiawar (1905–7) and became n acting judge in Bombay in 1921. He retired from the Indian service in 1926 and became a Vice Consul at Cherbourg, later at St. Malo and Berne between 1927 and 1935. Kincaid co-authored with Dattatray Balwant Parasnis, the History of the Maratha People in three volumes. Higher in command requested that the book not be published because of its favorable portrayal of some Indian figures.

He married Katherine Mary Seddon (1873–1955) in 1904 and they had a daughter and three sons including Dennis Kincaid, who also became a civil servant, and author of two novels and the historical study British Social Life in India, 1608–1937.
