= Dattatray Balwant Parasnis =

Indian historian

Rao Bahadur Dattatray Balwant Parasnis
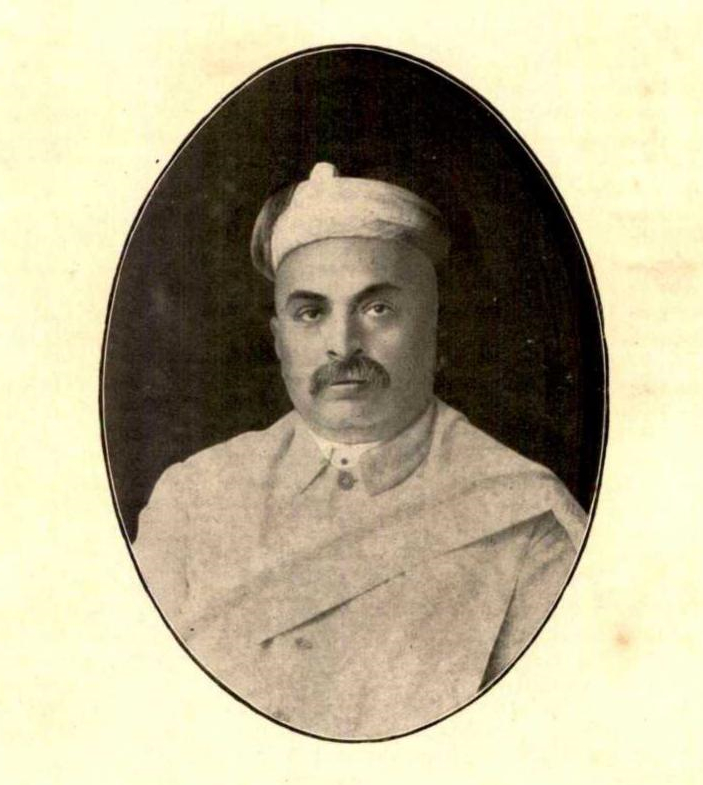
- Born: 27 November 1870; Satara, Bombay Presidency (now part of Maharashtra)
- Died: 31 March 1926; Poona, Bombay Presidency (now part of Maharashtra)
- Occupation: Historian
- Children: Amritrao Dattatray Parasnis, Pandurang Dattatray Parasnis, Shrikrishna Dattatray Parasnis, Raghunath Dattatray Parasnis, Govind Dattatray Parasnis, Krishnabai Kumathekar, Champutai Raghunath Deshapande

Dattatray Balwant Parasnis (27 November 1870 – 31 March 1926) was a historian from Maharashtra, India, who lived during the British Raj days.

Parasnis had been granted a lifelong pension of two hundred rupees a month by the Government of Bombay.

== Early life ==
Parasnis was born on 27 November 1870 in a traditional middle-class Deshastha Brahmin family.

== Work ==
Parasnis authored biographies of Bramhendra Swami, Rani's Laxmi Bai of Jhansi and Baija Bai of Gwalior and works on the Mahrattas and the Nawabs of Oudh.

Parasnis also published collections of letters in his two monthly magazines, the Bharatavarsha and the Ithihasa Sangraha, of which the first covered two years and the second seven years from August 1907.

In 1894, Parasnis published an authoritative biography of Maharani Jhansi Lakshmibai, Maharani Laxmibaisaheb Yanche Charitra. His book was based on interviews with Dhanodar Rao, adopted son of Rani Lakshmibai, who was still alive then.

In 1918–1925, along with Charles Augustus Kincaid, he co-authored in three volumes, A History of the Maratha people.

His Poona in Bygone Times was published in 1921.

== Honours ==
- In 1913, he was honoured with the title Rao Bahadur in recognition of his scholarship by the British Government.

== Biography and Work ==
- On Nov 27, 2022, which was his 152nd birthday, a book titled " Rao bahadur D.B.Parasnis - Charitra va Karya " written by Dr. Surendra Shrikrishna Parasnis was published.
