= K. K. Lele =

Indian civil servant and educator (died c. 1935)

Kaśināth Kṛṣṇa Lele, normally cited and referred to as K. K. Lele (d. circa 1935), was a civil servant in Dhar State, a Princely State in the Central India Agency of British India. Early in his career, in 1887, he took over the educational department in Dewas State, introducing reforms and opening a number of schools. In 1899, he shifted to Dhar State where he was appointed tutor to the Rājā of Dhār. He also served as Director of Education in Dhār State. In anticipation of the visit of Lord Curzon to Dhār in 1902, Captain Ernest Barnes, the political agent, formed an archaeological department and placed Lele in charge in September 1902.

Lele was a gifted scholar of Sanskrit and had particular interests in epigraphy, publishing a number of articles on the inscriptions in Dhār state. He was responsible for recovering the Kodaṇḍakāvya from the Kamāl Maula campus in Dhar and arranging the fragments in the museum in Dhār fort (now a museum under the jurisdiction of the Directorate of Archaeology, Museums and Archives, Madhya Pradesh). Much of his work on Paramara-period inscriptions was collected and published by his nephew, C. B. Lele. Of published work in his lifetime, the most wide-ranging was The Paramāras of Dhār and Mālwā, appended to the Dhār State Gazetteer but released only as a separate volume. He also co-authored History of Dhar State : Modern Period with S. K. Oak.

Lele's most significant discoveries were inscriptions in the Kamal Maula masjid: the Kūrmaśatakadvayam, two poems praising Kūrma in Prakrit and the Vijayaśrīnāṭikā, a drama by the poet Madana for his patron Arjunavarman (c. 1210-15). A concise and informative analysis of the dramatic inscription is given by H. V. Trivedi. Lele's views about the Vijayaśrīnāṭikā were circulated in a report dated 30 December 1903, subsequently printed and published in full by S. K. Dikshit in 1968. Because a number of the literary inscriptions found at Dhār had colophons attributing the works to Bhoja, Lele coined the term 'Bhojshālā' for the Kamāl Maula masjid, a building that was popularly known as Rājā Bhoja's madrasa in his time. The fact that Vijayaśrīnāṭikā opens with an invocation to Sarasvatī has prompted the idea that the Bhojshala was sacred to this goddess. Although this association cannot predate Lele's discovery of the Vijayaśrīnāṭikā in November 1903, it has led to social tensions and a legal case that reached the Madhya Pradesh High Court in 2024. Thus Lele's research and historical interpretations, conducted more than a century ago, continue to have significant implications.
