= Kodaṇḍakāvya =

Kodaṇḍakāvya is a poetic work in Prakrit ascribed to King Bhoja. The poem survives as a series of inscribed stone fragments preserved in the Dhār Museum, located in Dhar, Madhya Pradesh. It was first brought to public notice by N. P. Chakrabarti in 1934-35. Subsequently the text was read by Lele and the inscription listed in the Annual Report on Indian Epigraphy. The inscription was originally a long one and contained more that 572 stanzas. With the exception of the opening words oṃ namaḥ śivāya, and the colophon at the end, the whole record is in Arya metre. The language is Prakrit mixed with a few Apabhraṃśa forms. Although Bhoja died in the mid-eleventh century, the style of the script suggests this copy was made in the thirteenth century, probably in the time of Arjunavarman. The final line of the text, illustrated here, reads: ||°iti-mahārājādhirāja-paramēśvara-śrī-bhojadeva-viracitaḥ kōdaṇḍa [.....], as noted by Chakrabarti and Lele.

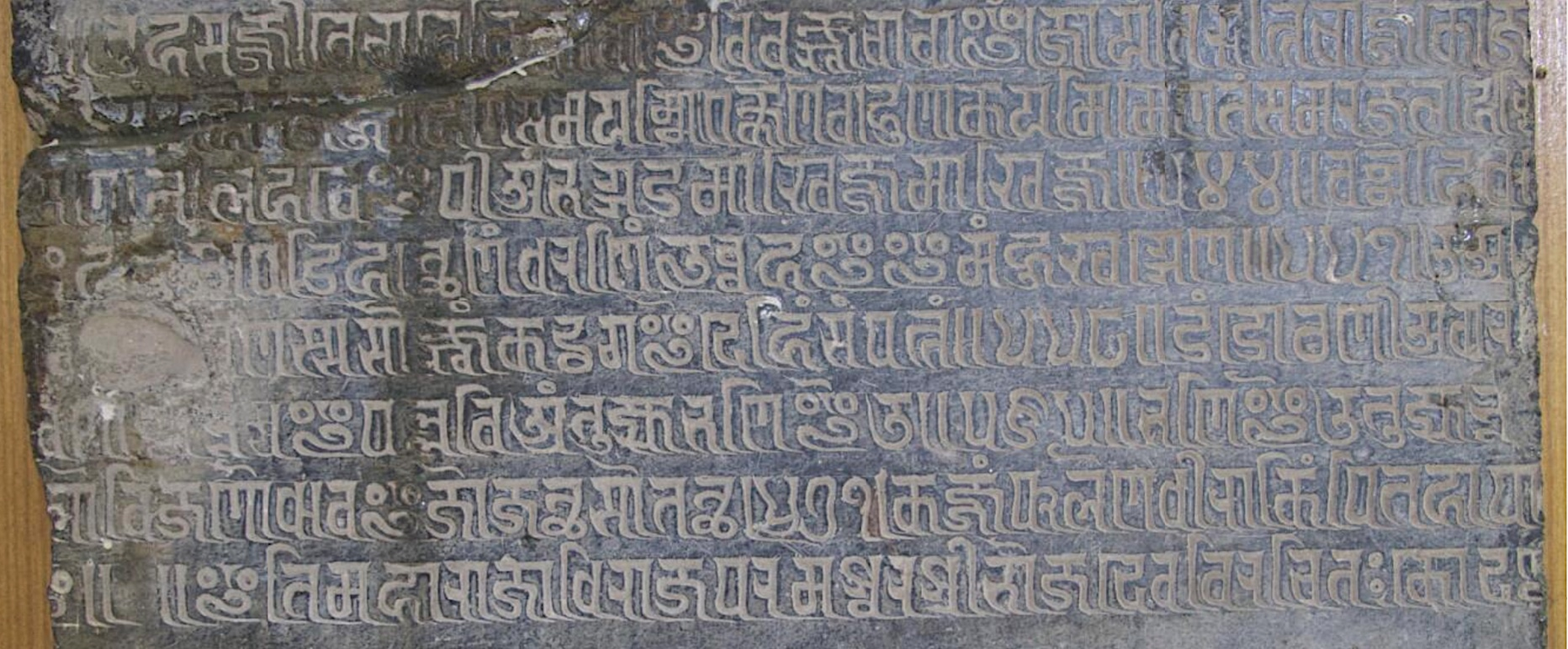
Dhār (Madhya Pradesh). Closing line of the Kodaṇḍakāvya inscription, naming king Bhoja and the text.

Although from Dhār, due to a error on the part of D. B. Diskalkar, the inscription is sometimes said to have been found at Mandu.
