= Rāüla vela of Roḍa =

Poetic work by the poet Roḍa

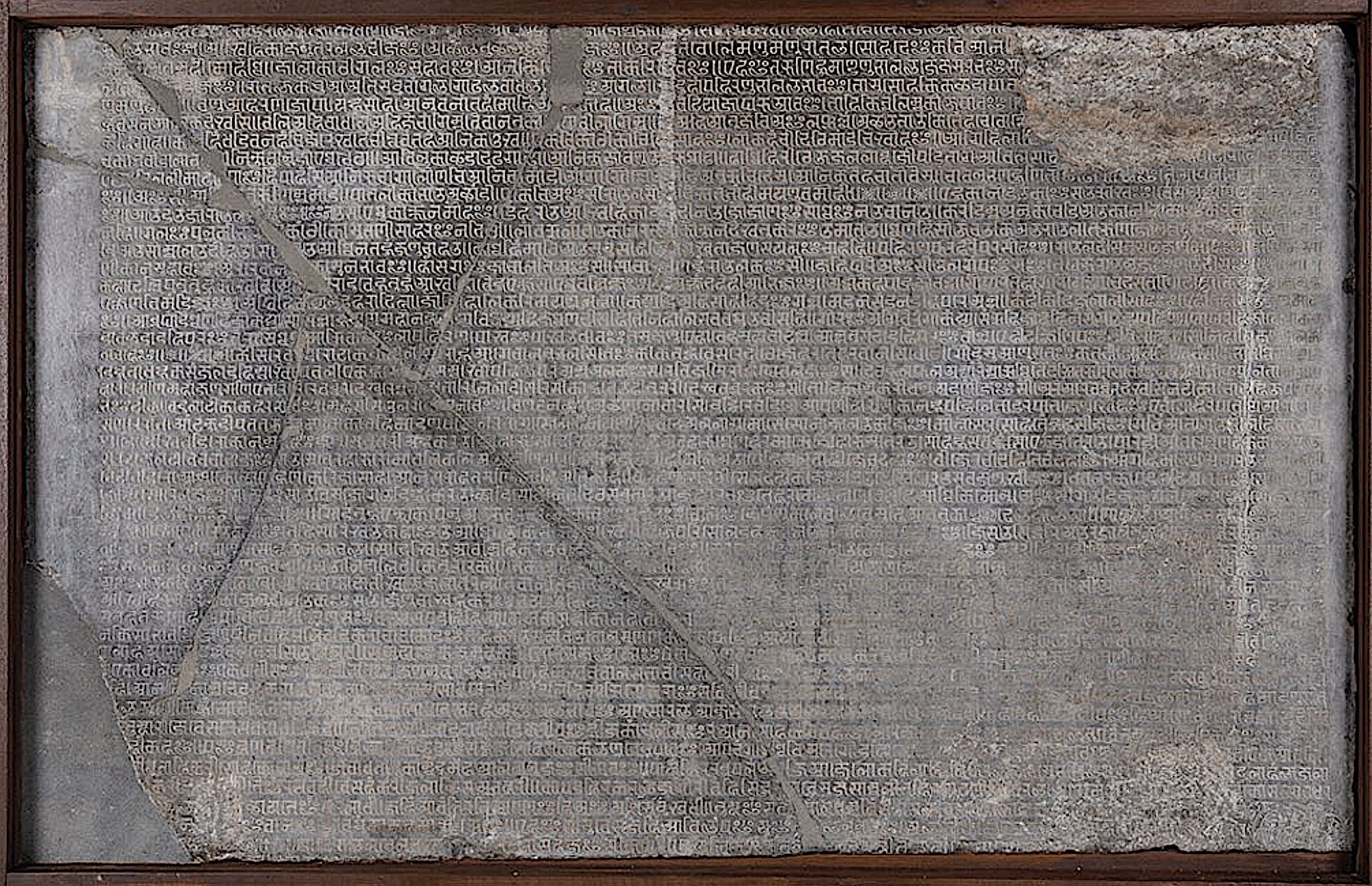
Dhār inscription of the Rāüla vela, a Prakrit poetic text by the poet Roḍa, late 12th or early 13th century, after conservation. Chhatrapati Shivaji Maharaj Vastu Sangrahalaya, Mumbai.

The Rāüla vela is a poetic work composed in the circa late twelfth century by the poet Roḍa. It is preserved in a unique inscription from Dhār, Madhya Pradesh, India, that is now kept in the Chhatrapati Shivaji Maharaj Vastu Sangrahalaya in Mumbai (number SI 9). The inscription was transferred to the museum from The Asiatic Society of Mumbai.

== Language ==
The language of the poem imitates the characteristics of various contemporary dialects, but the underlying dialect represents a transitional stage between Apabhraṃśa and the earliest forms of Hindi. The inscription is, therefore, of first importance for the linguistic history of northern India. The text the poem was studied in depth and translated by Harivallabh Bhayani. Detailed studies of the language were undertaken by Mātāprasāda Gupta and subsequently by Kailaś Candra Bhāṭiyā. A further study of the inscription was published by Timothy Lenz in 1999.

== Paleography ==
The palaeography of the record shows some similarity to the famous Dhār inscription of Arjunavarman (circa 1210–15) which takes the form of play called the Vijayaśrīnāṭikā.

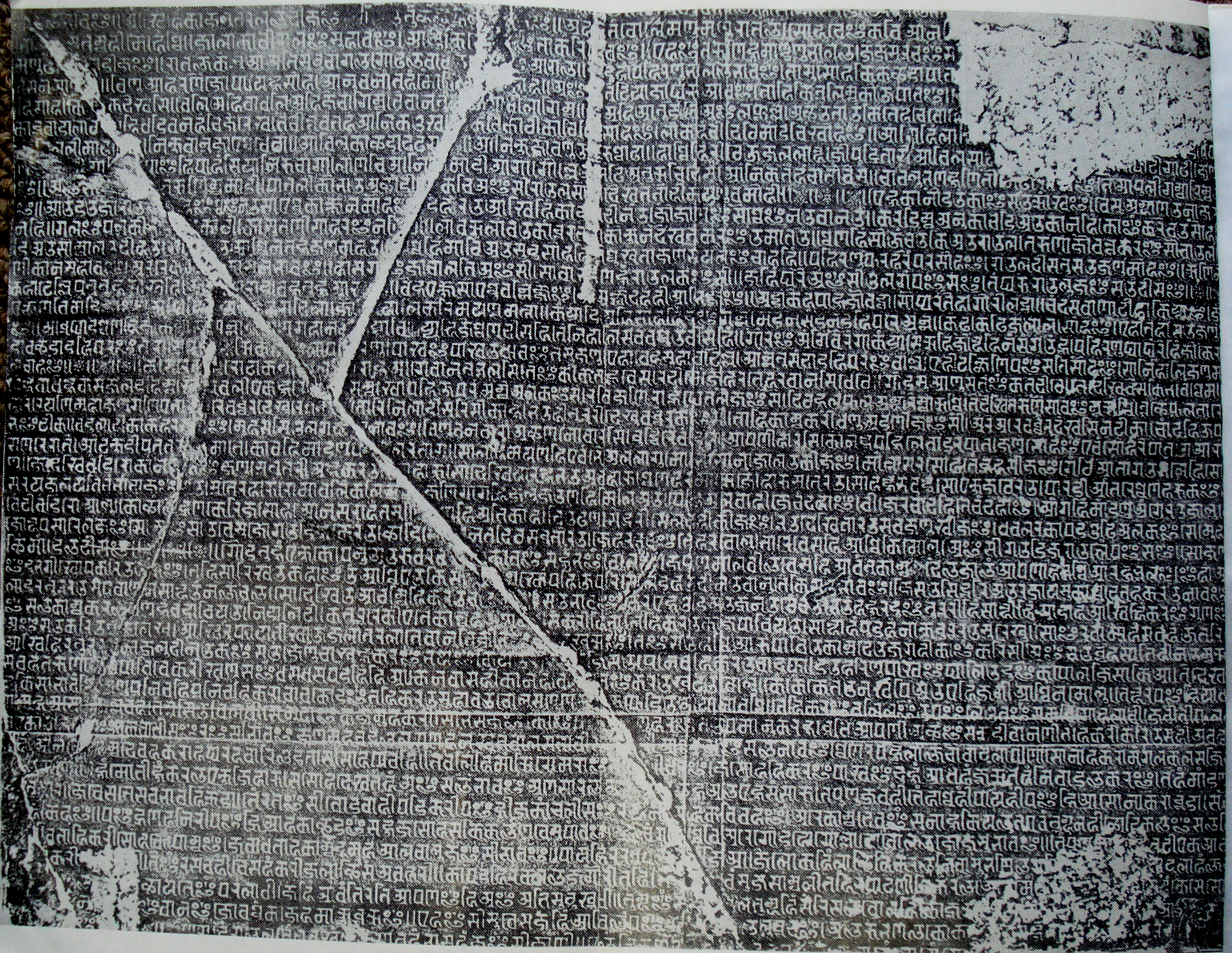
Dhār inscription of the Rāüla vela, a Prakrit poetic text by the poet Roḍa, late 12th or early 13th century. Estampage.

== Content and Genre ==
The Rāüla vela belongs to a poetic type known as Nakhaśikha, well known from Sanskrit, Prakrit and the later literary tradition. The aim of these works was to present a poetic description of the glory, charms and beauty of the Nāyaka or Nāyīkā, along with an account of their costume, coiffure and ornaments. The long history of the genre begins with the description of Umā in the Kumārasaṃbhava, and is elaborated in later languages, especially in the Vaiṣṇava tradition. The Rāüla vela is unique as the earliest Nakhaśikha in early new Indo-Aryan literature.
