= Ambika Statue from Dhar =

Marble Jain figure

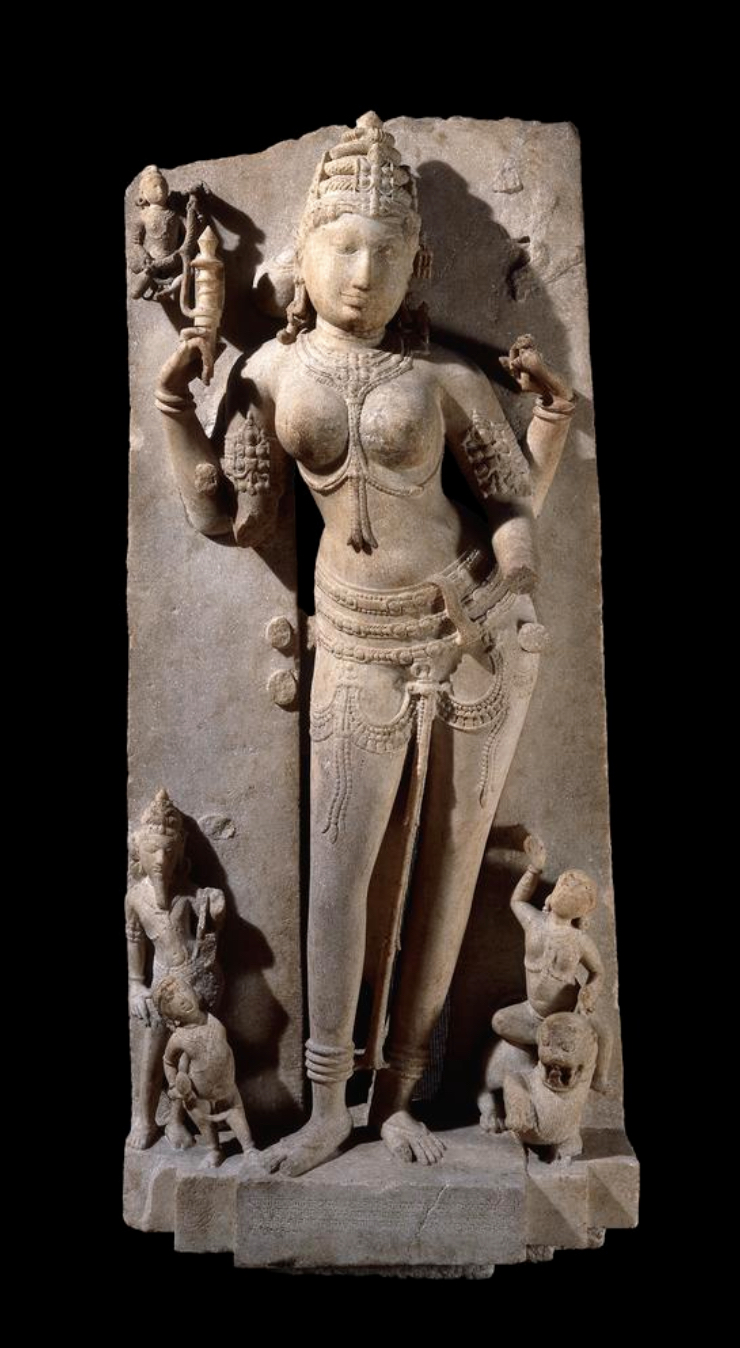
- Material: Marble
- Size: 1.28 metres High
- Weight: 250 kg
- Writing: Nāgarī
- Created: 1034 AD
- Present location: British Museum, London
- Registration: 1909,1224.1

The Ambikā Statue from Dhār is a marble figure in high relief of the Jain goddess Ambikā in the British Museum, London. The sculpture was discovered in the city of Dhār, central India, in the nineteenth century and is famous for its inscription in Sanskrit on the base that provides a link to the Paramara dynasty and the court of king Bhoja (c. 1010–1055). The Ambikā has been part of the British Museum's collection since 1909.

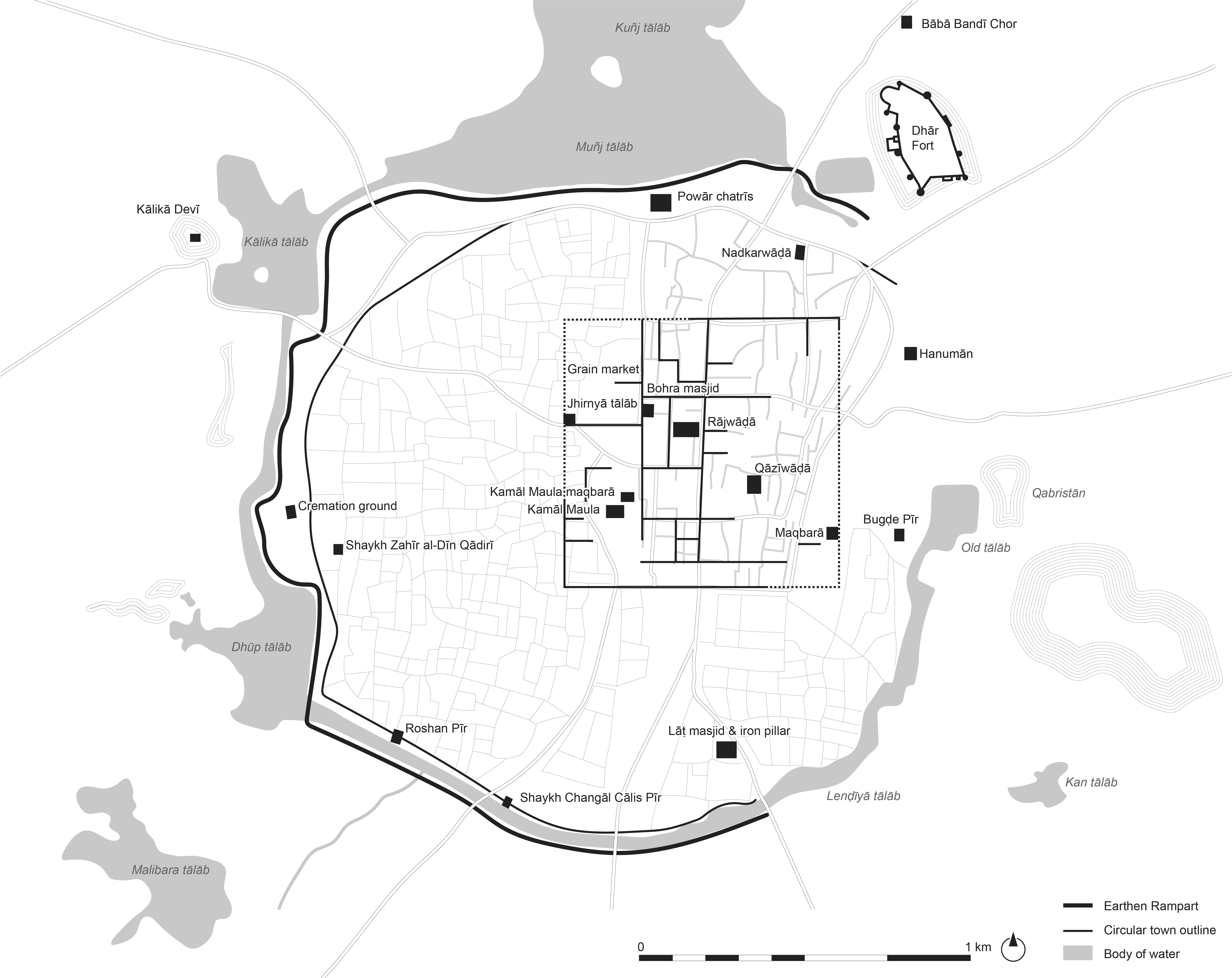
Dhār (Madhya Pradesh). Historic plan of Dhār showing location of the old city palace (Rājwāḍā), findspot of the Ambikā

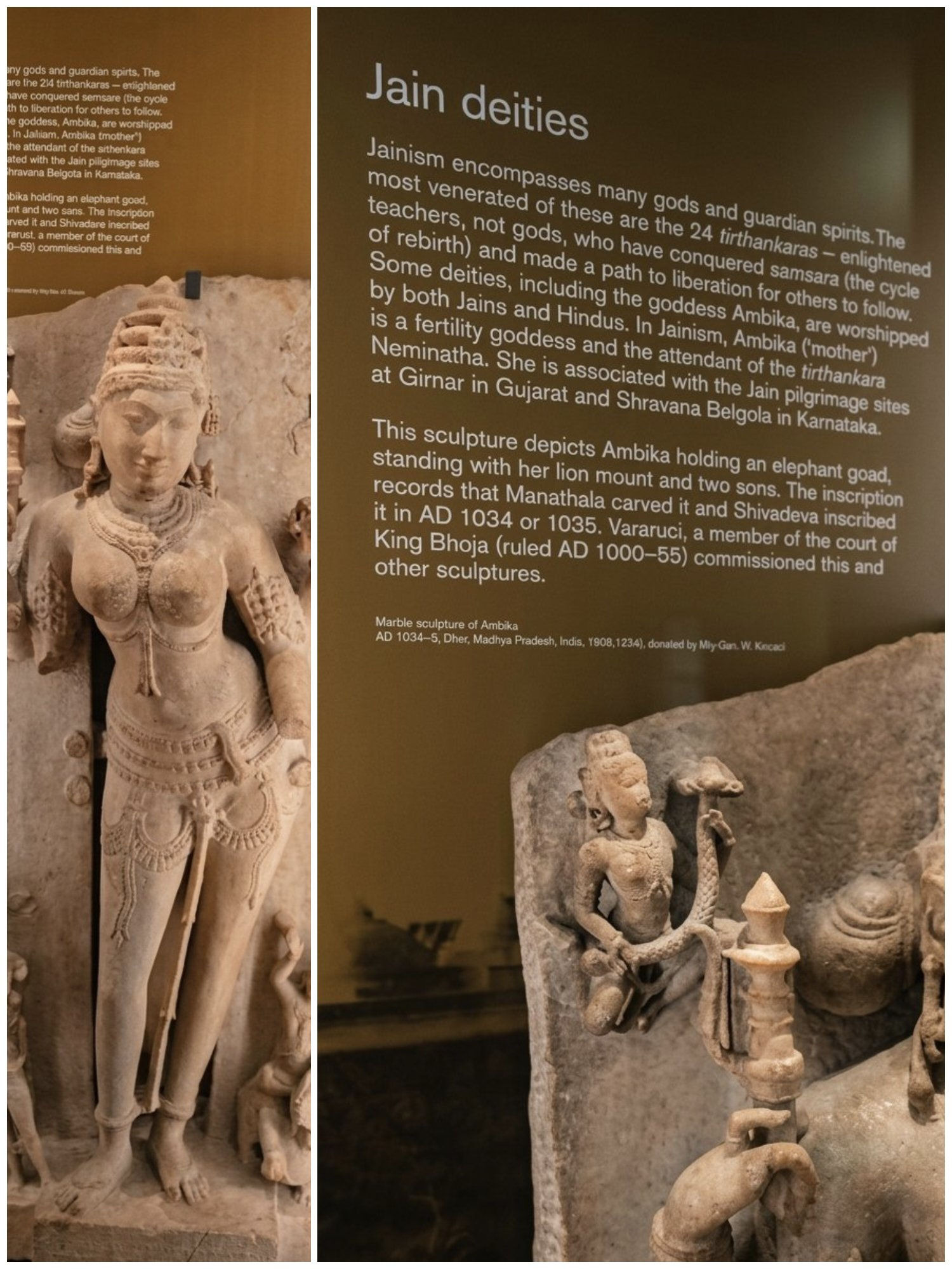
British Museum, London. The Ambikā with interpretation panel explaining Jainism and role of the yakṣiṇī Ambikā in Jain art and belief.

== Provenance ==
The statue was found on the site of the old city palace in Dhār, Madhya Pradesh, in 1875 when the building was being reconstructed. Shortly after it was discovered, the sculpture was brought to the attention of William Kincaid (Indian Civil Service) who had been working in central India since 1866. He brought the sculpture to Britain in 1886 when he returned from India and in 1891 deposited it with Augustus Wollaston Franks (1826-1897) at the British Museum. In 1909, when Kincaid died, the sculpture became part of the British Museum collections.

== Iconography ==
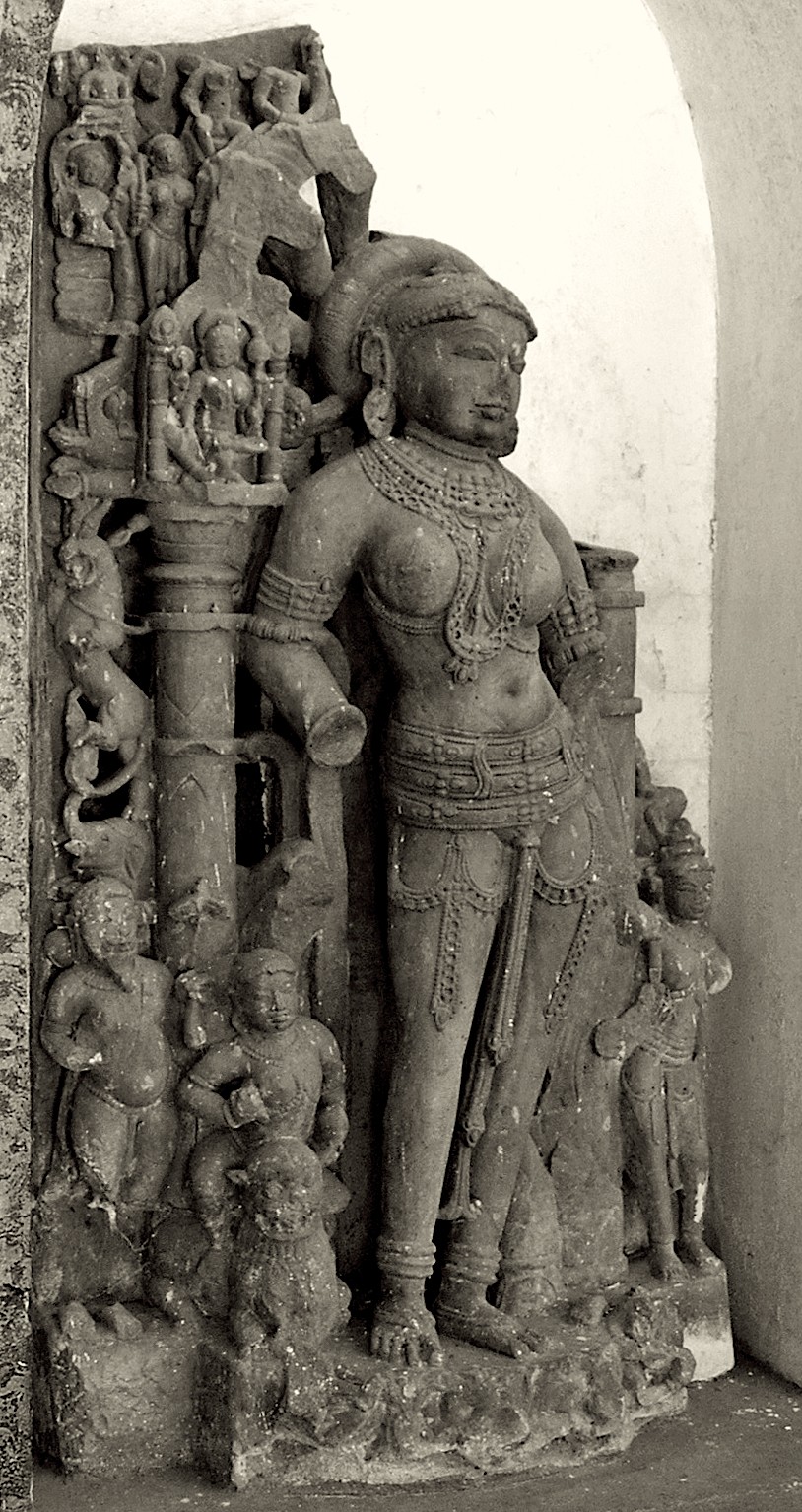
Sehore (Madhya Pradesh). Ambikā, 11th century. Now in the Collector's Office, Sehore.

The goddess Ambika is carved from white marble in high relief and wears a tiered headdress with her hair tied to one side. The ends of two of the four arms of the goddess are missing; in the two complete arms, she clasps an elephant goad (aṅkuśa) and either a noose or the stalk of a plant. On the base are various other deities or spirit attendants in relief. The definitive study of Ambikā was published by M. N. P. Tiwari, to which volume the interested reader is referred.

On the stepped face of the base, below the goddess's feet, is a small kneeling female donor, engraved in outline form.

A close parallel to the Dhār image is found in a sandstone sculpture in Sehore that dates to the eleventh century. This sculpture is also damaged, with arms and attributes missing, but preserves a seated Jina at the top. At the base there are similar figures of a bearded sage and a youth riding a tiger.

== Inscription ==
The inscription, composed in Sanskrit verse and written in Nāgarī script, records the creation of a statue of Ambā, more generally known as Ambikā. The inscription has been studied on a number of occasions with readings at variance due to the abraded stone surface on which the record is engraved. The prevailing view is that the individual named Soṣā, mentioned in the second pāda, is the grammatical subject of record and the donor of the sculpture. As a lay-follower, Soṣā states herself to be well-disciplined and devoted to the Vidyādharī lineage of Jain preceptors. This lineage had deep roots in north India and was known in the Paramāra period. The inscription tells us that Soṣā, prior to commissioning the statue of Ambikā, had earlier made three Jinas and a figure of Vāgdevī, the goddess of speech. Vāgdevī, otherwise Sarasvati, was a particularly popular deity among the Jains, as we learn from episodes in the Prabandhacintāmaṇi of Merutunga. The inscription is dated Vikrama year 1091 (1034-35 CE), with king Bhoja clearly named. Bhoja belonged to the Paramara dynasty that took Dhar as their sometime capital, along with Ujjain.

The inscription, critical edition and translation are visible online but are given here for ready reference:

Sanskrit (metre is Śārdūlavikrīḍita).

śrīmadbhoja-nareṃdra-caṃdranagarī-vidyādharī-dharmmadhīḥ [*|] soṣā nāma suśāsanā khalu sukha-prasthāpanāy=āpsarāḥ [*||]

vāgdevī[*ṃ] prathama[*ṃ] vidhāya jananī[*ṃ]pas[*c*]āj jinānā[*ṃ] trayīm [*|] ambā[*ṃ] nitya-phalādikāṃ vararuci[*ṃ] m[*ū]rtti[*ṃ] s[*u]bhā[*ṃ] nirmmame [*||]

Colophon (Prose): iti subhaṃ || sūtradhāra-sahira-sutamaṇathaleṇa ghaṭitaṃ || vi[*jñ]ānika śivadevena likhitam iti |[*|] saṃvat 100 91 [*||]

Translation

The lady named Sosā lived in the city of Bhoja, a moon among kings. Her religious devotion was fixed on the Vidyādharī lineage of Jains. She was well disciplined and, in truth, an apsara who bestowed happiness. She first installed Vāgdevī, the Mother, and the triad of Jinas. She also created this auspicious image of Ambā who is radiant in beauty and grants lasting rewards.

Colophon: Blessings! It was fashioned by Maṇathala, son of the craftsman (sūtradhāra) Sahira. It was written by the artisan (vijñānin) Śivadeva. Year CE 1034-35.
