= Dhanapāla =

Jain author

Dhanapāla was an author and convert to Jainism, born at Ujjain in 973 (saṃvat 1029). His death date is not recorded but was likely in the 1050s. Born a Hindu and brāhmaṇa in the Kāśyapa gotra, he was first opposed to Jainism, but was eventually won over by his brother Śobhana in about 977. Śobhaṇa was a pupil of the Jain preceptor Mahendra (Candragaccha).

For the greater part of his life, Dhānapāla lived in Dhar (ancient Dhārā) where he had much influence on the court of the Paramāra rulers. According to Merutunga, Dhānapāla was the leading paṇḍit in the kingdom.

Dhanapāla is best known for his literary works on account of which he bore the epithet siddhasārasvatakavi (the 'poet whose accomplishment is derived from Sarasvatī'). Among his famous works are Ṛṣabhapañcāśikā, a poetic hymn to the first Jina Adinātha, and the Prakrit lexicon Pāiyalacchīnāmamālā, in the closing verses of which the author states that the work was completed in saṃvat 1029 (972–73).

The Tilakamañjarī, a prose romance, is exceptionally well known and studied. On account of this work, composed just after his conversion to Jainism, Dhanapāla was given the title ‘Sarasvatī’ by Vākpati Muñja (c. 973–995). The name involves a play on words given Sarasvatī is also known as Vāgdevī, 'the Goddess of Speech' and Muñja's epithet Vākpati means 'Lord of Speech', i.e. Brahmā, the male consort of Sarasvatī.
