= William Kincaid (civil servant) =

Indian administrator (1831 – 1909)

William Kincaid (1831–1909) was an administrator in India. A member of the Indian Civil Service, he rose to the rank of major-general and was sometime resident of Bhopal. He was married to Pattie Kincaid and they had a son, Charles Augustus Kincaid.

== Biography ==
Kincaid was born on 30 October 1831 and went to India as an ensign in the Madras Army in March 1849. In 1864 his career in Malwa began when he was appointed to adjust boundaries disputes in the Bhopal Agency. In 1866 he shifted to Bundelkhand as an assistant political agent and was a judge and cantonment magistrate in Nowgong, Chhatarpur.

Kincaid was promoted to political agent, Bhopal in August 1876. In 1879 he became the political agent, Bhopawar, and commandant, Malwa Bhil Corps. Finally, in 1881, Kincaid returned to Bhopal as political agent.

In 1886, Kincaid returned to Europe and in 1890 was promoted to the rank of major-general. In 1891 he moved to Italy, but by the time of his death on 2 November 1909, he had returned to Britain. He died in Bournemouth.

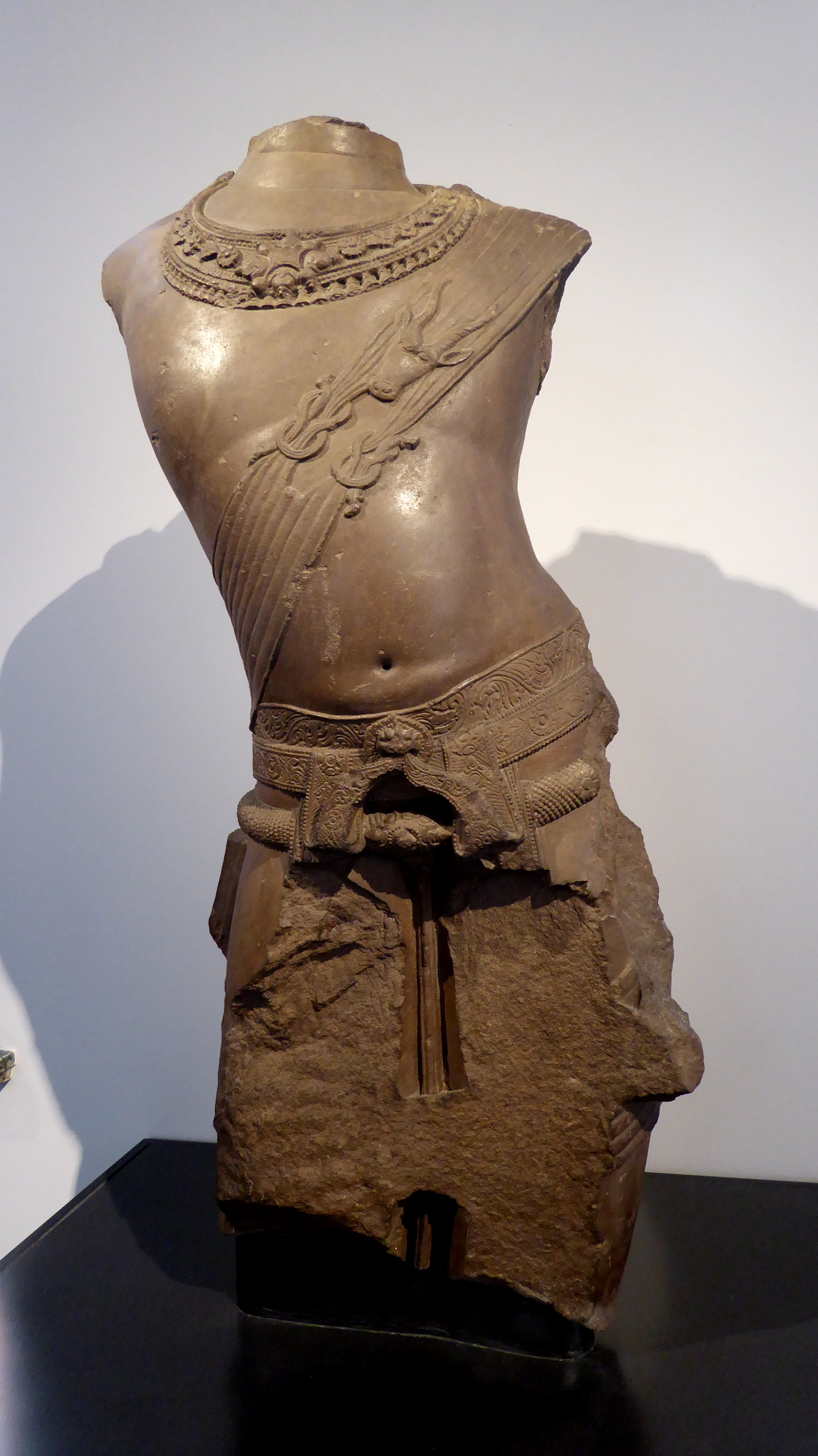
The Sanchi Torso, V&A number IM.184-1910

== Antiquarian Activities ==
Aside from some publications on Malwa, Kincaid is best known for the Sanchi Torso at the Victoria and Albert Museum which he put on loan to the museum when he left for Italy. The sculpture was purchased from his widow after his death.
