= Arjunavarman =

King of Malwa from 1210 to 1215

- Tri-vidhi-vira-chudamani

King of Malwa
- Reign: February 1210 – 1215
- Predecessor: Subhatavarman
- Successor: Devapala
- Spouse: Jayashri; Sarvakala
Regnal name
- Arjunavarman
- Dynasty: Paramara
- Father: Subhatavarman
- Religion: Hinduism

Locations of Arjunavarman's inscriptions (map of Madhya Pradesh)

Arjunavarman (died 1215) was an Indian king from the Paramara dynasty, who ruled in the Malwa region of central India.

== Military career ==
Arjuna succeeded his father Subhatavarman, and invaded the kingdom of the Chaulukyas of Gujarat. The 14th century writer Merutunga calls him the "destroyer of Gujarat". Arjuna defeated Jayanta-simha (or Jaya-simha), who had usurped the Solanki throne for a brief period. The 1211 Piplianagar grant of Arjuna refers to his victory over Jayanta, so Arjuna's Gujarat invasion must have happened before this time. An inscription from Bhopal indicates that he had reached Bharuch by 1213. The Dhar prashasti inscription states that he defeated Jayasimha in the Parva mountain valley (possibly Pavagadh). It also states that Arjuna captured Jayanta's daughter Jayashri, and fell in love with her. According to Asoke Majumdar, this suggests that Jayanta made peace with the Paramaras through a marriage alliance.

When the Yadava ruler Simhana invaded Lata (southern Gujarat), Arjuna's Chahamana general Salakhanasimha defeated him. Later, the Yadava king sent another force led by his general Kholeshvara to Lata. This second invasion resulted in the Paramara feudatory's defeat.

Arjunavarman married the Hoysala princess Sarvakala, who was probably a daughter of grand-daughter of the Hoysala king Ballala. Simhana's invasion of the Hoysala territory appears to have led a fresh conflict between the Paramaras and the Yadavas. Simhana invaded the Paramara kingdom in 1215, and according to the later Yadava court poet Hemadri, this invasion resulted in the defeat and death of Arjunavarman. The veracity of Hemadri's claim is doubtful, as the 1222 Bahal inscription mentions Arjunavarman's defeat, but not his death. The Tiluvalli inscription also states that Simhana humbled the lord of Malwa.

== Other activities ==
Arjuna assumed the title Trividhivīracūḍāmaṇi. In his inscriptions, Arjunavarman claimed to be an reincarnation of his illustrious ancestor king Bhoja. He was a patron of scholars, and himself an accomplished poet. He is best known from a eulogistic inscription of his reign which takes the form of play called the Vijayaśrīnāṭikā, composed by Madana, the king's preceptor. In this work, which is not known from manuscript sources, Madana makes Arjunavarman the chief protagonist.

Arjunavarman's 1211 inscription, found at Piplianagar near Shajapur, records the donation of a village. A 1213 inscription, discovered at Sehore (and possibly originally found at Piplianagar) also records a village grant. Another inscription from Sehore, dated 1215, records a land grant to a Brahmin.
