= Art of Mathura =

Ancient school of art, especially sculpture, in India

Art of Mathura

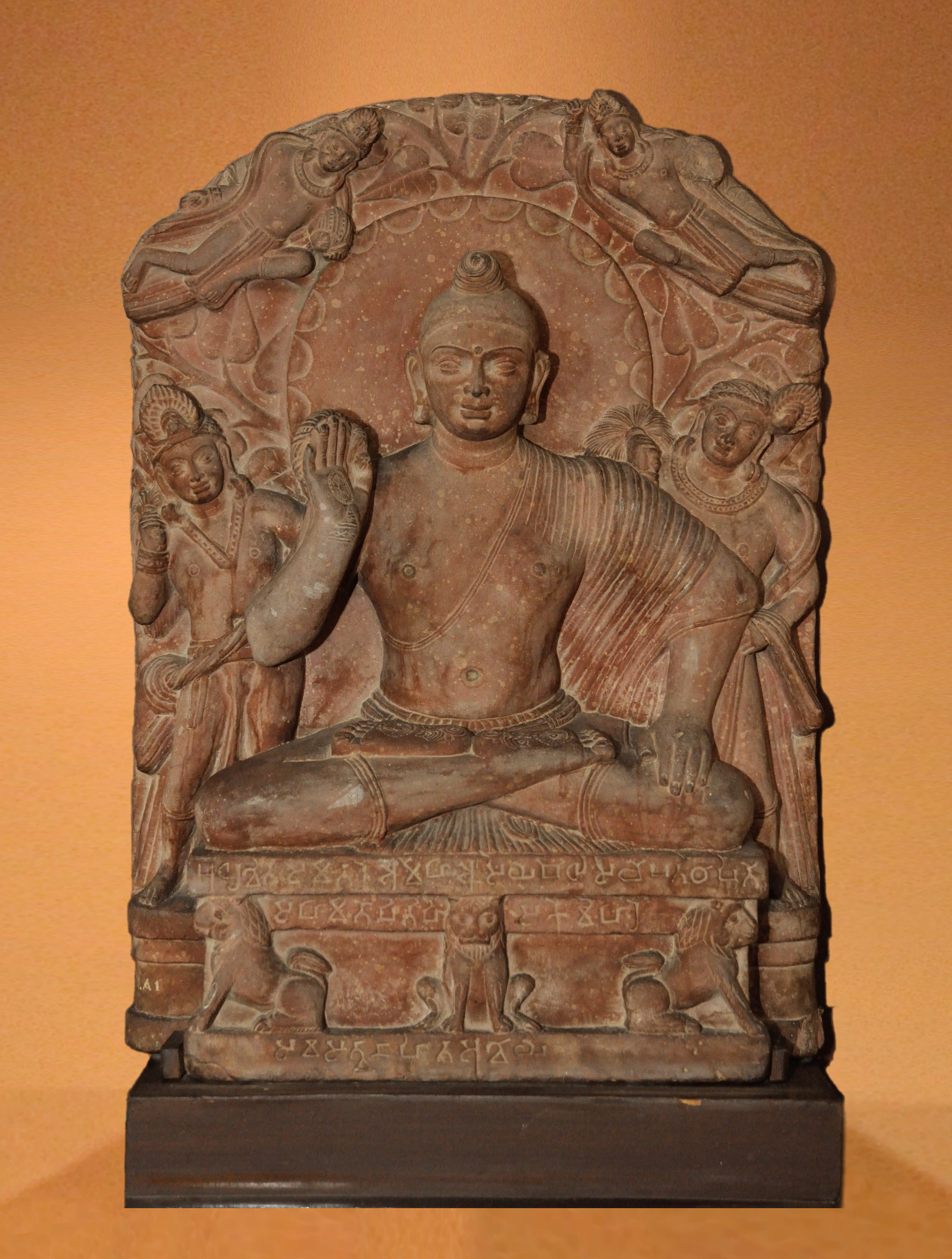
The "Katra stele". Seated Bodhisattva Shakyamuni in Abhaya mudra, with inscription "Amoha-asi (...) erected this Bodhisattva". Northern Satraps, end of 1st century CE. This is the finest and best preserved of the so-called Kapardin statues.

Location of the city of Mathura in India, centre of the development of Mathura art.

The Art of Mathura refers to a particular school of Indian art, almost entirely surviving in the form of sculpture, starting in the 2nd century BCE, which centred on the city of Mathura, in central northern India, during a period in which Buddhism, Jainism together with Hinduism flourished in India. Mathura "was the first artistic center to produce devotional icons for all the three faiths", and the pre-eminent centre of religious artistic expression in India at least until the Gupta period, and was influential throughout the sub-continent.

Chronologically, Mathuran sculpture becomes prominent after Mauryan art, the art of the Mauryan Empire (322 and 185 BCE). It is said to represent a "sharp break" with the previous Mauryan style, either in scale, material or style. Mathura became India's most important artistic production center from the second century BCE, with its highly recognizable red sandstone statues being admired and exported all over India. In particular, it was in Mathura that the distinctive Indian convention of giving sacred figures multiple body parts, especially heads and arms, first became common in art around the 4th century CE, initially exclusively in Hindu figures, as it derived from Vedic texts.

The art of Mathura is often contrasted with the Greco-Buddhist art of Gandhara, which developed from the 1st century CE. In particular, there is a debate about the origin of the Buddha image and the role played by each school of art. Before the creation of an image of the Buddha, probably around the 1st century CE, Indian Buddhist art, as seen in Bharhut or Sanchi, had essentially been aniconic, avoiding representation of the Buddha, but rather relying on its symbols, such as the Wheel of the Law or the Bodhi tree.

Mathura continued to be an important centre for sculpture until Gupta art of the 4th to 6th centuries, if not beyond. After this time much of the sculpture was of Hindu figures.

== History ==
=== Early history ===
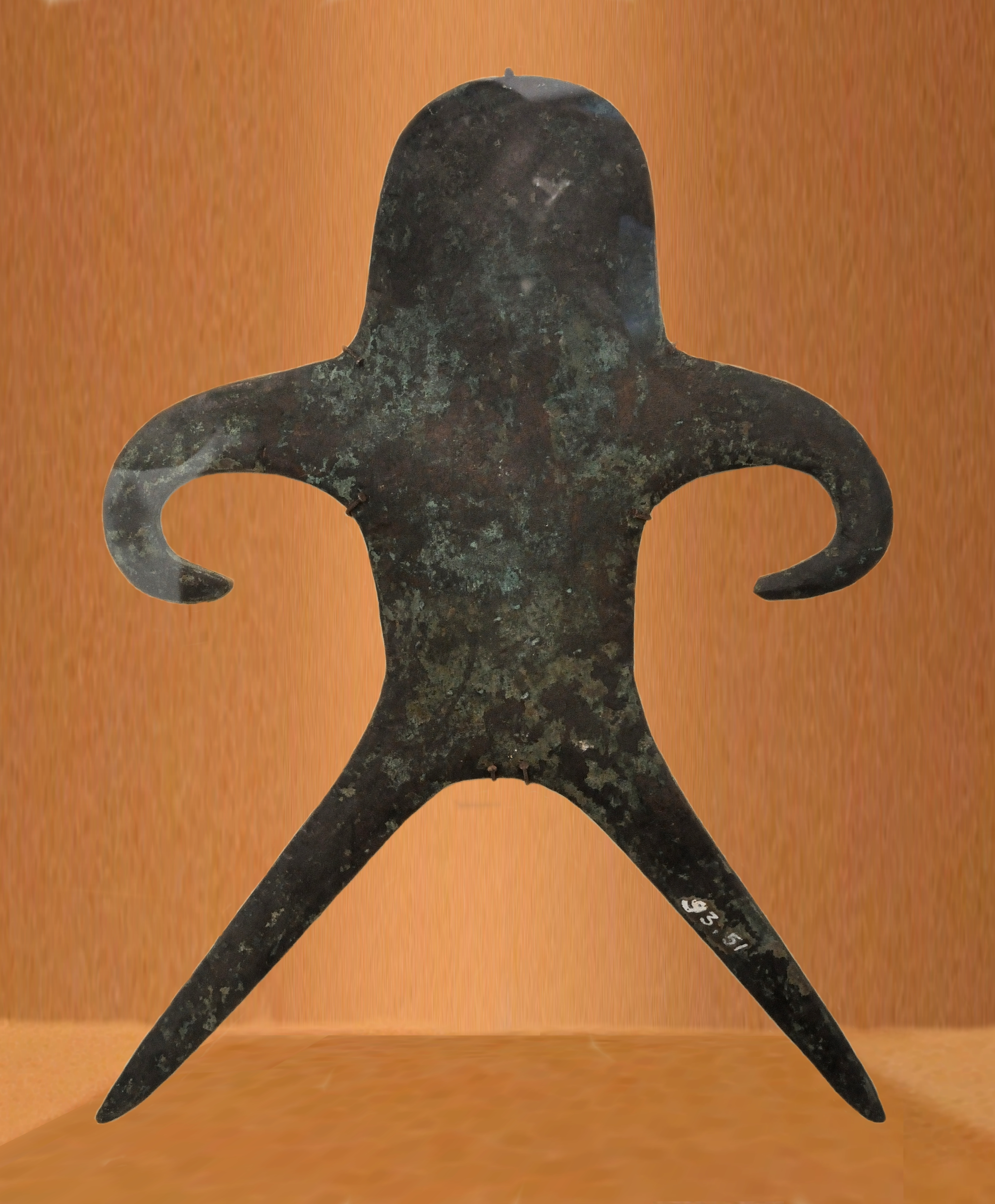
Mathura anthropomorphological artefact. Copper Hoard culture (2nd millennium BCE). Mathura Museum.

Some very early depictions of deities seem to appear in the art of the Indus Valley Civilisation, but the following millennium, coinciding with the Indo-Aryan migration during the Vedic period, is devoid of such remains. It has been suggested that the early Vedic religion focused exclusively on the worship of purely "elementary forces of nature by means of elaborate sacrifices", which did not lend themselves easily to anthropomorphological representations. Various artefacts may belong to the Copper Hoard culture (2nd millennium BCE), some of them suggesting anthropomorphological characteristics. Interpretations vary as to the exact signification of these artifacts, or even the culture and the periodization to which they belonged. Some examples of artistic expression also appear in abstract pottery designs during the Black and red ware culture (1450–1200 BCE) or the Painted Grey Ware culture (1200–600 BCE), with finds in a wide area, including the area of Mathura.

Most of the early finds at Mathura correspond to what is called the "second period of urbanization" in the middle of the 1st millennium BCE, after a gap of about a thousand years following the collapse of the Indus Valley civilisation. The anthropomorphic depiction of various deities apparently started in the middle of the 1st millennium BCE, possibly as a consequence of the influx of foreign stimuli initiated with the Achaemenid conquest of the Indus Valley, and the rise of alternative local faiths challenging Vedism, such as Buddhism, Jainism and local popular cults.

=== Mauryan period ===
Mathura seems to have been a comparatively unimportant city of central northern India during the period of the Maurya Empire (ca. 320–180 BCE), whose capital was in eastern India at Pataliputra, but it was still called a "great city" by Megasthenes. Mauryan art and architecture flourished during that period in other cities such as Pataliputra, Kausambi, Vidisha or Amaravati, but there are no known examples of stone sculpture or architecture at Mathura that can be securely dated to the Mauryan period. Excavations have shown that the first construction consisted in a mud wall, dating to the end of the Maurya period, around the 3rd century BCE at the earliest. It seems Mathura only rose to prominence as a cultural and urban center around 150–100 BCE.

==== Terracotta figurines (4th-2nd century BCE) ====
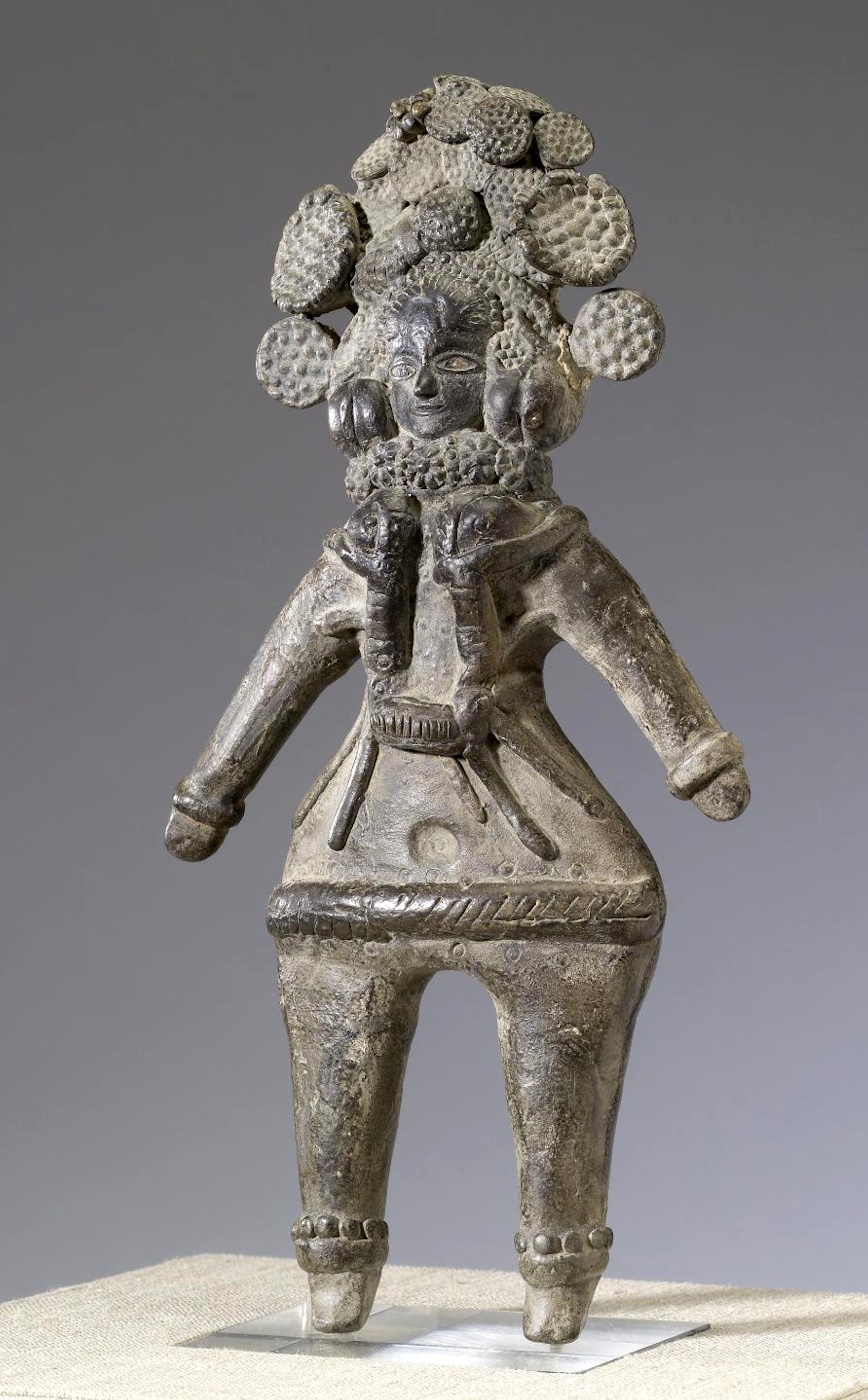
A terracotta votive figurine from Mathura. The wide hips and fantastic floral headdress suggest a devotion towards fertility and abundance. She has lotus stalks in her head, and children clinging to her. Height: 25.7 cm (10.1 ″). Mathura, 3rd–2nd century BCE.

Although no stone sculpture or architecture from the Mauryan period are known in Mathura, some relatively high quality terracotta statuettes have been recovered from the Mauryan strata in excavations. This would suggest that there was some level of artistic creation at Mathura during the period of the Maurya Empire. The creation of terracotta figurines is thought to have been much easier than sculpting stone, and therefore became the mainstream form of artistic expression. In Mathura, the first statuette were found in strata dating to the late 4th-2nd centuries BCE, and their production, together with associated terracotta miniatures of votive tanks and shrines, seems to have continued for close to a thousand years.

Terracottas generally showed what appears to be female deities or mother goddesses, and from the 2nd century women in elaborate headdress. The ancient Vedic text of the Shatapatha Brahmana describes such figurines as "broad-hipped, of smooth breast-region and slender waisted" and suggests that they are personifications of the earth, especially the earth goddesses Prithivi and Aditi, as "the container and supporter of the whole world", and the "repository of all Gods". Their headdress is often decorated with lotus stalks, complete with conical lotus pistils with their seeds, which symbolize fecundity and beauty. The lotus would remain an attribute of female deities in later periods. Some terracotta statuettes also show a child or children clinging to the goddess, thereby emphasizing her role as a symbol of fecundity. The cult of these female goddesses, characterized by small and easily manufactured figures, appears to have been essentially domestic.

Several figures of foreigners also appear in the terracottas from the 4th and 3rd century BCE, which are either described simply as "foreigners" or Persian or Iranian because of their foreign features. These figurines might reflect the increased contacts of Indians with Iranian people during this period. Several of these seem to represent foreign soldiers who visited India during the Mauryan period and influenced modellers in Mathura with their peculiar ethnic features and uniforms. One of the terracotta statuettes, a man nicknamed the "Persian nobleman" and dated to the 2nd century BCE, can be seen wearing a coat, scarf, trousers and a turban.

Terracotta figurine production evolved with the adoption of moulds in the 3rd–2nd century BCE.

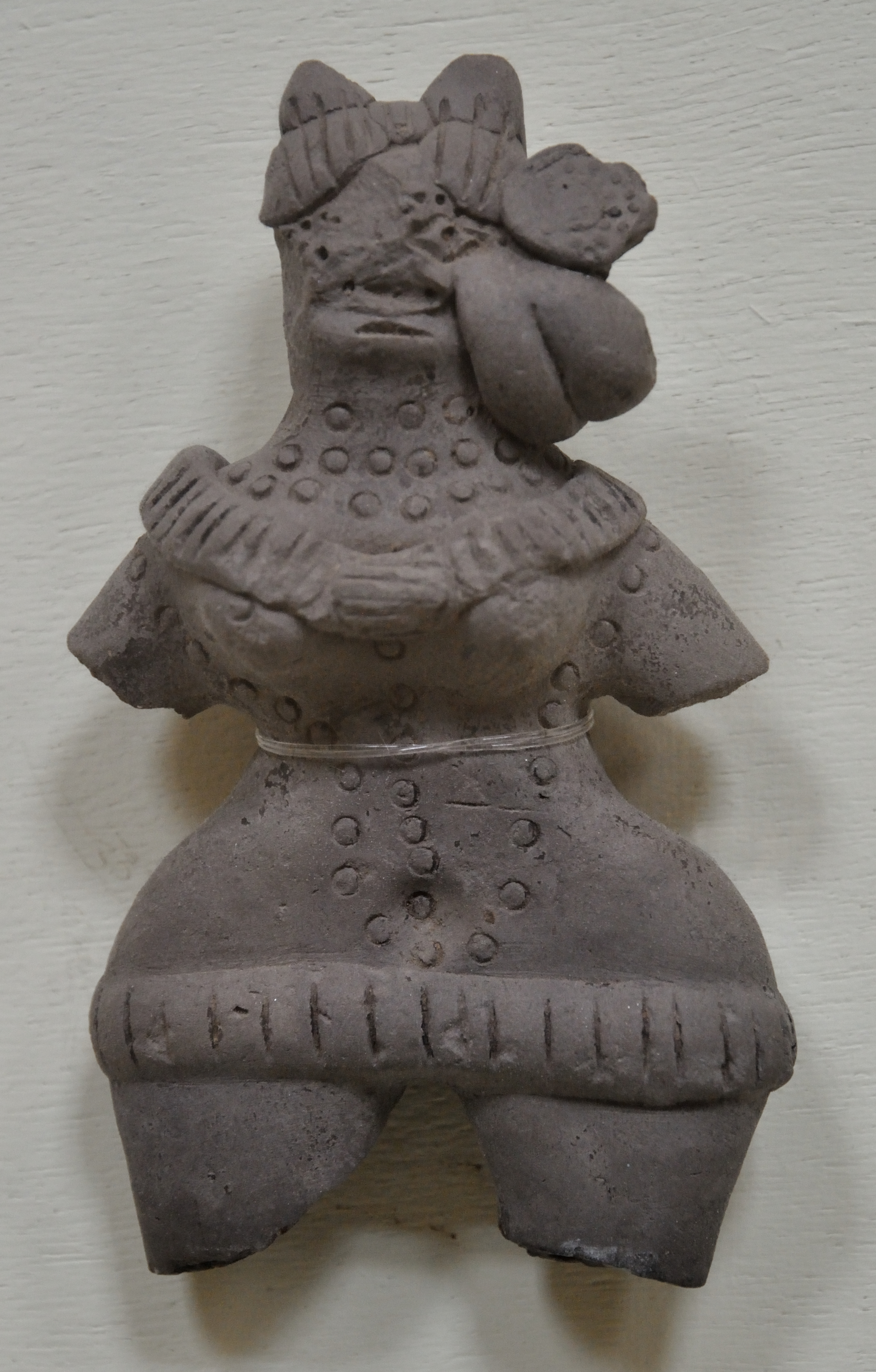
Terracotta figurine, Mathura, 4th century BCE

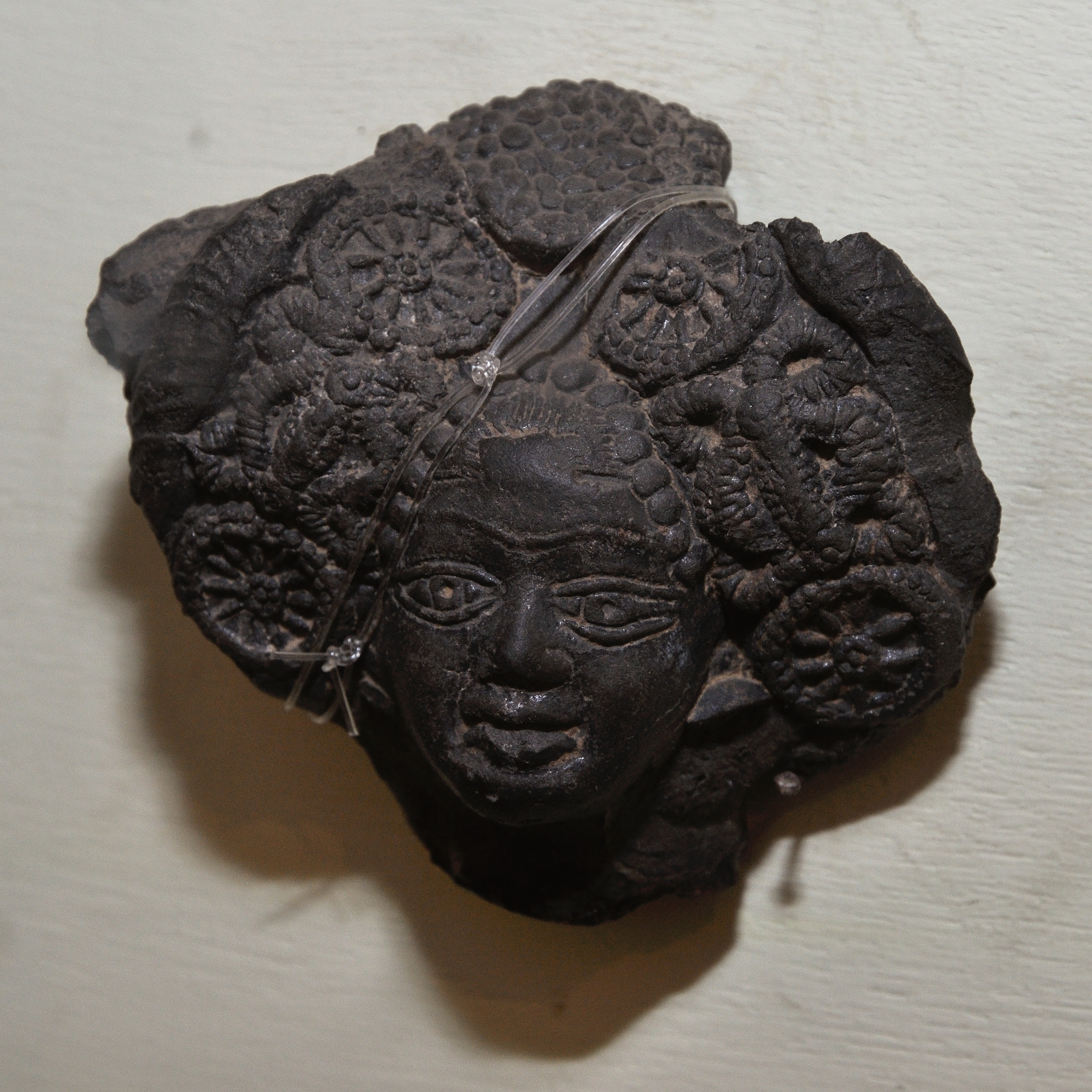
Terracotta female coiffure, Mathura, 2nd century BCE

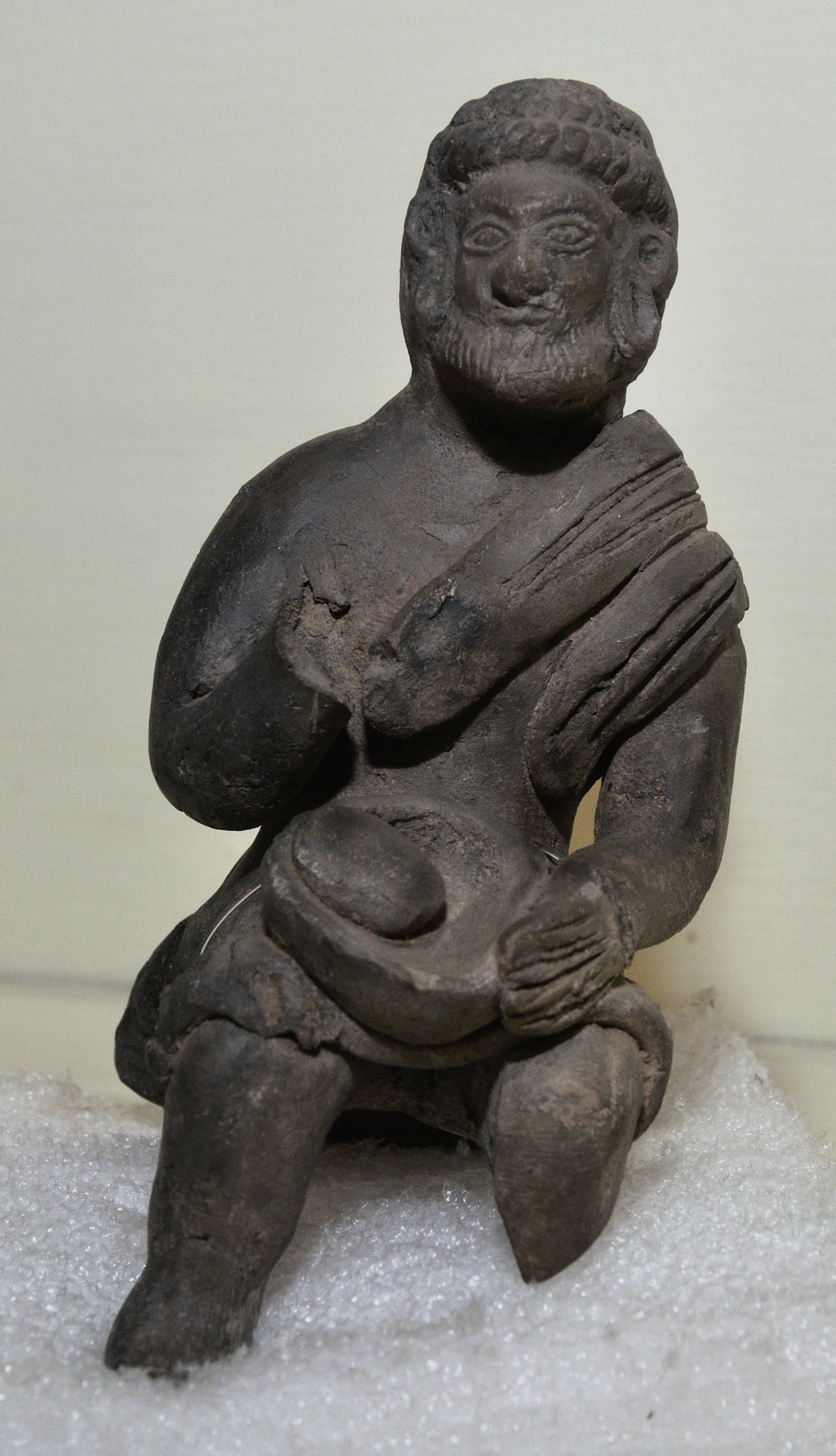
"Ethnic head", Mathura, c. 2nd century BCE.

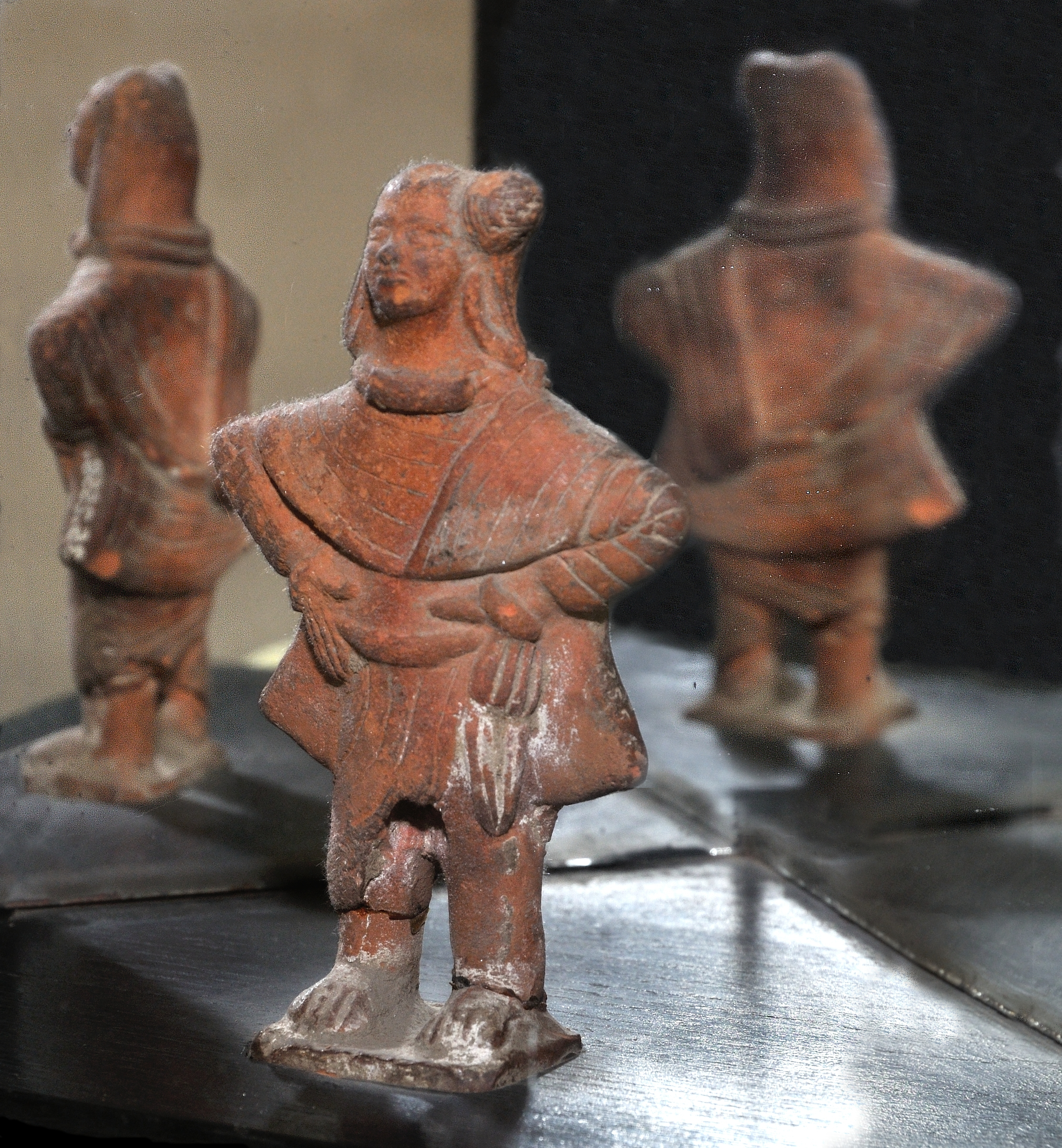
"Persian Nobleman clad in coat dupatta trouser and turban", Mathura, c. 2nd Century BCE.

==== Early depictions of Indian deities (190–180 BCE) ====
Early depictions of Indian deities

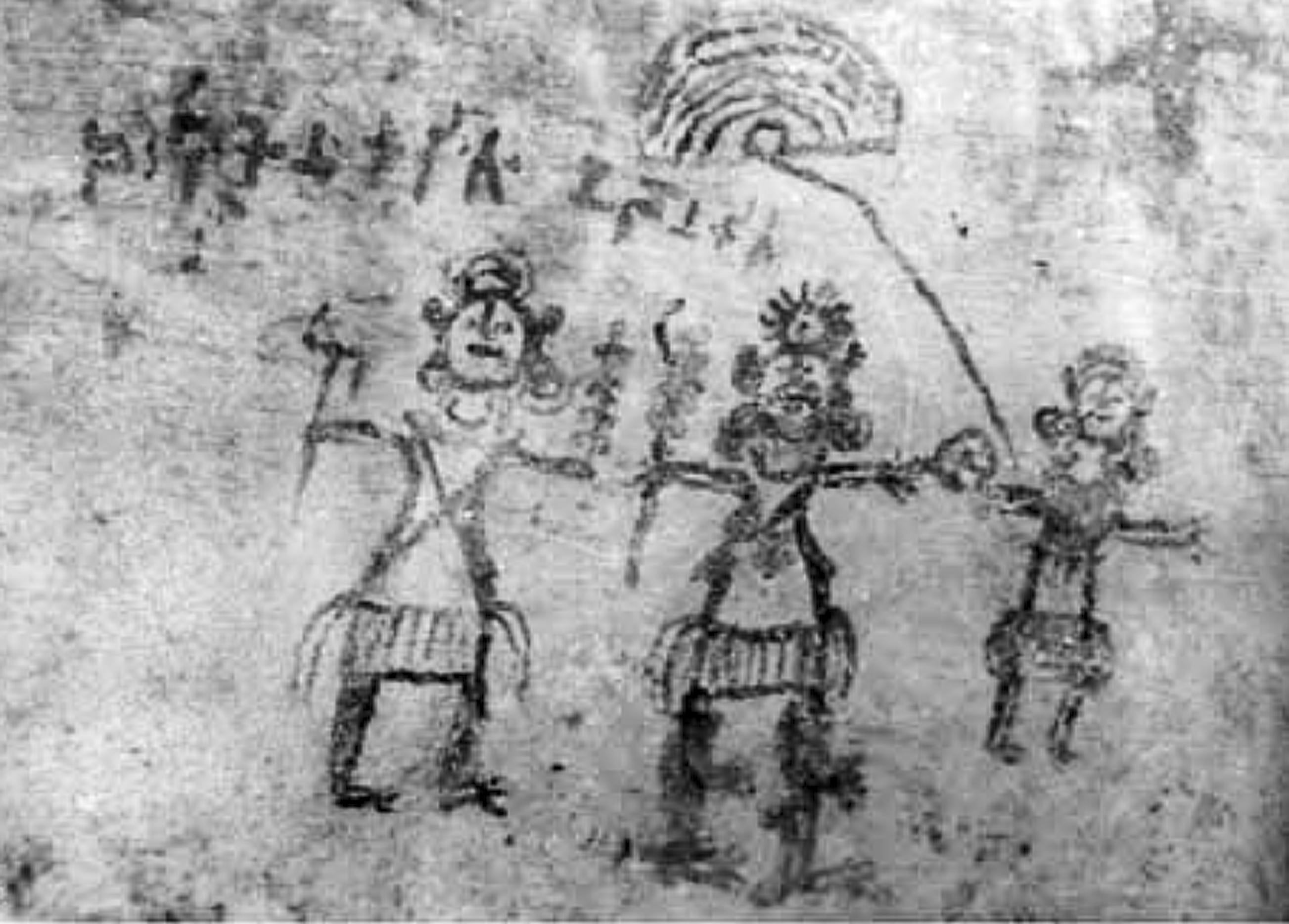
Samkarshana, Vāsudeva and the female Goddess Ekanamsha shown in a rock painting at Tikla, near Mathura, 3rd–2nd century BCE.

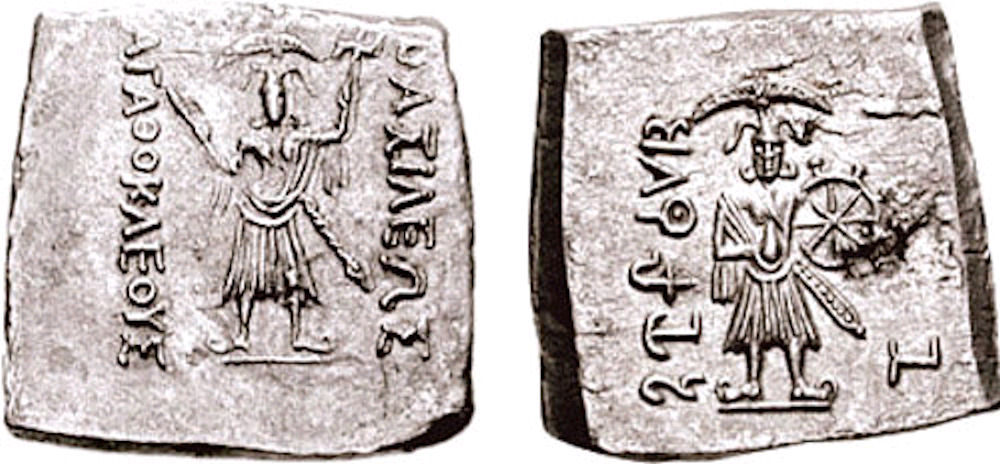
Indian deities Samkarshana and Vāsudeva on the coinage of the Indo-Greek king Agathocles, minted not far west of Mathura c. 190–180 BCE. These are considered as "the earliest unambiguous" images of these deities.

The anthropomorphic depiction of various deities apparently started to appear in the middle of the 1st millennium BCE. Panini and Patanjali seem to mention depictions of Shiva, Skanda, Visaka, Vāsudeva-Krishna and Arjuna. In particularly, the worship of Balarama-Samkarshana and Vāsudeva-Krishna seems to have originated in Mathura, where they were revered as members of the five Vrishni heroes, and spread from there.

Before the introduction of stone sculpture, there may have been an older tradition of using clay or wood to represent Indian deities, which, because of their inherent fragility, have not survived. Apart from the local terracotta figurines generally showing female fertility deities, there are no early remains of such representations of Indian deities. Probably the earliest known Indian depiction of these Mathuran deities is a rock painting found at Tikla, around 170 kilometers south of Mathura, on the road from Mathura to Tumain and Ujjain. This rock painting is dated to the 3rd–2nd century BCE, based on the paleography of the Brahmi inscription accompanying it. Here, the deities are depicted wearing a dhoti with a peculiar headdress, and are shown holding their attributes: a plow and a sort of mace for Balarama, and a mace and a wheel for Vāsudeva. A third smaller character is added, forming what can be called a Vrishni trio, in the person of a female, thought to be the Goddess Ekanamsha, who seems to hold a Chatra royal umbrella.

The "earliest unambiguous" images of these deities, is an indirect testimony appearing with the coinage of the Indo-Greek king Agathocles, who issued coins with the image of Indian deities in Indian style, together with legends in the Greek and Brahmi scripts, circa 180–190 BCE. The coins were probably issued in an area not far west of Mathura, if not in Mathura itself, since they depict Vāsudeva, whose cult was famous in Mathura, and employ the Brahmi script, which was in use in the region, rather than the northwestern Kharoshthi script. The Indo-Greeks may have played a major role in breaking the Vedic tradition of representing deities through symbols only, rather than in human form, since Greek art did not have any such restrictions.

The depictions of Indian deities, as witnessed by the Indo-Greeks transferred on their coinage, are generally thought to refer to Balarama-Samkarshana and Vāsudeva-Krishna, shown together with their rather unambiguous attributes, especially the Gada mace and the plow for the former, and the Vishnu attributes of the Shankha (a pear-shaped case or conch) and the Sudarshana Chakra wheel for the latter. The worship of these deities is known to have originated in Mathura before spreading to other areas of India, especially since Krishna and his brother Balarama were born in Mathura to the Vrishni king Vasudeva. It is thought that local Indian images, predating the coins but now lost, may have served as models to the engravers. According to Osmund Bopearachchi, the parasol-like headdress of these deities is actually a misrepresentation of a shaft with a half-moon parasol on top (chattra), as seen in later statues of Bodhisattvas in Mathura. Although the style is generally Indian, the boots or the scabbards may have been added by the Indo-Greeks. The heads of the deities are also adorned with billowing ribons.

A dancing goddess in Indian dress also appears on the coinage of Agathocles and Pantaleon, and she is often interpreted as Lakshmi. According to Harry Falk, such acts of devotion towards foreign gods, as can also be seen in the dedication of the Heliodorus pillar, was a logical practice for the Greeks, in order to appropriate the power of local deties: it "should not be regarded as a "conversion" to Hinduism, but rather as the result of a search for the most helpful local powers, upholding own traditions in a foreign garb."

=== Early stone sculpture in Mathura (180–70 BCE) ===
Main polities and Buddhist centers around Mathura in 180–70 BCE.

The period after 180 BCE has generally been called the "Sunga period", from the name of the Hindu Sunga Empire (c. 180–80 BCE) which replaced the Mauryan Empire in eastern India. This is now thought to be rather inadequate since the Sungas probably never ruled in Mathura: there is no literary, numismatic or epigraphic evidence of a Sunga presence in Mathura.

Following the demise of the Mauryan Empire and its replacement by the Sunga Empire in eastern India, numismatic, literary and epigraphic evidence suggest that the Indo-Greeks, when they invaded India, occupied the area of Mathura for about a century from circa 160 BCE and the time of Menander I until approximately 60 BCE, with the Sungas remaining eastward of Mathura. An inscription in Mathura discovered in 1988, the "Yavanarajya inscription", mentions "The last day of year 116 of Yavana hegemony (Yavanarajya)", suggesting the presence of the Indo-Greeks in the 2nd–1st century BC in Mathura down to 57 BC. On the contrary, the Sungas, are thought to have been absent from Mathura, as no epigraphical remains or coins have been found, and to have been based to the east of the Mathura region. Coins of local Indian rulers of the Mitra dynasty, their names ending in "-mitra", but not using any regnal title such as "King", are also known from the same period and general area (150–50 BCE, mostly in the area of Sonkh), and were possibly engaged in a tributary relationship with the Indo-Greeks.

Stone art and architecture began being produced at Mathura at the time of "Indo-Greek hegemony" over the region. Some authors consider that Indo-Greek cultural elements are not particularly visible in these works, and Hellenistic influence is not more important than in other parts of India. Others consider that Hellenistic influence appears in the liveliness and the realistic details of the figures (an evolution compared to the stiffness of Mauryan art), the use of perspective from 150 BCE, iconographical details such as the knot and the club of Heracles, the wavy folds of the dresses, or the depiction of bacchanalian scenes:

Early Mathura statuary
150–100 BCE

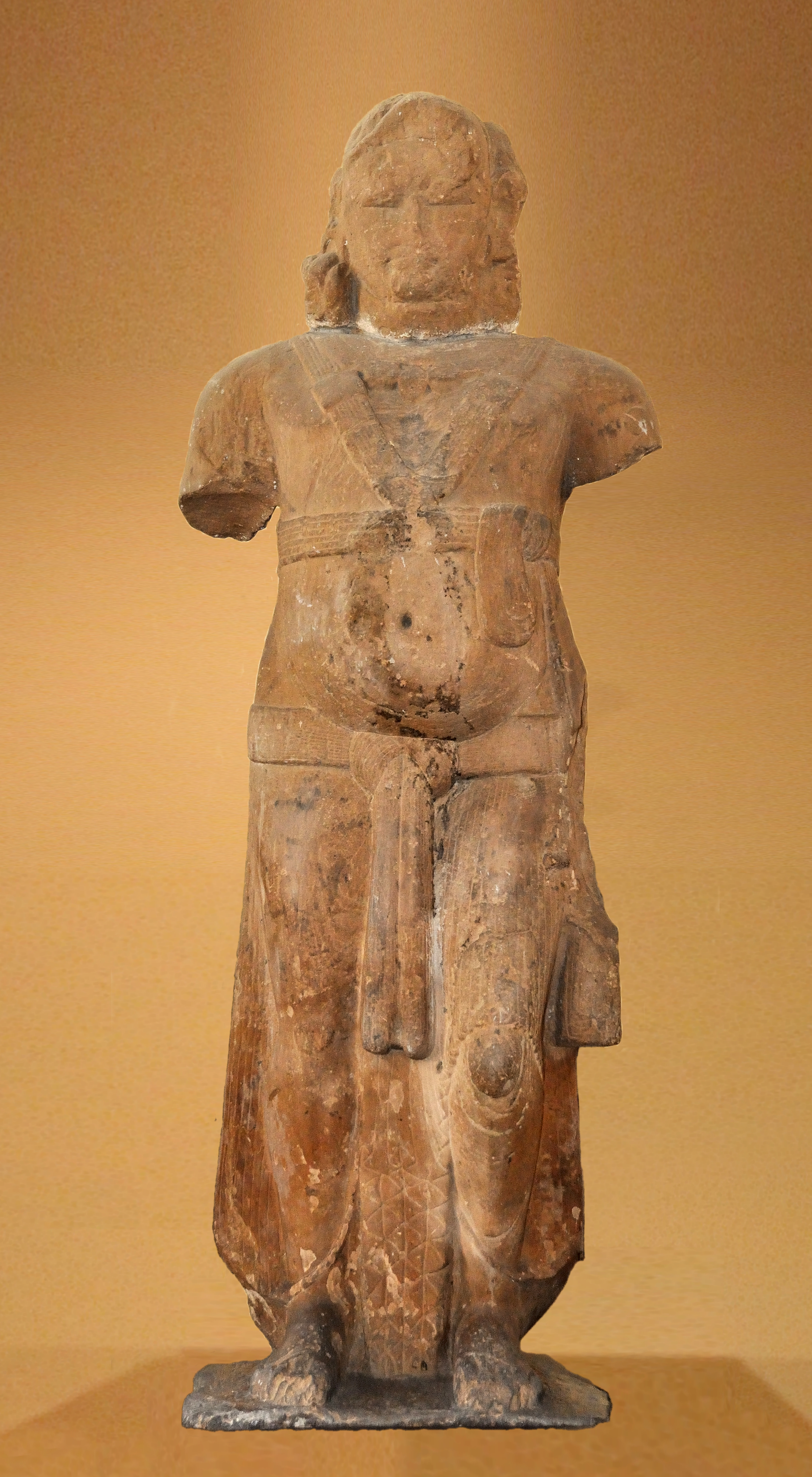
"Parkham Yaksha" Manibhadra, 150 BCE

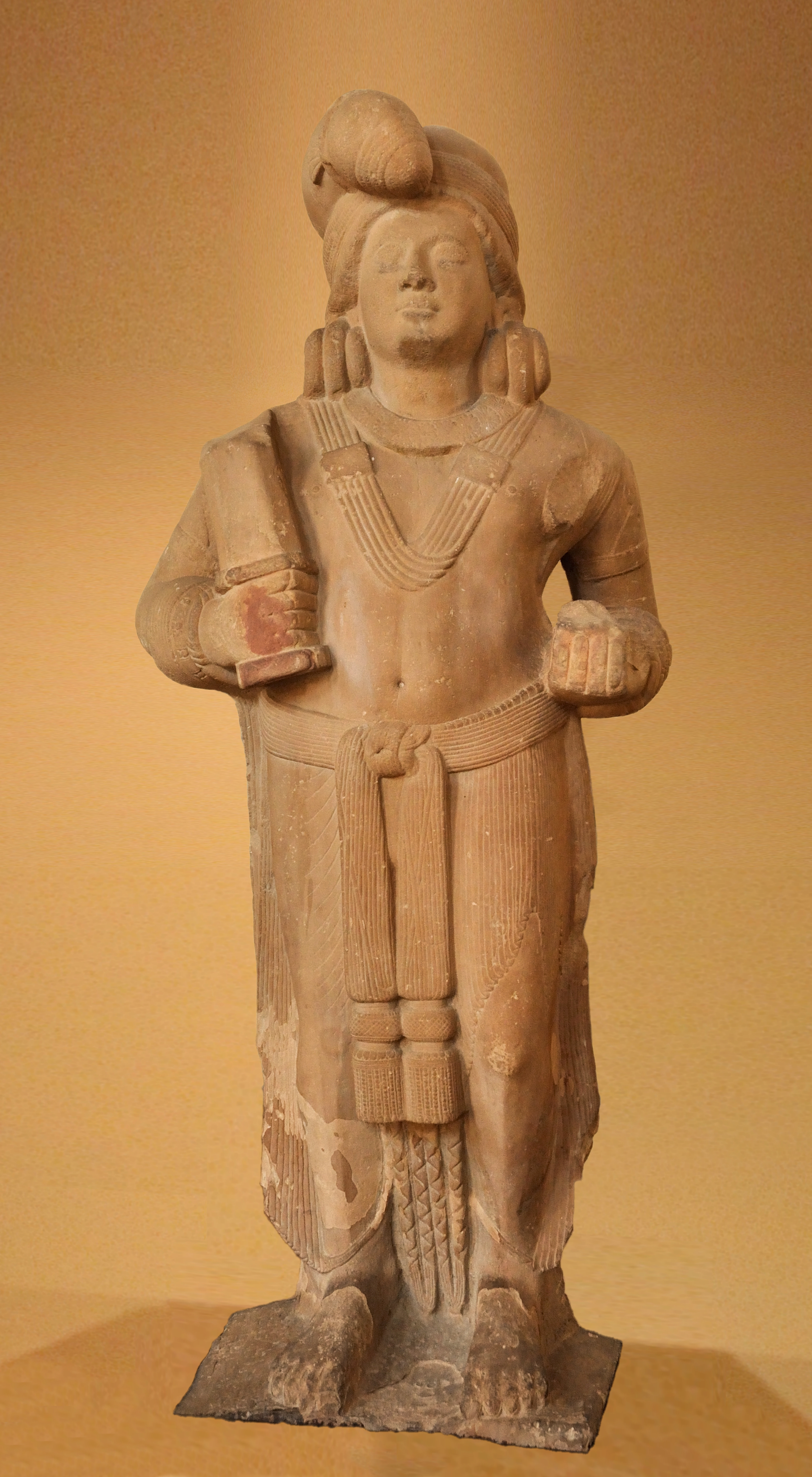
"Mudgarpani" Yaksha ("Mace-holder"), 100 BCE

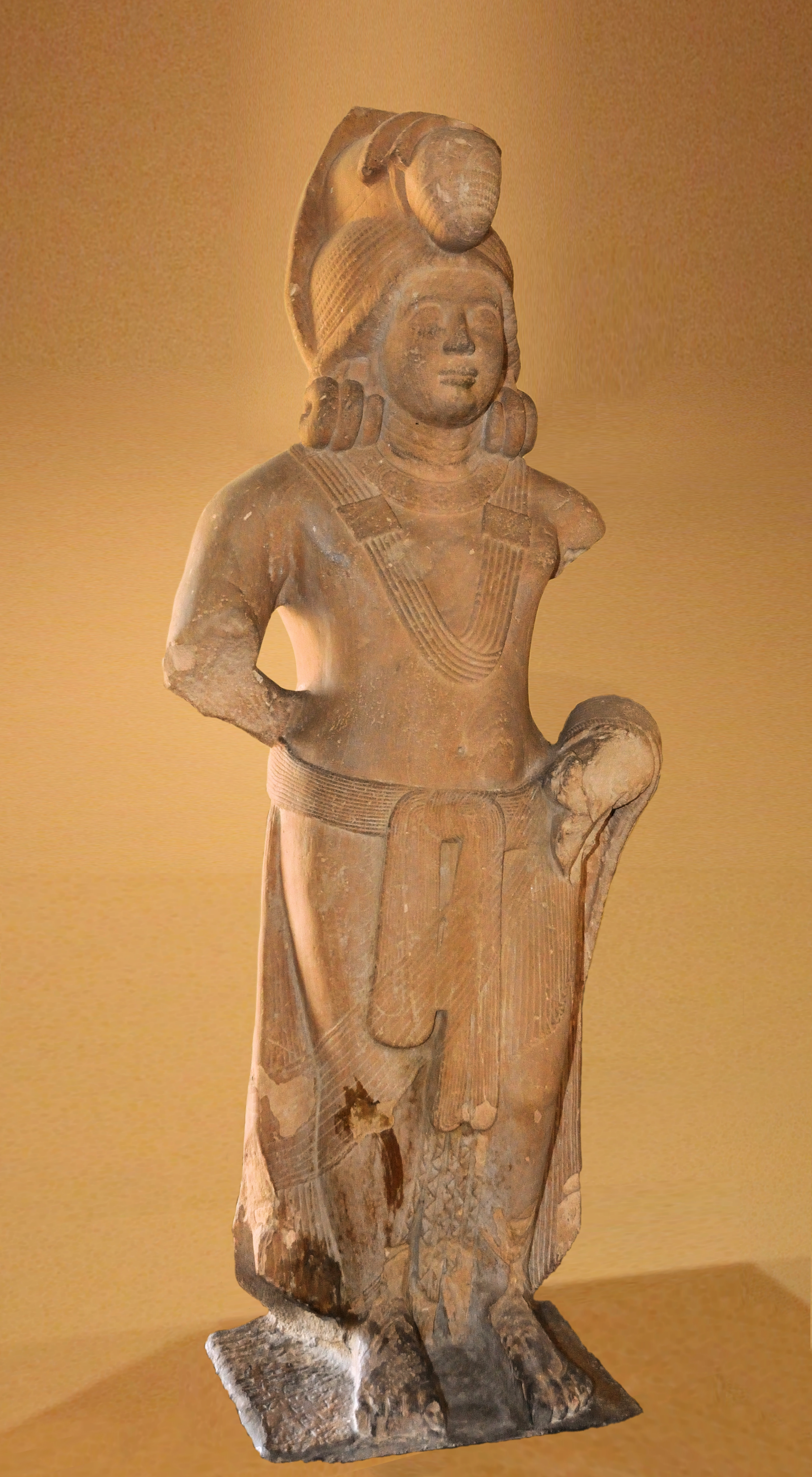
"Agnipani" Yaksha ("Fire-holder"), 100 BCE

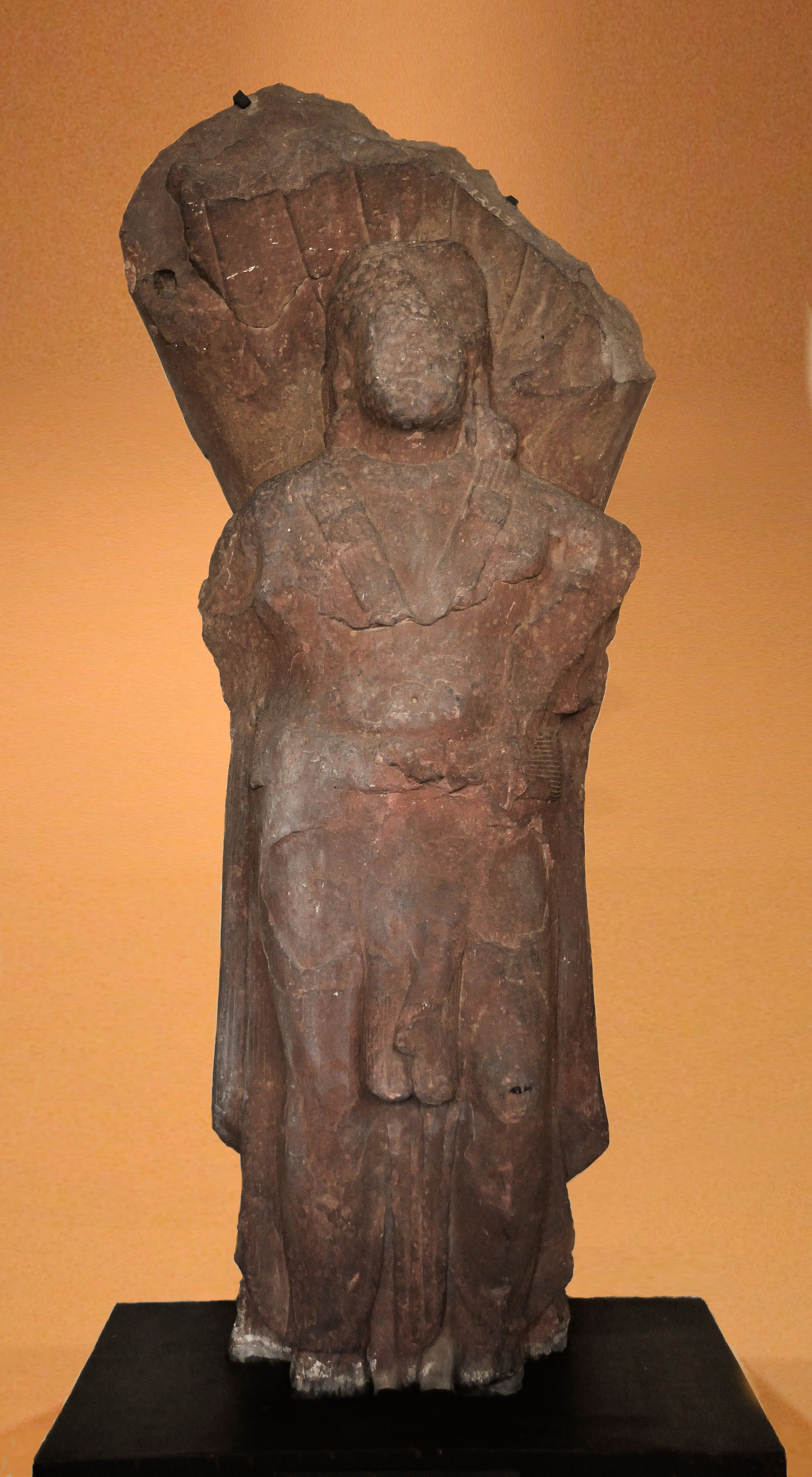
Nāga, the Serpent God
150 BCE

These colossal statues are about 2 meters tall. Many have known attributes: Mudgarpani has a mudgar mace in the right hand, and had a small standing devotee or child in the left hand, the Fire God Agni has an aureole with incised flames and held a water flask in the left hand, the Nāga has a hood formed by serpents. Mathura Museum

"Mathura sculpture is distinguished by several qualitative features of art, culture and religious history. The geographical position of the city on the highway leading from the Madhyadesa towards Madra-Gandhara contributed in a large measure to the eclectic nature of its culture. Mathura became the meeting ground of the traditions of the early Indian art of Bharhut and Sanchi together with strong influences of the Iranian and the Indo-Bactrian or the Gandhara art from the North-West. The Persepolitan capitals with human-headed animal figures and volutes as well as the presence of the battlement motif as a decorative element point to Iranian affinities. These influences came partly as a result of the general saturation of foreign motifs in early Indian sculpture as found in the Stupas of Bharhut and Sanchi also."

— Vasudeva Shrarana Agrawala, Masterpieces of Mathura sculpture

The art of Mathura became extremely influential over the rest of India, and was "the most prominent artistic production center from the second century BCE". There is a remarkable unity in the style of artistic production across northern India during this early period, circa 150 BCE: the early style of Mathura is highly similar to contemporary examples found in Bharhut, Sanchi Stupa No. 2, Vidisha, Bhaja, Pauni, Amaravati, Jaggayyapeta, Bhubaneswar, Udayagiri (in Orissa), Pataliputra, Sarnath, Bhīta (near Allahabad) and Kausambi.

==== Colossal anthropomorphic statues (2nd century BCE) ====
Some of the earliest works of art of the Mathura school are the Yakshas, monumental sculptures in the round of earth divinities that have been dated to the 2nd–1st century BCE. Yakshas seem to have been the object of an important cult in the early periods of Indian history, many of them being known such as Kubera, king of the Yakshas, Manibhadra or Mudgarpani. The Yakshas are a broad class of nature-spirits, usually benevolent, but sometimes mischievous or capricious, connected with water, fertility, trees, the forest, treasure and wilderness, and were the object of popular worship. Many of them were later incorporated into Buddhism, Jainism or Hinduism.

In the 2nd century BCE, Yakshas became the focus of the creation of colossal cultic images, typically around 2 meters or more in height, which are considered as probably the first Indian anthropomorphic productions in stone. The colossal size and quality of these statues shows that they cannot just have been the object of a rural popular cult, but were rather produced in urban workshops and worshipped in shrines by an affluent urban community. Although few ancient Yaksha statues remain in good condition, the vigor of the style has been applauded, and expresses essentially Indian qualities. They are often pot-bellied, two-armed and fierce-looking. The Parkham Yaksha, dated to circa 150 BCE on stylistic grounds and paleographical grounds, is monumental at 2.59 meters high. An inscription says "Made by Gomitaka, a pupil of Kunika. Set up by eight brothers, members of the Manibhadra congregation ("puga")." This inscription thus indicates that the statue represents the Yaksa Manibhadra. The Yashas are often depicted with weapons or attributes, such as the Yaksha Mudgarpani, dated circa 100 BCE, who in the right hand holds a mudgar mace, and in the left hand the figure of a small standing devotee or child joining hands in prayer. It is often suggested that the style of the colossal Yaksha statuary had an important influence on the creation of later divine images and human figures in India. The female equivalent of the Yashas were the Yashinis, often associated with trees and children, and whose voluptuous figures became omnipresent in Indian art.

Some Hellenistic influence, such as the geometrical folds of the drapery or the contrapposto walking stance of the statues, has been suggested. According to John Boardman, the hem of the dress in the monumental early Yaksha statues is derived from Greek art. Describing the drapery of one of these statues, John Boardman writes: "It has no local antecedents and looks most like a Greek Late Archaic mannerism", and suggests it is possibly derived from the Hellenistic art of nearby Bactria where this design is known. Under the Indo-Greeks, the cult of the Yakshas may also have been associated with the Bacchic cult of Dionysos. Since the time of Alexander the Great visiting a city called Nysa in northern India, the Greeks had identified local devotional practices as similar to their cult of Dionysos. They may have promoted a syncretic art which conflated Hellenistic Dionysiac imagery with the local cult of the Yakshas.

In the production of colossal Yaksha statues carved in the round, which can be found in several locations in northern India, the art of Mathura is considered as the most advanced in quality and quantity during this period. In later periods, from the turn of the millennium, Yashkas and Nagas evolved from being benevolent, powerful deities at the center of worship, to becoming frightening demonic creatures acting as subsidiary attendants in the major religions of Buddhism, Jainism and Hinduism. They also became much smaller in size as they were dethroned by the new religions, suggesting the continuation of a cult at the domestic level.

==== Simple reliefs (circa 150–100 BCE) ====
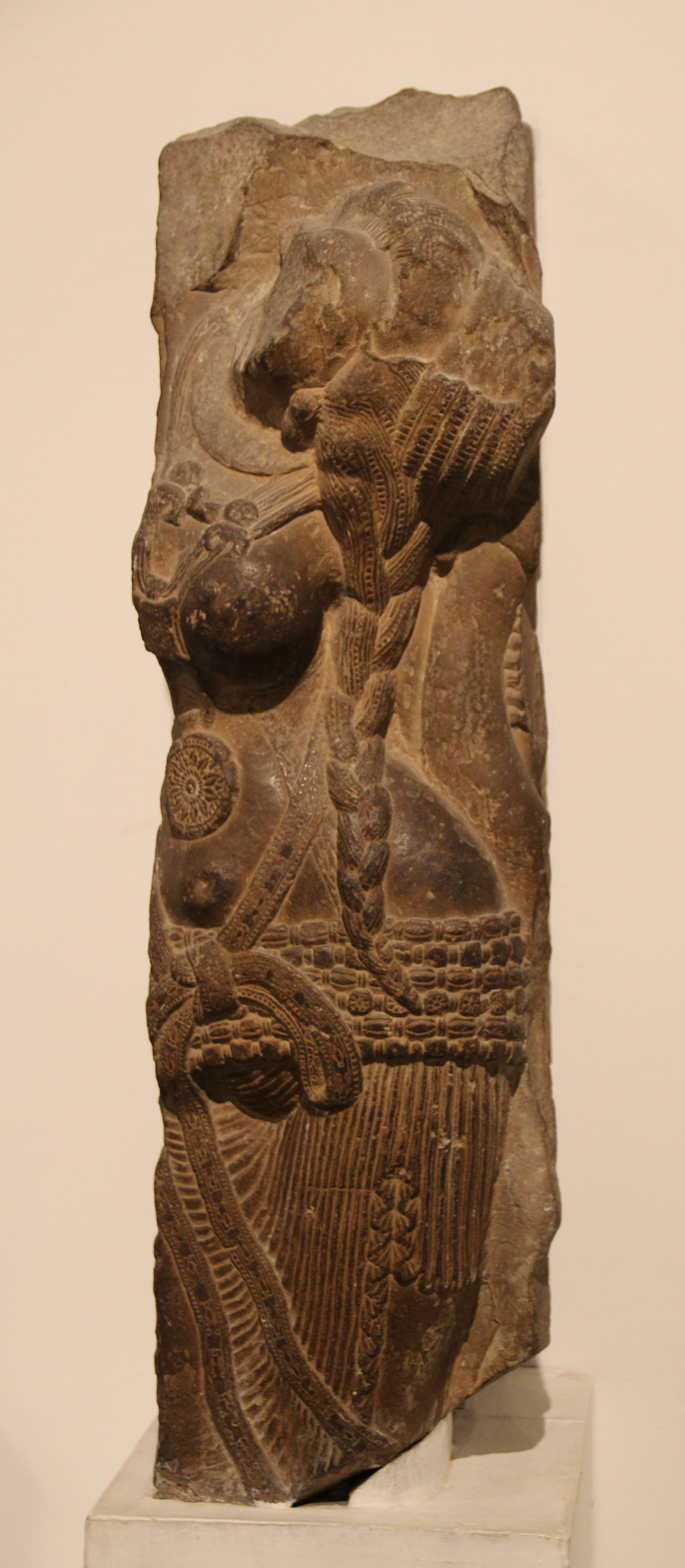
The "Mehrauli Yakshi", dated to 150 BCE, Mathura.

Various reliefs in a style similar to those of Bharhut or Sanchi Stupa No. 2 can be found in Mathura, dating to approximately 150–100 BCE. A dedicatory inscription by Dhanabhuti at Mathura records the donation of railings and a gateway to the Buddhists samgha. It is now lost. The Dhanabhuti in the Mathura inscription could be the same person as King Dhanabhuti in the Bharhut inscription, about 322 kilometers away, and this could suggest some cultural, religious and artistic connection between the two areas. Reliefs are usually rather simple and consist in medallions on railings or balusters, structural elements of stone barriers or "vedikas" probably established around large stupas which have not remained to this day.

The "Mehrauli Yakshi", one of the highest quality work among early sculpture, was found in Mehrauli in the cultural area of Mathura. The high-relief and skillfully carved sculpture shows a female nature divinity, called a Yakshini, holding on the branches of a tree in the Salabhanjika pose, with a long double braid of hair descending down to the girdle. The sculpture probably used to adorn the railing of a sacred site, such as a Stupa. She is dated to 150 BCE, and prefigures by more than a century the Salabhanjika Yakshinis of Sanchi. It is at the same time one of the most artistically beautiful and earliest of the Yakshi sculptures, with detailed patterning contrasting with the smoothness of the skin, standing at the beginning of a long tradition of Yashi sculptures in Mathura and India as a whole. There are many similarities with the Yakshis found in Bharhut, although the Mehrauli Yakshi has rounder volumes, characteristic of the Mathura style and technical proficiency in carving.

Some other sculpted figures also are dated to circa 150 BCE, due to their similarity with equivalent figures in Bharhut. This is the case of a male Chauri-bearer with its sharp lines and stiff expression, held at the Mathura Museum. Sir John Marshall considered the early reliefs of Mathura and Bharhut as part of the same tradition, calling it the "Bharhut-Mathura School", while the reliefs of Sanchi were a second tradition, calling it the "Malwa School of Sanchi".

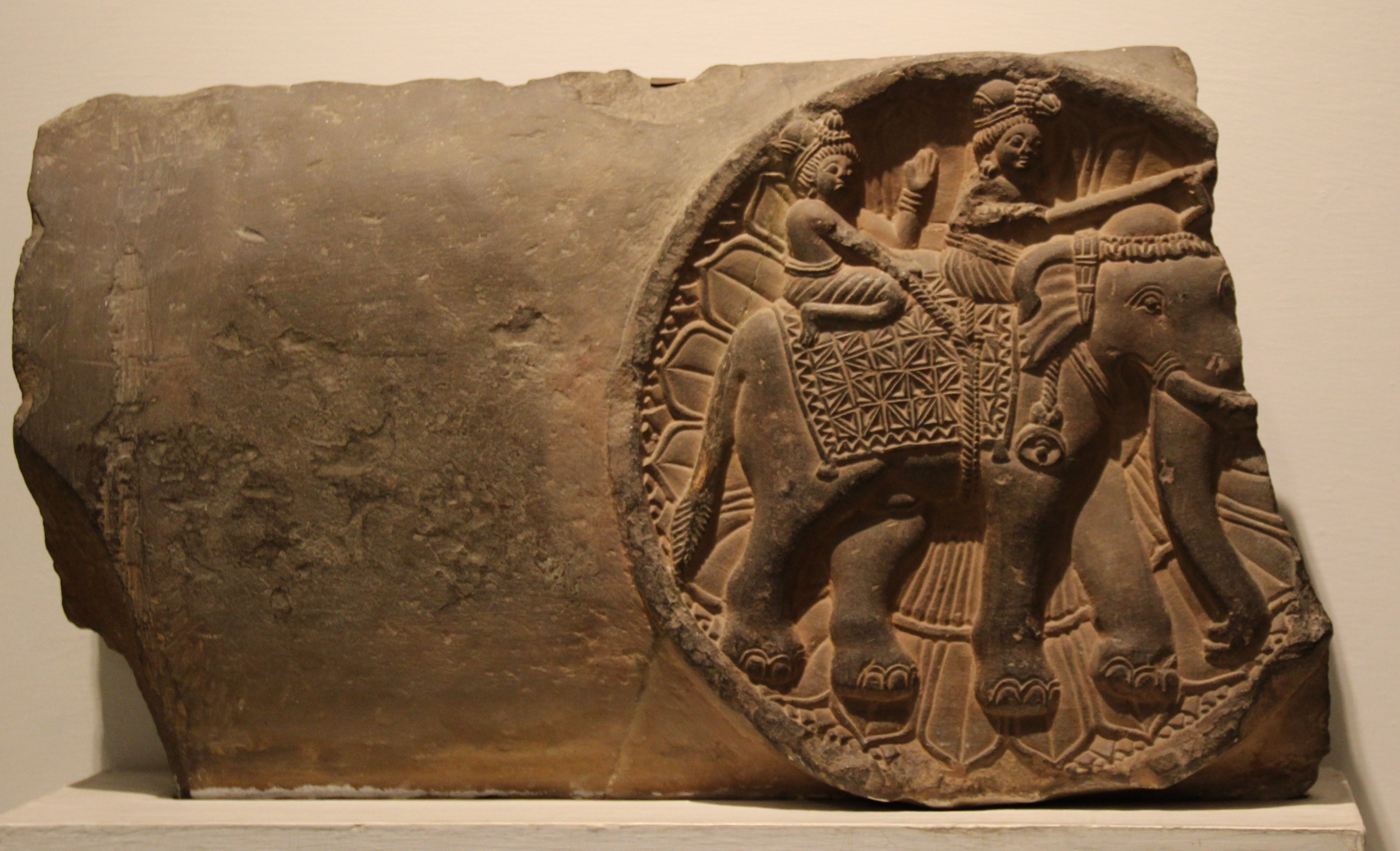
Crossbar medallion with elephant and riders, Gayatri Tila, Mathura, circa 150 BCE.

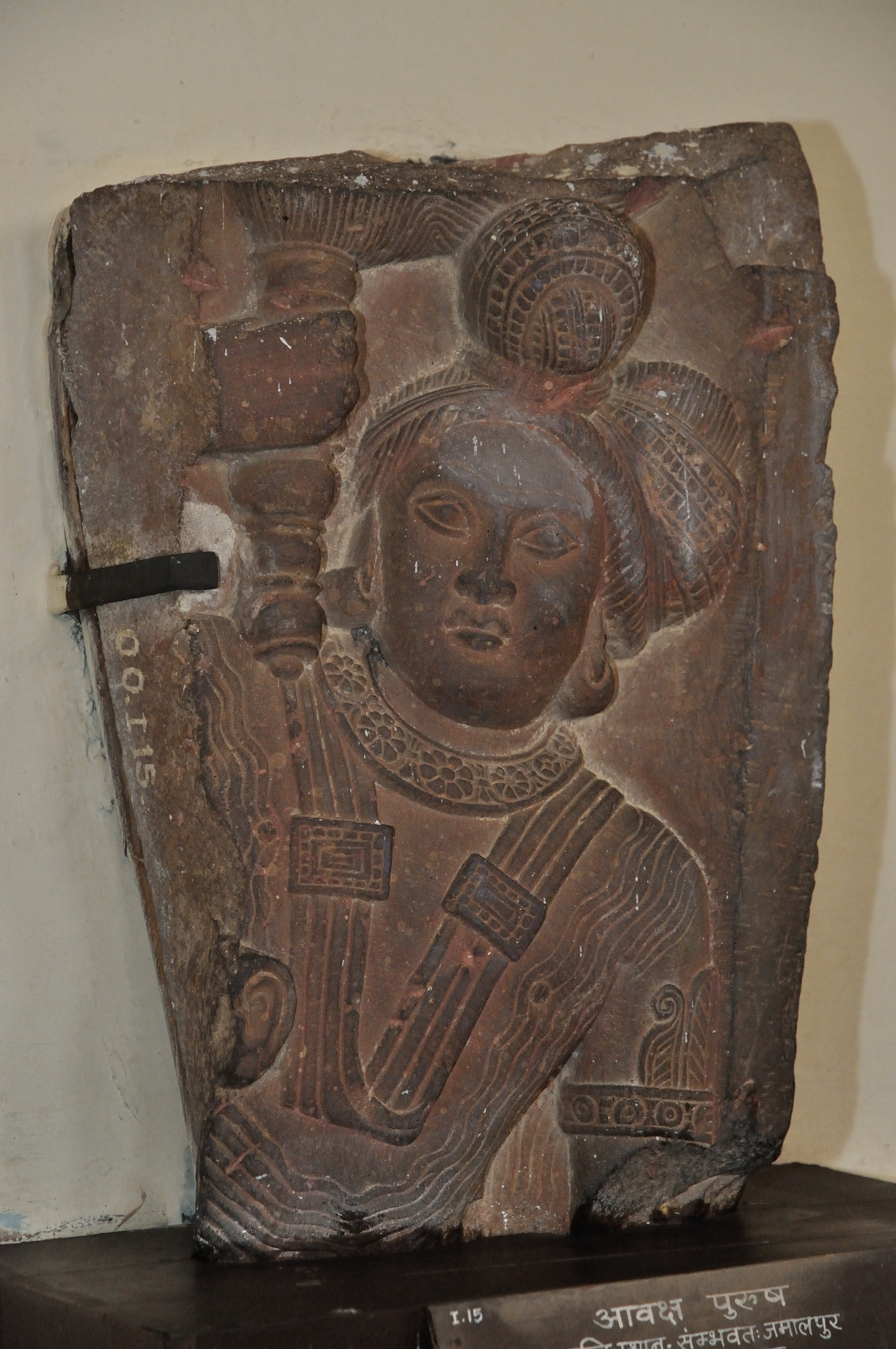
Male Chauri bearer, Mathura, c.150 BCE.

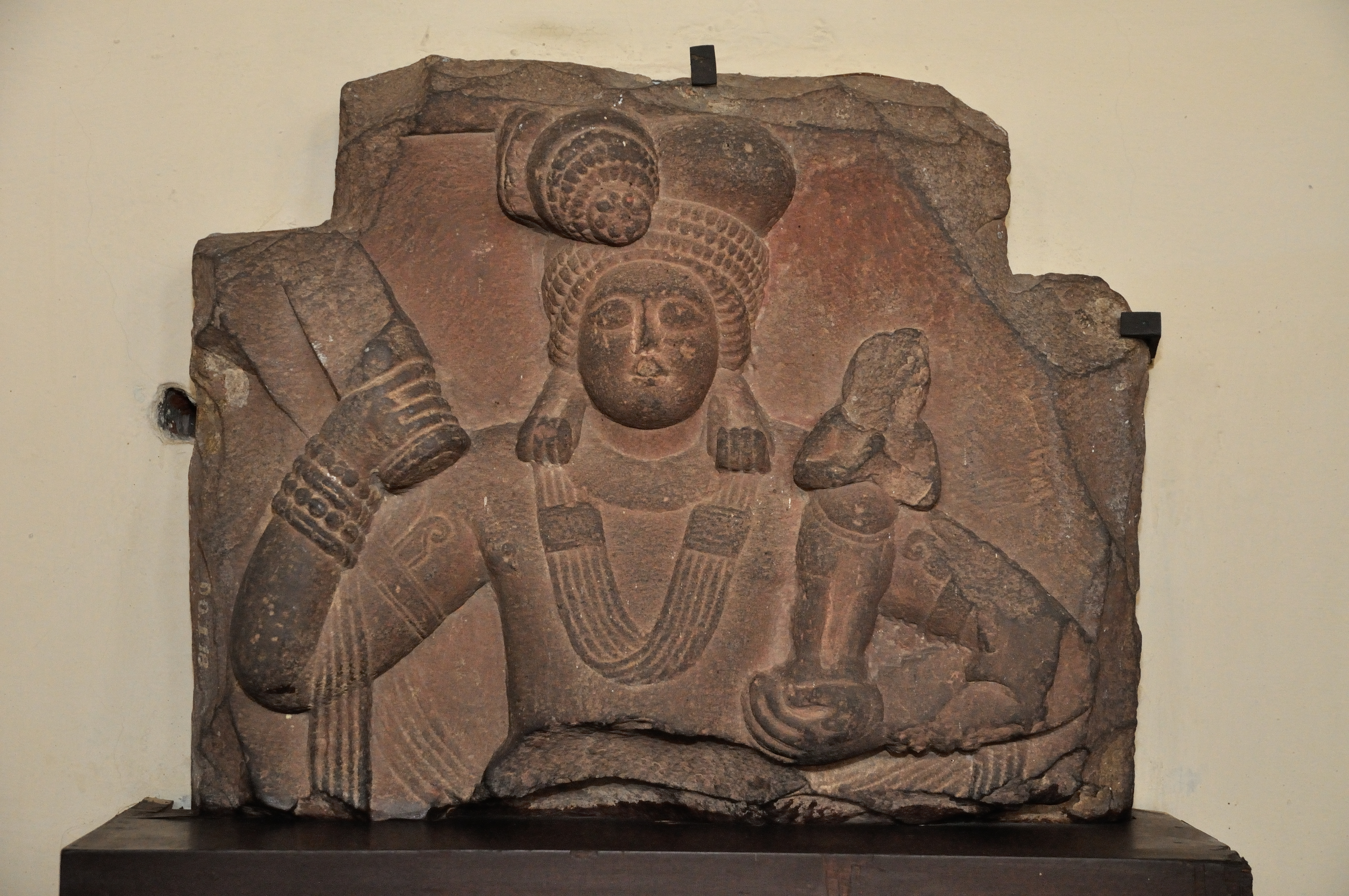
Yaksha holding a mudgar mace and a child. 100 BCE.

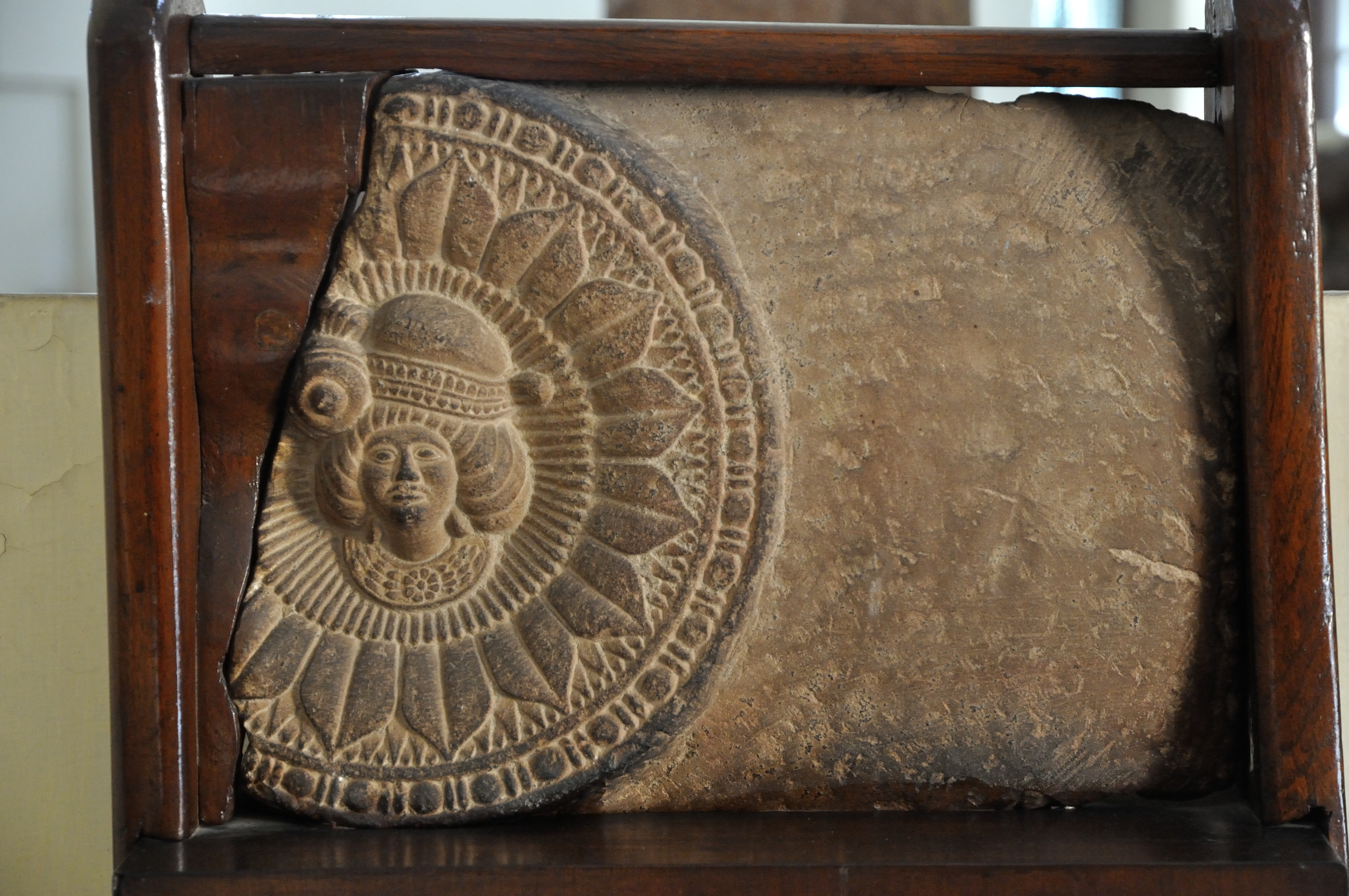
Crossbar with female head in lotus medallion, circa 2nd Century BCE, Mathura.

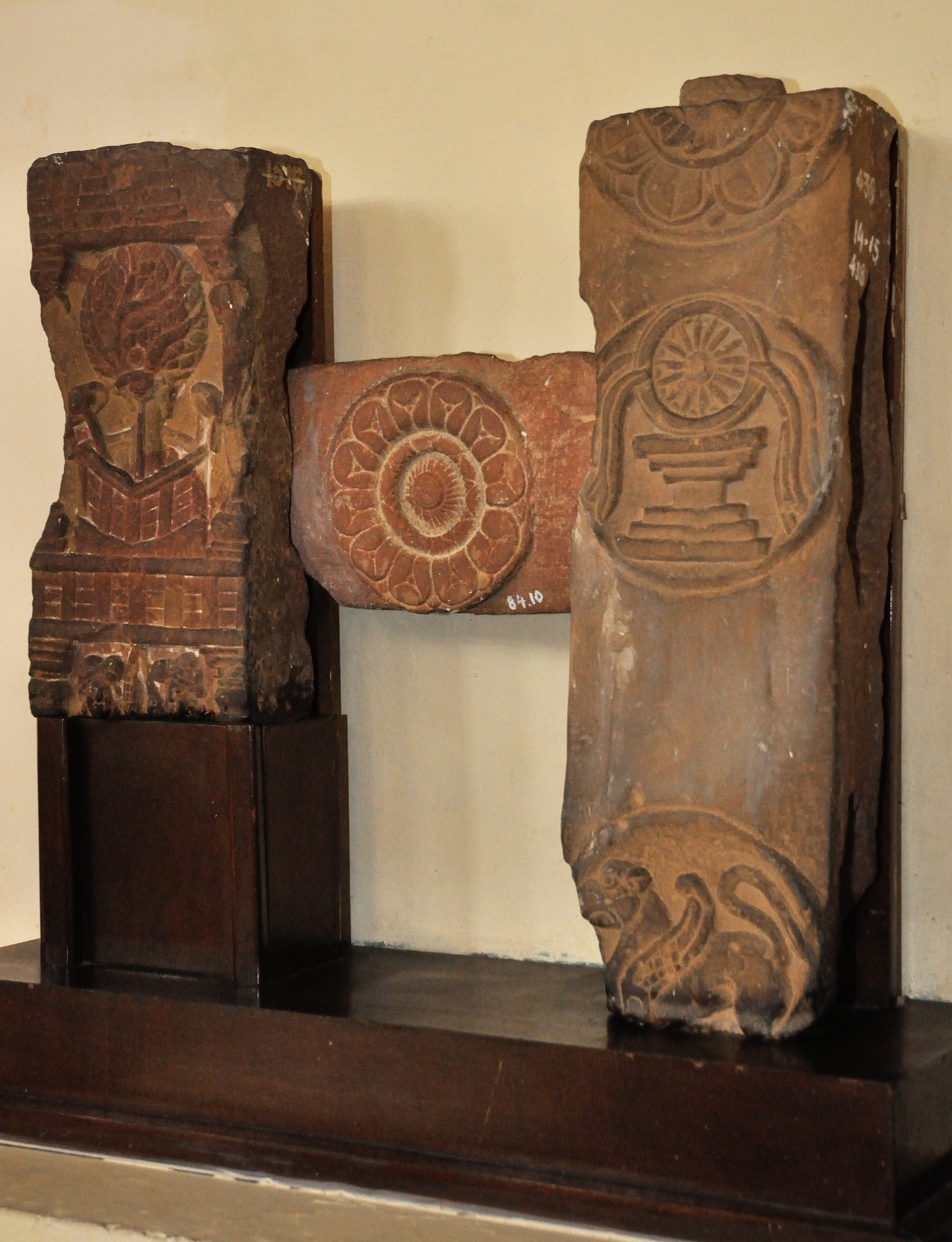
Buddhist railing with Bodhi tree and Wheel of Law. 1st century BCE

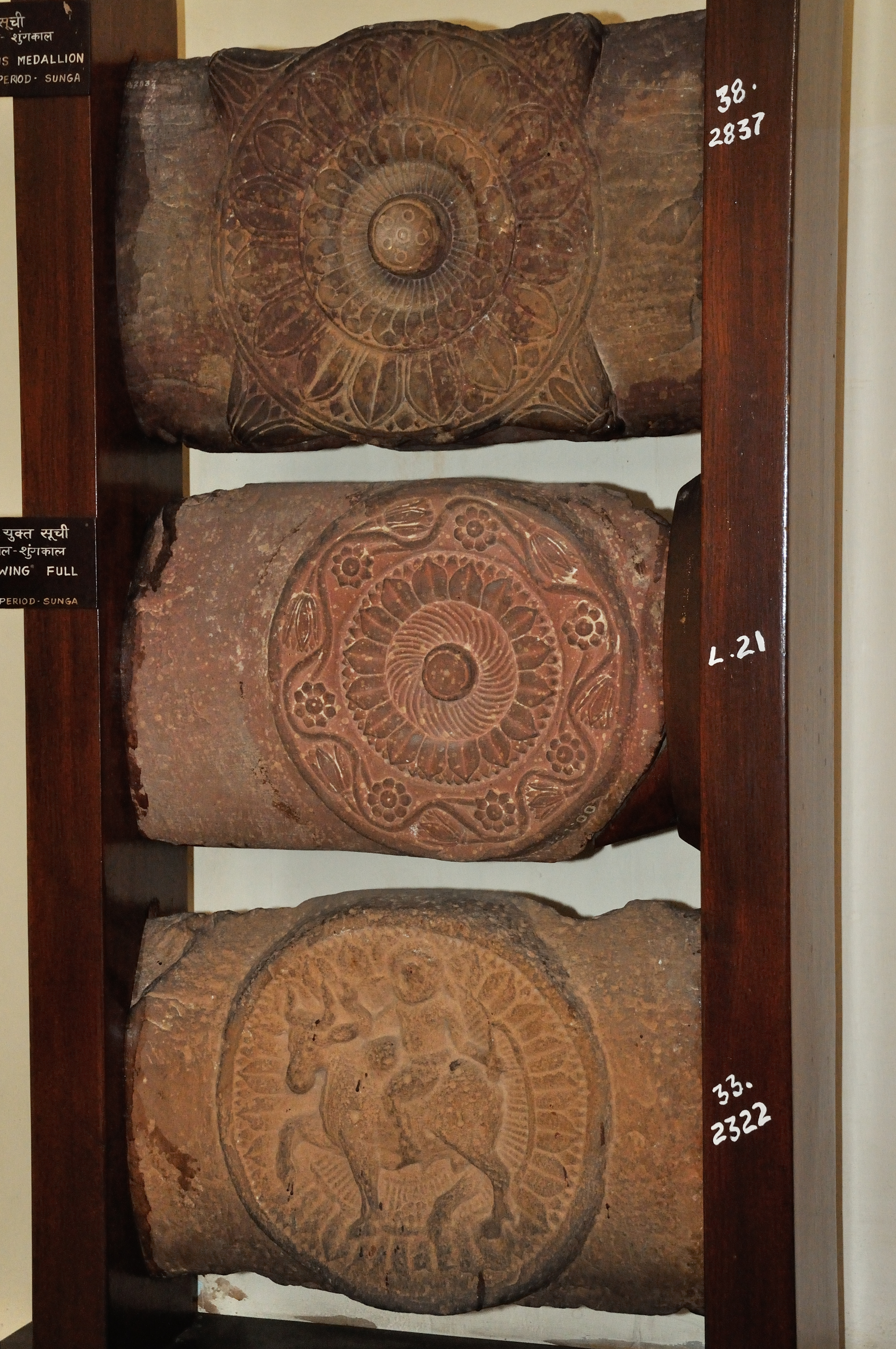
Railing crossbars, 2nd-1st century BCE.

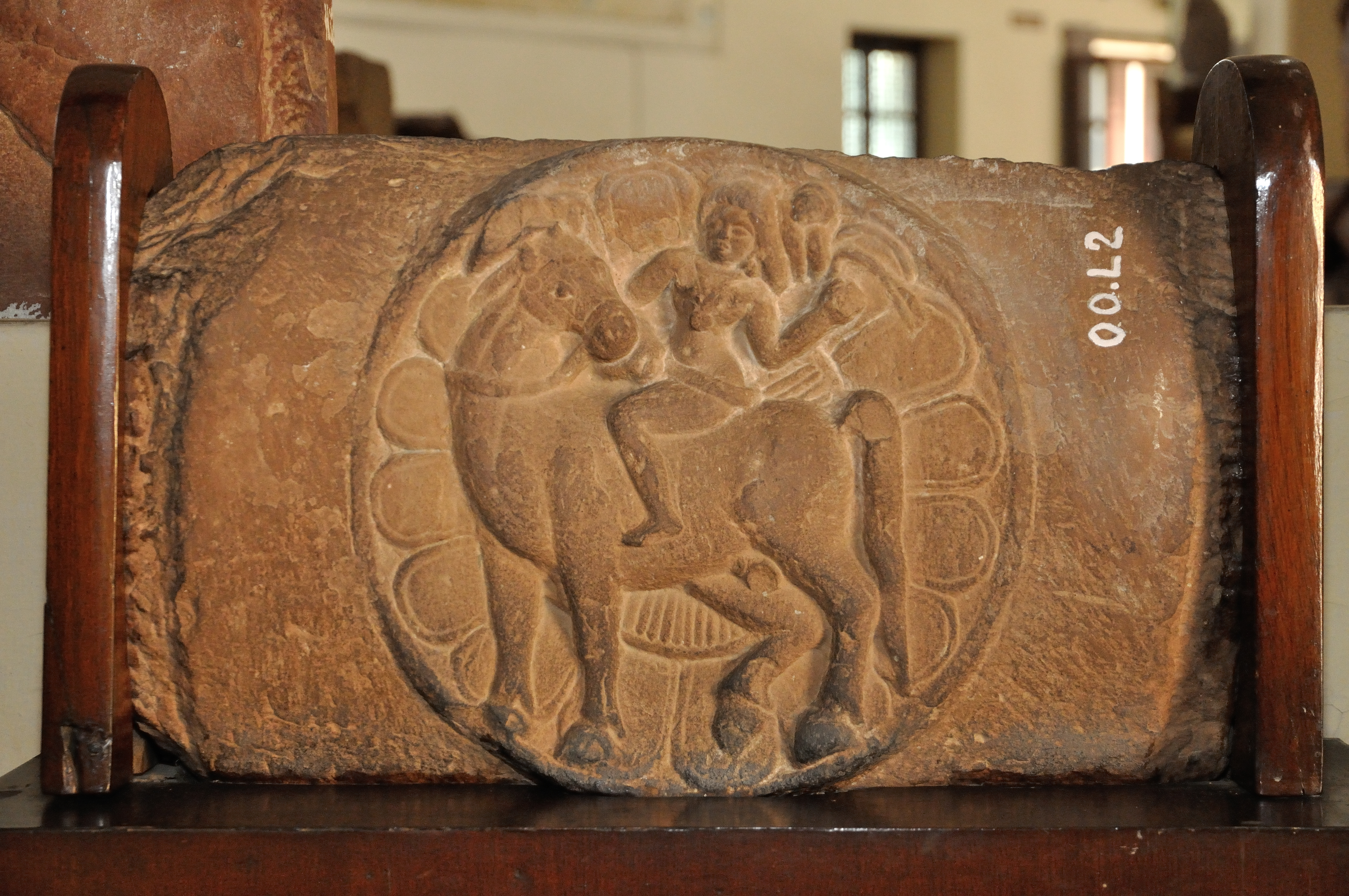
Crossbar medallion with horse rider. 2nd-1st century BCE.

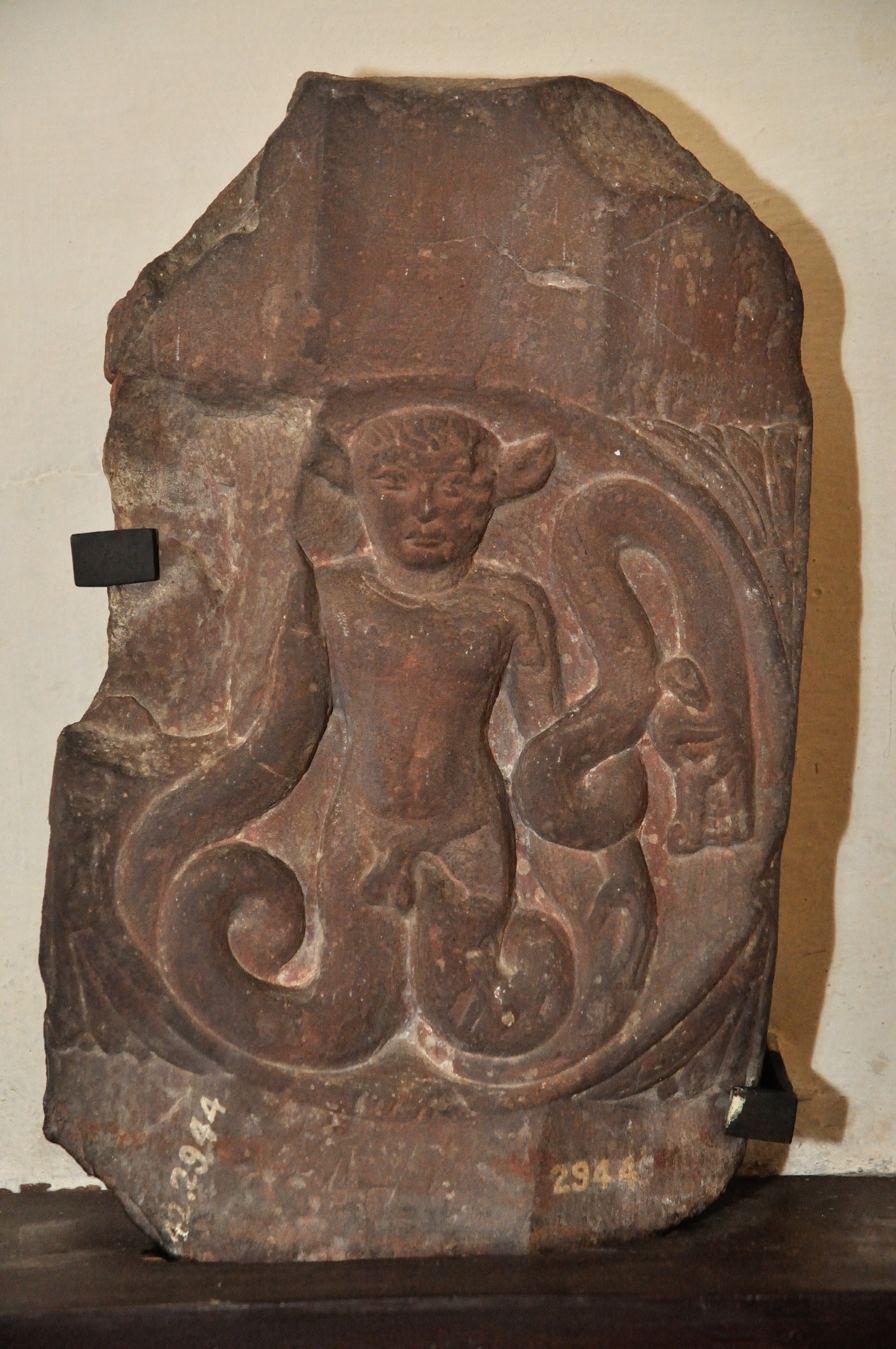
An anguiped, also seen in Hellenistic and Roman art, c. 1st century BCE.

==== Complex narrative reliefs (circa 100 BCE) ====
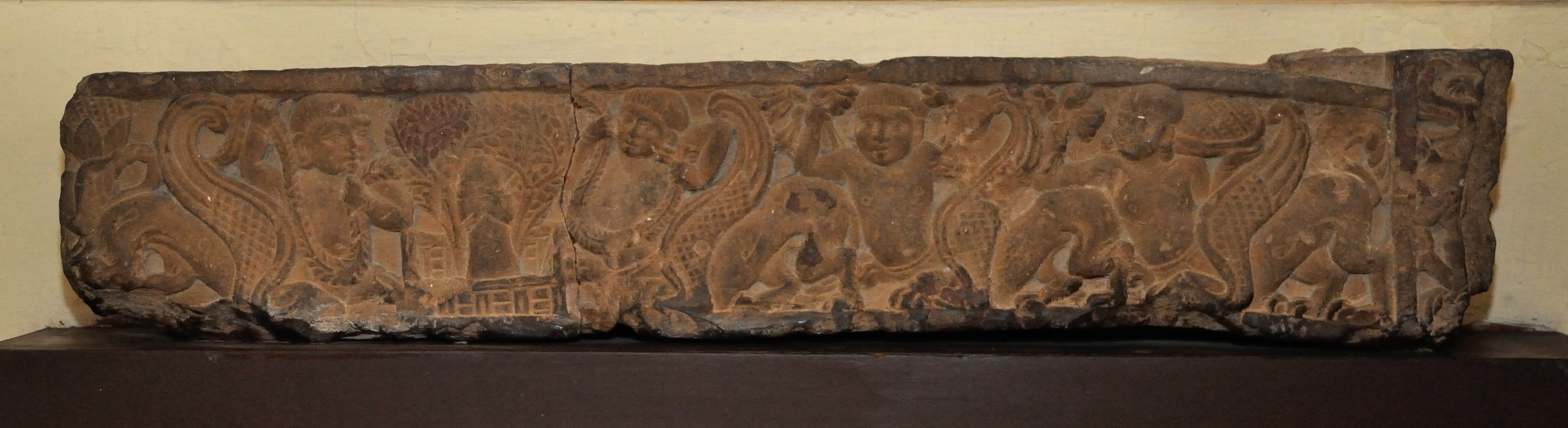
Linga inside a railing (left), being worshipped by Gandharvas winged creatures. Circa 100 BCE.

By 100 BCE, the reliefs represent more complex scenes, defining, according to Sonya Rhie Quintanilla, an age of "iconic diversification and narrative maturation", as shown by the Kankali Tila architrave representing centaurs worshipping a Jain stupa, the dance of Nilanjana, and the renunciation of Rsabhanata, or the Katra architrave representing Brahmins with pots in a sacred precinct. Another relief from the same period shows a Linga inside a railing on platform and under a pipal tree, being worshipped by Gandharvas, an early depiction of the phallic cult in Shivaism.

Several of these reliefs are the first known examples of Jain sculpture. These reliefs show more depth, and a greater richness in their composition. These examples of narrative reliefs, although few remain, are as refined and intricate as the better known narrative reliefs of Bharhut, Sanchi or Amaravati. The centaurs appearing in the Mathura reliefs, as in other places such as Bodh Gaya, are generally considered as Western borrowings.

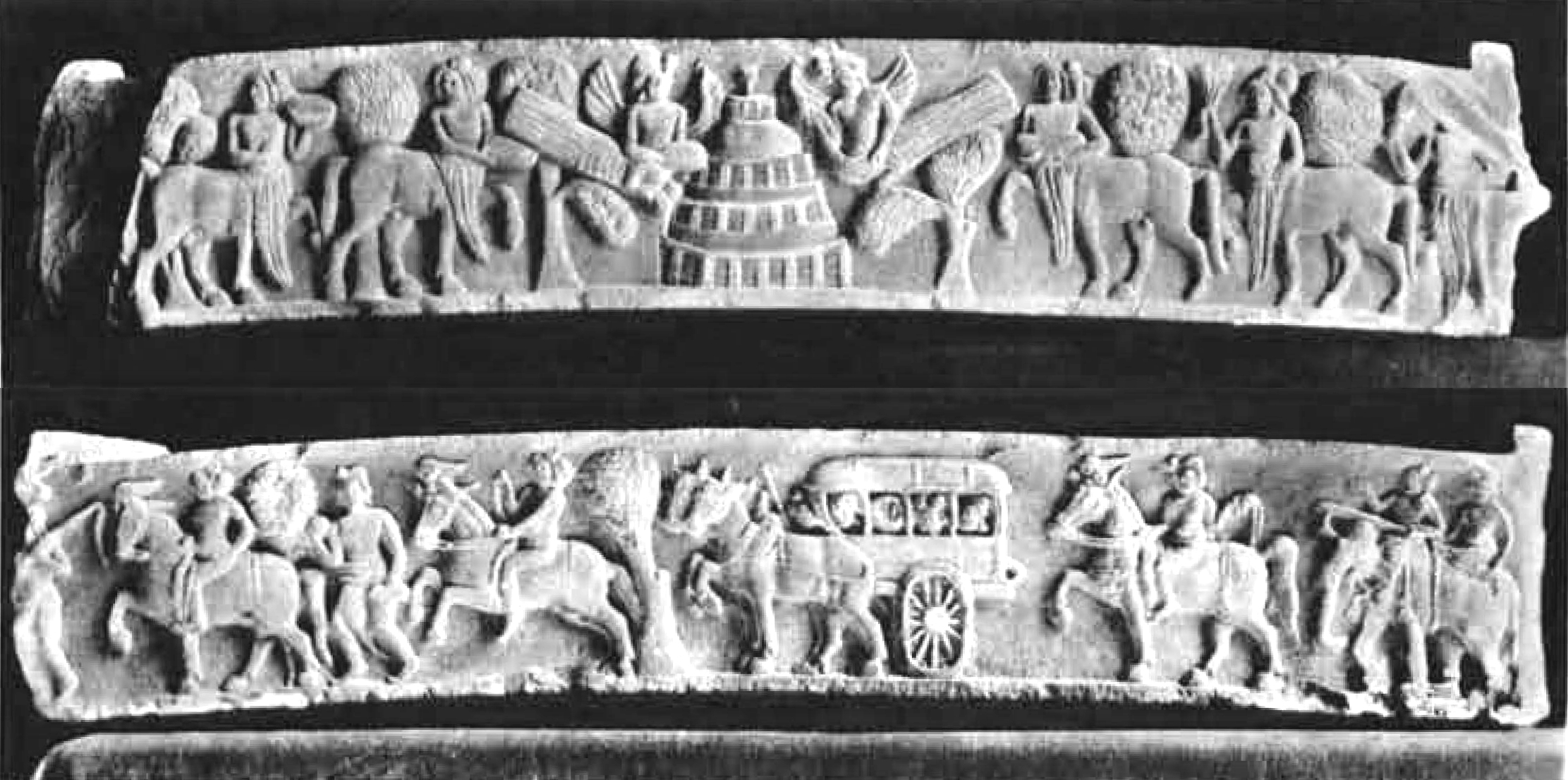
Kankali Tila architrave with Centaurs worshipping a Jain Stupa, Mathura, circa 100 BCE

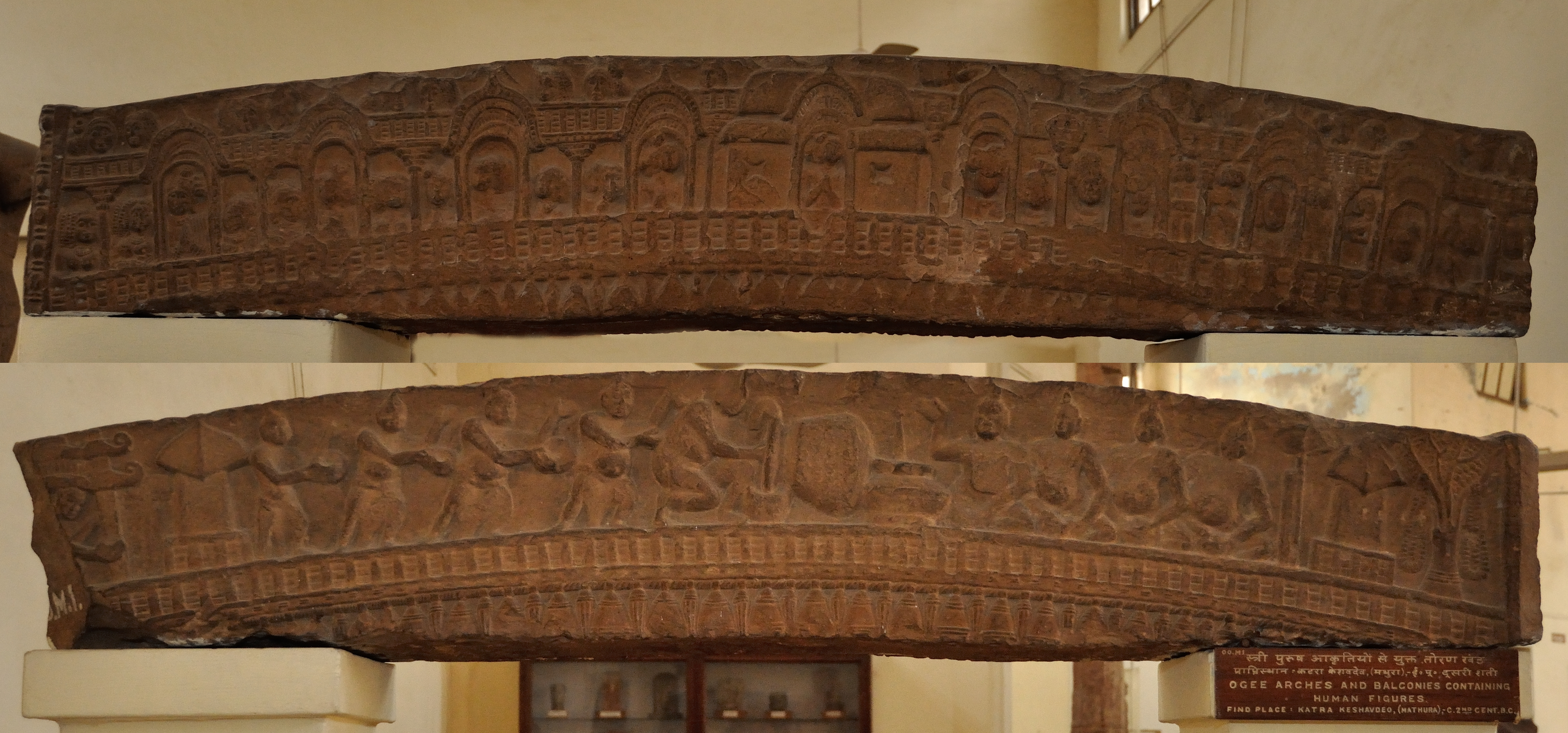
The Katra architrave, possibly representing Brahmins and the cult of the Shiva Linga, Mathura, circa 100 BCE

== Indo-Scythian period (circa 60 BCE–90 CE) ==
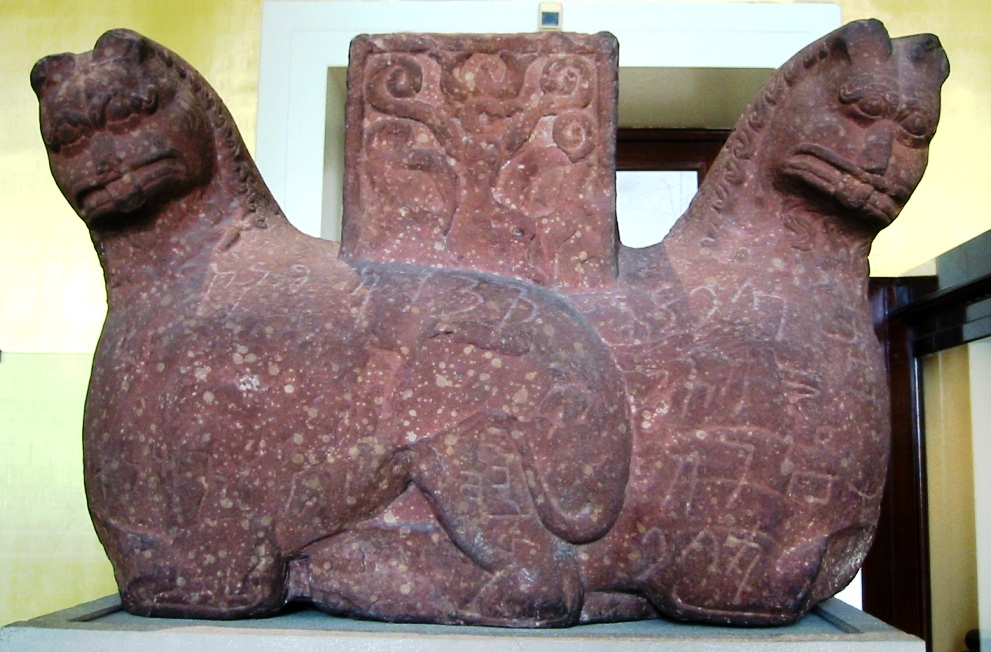
The Mathura lion capital, a dynastic production, advertising the rule of Rajuvula and his relatives, as well as their sponsorship of Buddhism. 2 BCE-6 CE.

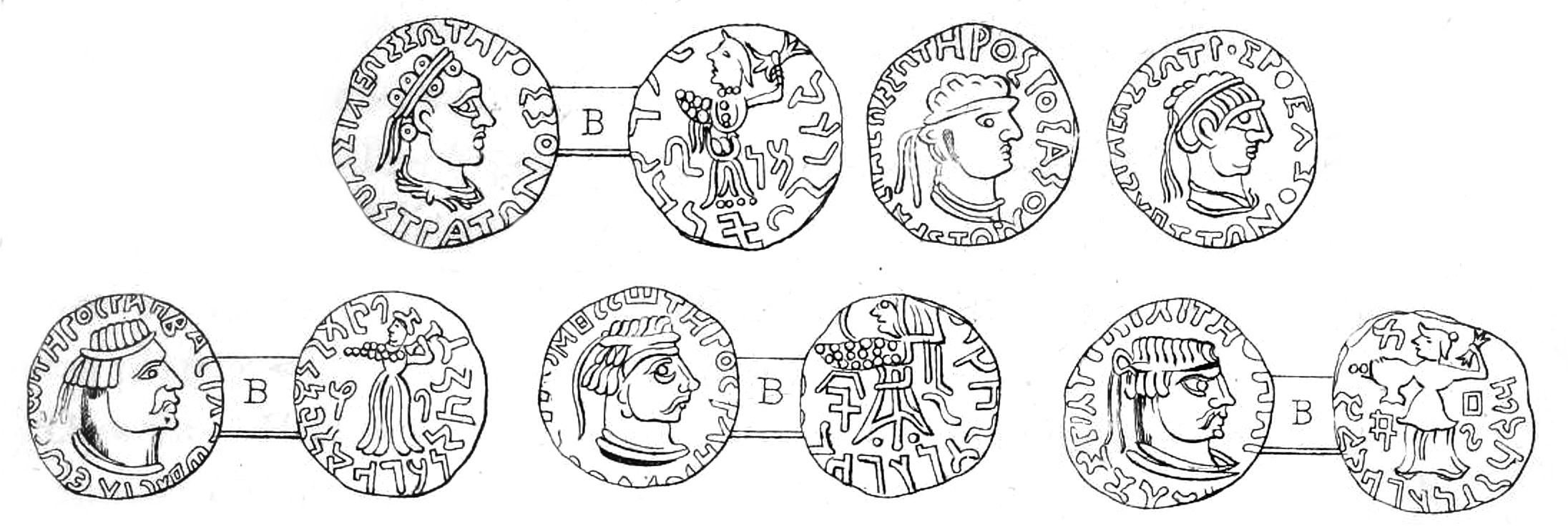
Coins of contemporary Indo-Greek ruler Strato (r.c.25 BCE to 10 CE, top) and Indo-Scythian ruler of Mathura Rajuvula (r.c.10 BCE to 10 CE, bottom) discovered together in a mound in Mathura. The coins of Rajuvula were derived from those of Strato.

From around 70 BCE, the region of Mathura fell to the Indo-Scythian Northern Satraps under Hagamasha, Hagana and then Rajuvula. During this time, Mathura is described as "a great center of Śaka culture in India". Little is known precisely from that period on terms of artistic creation. The Indo-Scythian Rajuvula, ruler of Mathura, created coins which were copies of the contemporary Indo-Greek ruler Strato II, with effigy of the king and representation of Athena on the obverse. Indo-Scythians are known to have sponsored Buddhism, but also other religions, as visible from their inscriptions and archaeological remains in northwestern and western India, as well as from their contributions to pre-Kushana sculpture in Mathura.

=== End of 1st century BCE ===
Some works of art dated to the end of the 1st century BCE show very delicate workmanship, such as the sculptures of Yakshis. A the very end of this period the Indo-Scythian ruler Rajuvula is also known for the famous Mathura lion capital which records events of the Indo-Scythian dynasty as well as their support of Buddhism. It is also an interesting example of the state of artistic attainment in the city of Mathura at the turn of our era. The capital portrays two lions reminiscent of the lions of the Pillars of Ashoka, but in a much cruder style. It also displays at its center a Buddhist triratana symbol, further confirming the involvement of Indo-Scythian rulers with Buddhism. The triratna is contained in a flame palmette, an element of Hellenistic iconography, and an example of Hellenistic influence on Indian art.

The fact that the Mathura lion capital is inscribed in Kharoshthi, a script used in the far northwest around the area of Gandhara, attests to the presence of northwestern artists at that time in Mathura.

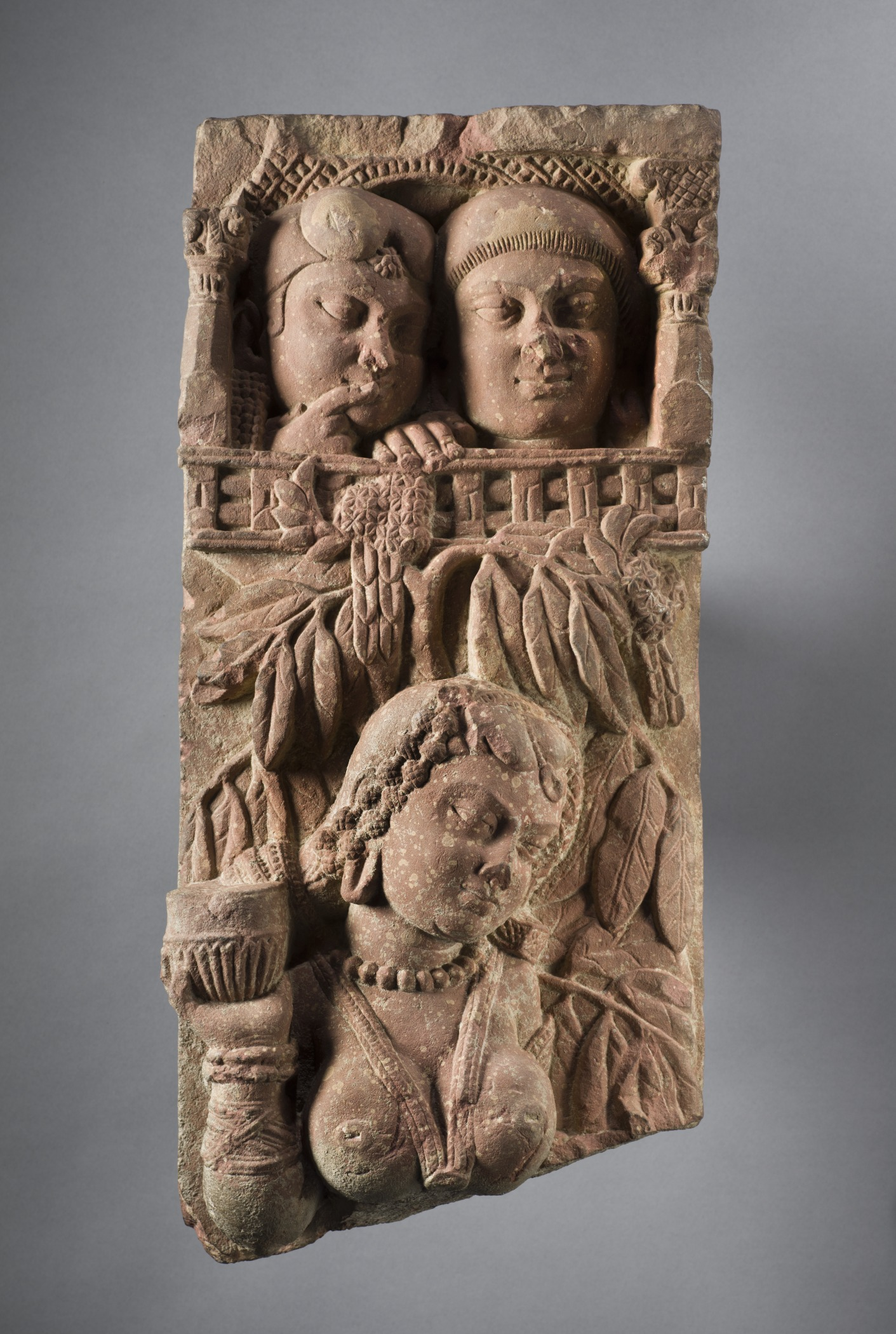
Yakshi with onlookers, dated 20 BCE.

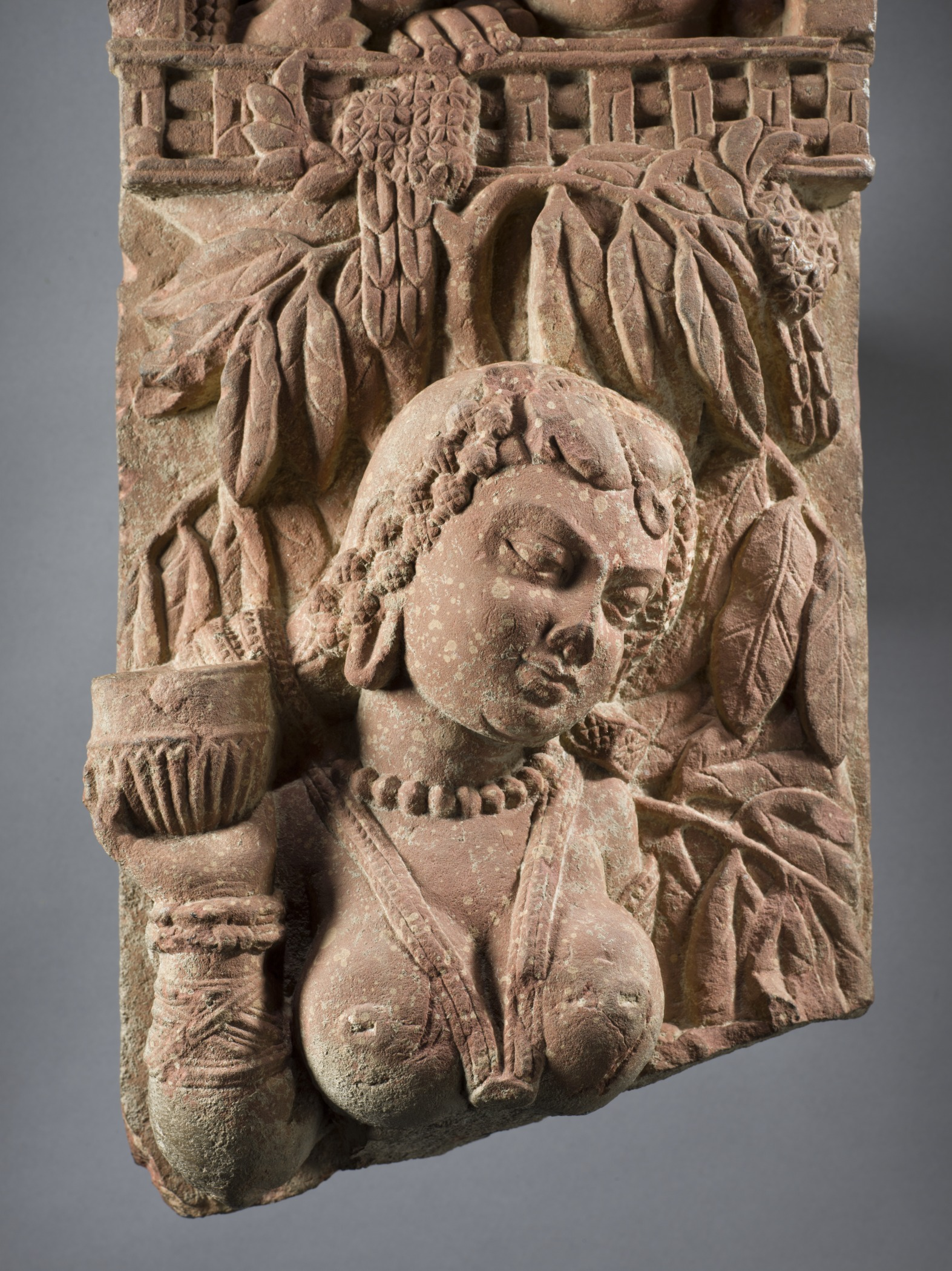
Yakshi with onlookers (detail), dated 20 BCE.

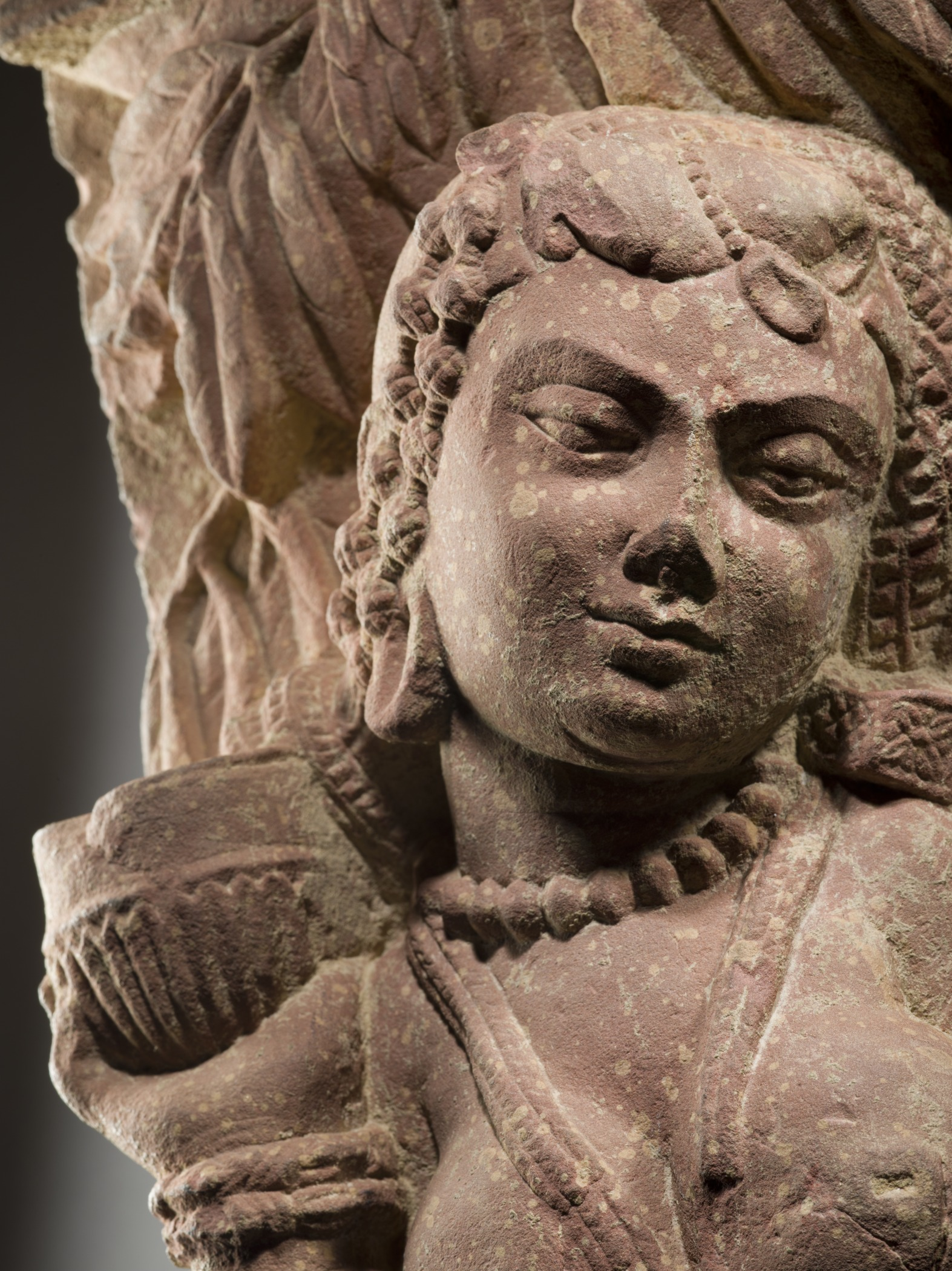
Yakshi with onlookers (detail), dated 20 BCE.

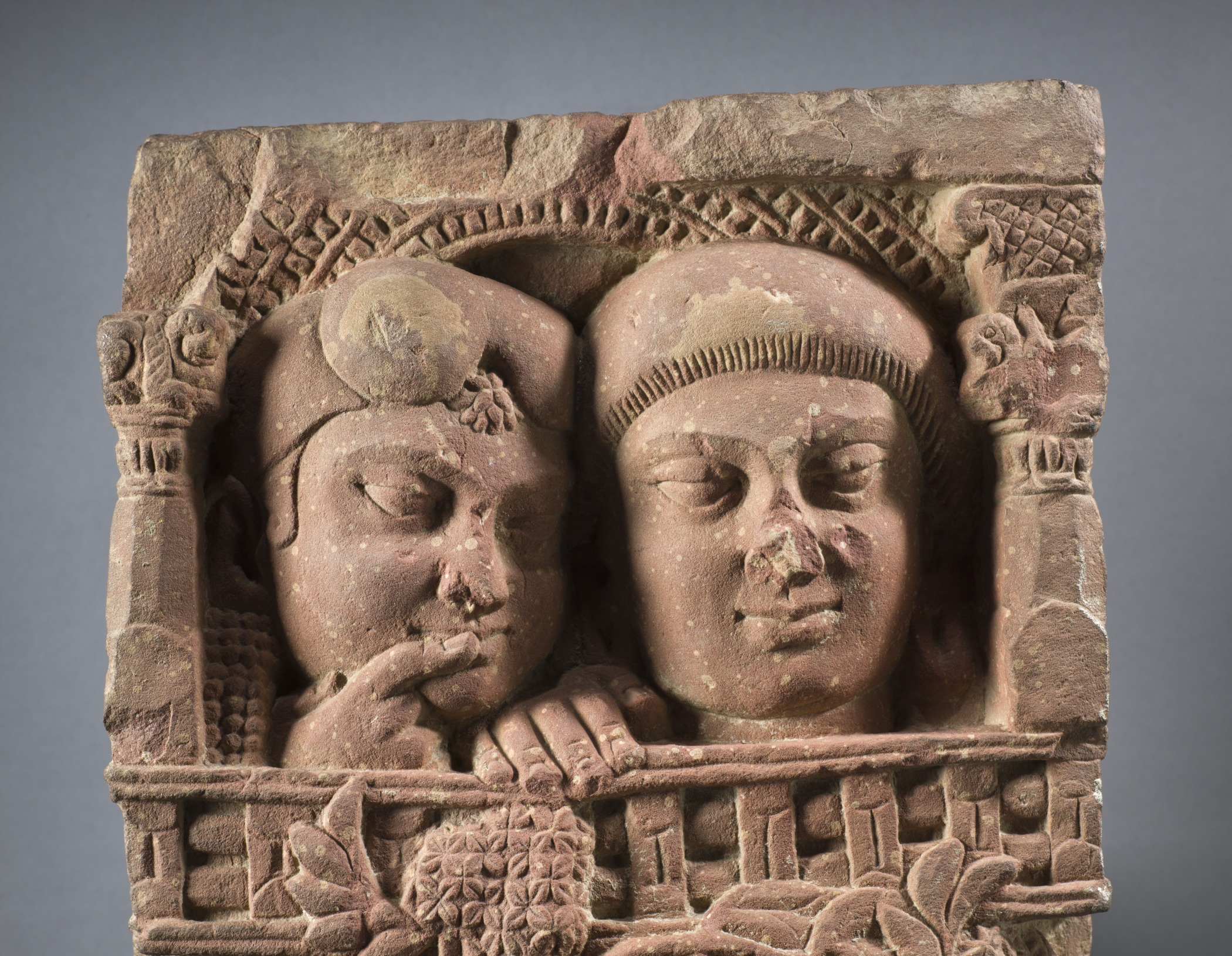
Yakshi with onlookers (detail), dated 20 BCE.

=== Mathura sculpture styles in the 1st century CE ===
The abundance of dedicatory inscriptions in the name of Sodasa, the Indo-Scythian ruler of Mathura, and son of Rajuvula (eight such inscriptions are known, often on sculptural works), and the fact that Sodasa is known through his coinage as well as through his relations with other Indo-Scythian rulers whose dates are known, means that Sodasa functions as a historic marker to ascertain the sculptural styles at Mathura during his rule, in the first half of the 1st century CE. These inscriptions also correspond to some of the first known epigraphical inscriptions in Sanskrit. The next historical marker corresponds to the reign of Kanishka under the Kushans, whose reign began circa 127 CE. The sculptural styles at Mathura during the reign of Sodasa are quite distinctive, and significantly different from the style of the previous period circa 50 BCE, or the styles of the later period of the Kushan Empire in the 2nd century CE.

==== In-the-round statuary ====
Mora sculptures (c. 15 CE)
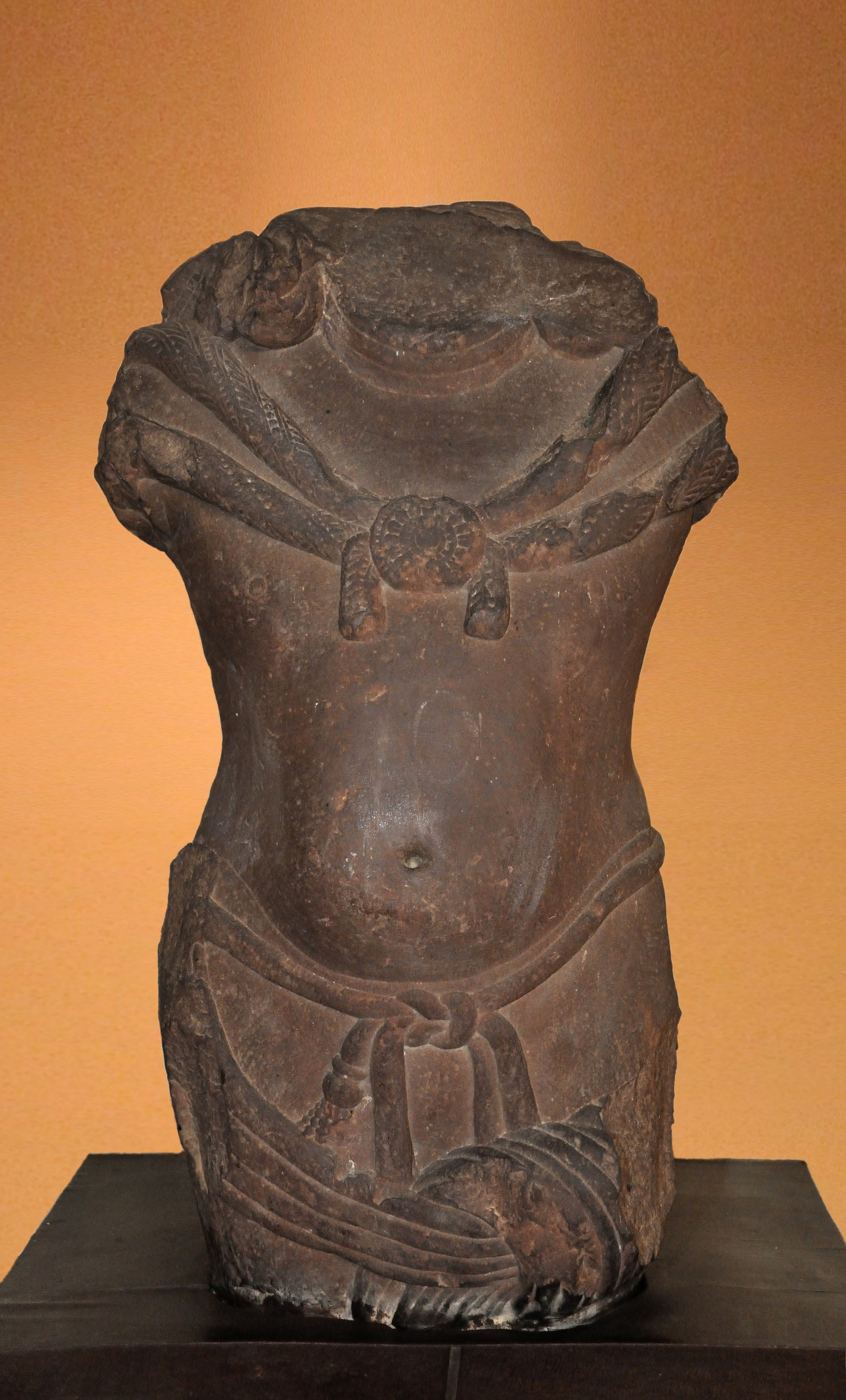
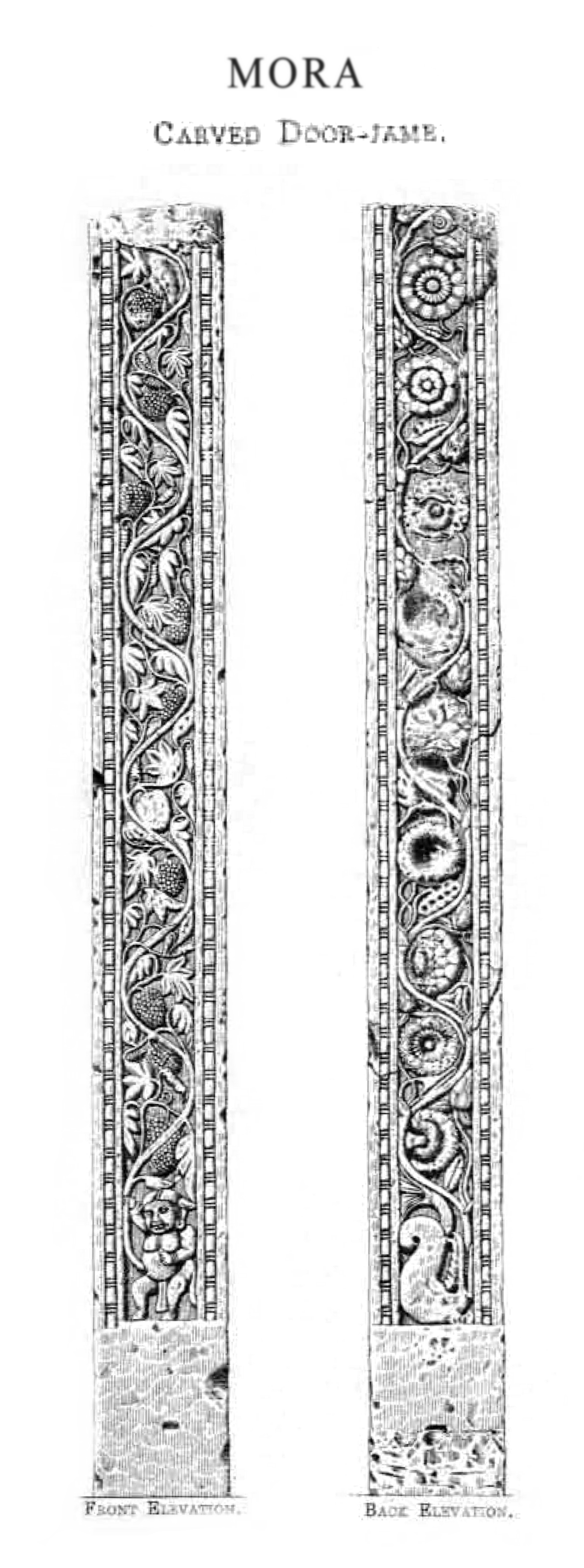
The Mora well inscription of Great Satrap Sodasa (15 CE) is associated with three statue remains and a decorated doorjamb, all thought to be related to a temple built for the Vrishni heroes. Left: torso said to be probably a figure of one of the five Vrishni heroes, Mora, circa 15 CE, Mathura Museum. Right: Mora carved doorjamb with grapevine design, also circa 15 CE.

Several examples of in-the-round statuary have been found from the period of Sodasa, such as the torsos of "Vrishni heroes", discovered in Mora, about 7 kilometers west of Mathura. These statues are mentioned in the Mora Well Inscription nearby, made in the name of the Northern Satraps Sodasa circa 15 CE, in which they are called Bhagavatam. The statue fragments are thought to represent some of the five Vrishni heroes, possibly ancient kings of Mathura later assimilated to Vishnu and his avatars, or, equally possible, the five Jain heroes led by Akrūra, which are well attested in Jain texts. In fact, the cult of the Vrishnis may have been cross-sectarian, much like the cult of the Yakshas.

The two uninscribed male torsos that were discovered are both of high craftsmanship and in Indian style and costume. They are bare-chested but wear a thick necklace, as well as heavy hearrings. The two torsos that were found are similar with minor variations, suggesting they may have been part of a series, which is coherent with the Vrishni interpretation. They share some sculptural characteristics with the Yaksha statues found in Mathura and dating to the 2nd and 1st century BCE, such as the sculpting in the round, or the clothing style, but the actual details of style and workmanship clearly belong to the time of Sodasa. The Vrishni statues also are not of the colossal type, as they would only have stood about 1.22 meters complete. The Mora Vrishnis function as an artistic benchmark for in-the-round statues of the period.

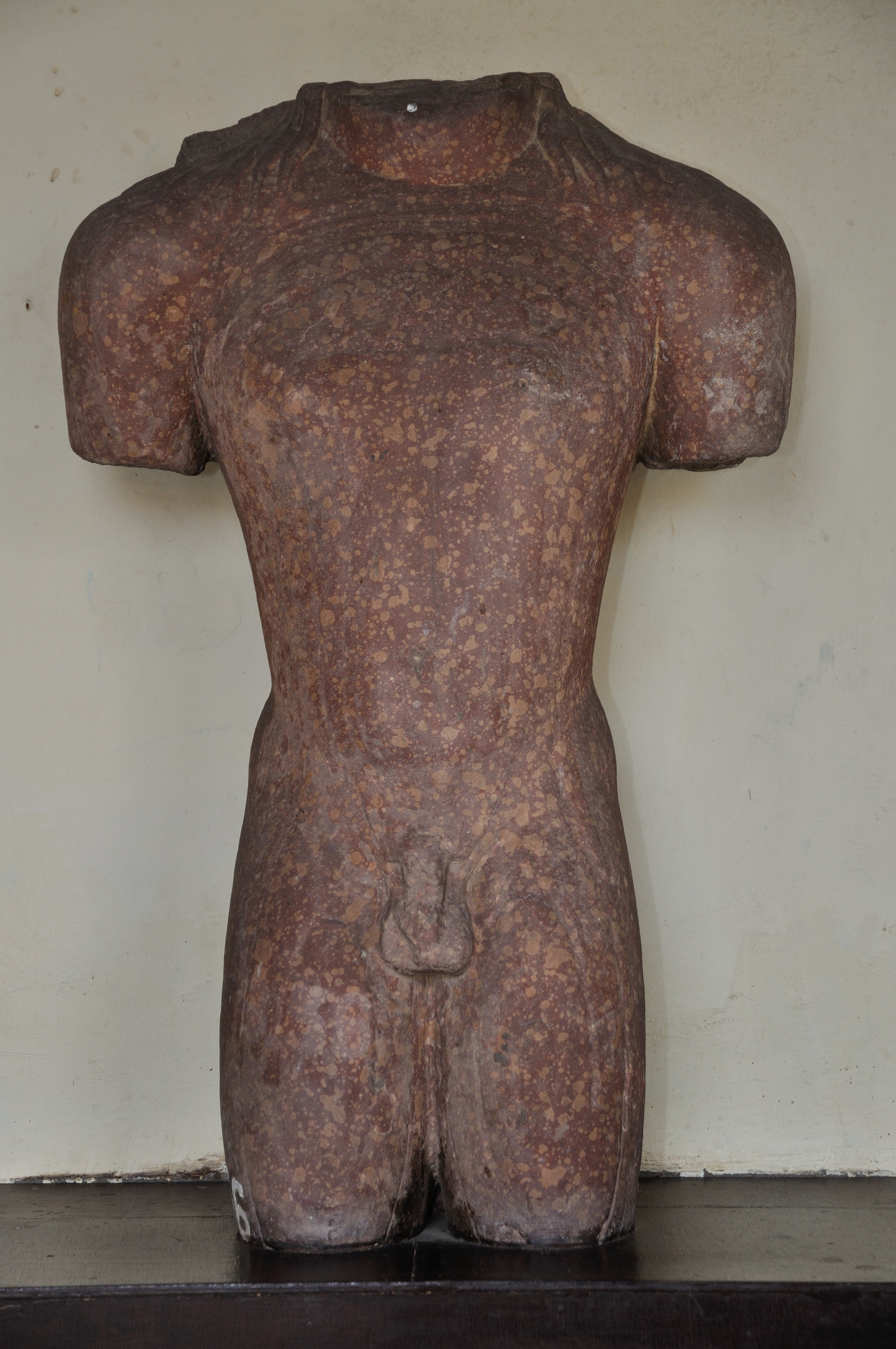
1st Jaina Tirthankara Rishabhanatha torso - Circa 1st Century

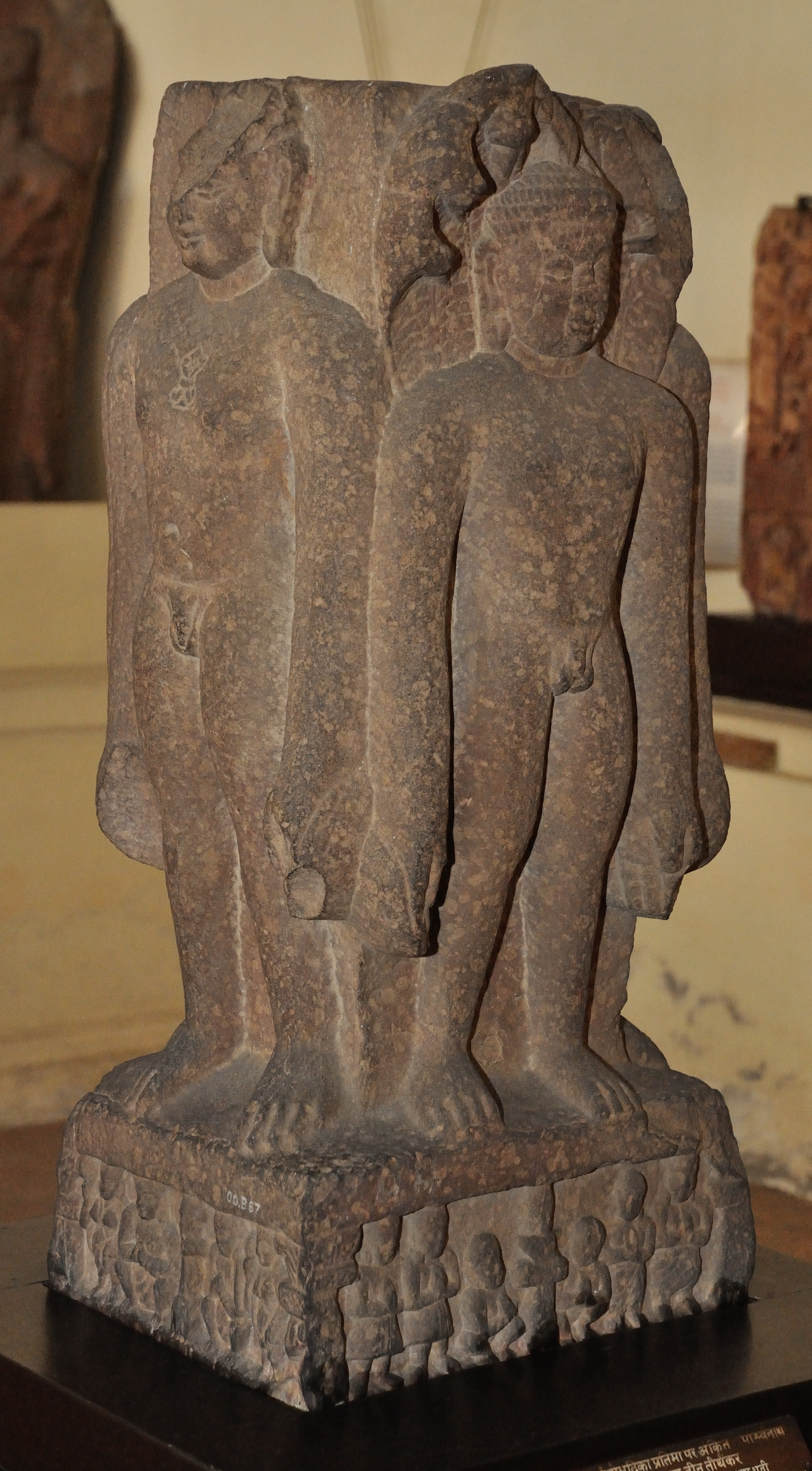
Four-fold Jain image with Suparshvanath and three other Tirthankaras - Circa 1st Century CE

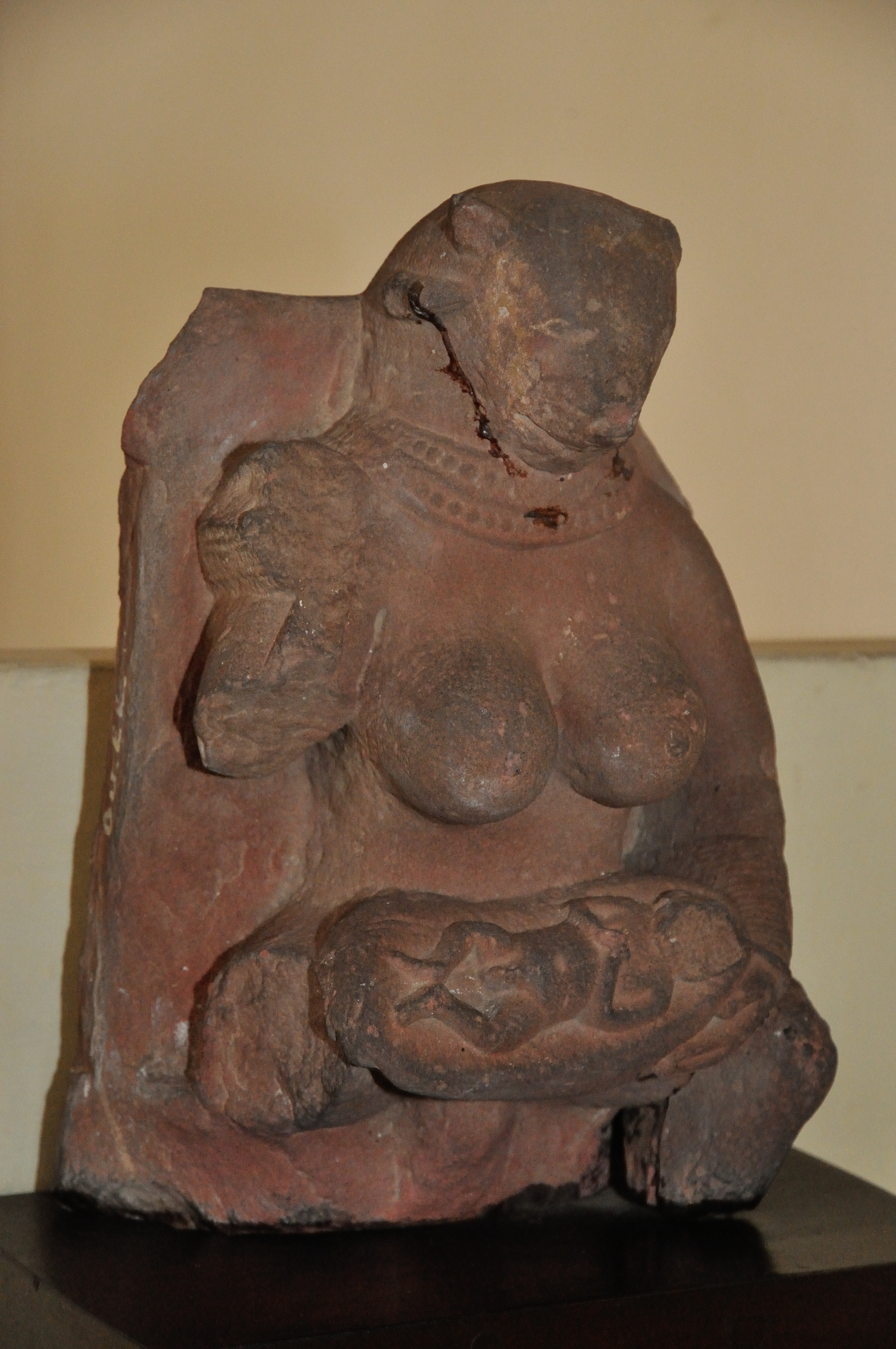
Goat-headed Jain Mother Goddess, circa 1st Century CE

==== Jain reliefs ====
Kankali Tila tablet of Sodasa

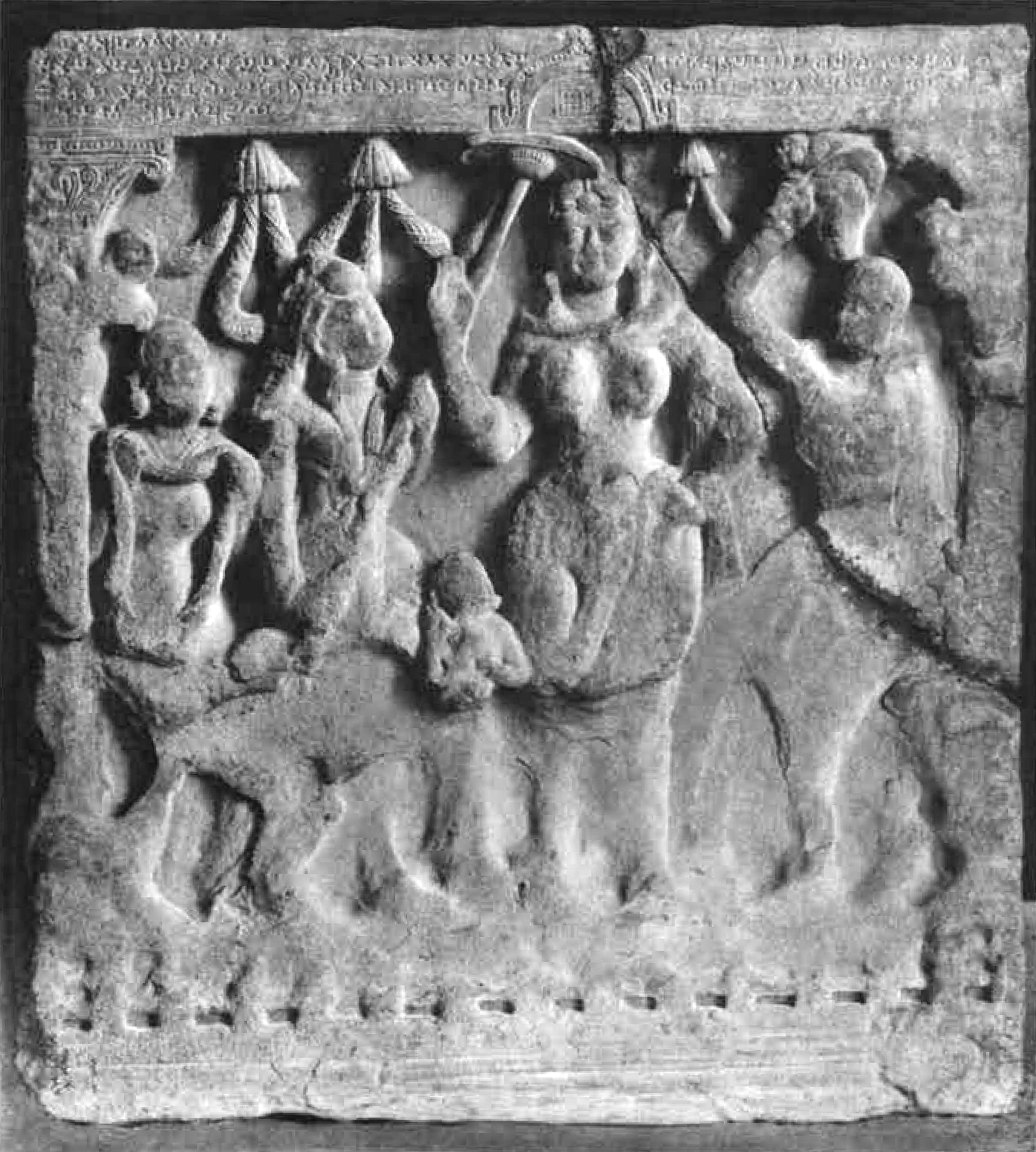
Jain Kankali Tila tablet of Sodasa or "Amohini relief", inscribed "in the reign of Sodasa", circa 15 CE. State Museum Lucknow, SML J.1

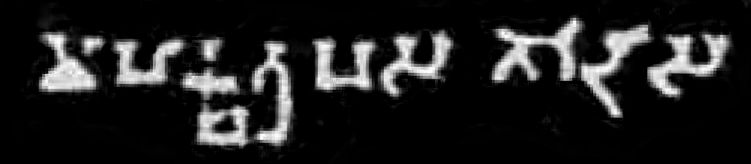
Brahmi inscription in the tablet:

Mahakṣatrapasya Śodāsa
"Great Satrap Sodasa"

Many of the sculptures from this period are related to the Jain religion, with numerous relief showing devotional scenes, such as the Kankali Tila tablet of Sodasa in the name of Sodasa. Most of these are votive tablets, called ayagapata.

Jain votive plates, called "Ayagapatas", are numerous, and some of the earliest ones have been dated to circa 50–20 BCE. They were probably prototypes for the first known Mathura images of the Buddha. Many of them were found around the Kankali Tila Jain stupa in Mathura.

Notable among the design motifs in the ayagapatas are the pillar capitals displaying "Persian-Achaemenian" style, with side volutes, flame palmettes, and recumbent lions or winged sphinxes.

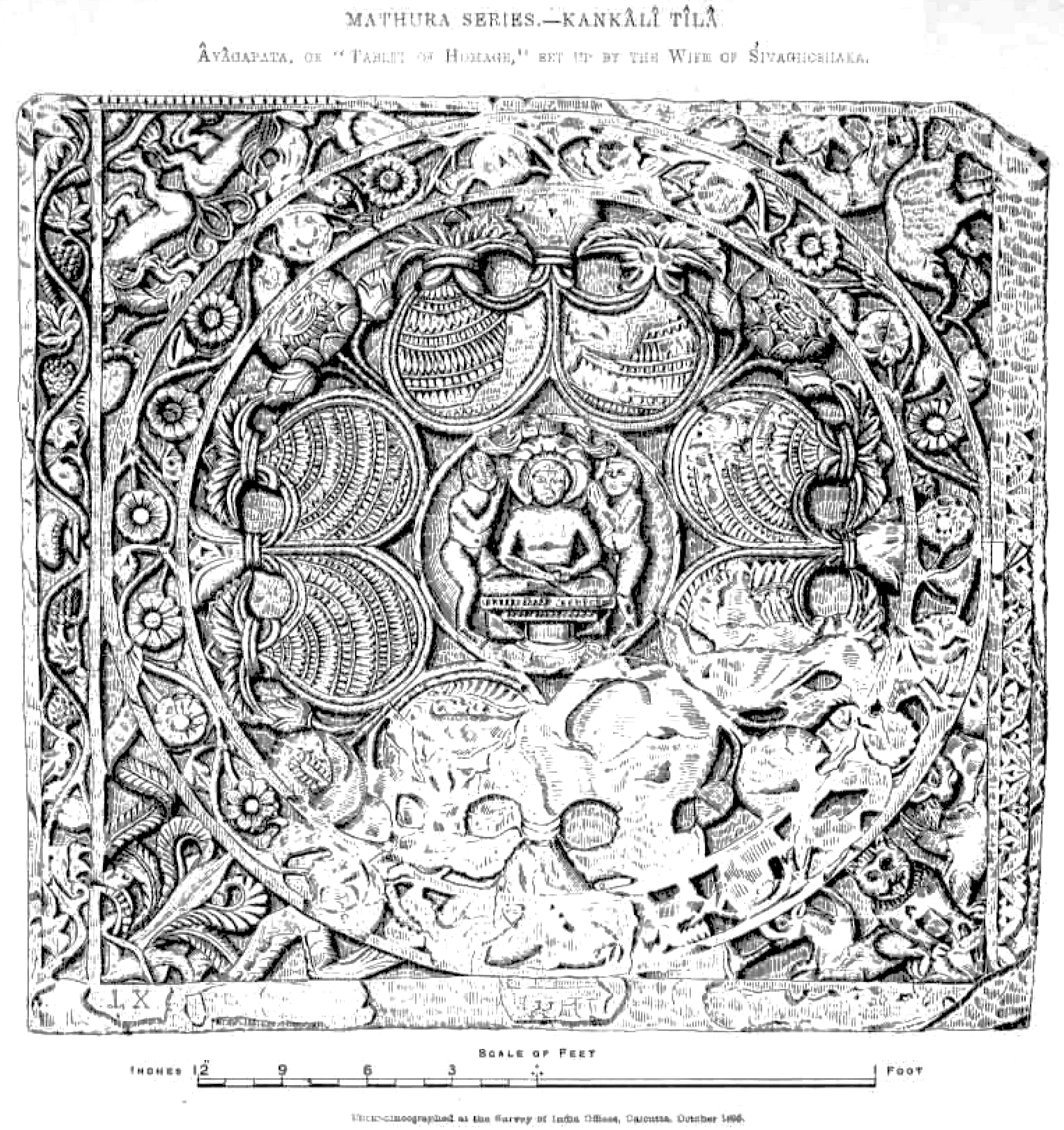
The Jina Parsvanatha ayagapata, Mathura circa 15 CE, Lucknow Museum.

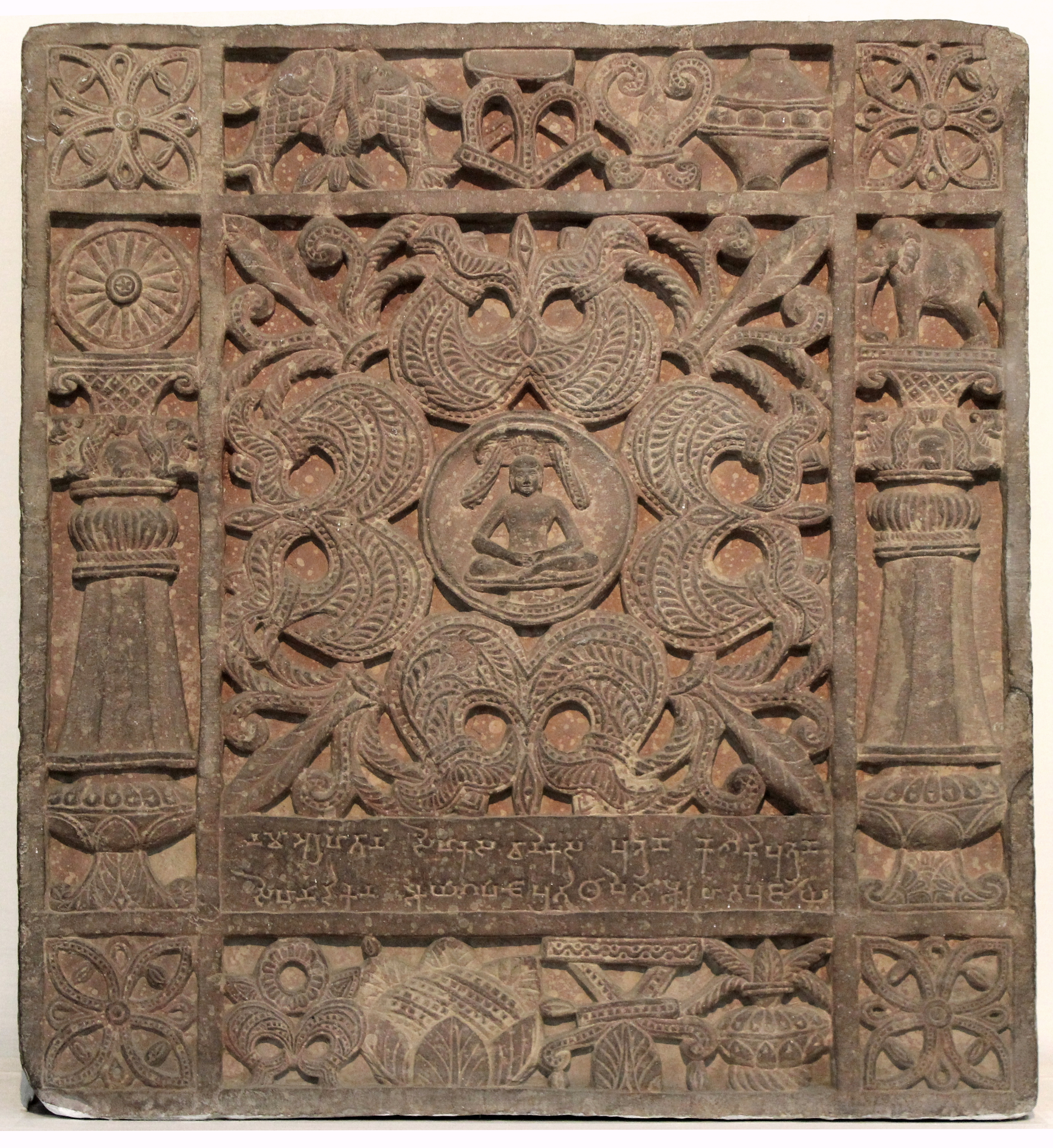
"Sihanāṃdikā ayagapata", Jain votive plate, dated 25-50 CE.

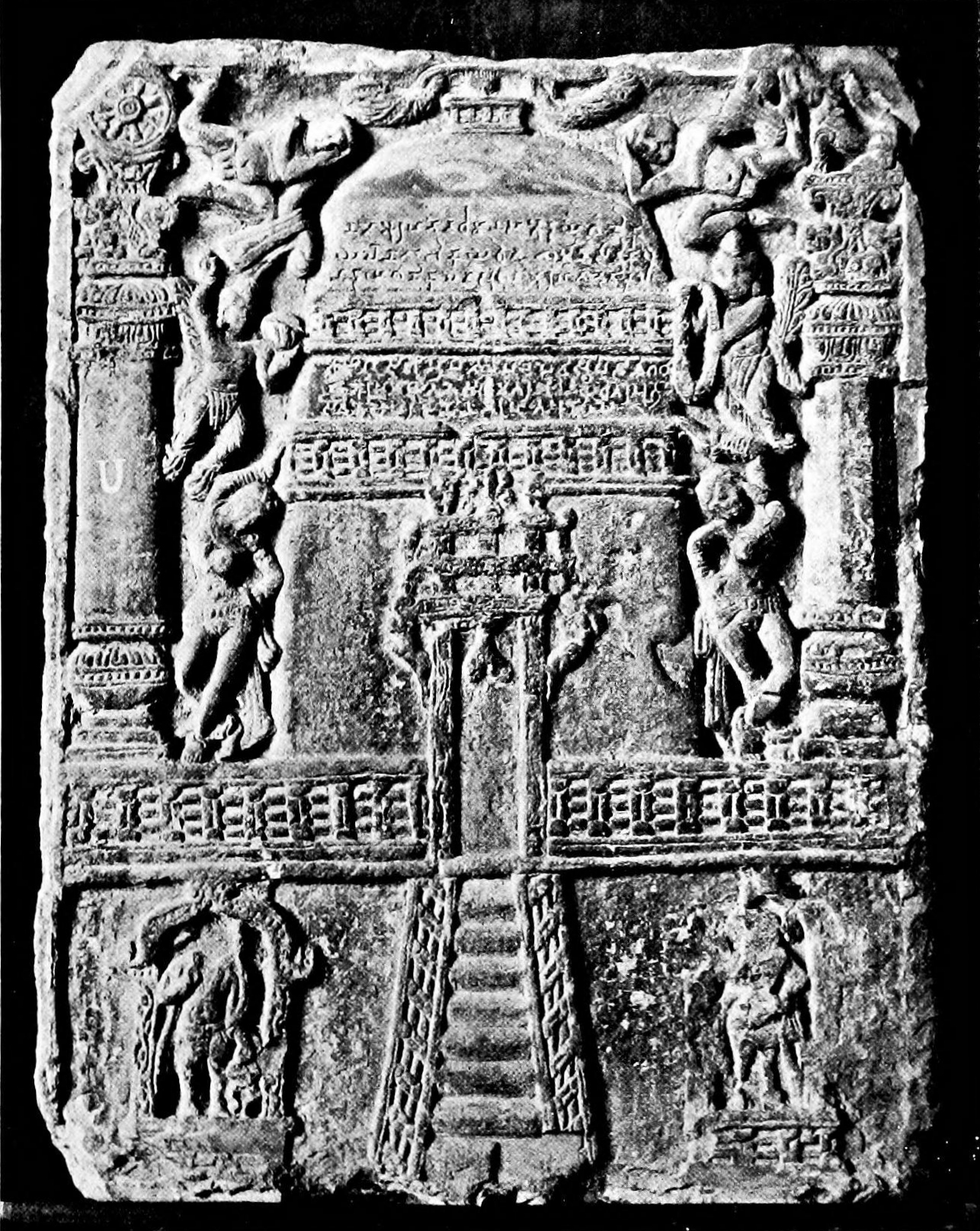
Jain votive plaque with Jain stupa, the "Vasu Śilāpaṭa" ayagapata, 1st century CE, excavated from Kankali Tila, Mathura.

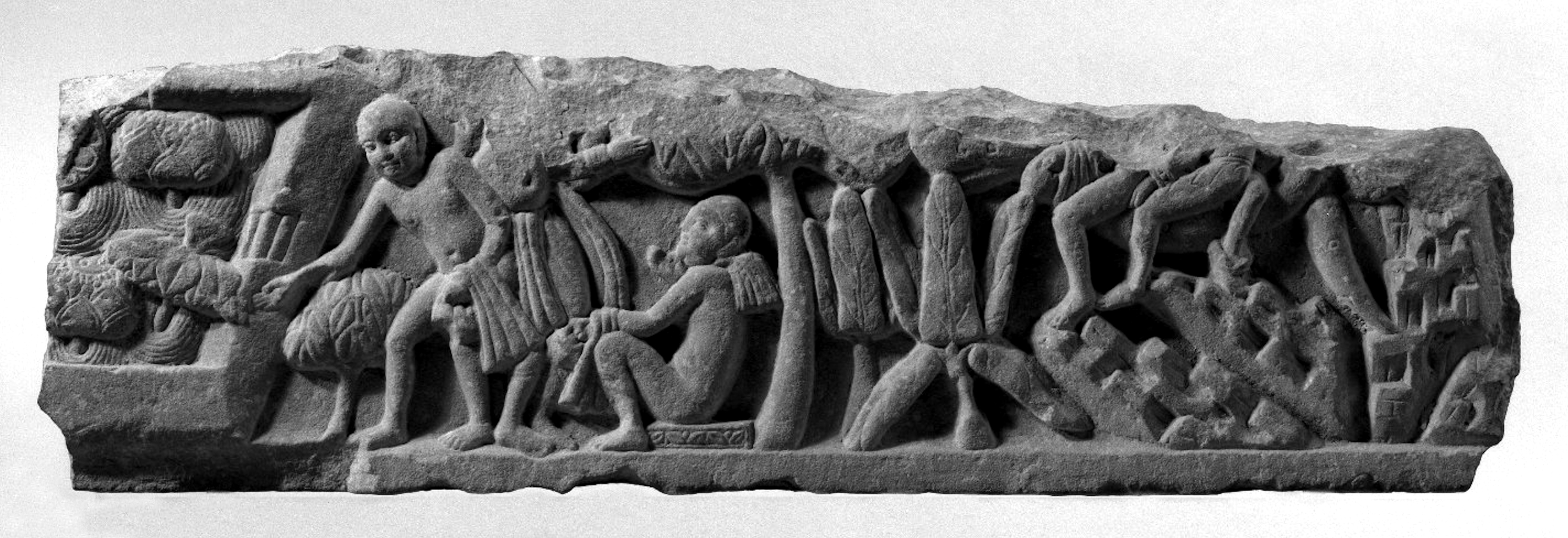
Jain relief showing monks of the ardhaphalaka sect. Early 1st century CE.

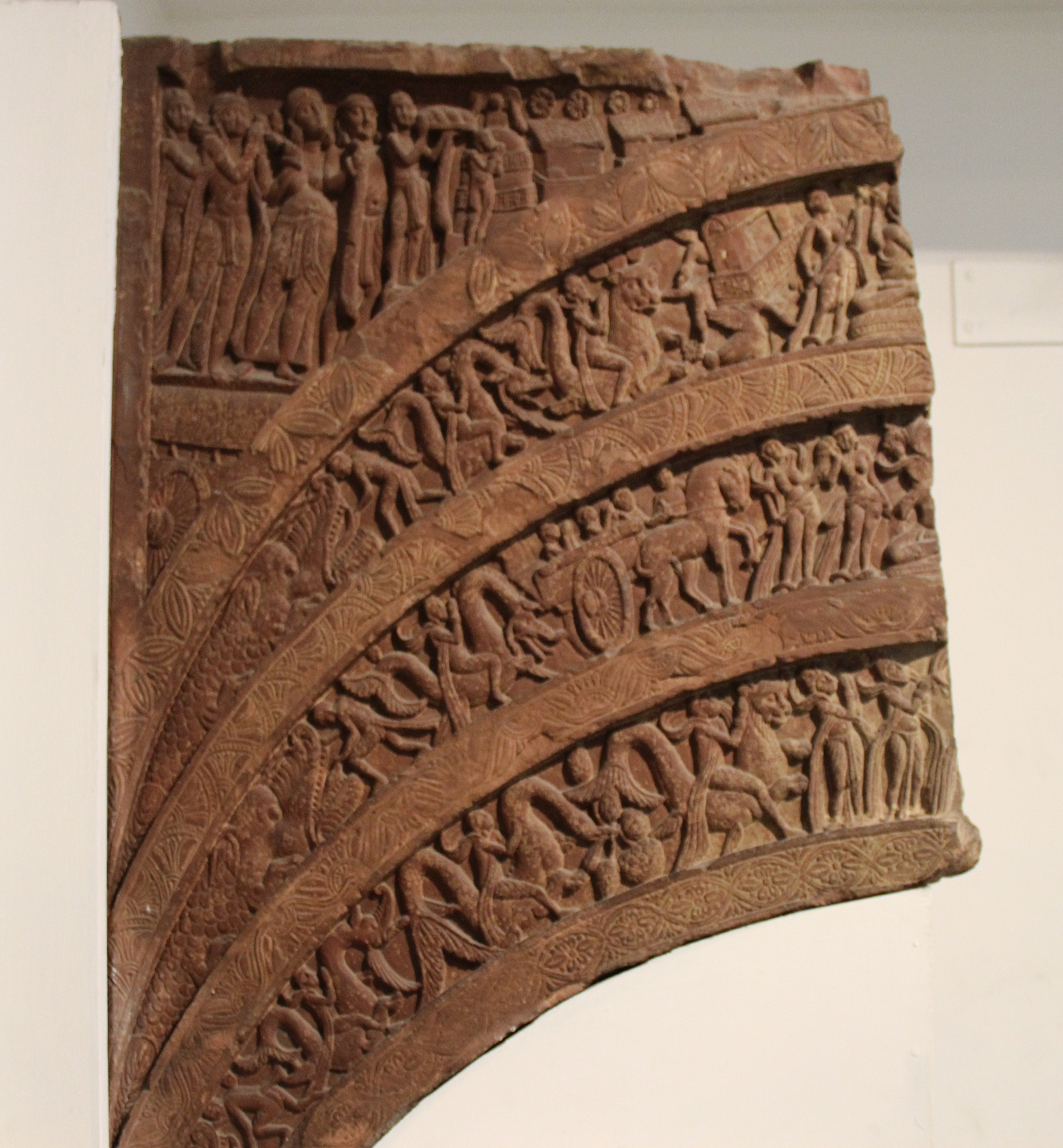
Jain decorated tympanum from Kankali Tila, Mathura, 15 CE.

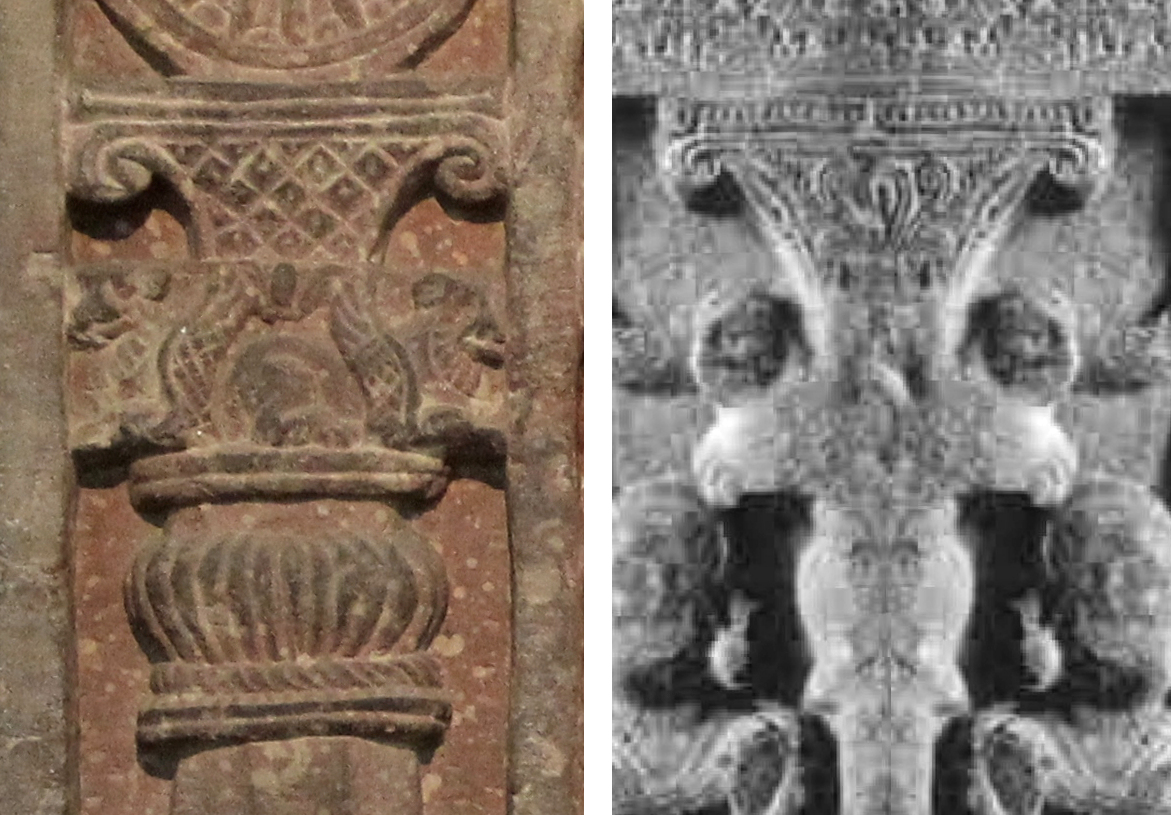
"Persian Achaemenian" style capitals appearing in ayagapatas, Mathura, 15-50 CE.

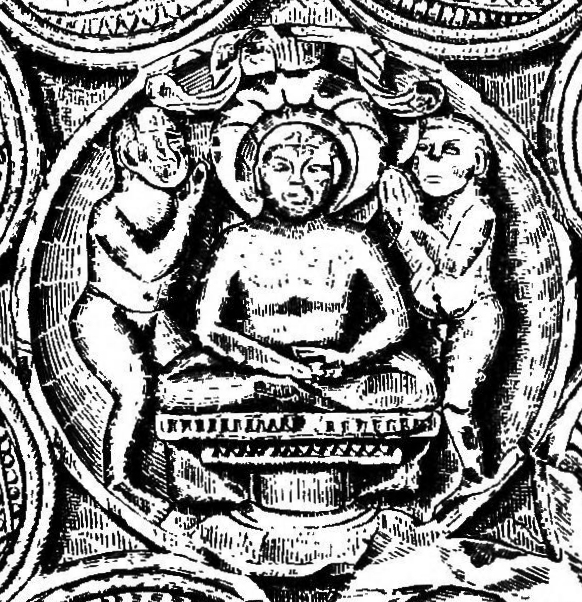
The Jina Parsvanatha (detail of an ayagapata), highly similar to the Isapur Buddha, Mathura circa 15 CE, Lucknow Museum.

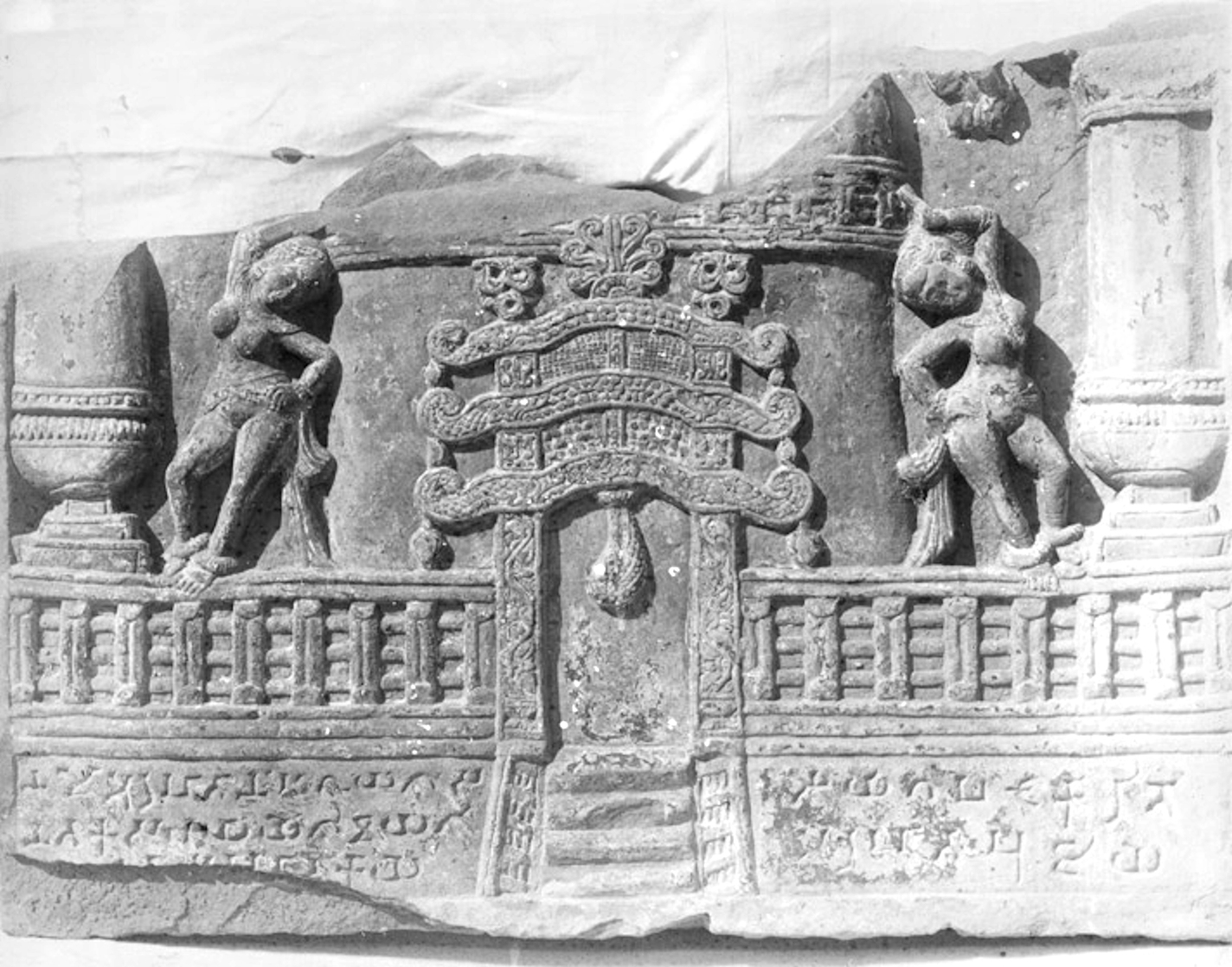
Sivayasa Ayagapata, with Jain stupa fragment, Kankali Tila, 75-100 CE.

==== Grapevine and garland designs (circa 15 CE) ====
A decorated doorjamb, the Vasu doorjamb, dedicated to deity Vāsudeva, also mentions the rule of Sodasa, and has similar carving to the Mora doorjamb, found in relation with the Mora well inscription in a similar chronological and religious context. The decoration of these and many similar doorjambs from Mathura consists in scrolls of grapevines. They are all dated to the reign of Sodasa, circa 15 CE and constitute a secure dated artistic reference for the evaluation of datation of other Mathura sculptures. It has been suggested that the grapevine design had been introduced from the Gandhara area in the northwest, and maybe associated with the northern taste of the Satrap rulers. These designs may also be the result of the work of northern artists in Mathura. The grapevine designs of Gandhara are generally considered as originating from Hellenistic art.

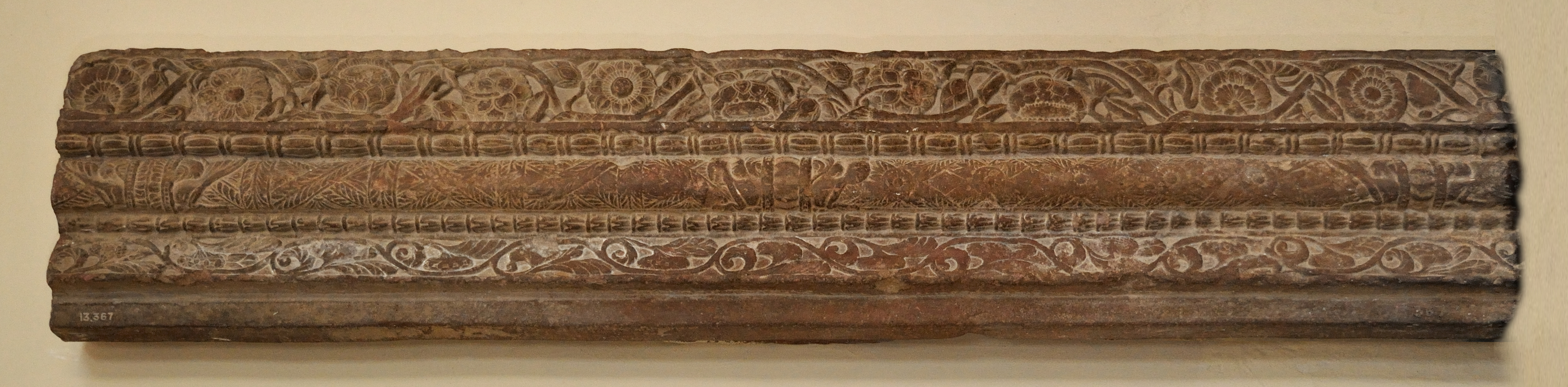
The Vasu doorjamb, dedicated to Vāsudeva "in the reign of Sodasa", Mathura, circa 15 CE. Mathura Museum, GMM 13.367

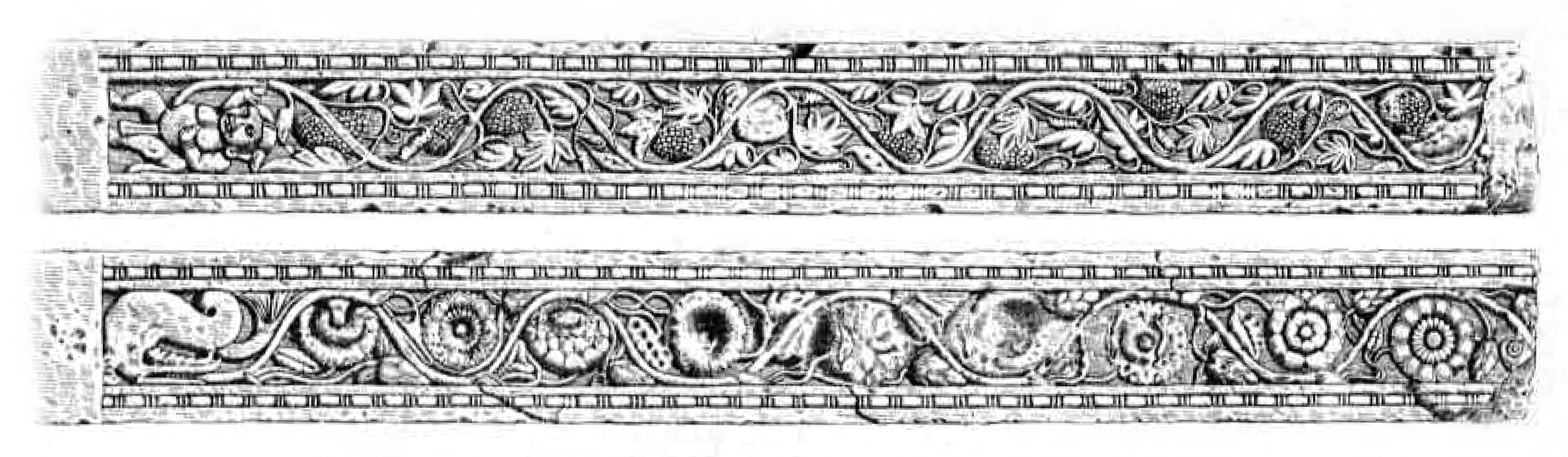
Reliefs of the Mora doorjamb with grapevine design, Mora, near Mathura, circa 15 CE. State Museum Lucknow, SML J.526. Similar scroll designs are known from Gandhara, from Pataliputra, and from Greco-Roman art.

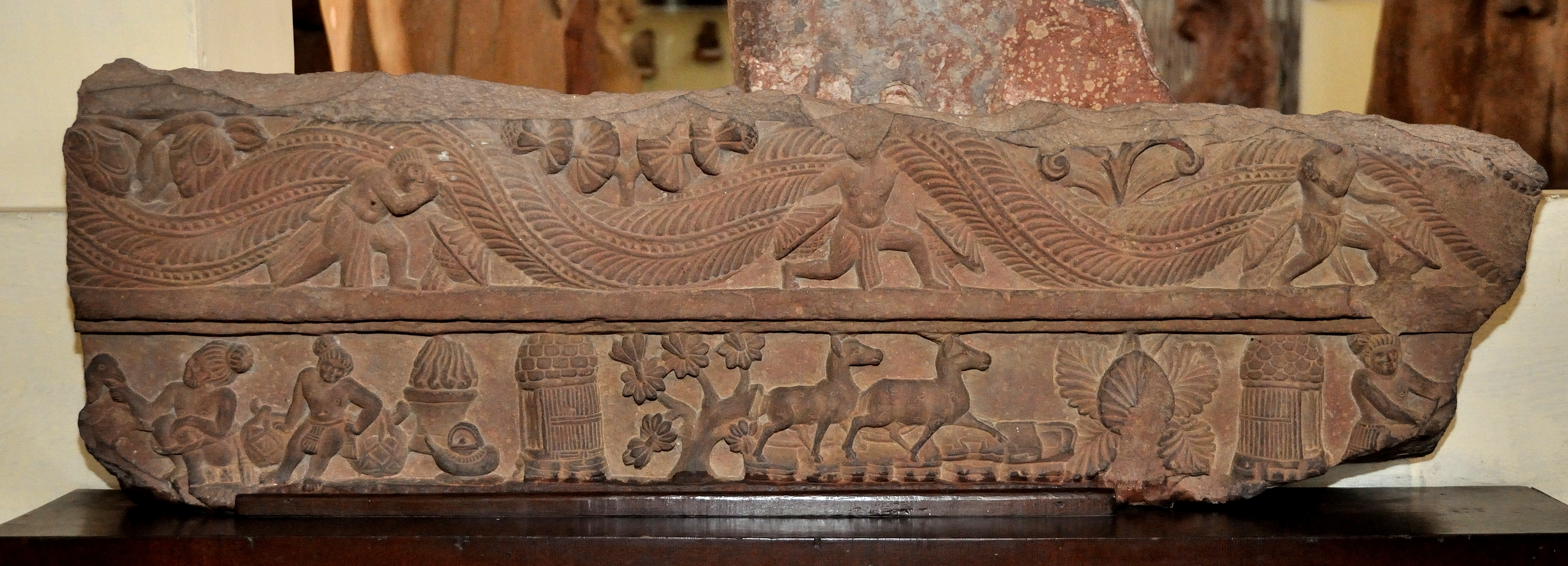
Garland bearers and Buddhist "Romaka" Jataka, in which the Buddha in a previous life was a pigeon. 25-50 CE. Similar garland-bearer designs are known from Gandhara, from Amaravati and from Greco-Roman art.

==== Calligraphy (end 1st century BCE – 1st century CE) ====
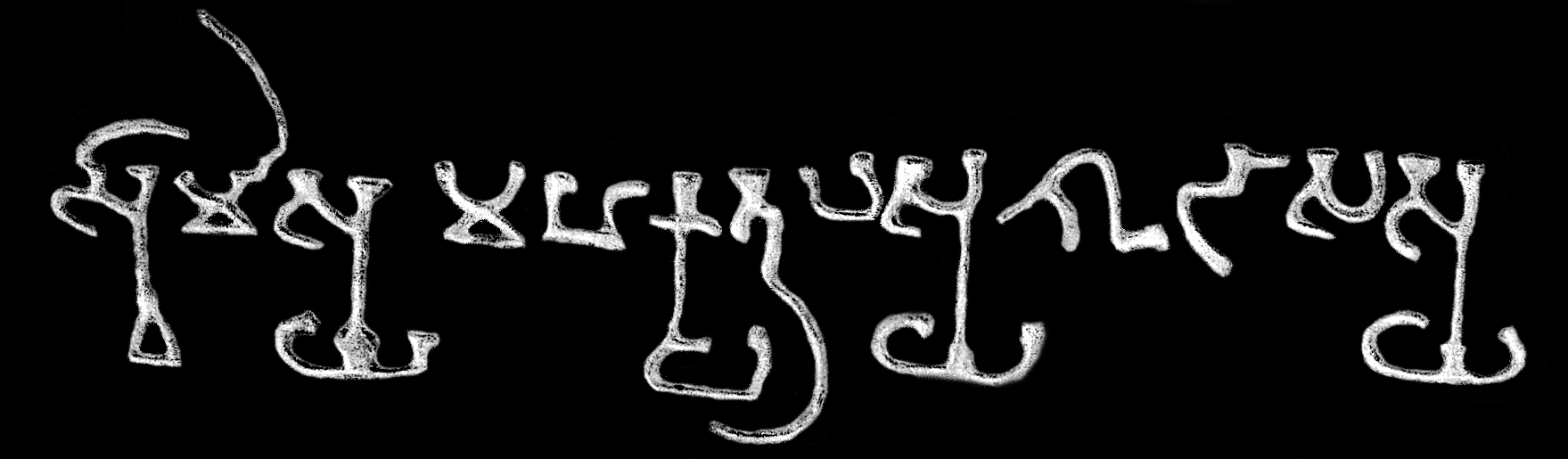
A sample of the new calligraphic style introduced by the Indo-Scythians: fragment of the Mirzapur stele inscription, in the vicinity of Mathura, circa 15 CE. Svāmisya Mahakṣatrapasya Śudasasya "Of the Lord and Great Satrap Śudāsa"

The calligraphy of the Brahmi script had remained virtually unchanged from the time of the Maurya Empire to the end of the 1st century BCE. The Indo-Scythians, following their establishment in northern India introduced "revolutionary changes" in the way Brahmi was written. In the 1st century BCE, the shape of Brahmi characters became more angular, and the vertical segments of letters were equalized, a phenomenon which is clearly visible in coin legends and made the script visually more similarly to Greek. In this new typeface, the letter were "neat and well-formed". The probable introduction of ink and pen writing, with the characteristic thickenned start of each stroke generated by the usage of ink, was reproduced in the calligraphy of stone inscriptions by the creation of a triangle-shaped form at the beginning of each stroke. This new writing style is particularly visible in the numerous dedicatory inscriptions made in Mathura, in association with devotional works of art. This new calligraphy of the Brahmi script was adopted in the rest of the subcontinent of the next half century. The "new-pen-style" initiated a rapid evolution of the script from the 1st century CE, with regional variations starting to emerge.

==== First images of the Buddha (from circa 15 CE) ====
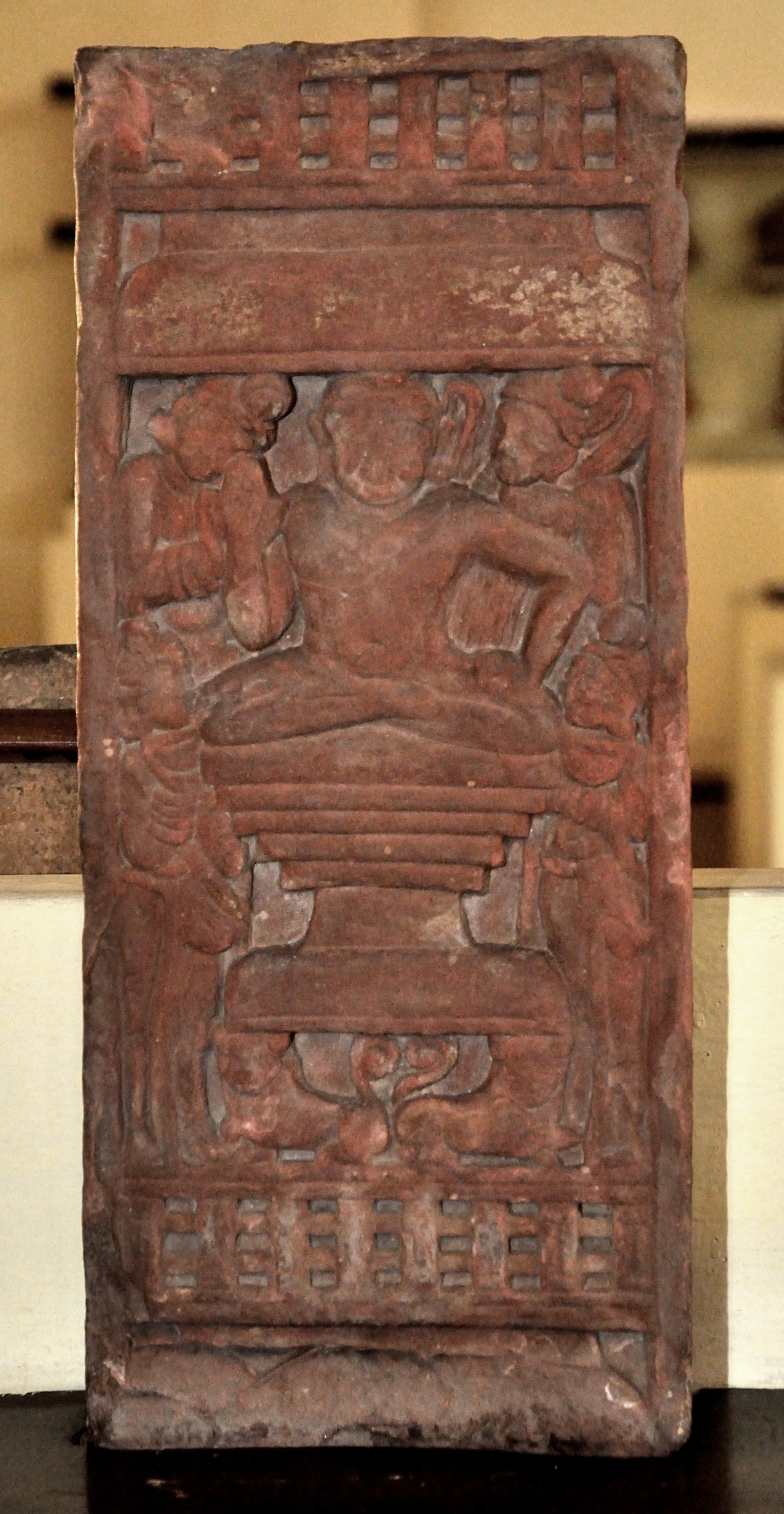
The "Isapur Buddha", probably the earliest known representation of the Buddha (possibly together with the Butkara seated Buddha statue at the Butkara Stupa, Swat), on a railing post, dated to circa 15 CE.

From around the 2nd-1st century BCE at Bharhut and Sanchi, scenes of the life of the Buddha, or sometimes of his previous lives, had been illustrated without showing the Buddha himself, except for some of his symbols such as the empty throne, or the Chankrama pathway. This artistic device ended with the sudden appearance of the Buddha, probably rather simultaneously in Gandhara and Mathura, at the turn of the millennium.

Possibly the first known representation of the Buddha (the Bimaran casket and the Tillya Tepe Buddhist coin are other candidates), the "Isapur Buddha" is also dated on stylistic grounds to the reign of Sodasa, circa 15 CE; he is shown on a relief in a canonical scene known as "Lokapalas offer Alms Bowls to the Buddha Sakyamuni". The symbolism of this early statue is still tentative, drawing heavily on the earlier, especially Jain, pictural traditions of Mathura, still far from the exuberant standardized designs of the Kushan Empire. It is rather unassuming and not yet monumental compared to the Buddha sculptures of the following century, and may represent one of the first attempts to create a human icon, marking an evolution from the splendid aniconic tradition of Buddhist art in respect to the person of the Buddha, which can be seen in the art of Sanchi and Bharhut. This depiction of the Buddha is highly similar to Jain images of the period, such as the relief of Jina Parsvanatha on an ayagapata, also dated to circa 15 CE.

It is thought that the images of Jain saints, which can be seen in Mathura from the 1st century BCE, were prototypes for the first Mathura images of the Buddha, since the attitudes are very similar, and the almost transparent very thin garment of the Buddha not much different visually from the nakedness of the Jinas. Here the Buddha is not wearing the monastic robe which would become characteristic of many of the later Buddha images. The cross-legged sitting posture may have derived from earlier reliefs of cross-legged ascetics or teachers at Bharhut, Sanchi and Bodh Gaya. It has also been suggested that the cross-legged Buddhas may have derived from the depictions of seated Scythian kings from the northwest, as visible in the coinage of Maues (90–80 BCE) or Azes (57–10 BC).

There has been a recurring debate about the exact identity of these Mathura statues, some claiming that they are only statues of Bodhisattavas, which is indeed the exact term used in most of the inscriptions of the statues found in Mathura. Only one or two statues of the Mathura type are known to mention the Buddha himself. This could be in conformity with an ancient Buddhist prohibition against showing the Buddha himself in human form, otherwise known as aniconism in Buddhism, expressed in the Sarvastivada vinaya (rules of the early Buddhist school of the Sarvastivada): ""Since it is not permitted to make an image of the Buddha's body, I pray that the Buddha will grant that I can make an image of the attendant Bodhisattva. Is that acceptable?" The Buddha answered: "You may make an image of the Bodhisattava"". However the scenes in the Isapur Buddha and the later Indrasala Buddha (dated 50-100 CE), refer to events which are considered to have happened after the Buddha's enlightenment, and therefore probably represent the Buddha rather than his younger self as a Bodhisattava, or a simple attendant Bodhisattva.

===== Other reliefs =====
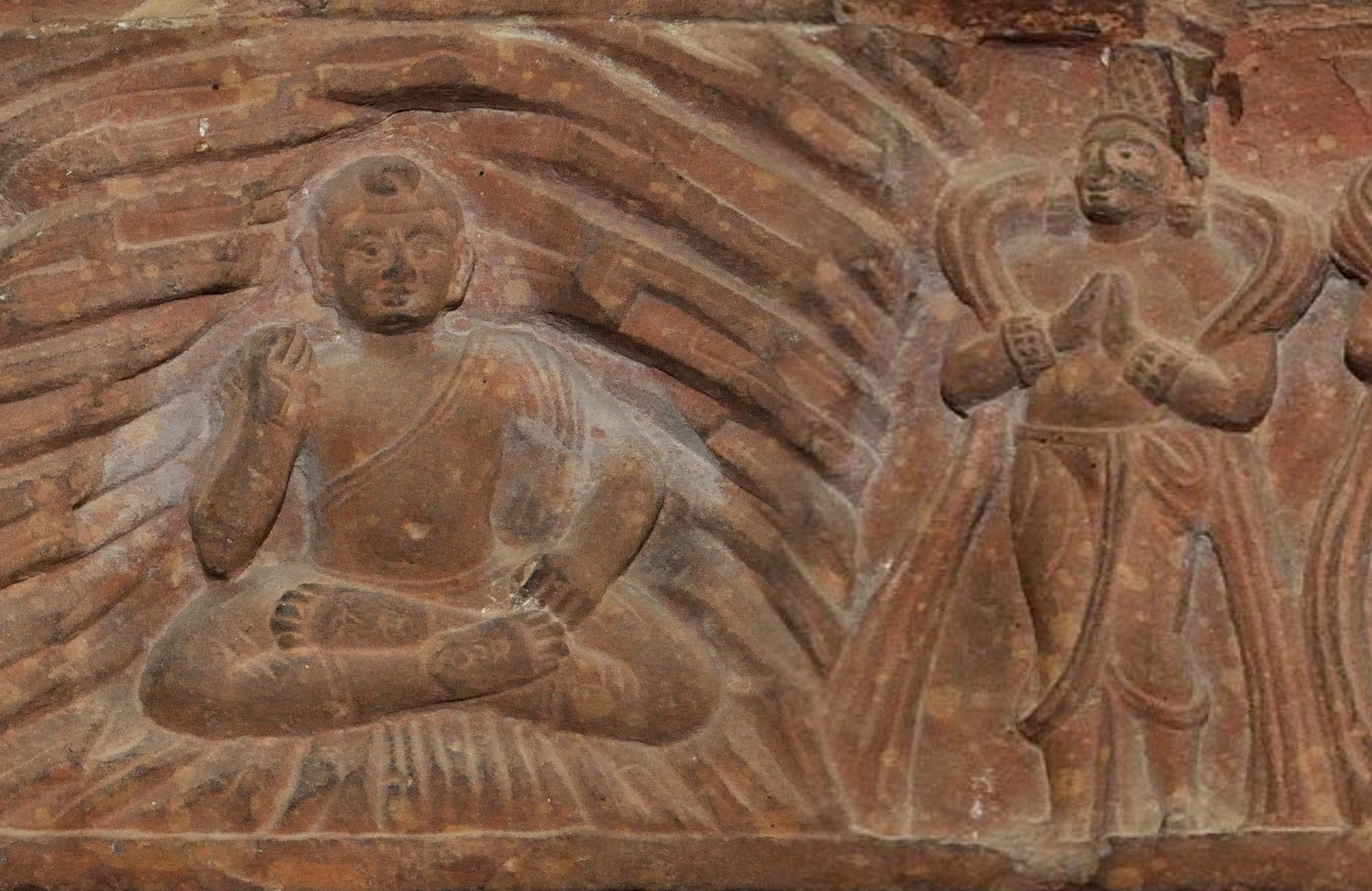
"Indrasala architrave", detail of the Buddha in Indrasala Cave, attended by the Vedic deity Indra. 50–100 CE.

The Buddhist "Indrasala architrave", dated 50–100 CE, with a scene of the Buddha at the Indrasala Cave being attended by Indra, and a scene of devotion to the Bodhi Tree on the other side, is another example of the still hesitant handling of the human icon of the Buddha in the Buddhist art of Mathura. The Buddhist character of this architrave is clearly demonstrated by the depiction of the Bodhi Tree inside its specially built temple at Bodh Gaya, a regular scene of Buddhism since the reliefs of Bharhut and Sanchi. The depiction of the Buddha in meditation in the Indrasala Cave is also characteristically Buddhist. The Buddha already has the attributes, if not the style, of the later "Kapardin" statues, except for the absence of a halo.

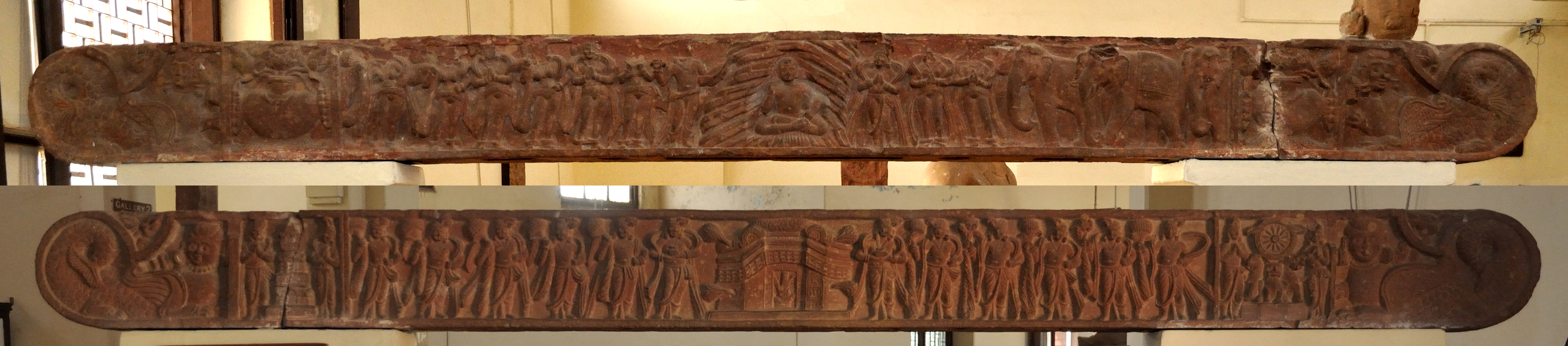
Buddhist "Indrasala architrave", with Buddha and Bodhi Tree in the center of each side, dated 50–100 CE, before the Kushan period. The Buddha is attended by Vedic deity Indra on the side of the Indrasala Cave.

===== Vedic deities =====
Besides the hero cult of the Vrishni heroes or the cross-sectarian cult of the Yakshas, Hindu art only started to develop fully from the 1st to the 2nd century CE, and there are only very few examples of artistic representation before that time. The three Vedic gods Indra, Brahma and Surya were actually first depicted in Buddhist sculpture, as attendants in scenes commemorating the life of the Buddha, even when the Buddha himself was not yet shown in human form but only through his symbols, such as the scenes of his Birth, his Descent from the Trāyastriṃśa Heaven, or his retreat in the Indrasala Cave. These Vedic deities appear in Buddhist reliefs at Mathura from around the 1st century CE, such as Indra attending the Buddha at Indrasala Cave, where Indra is shown with a mitre-like crown, and joining hands.

===== Early "Kapardin" statuary (end of 1st century CE) =====
Early "Kapardin" statuary

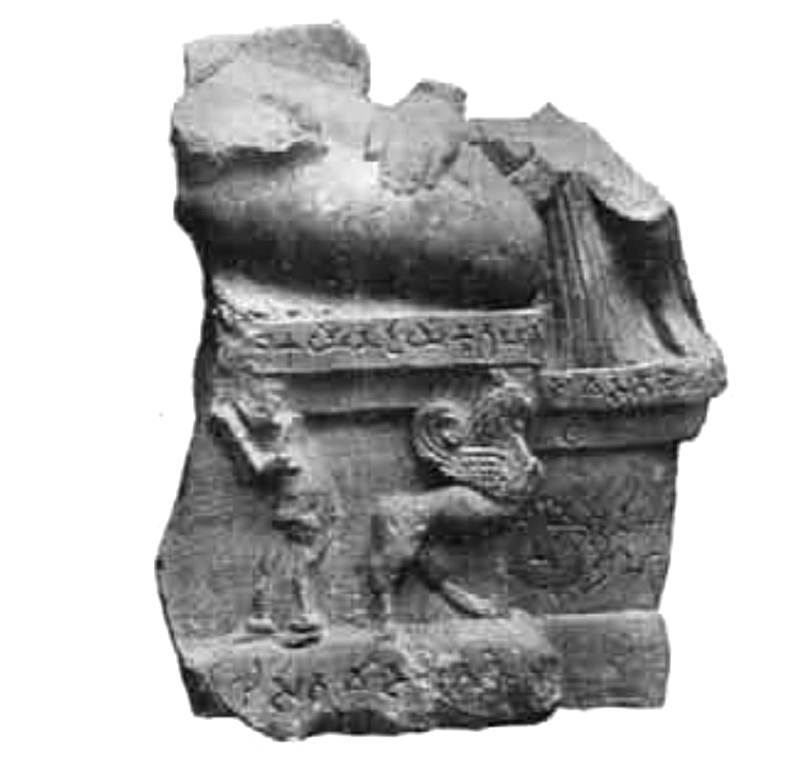
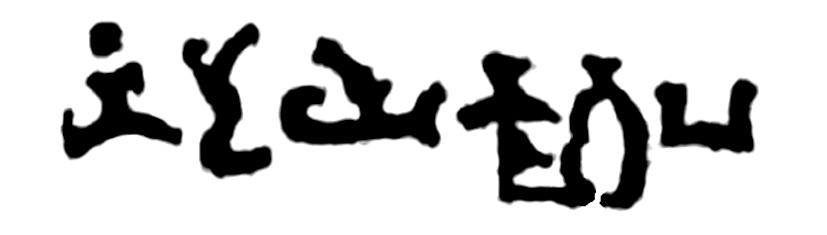
Katra fragment of a Buddha stele in the name of a "Kshatrapa lady" named Naṃda ( Naṃdaye Kshatrapa).

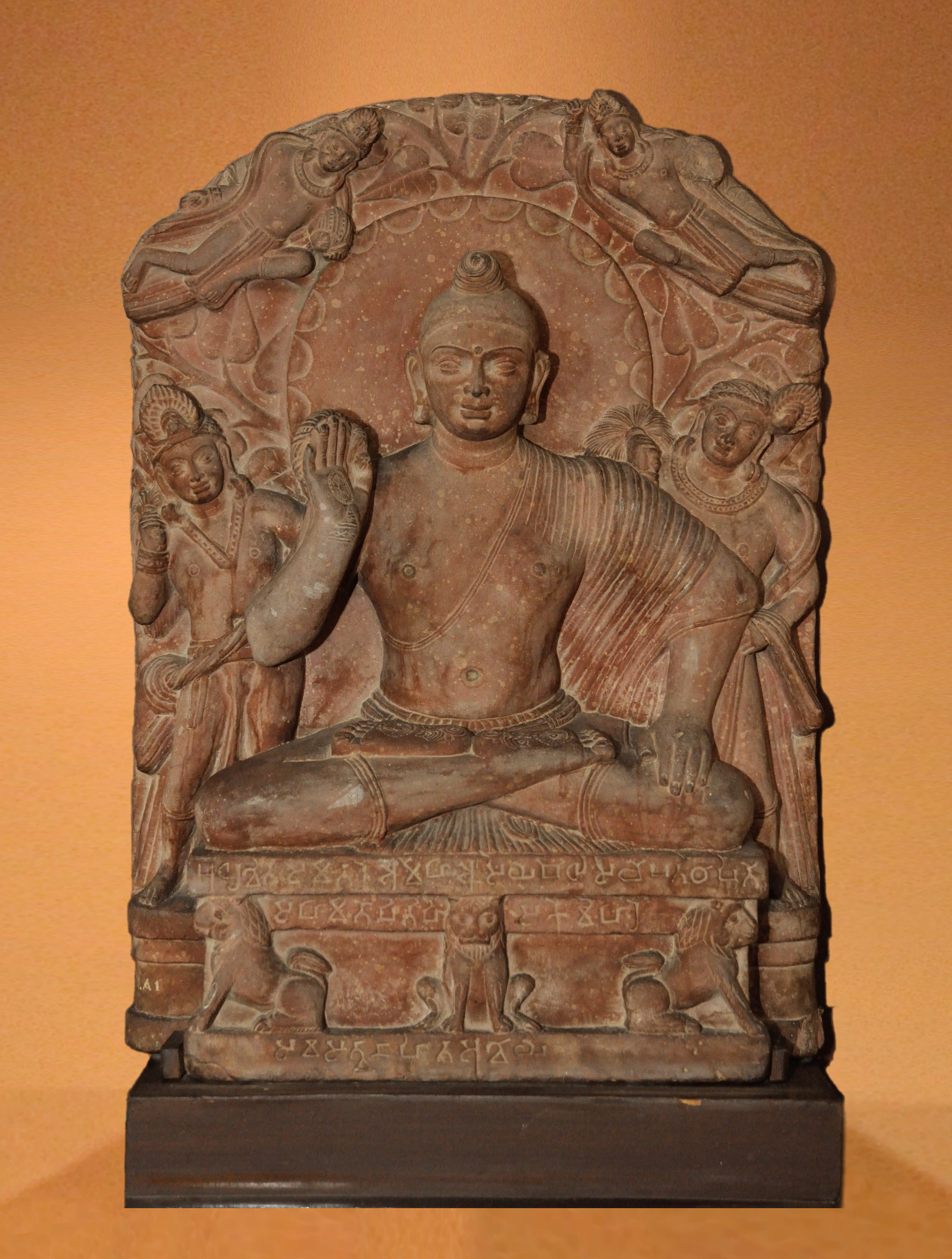
"Katra Bodhisattava stele" with inscription, dated to the Northern Satraps period.

The earliest types of "Kapardin" statuary (named after the "kapardin", the characteristic tuft of coiled hair of the Buddha) showing the Buddha with attendants are thought to be pre-Kushan, dating to the time of the "Kshatrapas" or Northern Satraps. Various broken bases of Buddha statues with inscriptions have been attributed to the Kshatrapas. A fragment of such a stele was found with the mention of the name of the donor as a "Kshatrapa lady" named Naṃda who dedicated the Bodhisattva image "for the welfare and happiness of all sentient beings for the acceptance of the Sarvastivadas", and it is considered as contemporary with the famous "Katra stele".

One of these early examples shows the Buddha being worshipped by the Gods Brahma and Indra.

The famous "Katra Bodhisattava stele" is the only fully intact image of a "Kapardin" Bodhisattva remaining from the Kshatrapa period, and is considered as the foundation type of the "Kapardin" Buddha imagery, and is the "classical statement of the type".

In conclusion, the canonical type of the seated Bodhisattva with attendants commonly known as the "Kapardin" type, seems to have developed during the time the Indo-Scythian Northern Satraps were still ruling in Mathura, before the arrival of the Kushans. This type continued during the Kushan period, down to the time of Huvishka, before being overtaken by fully-dressed types of Buddha statuary depicting the Buddha wearing the monastic coat "Samghati".

== Kushan period (ca. 90–300 CE) ==
Dynastic statue of Kanishka
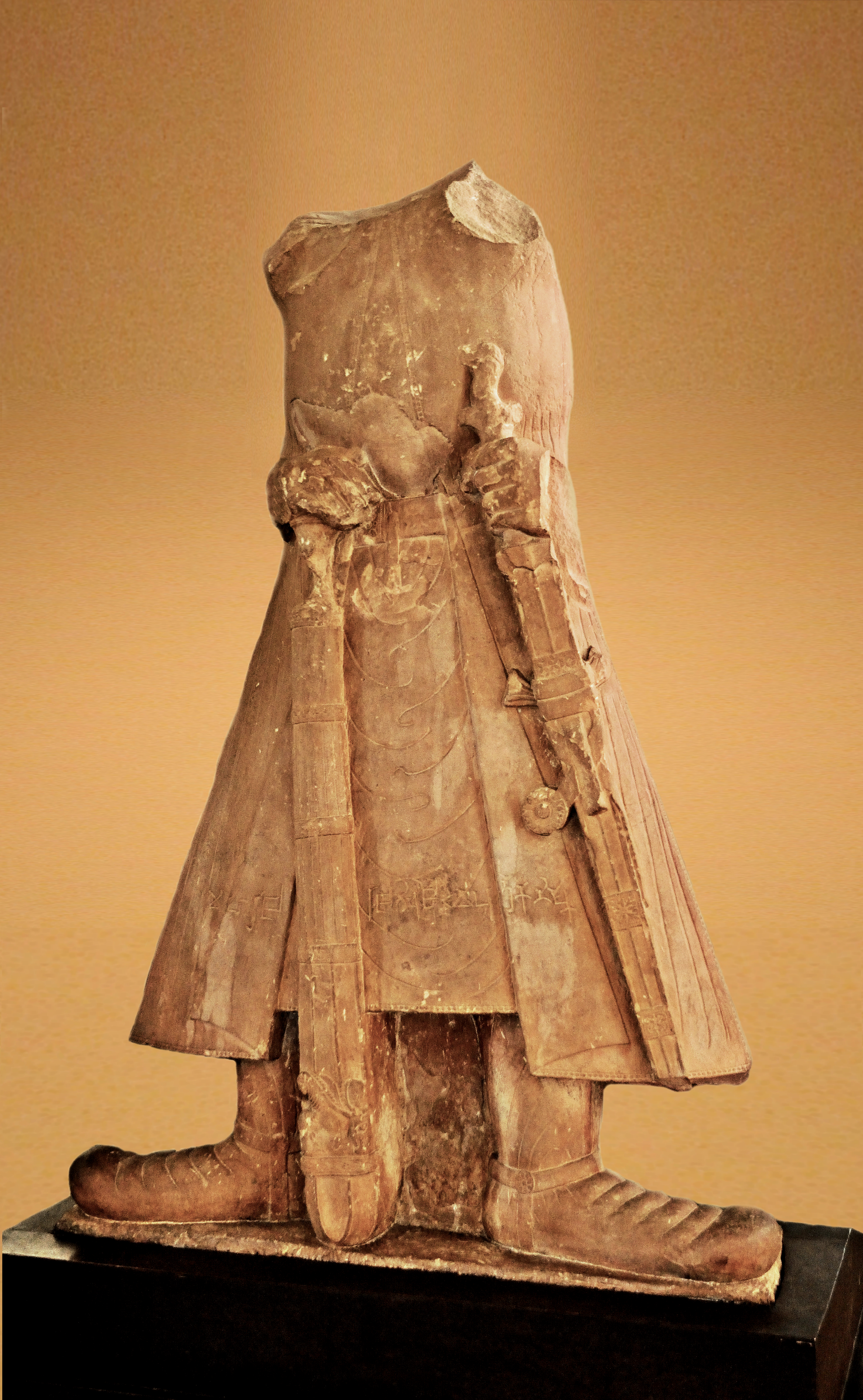
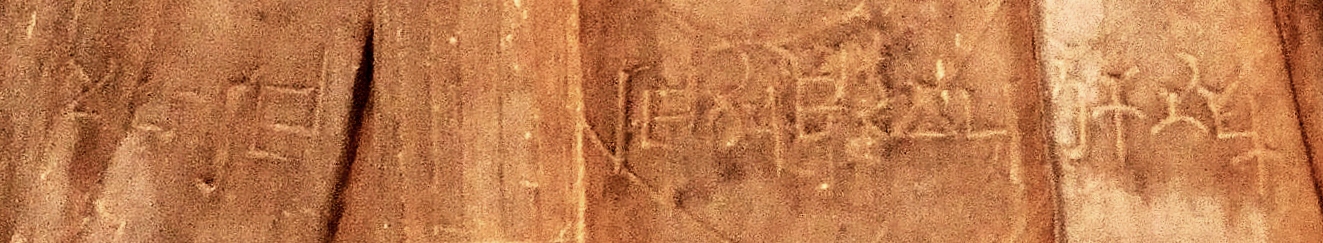
Statue of Kushan emperor Kanishka I (c. 127–150 CE) in long coat and boots, holding a mace and a sword, from the Māt sanctuary in Mathura. An inscription runs along the bottom of the coat:

Mahārāja Rājadhirāja Devaputra Kāṇiṣka
"The Great King, King of Kings, Son of God, Kanishka".
Mathura Museum

Mathura became part of the Kushan Empire from the reign of Vima Kadphises (90–100 CE) and then became the southern capital of the Kushan Empire. Free-standing statues of the Buddha are mass-produced around this time, possibly encouraged by doctrinal changes in Buddhism allowing to depart from the aniconism that had prevailed in the Buddhist sculptures at Mathura, Bharhut or Sanchi from the end of the 2nd century BCE. The Greco-Buddhist art of Gandhara appears to have fully developed around this time too, also under the rule of the Kushans, following on earlier imagery such as the Bimaran casket or the Butkara seated Buddha at the Butkara Stupa in Swat. In 2008 a second sculpture in the distinctive Mathura red sandstone was excavated at Taxila in Gandhara (modern Pakistan).

=== Dynastic art of the Kushans in Mathura ===
The Kushans vigorously promoted royal portraiture, as can be seen in their dynastic sculptures from Bactria to the region of Mathura. Monumental sculptures of Kushan rulers, particularly Vima Kadphises and Kanishka I has been found in the ruins of the Temple of Mat in Mathura. The statues are characterized by their frontality and martial stance, with Kanishka being shown holding firmly his sword and a huge mace. They are wearing heavy coats and heavy riding boots typical of the clothing of Central Asian nomads at that time, irrespective of the warm climate of India. The coats are richly decorated with hundreds of pearls, which probably symbolize wealth. These grandiose displays of Kushan dynastic power were accompanied by surperlative regnal titles: the statue of Kanishka is inscribed in Brahmi script with the sentence "The Great King, King of Kings, Son of God, Kanishka".

To some extent, as the Kushans progressively adapted to life in India, their dress progressively became lighter, and representation less frontal and more natural, although they generally retained characteristic elements of their nomadic dress, such as the trousers and boots, the heavy tunics, and heavy belts.

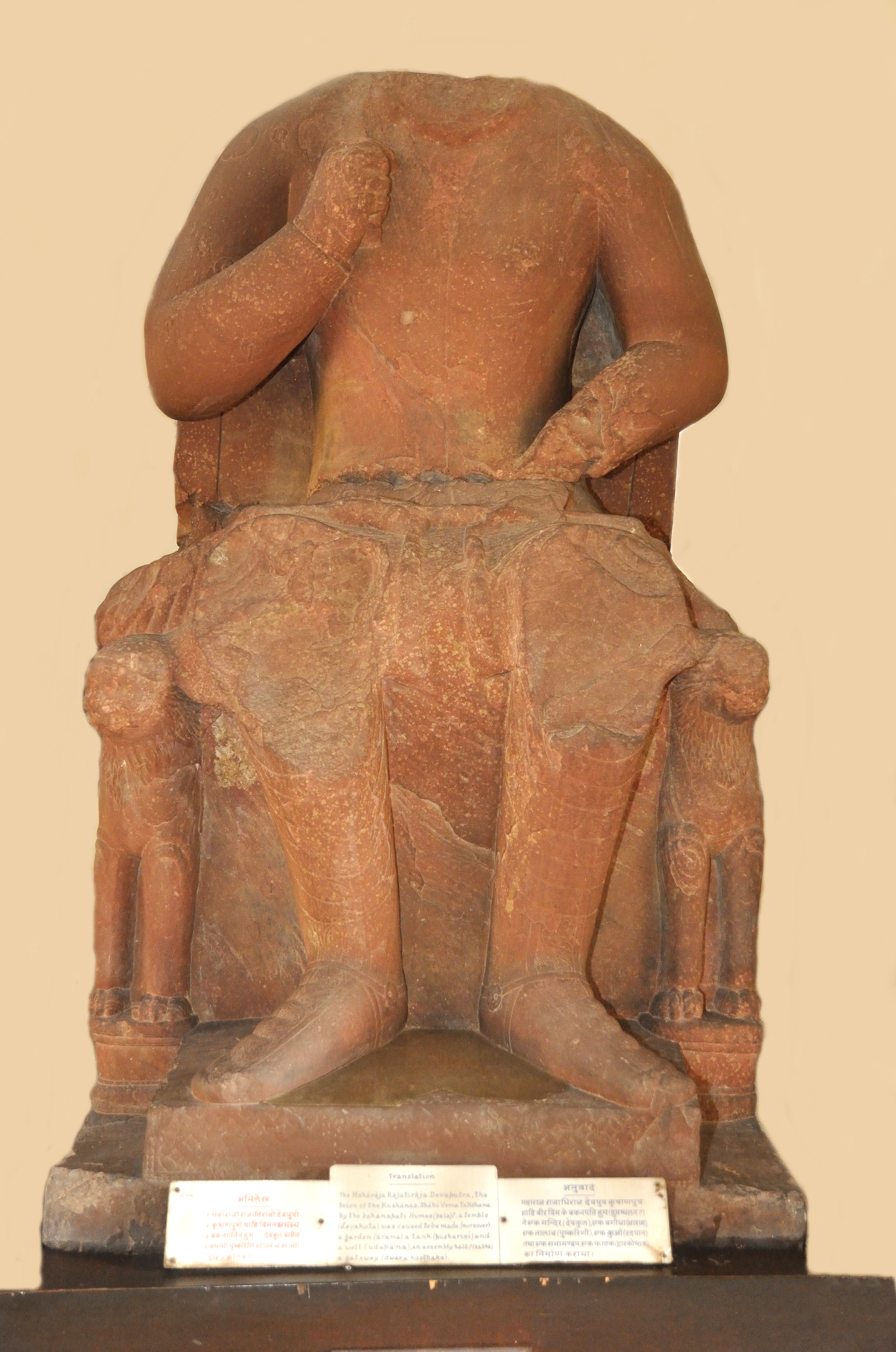
Monumental statue of Vima Kadphises, 1st century CE, Mathura Museum

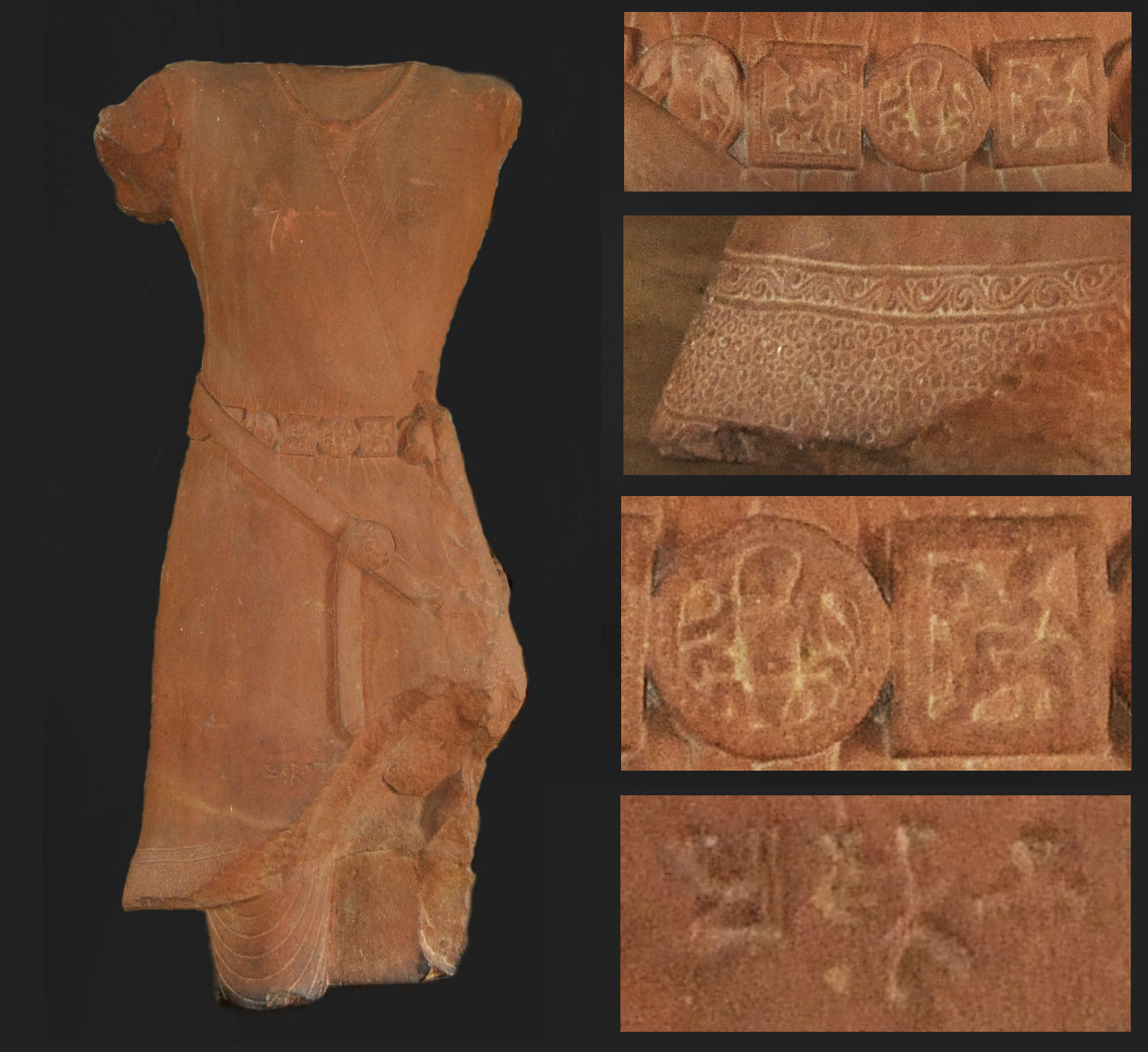
Statue of the Saka Prince Chastana, with costume details. 2nd century CE. Mathura Museum

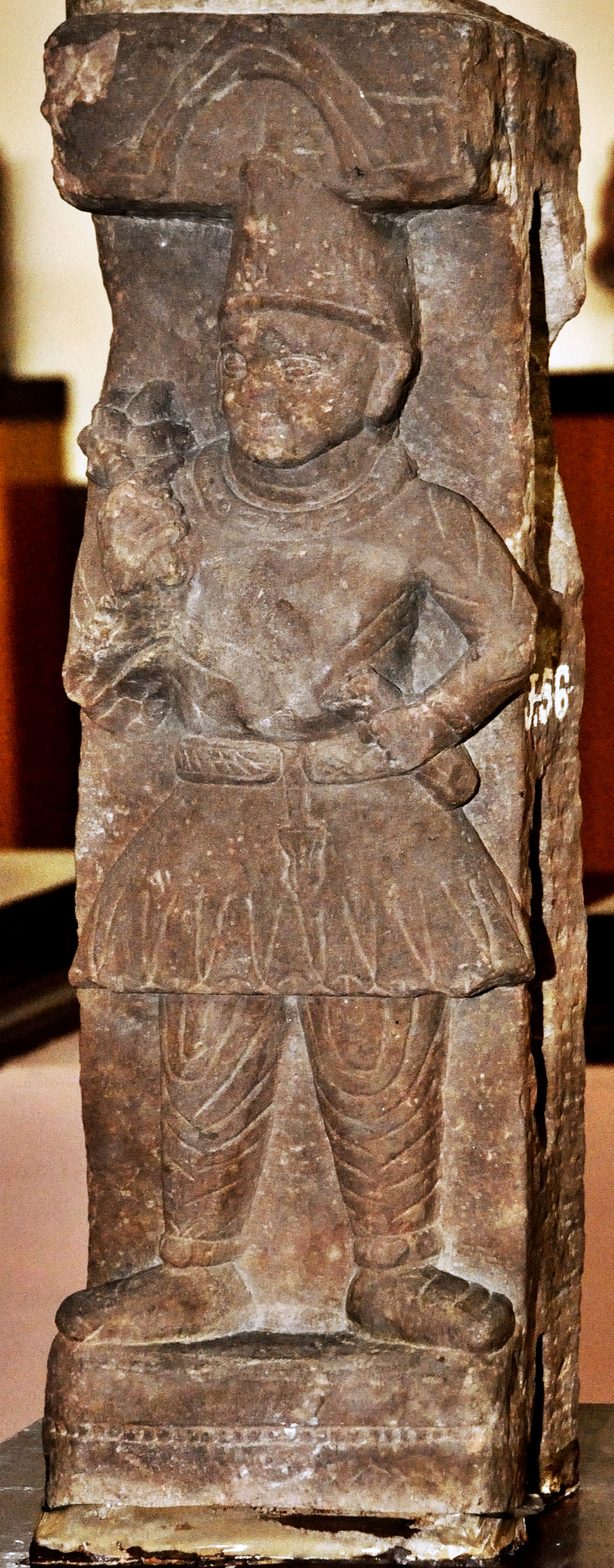
Kushan devotee, Mathura Museum

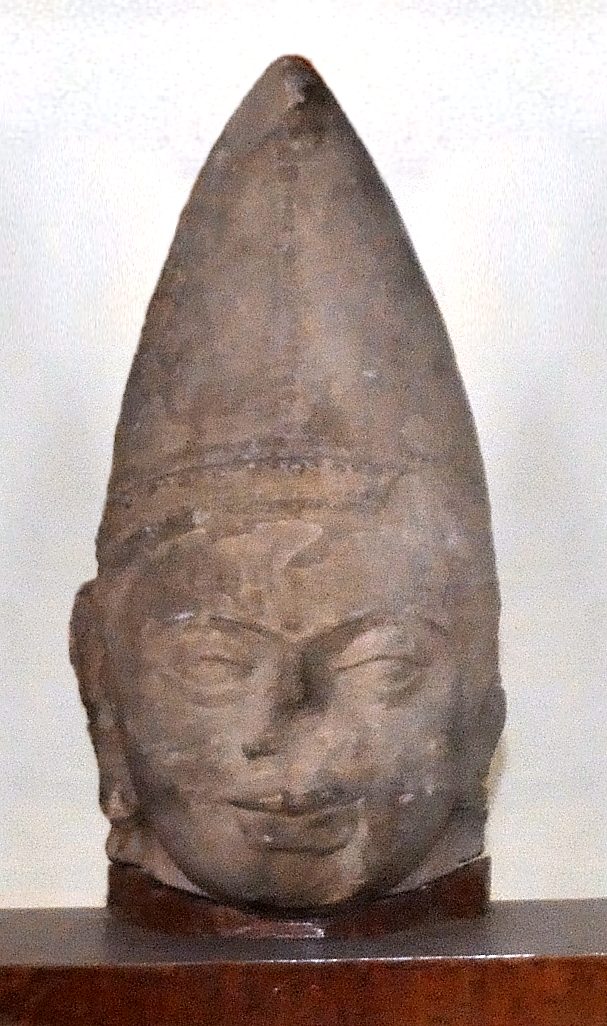
Saka or Kushan Prince in pointed cap. Mathura Museum

=== "Kapardin" Bodhisattva statuary (2nd century CE) ===
Seated Bodhisattva with attendants
("Year 4 of the Great King Kanishka")

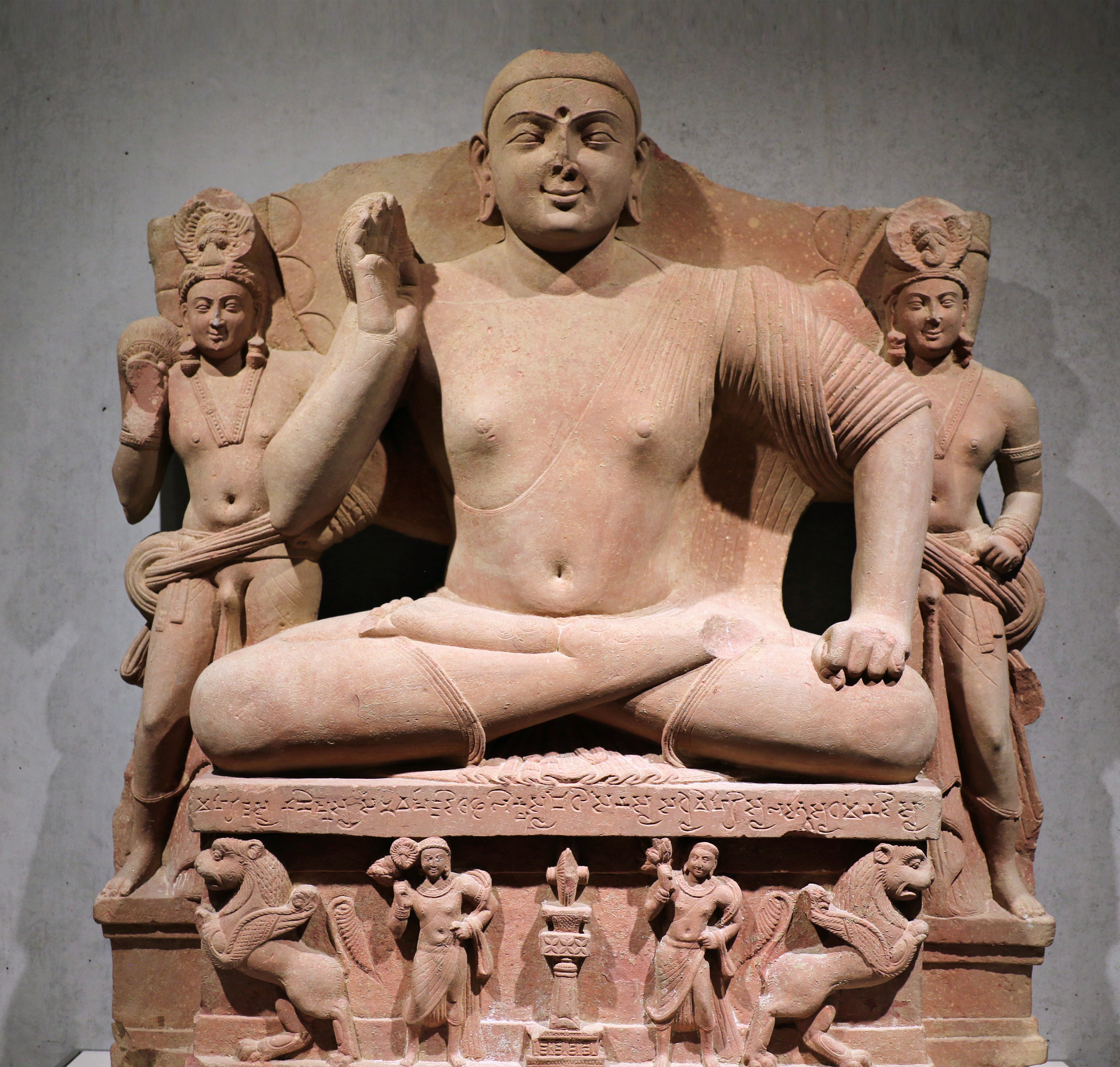
The "Kimbell seated Bodhisattva" with attendants, 131 CE, Mathura. Kimbell Art Museum

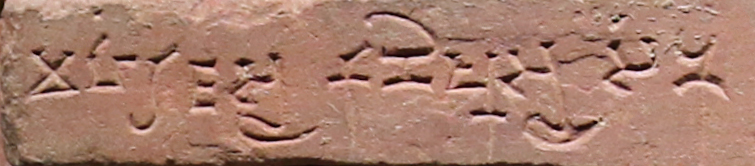
On the pedestal, Brahmi inscription:
𑁕
Maharajasya Kanishkasya Sam 4
"Year 4 of the Great King Kanishka"

Buddhism and Buddhist art are already gained prominence in Mathura during the 1st century CE under the patronage of the Northern Satraps. The Kushans adopted the anthropomorphic image of the Buddha, and developed it into a standardized mode of representation, using "confident and powerful imagery" on a grand scale.

The early representation of the Buddha by the Kushans are those of the "Kapardin" Bodhisattva type, "Kapardin" referring to the coiled hair tuft on top of his head. The Buddha is shown with his appearance after Renunciation from princely life, after having abandoned his turban and his jewellery, but before enlightenment and Buddhahood, as he is only wearing a regular shawl and a dhoti, rather than the later "samghati" monastic dress. When inscribed, these statues invariably mention the "Bodhisattva" rather than the Buddha, except for one or two very rare examples. It is thought that the focus on Bodhisattva images may have been in conformity with an ancient Buddhist prohibition against showing the Buddha himself in human form, otherwise known as aniconism in Buddhism, expressed in the Sarvastivada vinaya (rules of the early Buddhist school of the Sarvastivada): ""Since it is not permitted to make an image of the Buddha's body, I pray that the Buddha will grant that I can make an image of the attendant Bodhisattva. Is that acceptable?" The Buddha answered: "You may make an image of the Bodhisattava"".

Statues of the "Kapardin" type inscribed with dates range from the year 2 of Kanishka, to year 39 (129–166 CE). One dated example of statuary from that period is the Bala Bodhisattva, which, although discovered in Sarnath is thought to have been transported from the workshops of Mathura. The statue clearly embodies the state of artistic attainment under the rule of Kushan ruler Kanishka. The Bala Boddhisattva is also nearly identical in style with other known statues from Mathura but definitely dated with its inscription. This is also the case of the Kimbell seated Bodhisattva, inscribed "4th year of Kanishka" and described as a Bodhisattva in its dedicatory inscription. Inscribed "Kapardin Bodhisattva" statues are unknown beyond "Year 39 of Kanishka" (166 CE), and after that time, the Gandharan type with monastic robe covering both shoulders would become prevalent well into the Gupta period, inscriptions now being made in the name of the Buddha, rather than the Bodhisattva.

The style of these statues is somewhat reminiscent of the earlier monumental Yaksha statues, usually dated to a few centuries earlier. On the contrary, despite other known instances of Hellenistic influence on Indian art, very little in Hellenistic style, if anything at all, can be seen in this type of statue. Especially the Greco-Buddhist art of Gandhara seems to have had little to no influence.

Apart from the seated Buddha triads of Mathura, several seated Buddha triads in an elaborate style are also known from Gandhara, which also belong to the early Kushan period, such as the Brussels Buddha which may be dated to the year 5 of Kanishka.

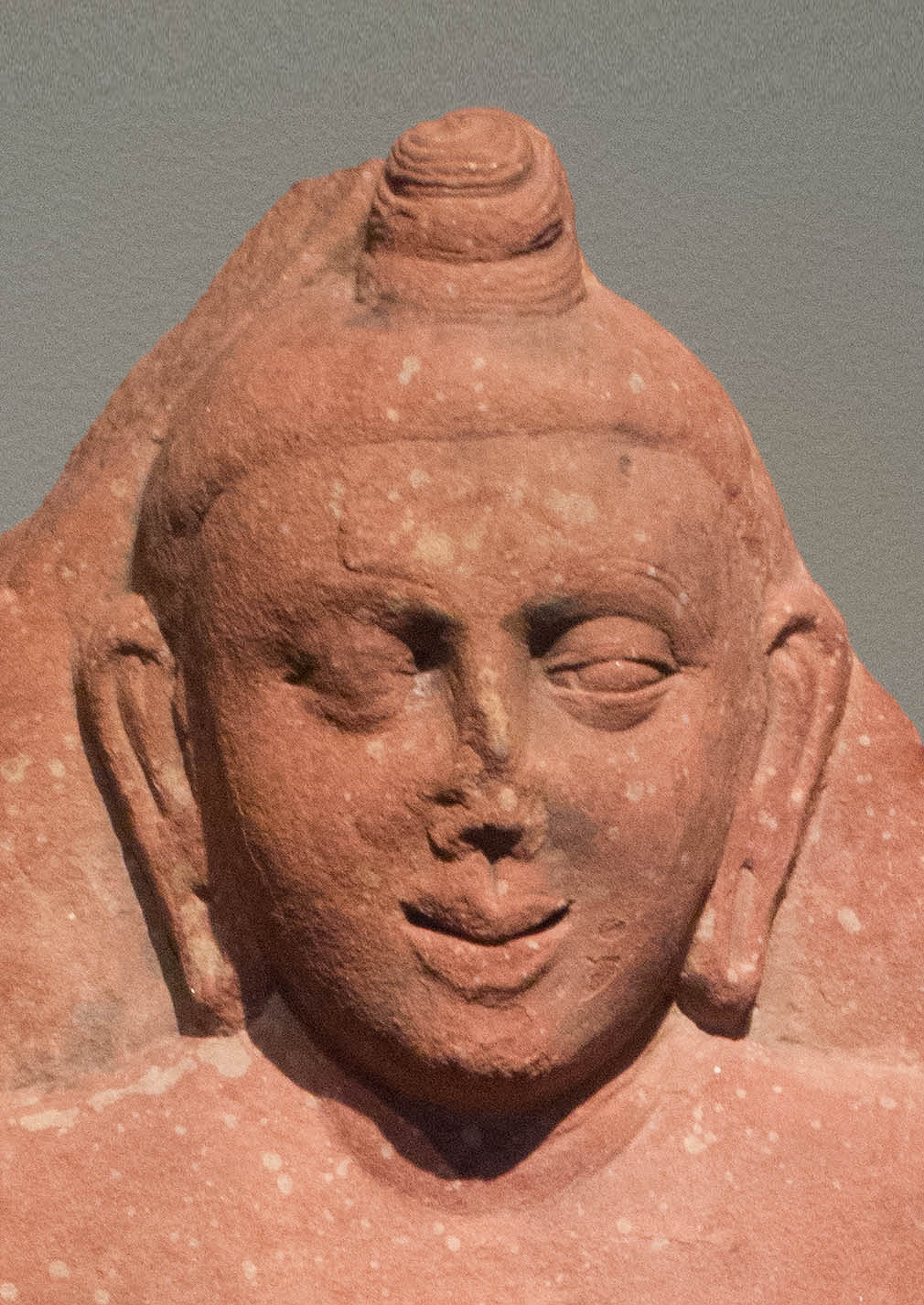
The coiled tuft of hair, known as "Kapardin".

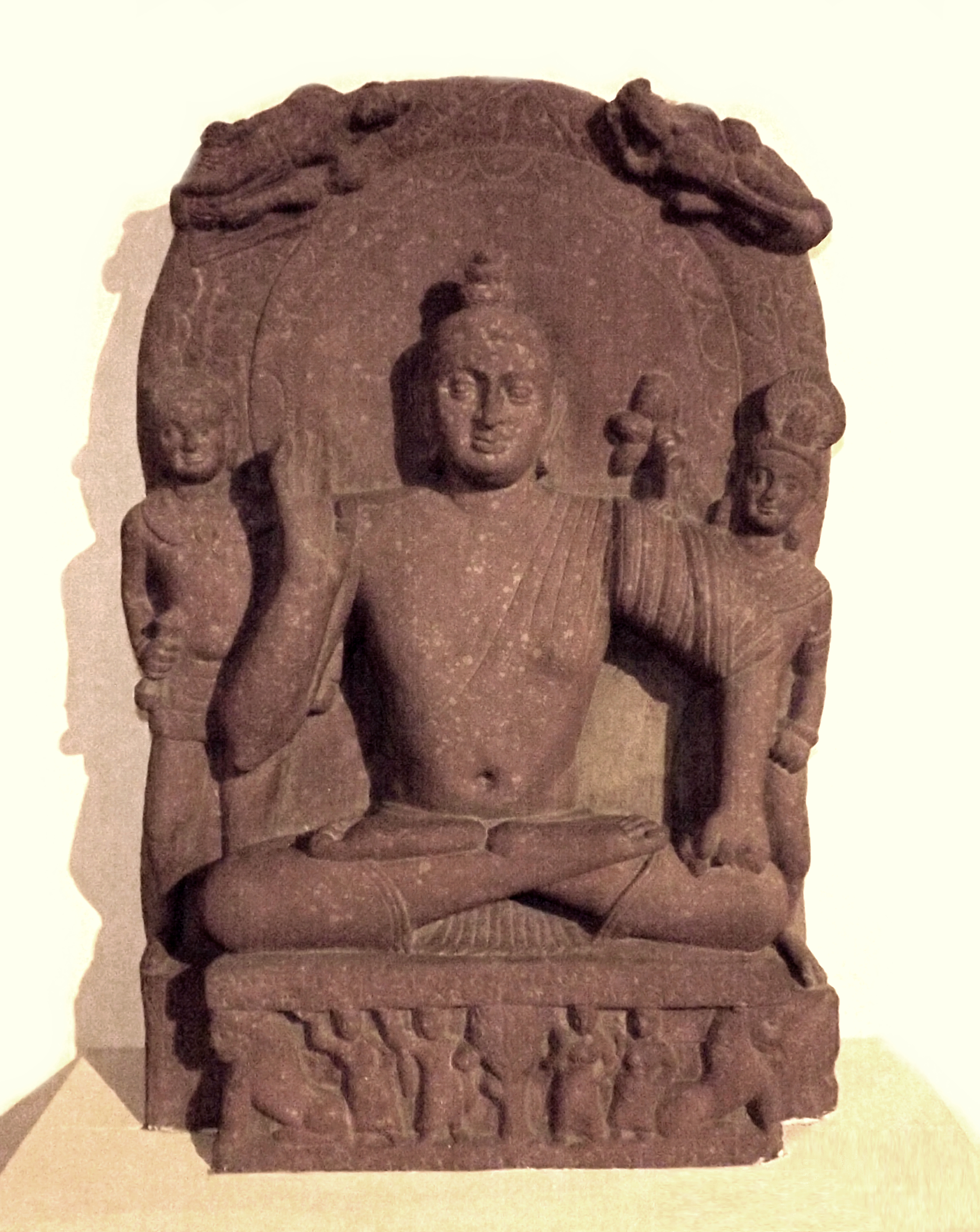
Seated Bodhisattva, inscribed "Year 32" of Kanishka (159 CE), Mathura.

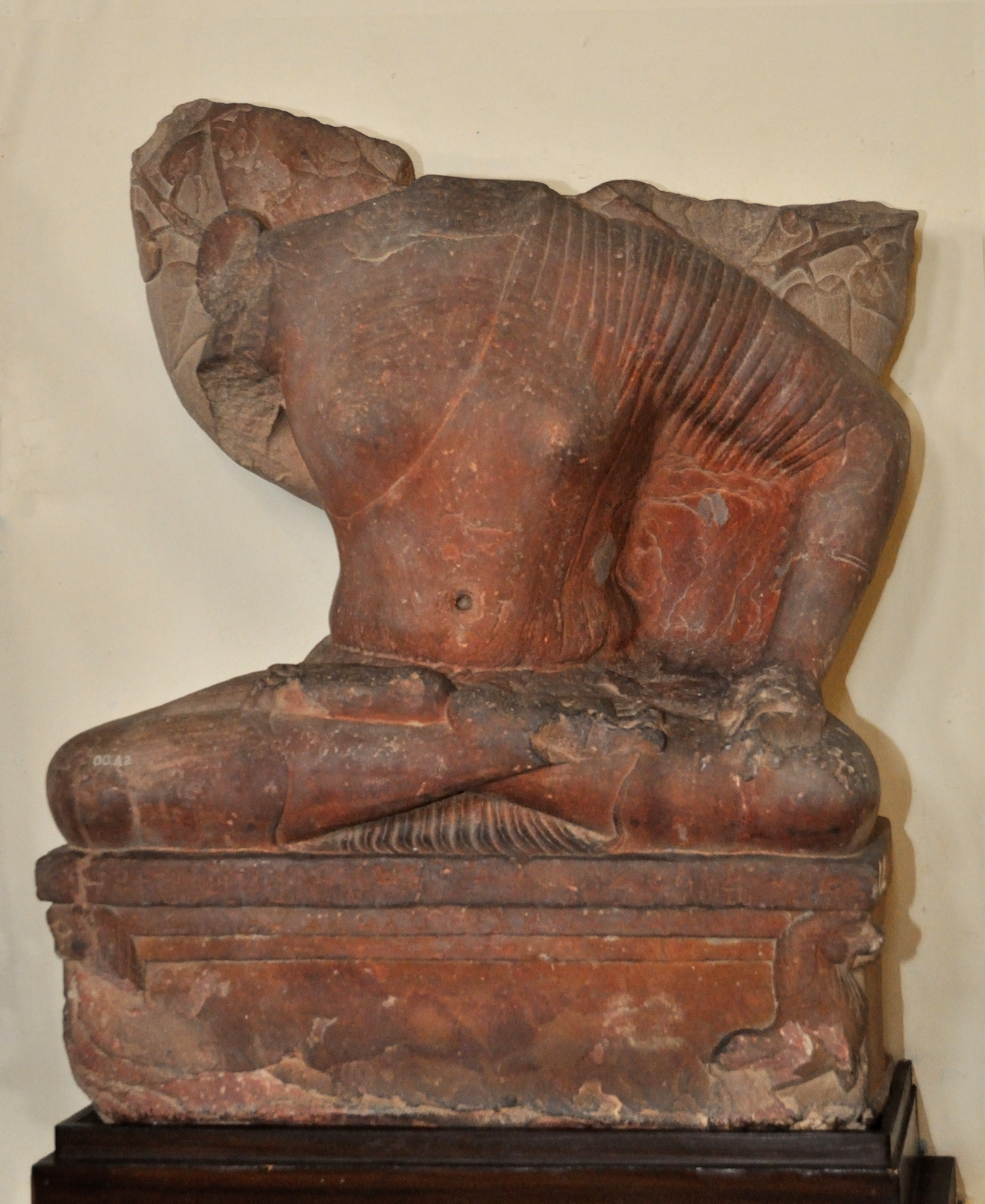
The "Anyor Buddha": one of the two known "Kapardin" statues mentioning "the Buddha": "Susha (...) gave this Buddha image",

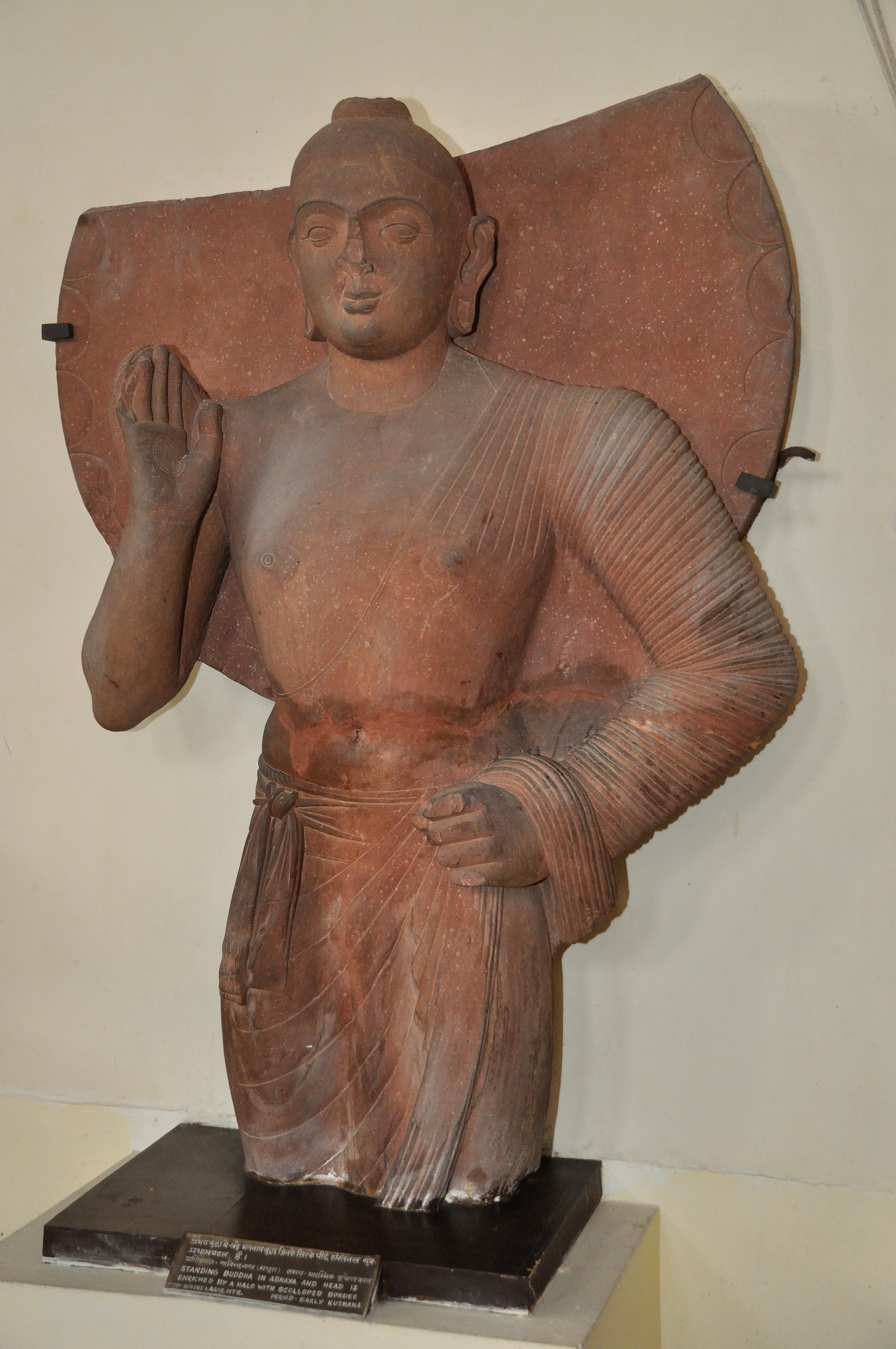
Standing Buddha of the "Kapardin" type. Early Kushan period.

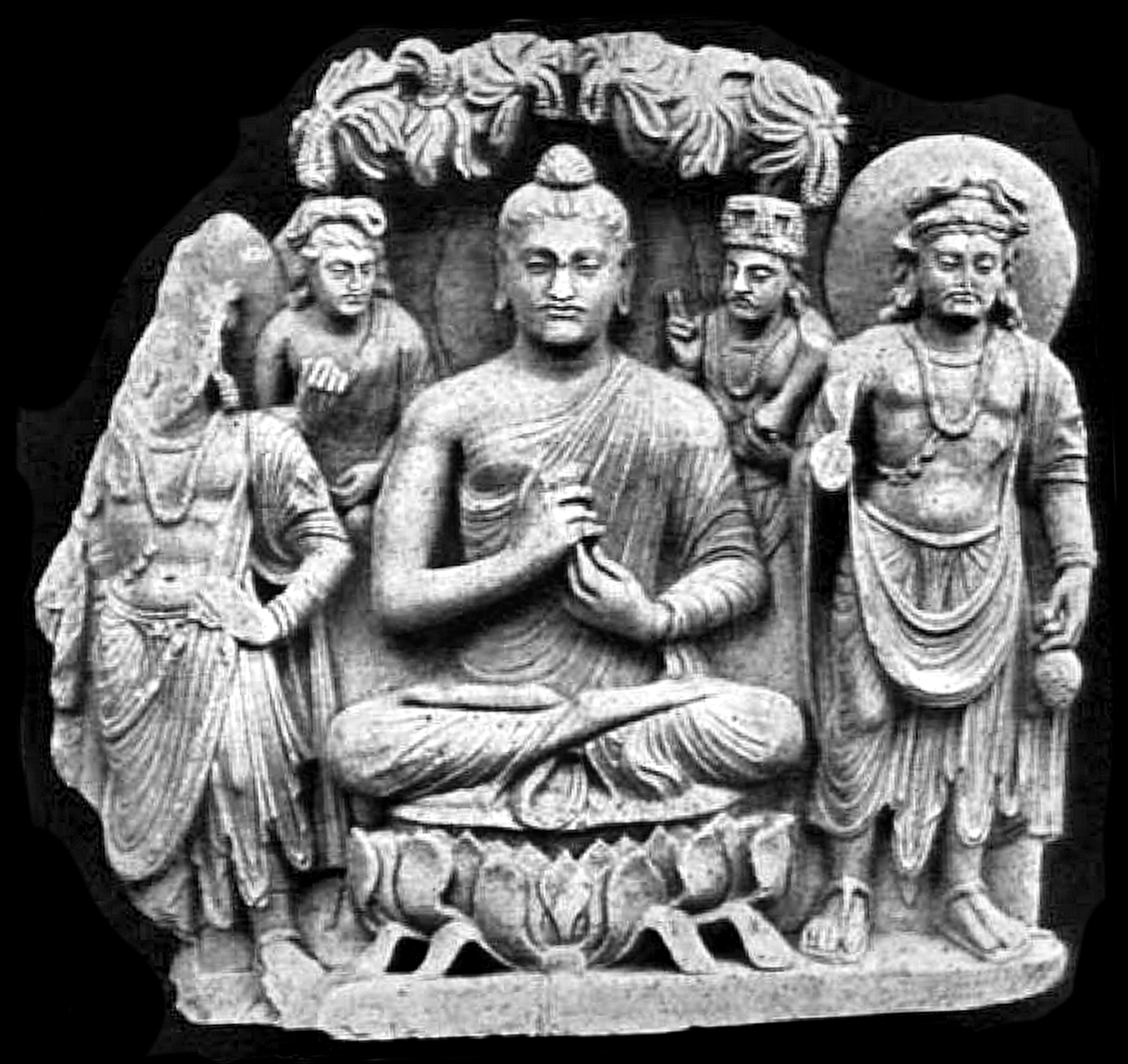
Type of the Brussels Buddha, a similar Buddhist triad from Gandhara, probably also dating to the year 5 of Kanishka.

=== Buddha coinage (Circa 130 CE) ===
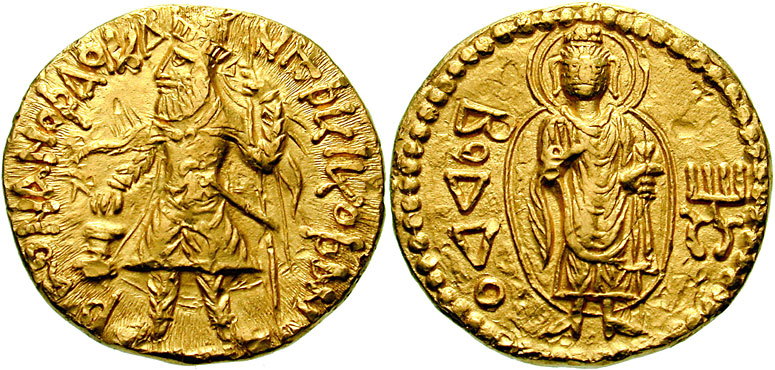
Depiction of the Buddha (with legend in Greek ΒΟΔΔΟ "Boddo") on the reverse of Kanishka's coinage (127–150 CE).

From his capital of Mathura or alternatively from the capital of his territories of the northwest, Peshawar, Kanishka issued the first known representation of the Buddha on a coin, and actually one of the first known representations of the Buddha that can be dated precisely, in this case, to the reign of Kanishka (127–150 CE). The Bimaran casket is usually dated to 50 CE, but with less certainty than the Kanishka coin.

Only six Kushan coins of the Buddha are known in gold (the sixth one is the centerpiece of an ancient piece of jewellery, consisting of a Kanishka Buddha coin decorated with a ring of heart-shaped ruby stones). All these coins were minted in gold under Kanishka I, and are in two different denominations: a dinar of about 8 gm, roughly similar to a Roman aureus, and a quarter dinar of about 2 gm. (about the size of an obol). The Buddha is represented wearing the monastic robe, the antaravasaka, the uttarasanga, and the overcoat sanghati. In general, the representation of the Buddha on these coins is already highly symbolic, and quite distinct from the more naturalistic and Hellenistic images seen in early Gandhara sculptures. On several designs a mustache is apparent. The palm of his right hand bears the Chakra mark, and his brow bear the urna. An aureola, formed by one, two or three lines, surrounds him. The full gown worn by the Buddha on the coins, covering both shoulders, suggests a Gandharan model rather than a Mathuran one, and the style is clearly Hellenistic.

Kanishka also issued other types of Buddhist coinage, representation a "Shakyamuni Buddha" standing and walking, as well as a seated "Maitreya Buddha". It should be noted however that Maitreya is a Bodhisattva and not a Buddha according to the Buddhist cannon.

=== Buddha statues in "Samghati" monastic dress (mid-2nd century onward) ===
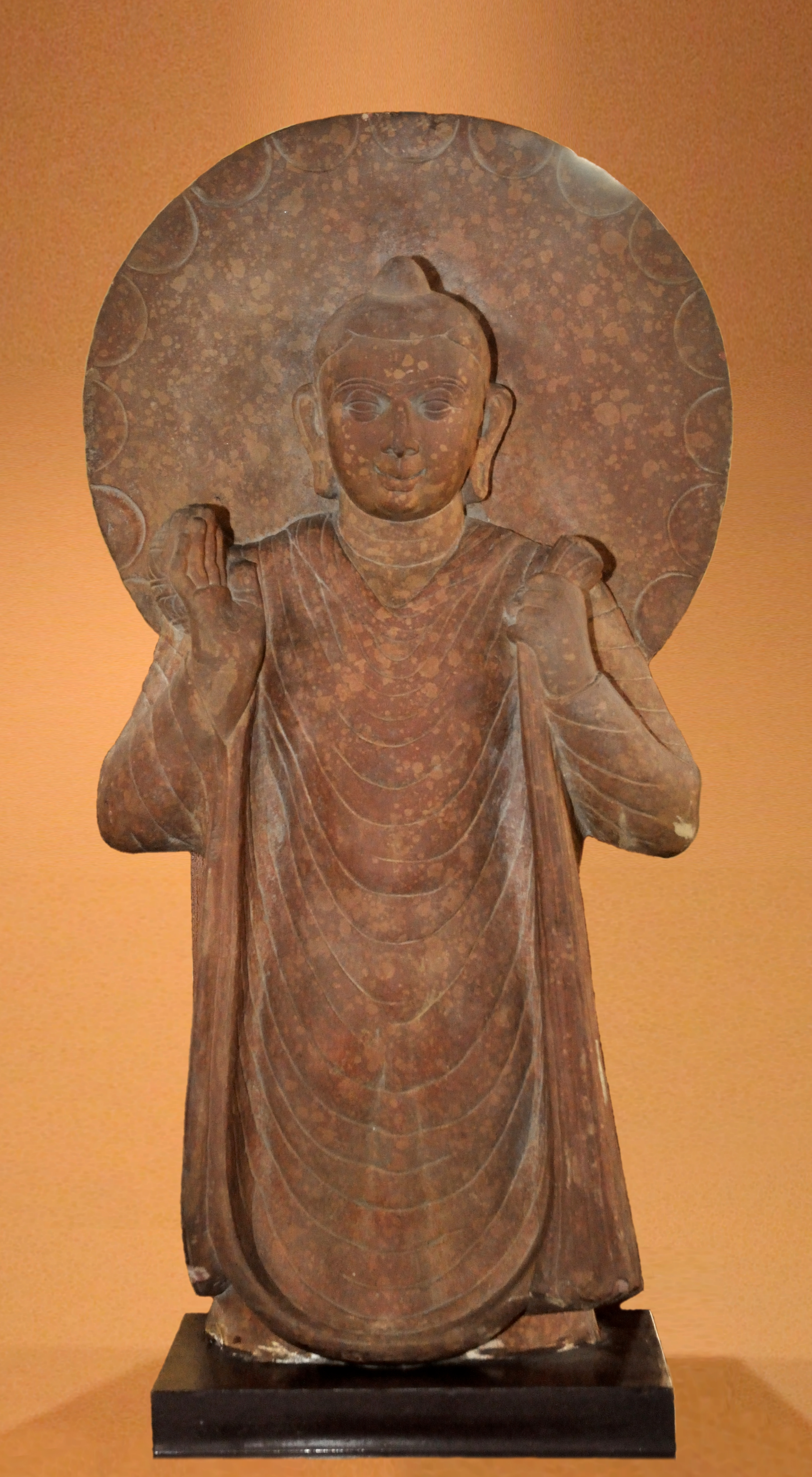
A Mathura standing Buddha in "Samghati" monastic dress, c. 2nd century CE, Mathura Museum

The last known inscribed "Kapardin Bodhisattava" statue is dated to the year 39 of the era started by Kanishka (166 CE). From around that time, the art of Mathura adopted the image of the Buddha with the monastic robe covering both shoulders, a likely derivation from the art of Gandhara. Statues from the art of Gandhara, dating to the 1st–2nd century CE, have been found in Mathura, such as the Saptarishi Tila statue, suggesting they may have influenced local art.

When inscribed, these standing statues mention the "Buddha" rather than the "Bodhisattva". Several are dated to the 2nd century CE, and became the prevalent Buddha type, displaying characteristics which would later be seen in Gupta art, especially with the ever thinner monastic dress seemingly sticking to the body of the Buddha. These statues of the Buddha display characteristics and attitudes seen in the Greco-Buddhist art of Gandhara: the head of the Buddha is surrounded by a halo, the clothing covers both shoulders, the left hand hold the gown of the Buddha while the other hand form an Abbhiya mudra, and the folds in the clothing are more typical of the Gandharan styles.

In many respect, the standing Buddha of Mathura seems to be a combination of the local sculptural tradition initiated by the Yakshas with the Hellenistic designs of the Buddhas from the Greco-Buddhist art of Gandhara.

From this period, the quality of the sculptures starts to decrease, possibly owing to the progressive decline of the Kushan Empire.

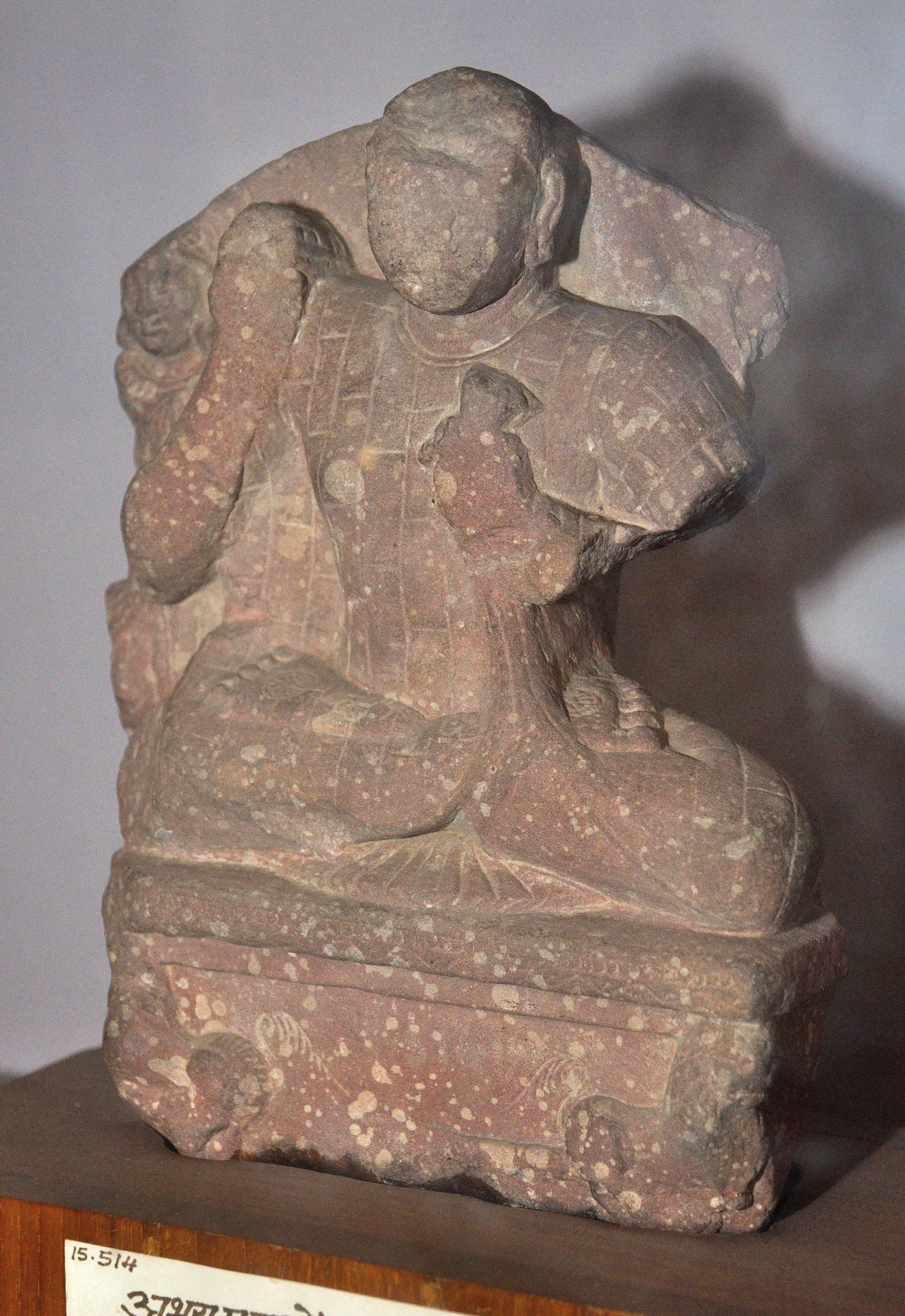
"Maholi Buddha": an early experiment with the "Samghati" type, using a checkered design, circa 150 CE.

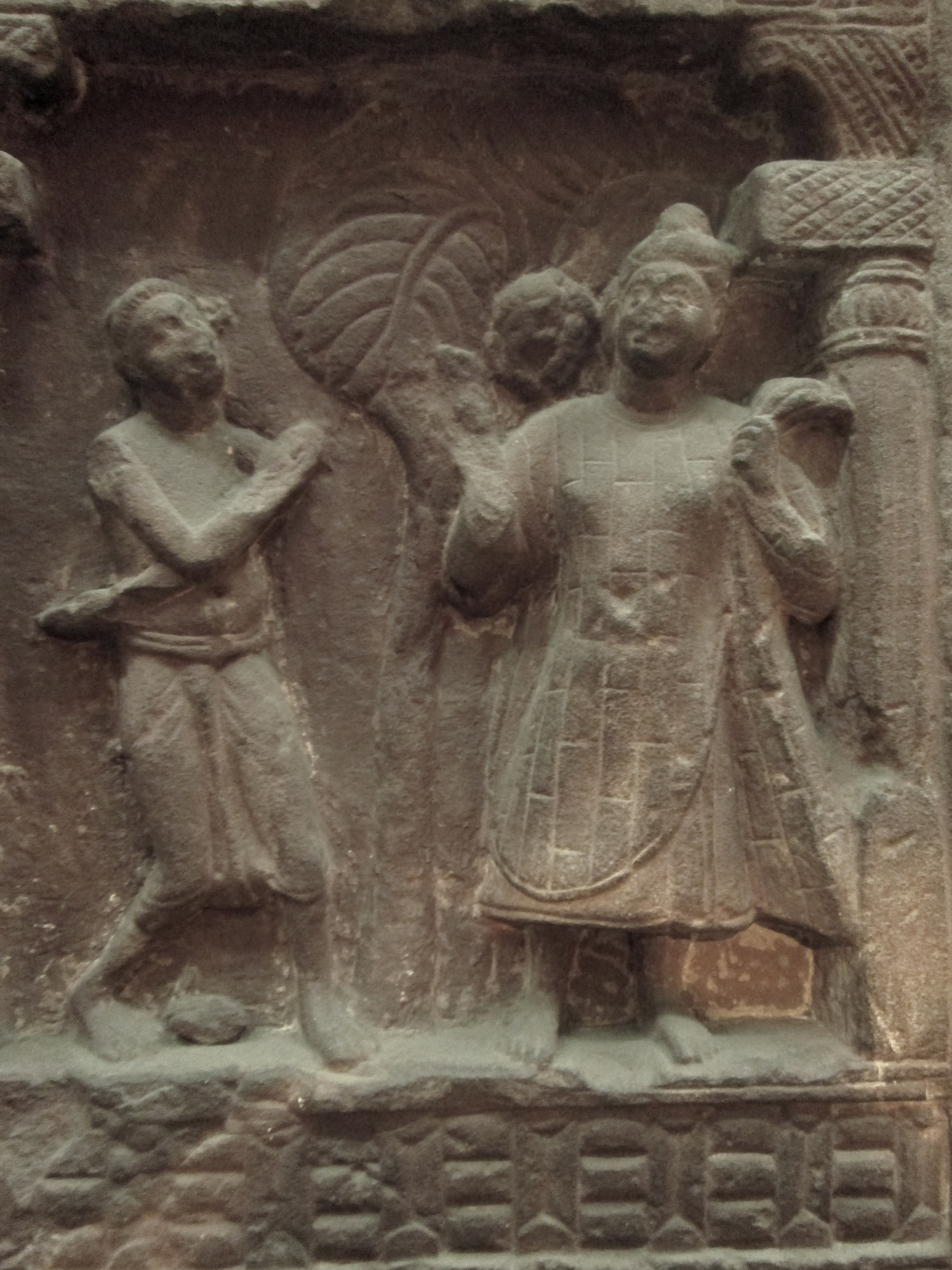
The Buddha in checkered monastic dress in the "Subjugation of Nalagiri", Bhutesvara Yakshis, 2nd century CE, Mathura.

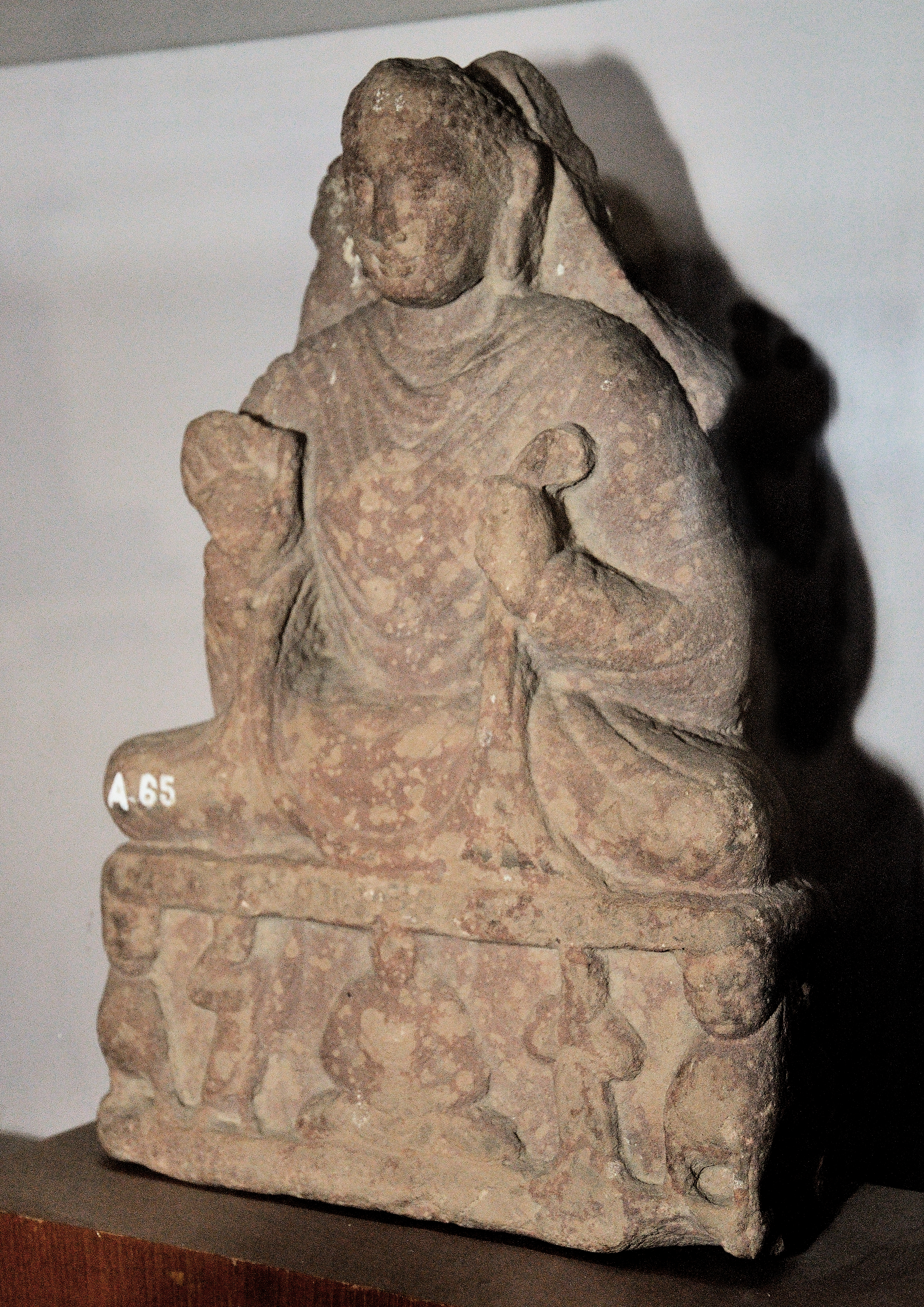
"Anyor Buddha" in Gandhara style, with inscription "year 51" (178 CE). Mathura.

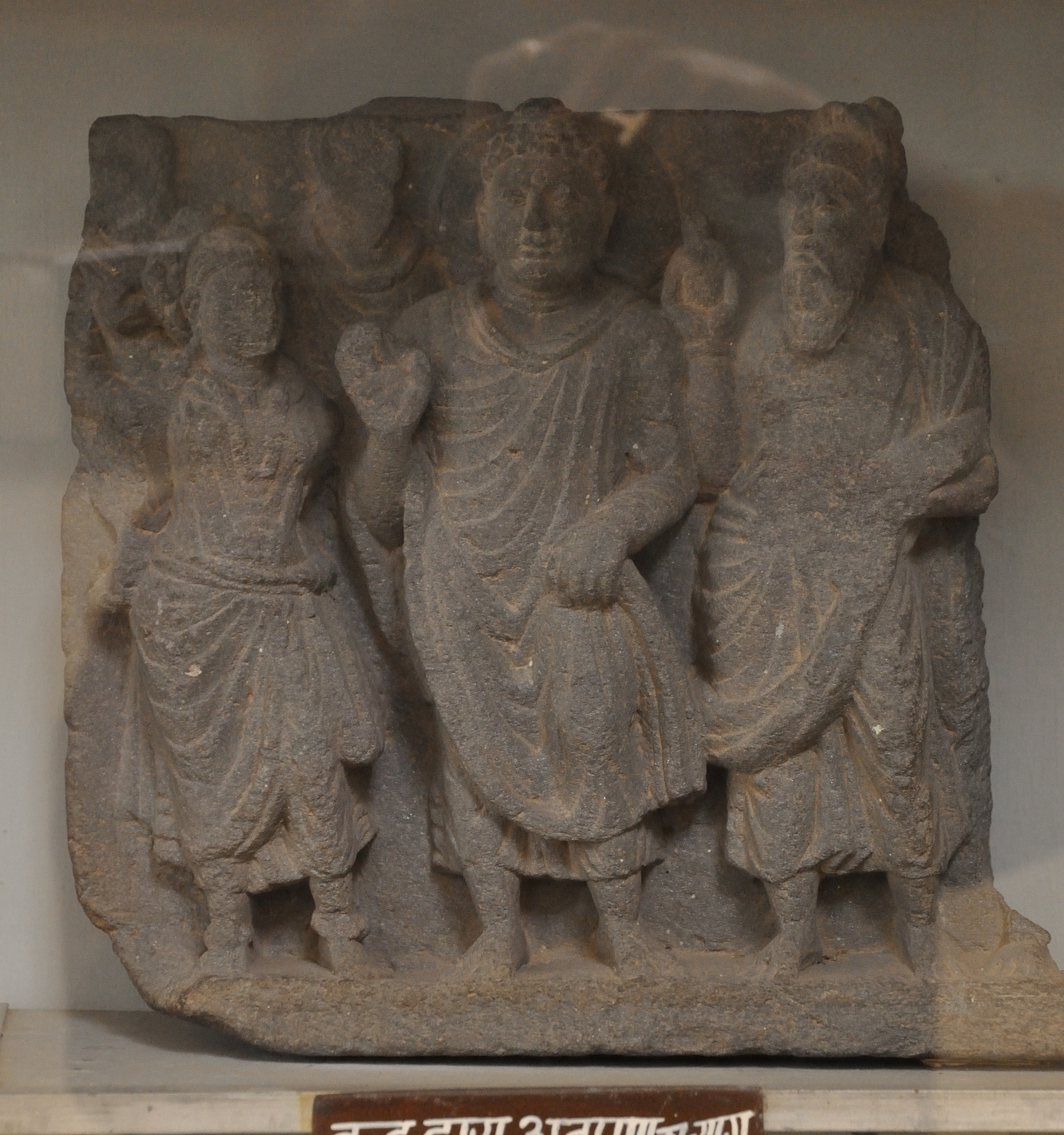
"Buddha Refuses Anupama", late Kushan.

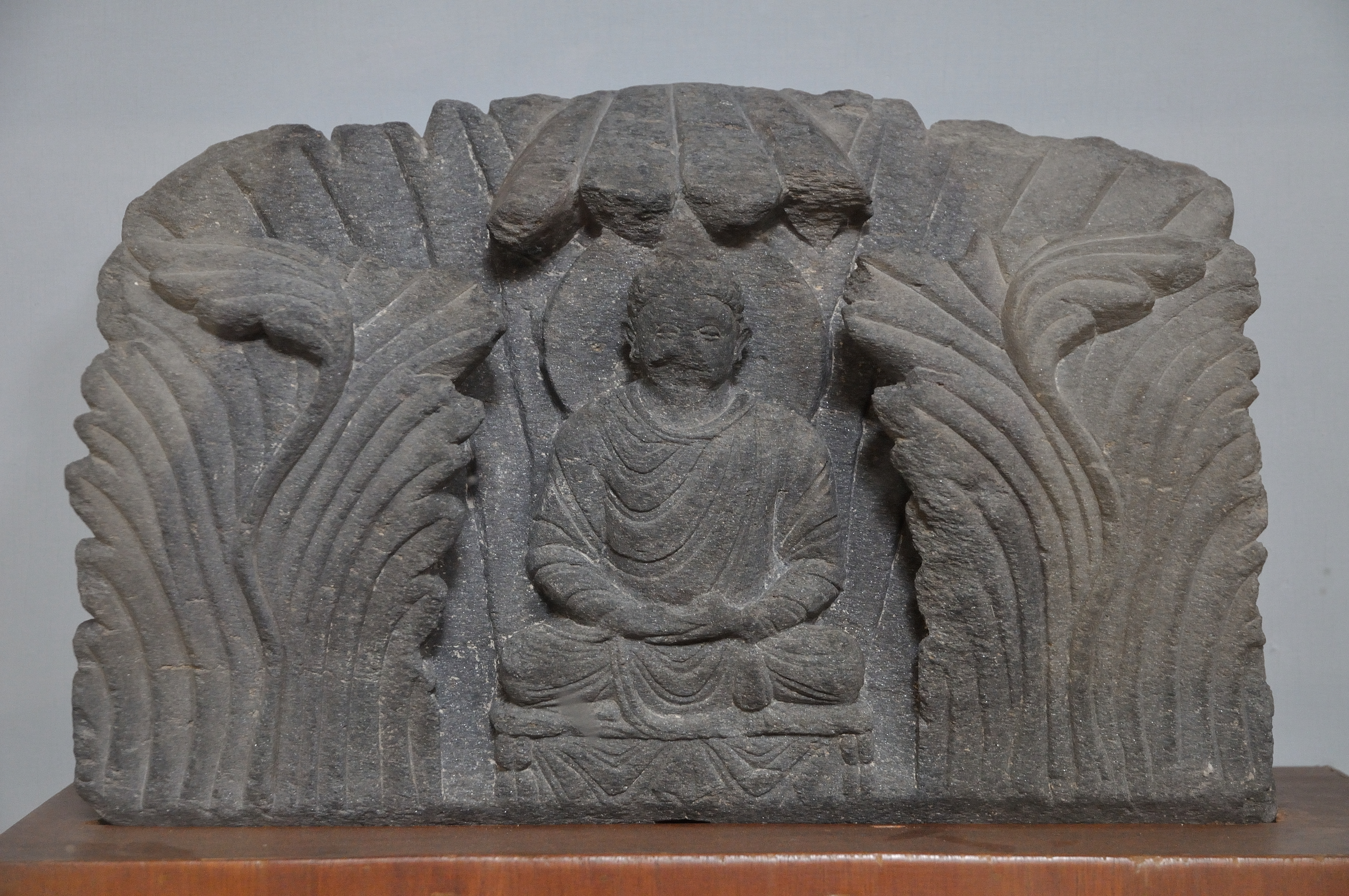
The Buddha in meditation, late Kushan. Mathura.

=== First known Mahayana inscriptions and sculptures (153 CE) ===
Earliest Mahayana inscription
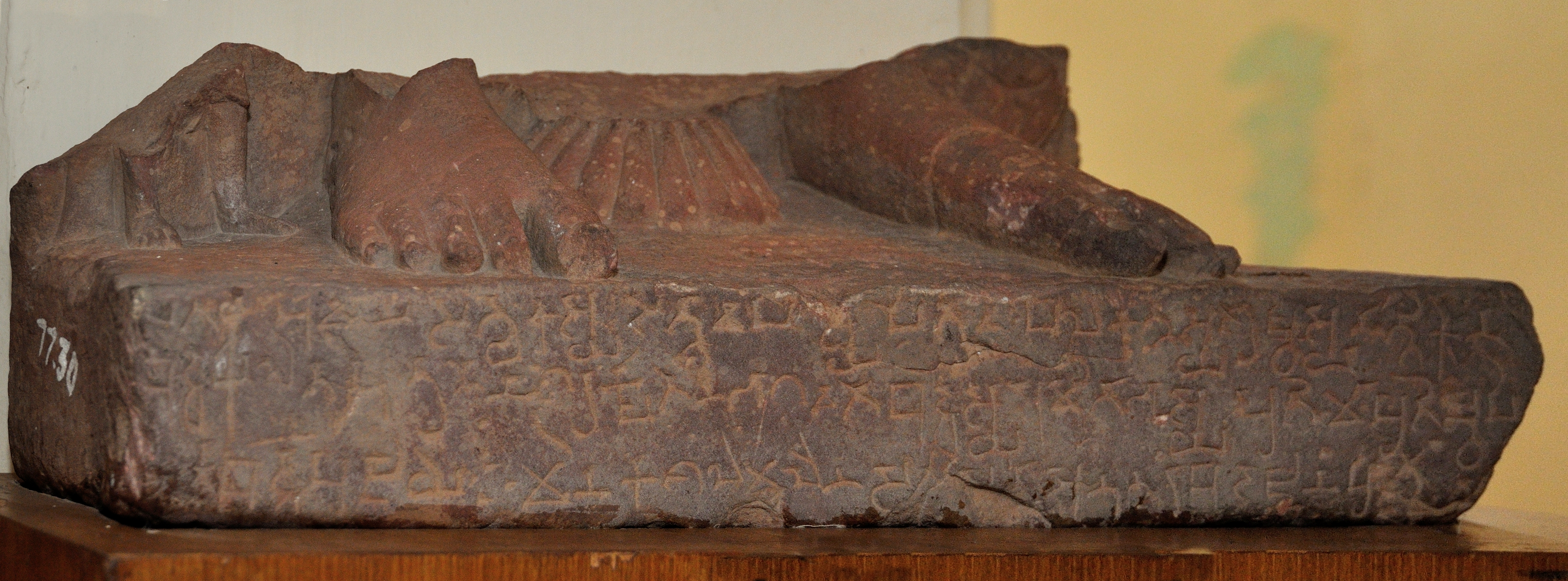
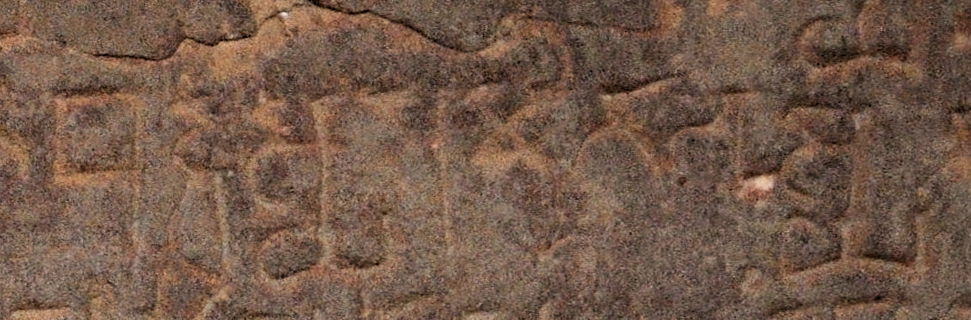
Earliest known Mahayana inscription: inscribed pedestal with the first known occurrence of the name of "Amitabha Buddha" in the "year 26 of Huvishka" (153 CE) In Brahmi script in the inscription:

"Bu-ddha-sya A-mi-tā-bha-sya"
"Of the Buddha Amitabha"

The earliest known inscription related to the Mahayana branch of Buddhism also appears around this time, with the inscribed pedestal of a standing Bodhisattva with the first known occurrence of the name of "Amitabha Buddha" in the "year 26 of Huvishka" (153 CE). The remains of the statue were found in Govindnagar, on the outskirts of Mathura. The relevant passage of the inscription unambiguously reads "Bu-ddha-sya A-mi-tā-bha-sya" in Brahmi script.

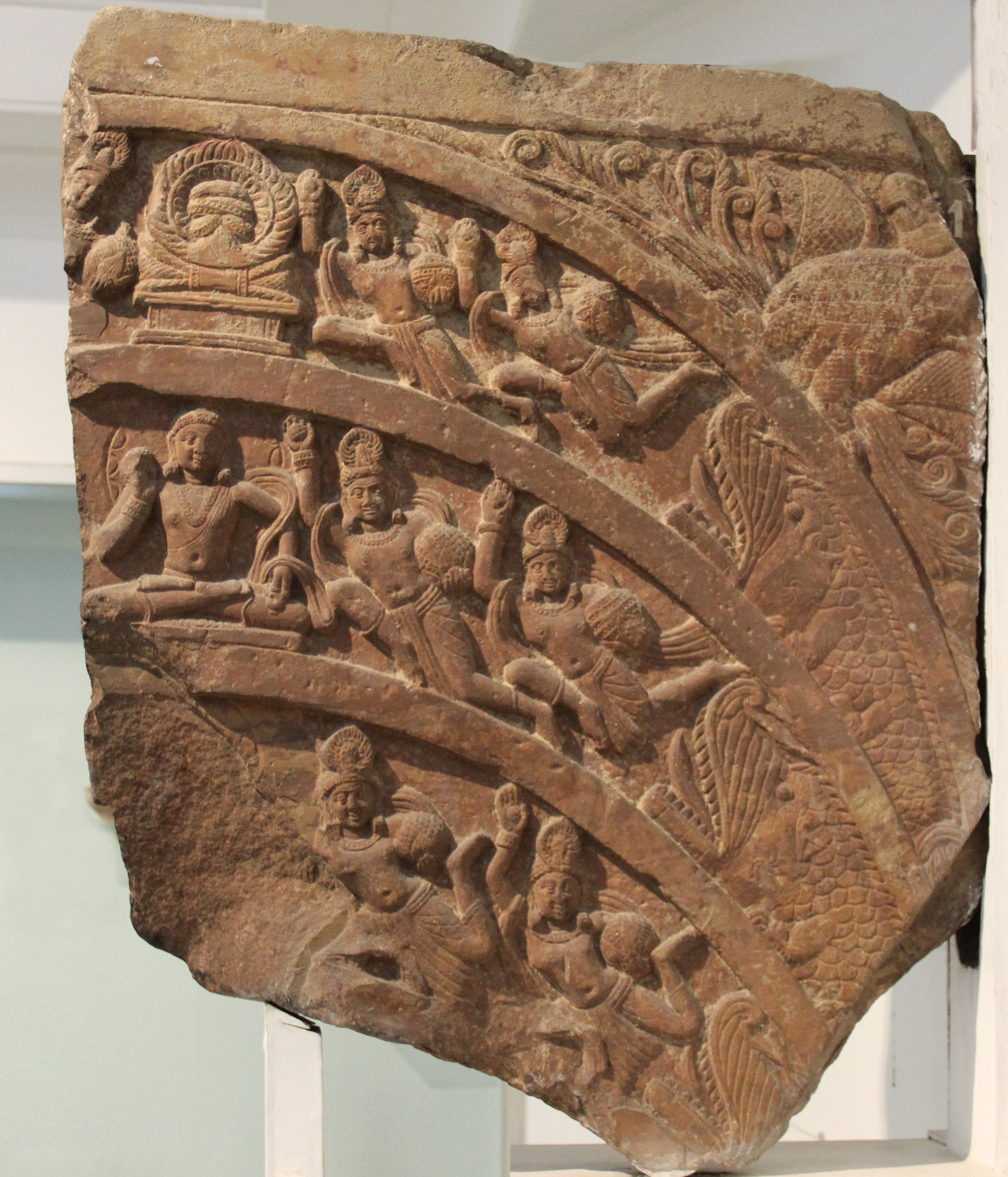
Decorated tympanum showing the Bodhisattva Maitreya, from Jamalpur Tila, Mathura, 150 CE.

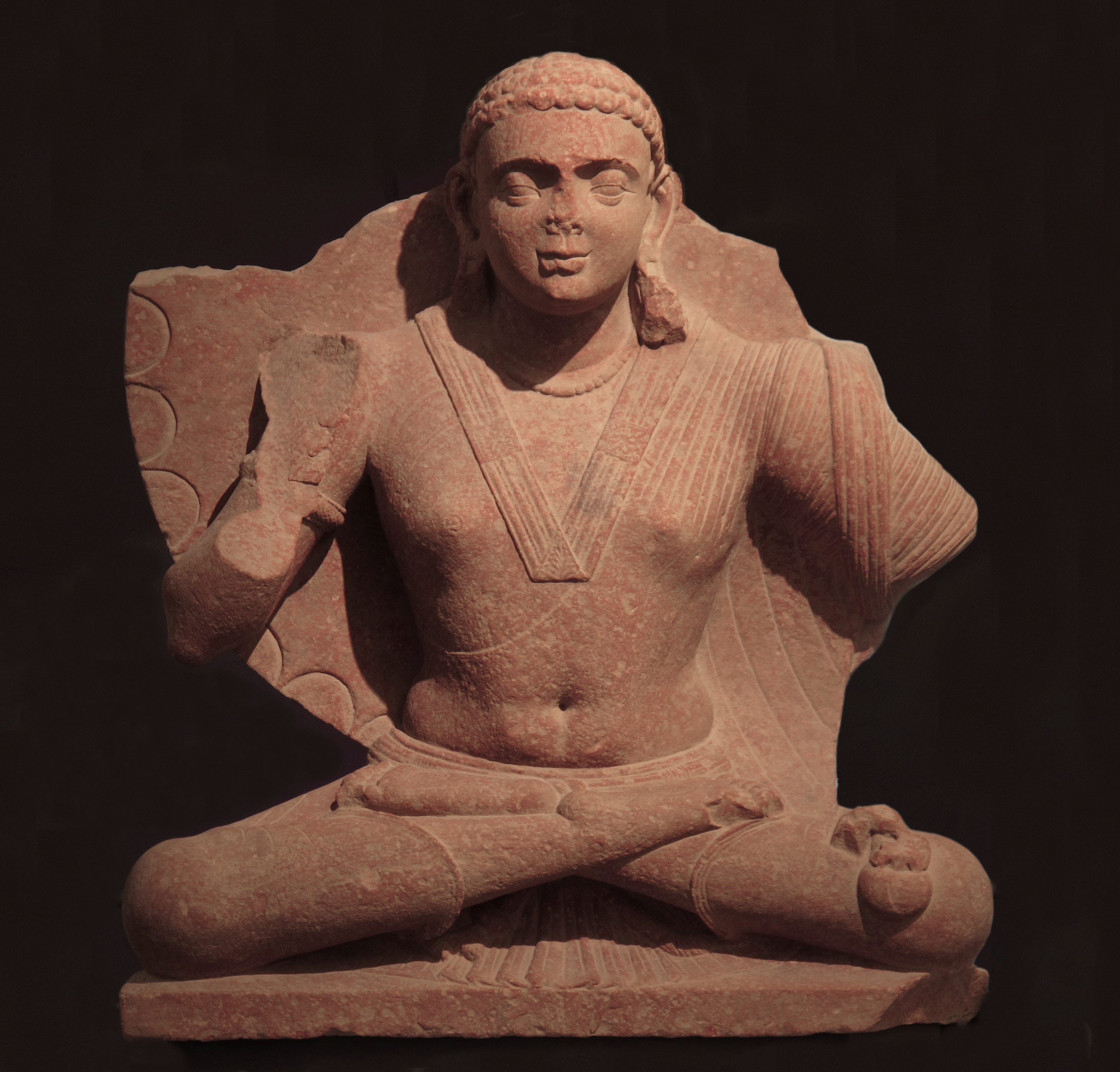
Bodhisattva Maitreya (water bottle on left thigh), Mathura, 2nd century CE.

=== Ornate Bodhisattvas (2nd–4th century CE) ===
Ornate Bodhisattvas

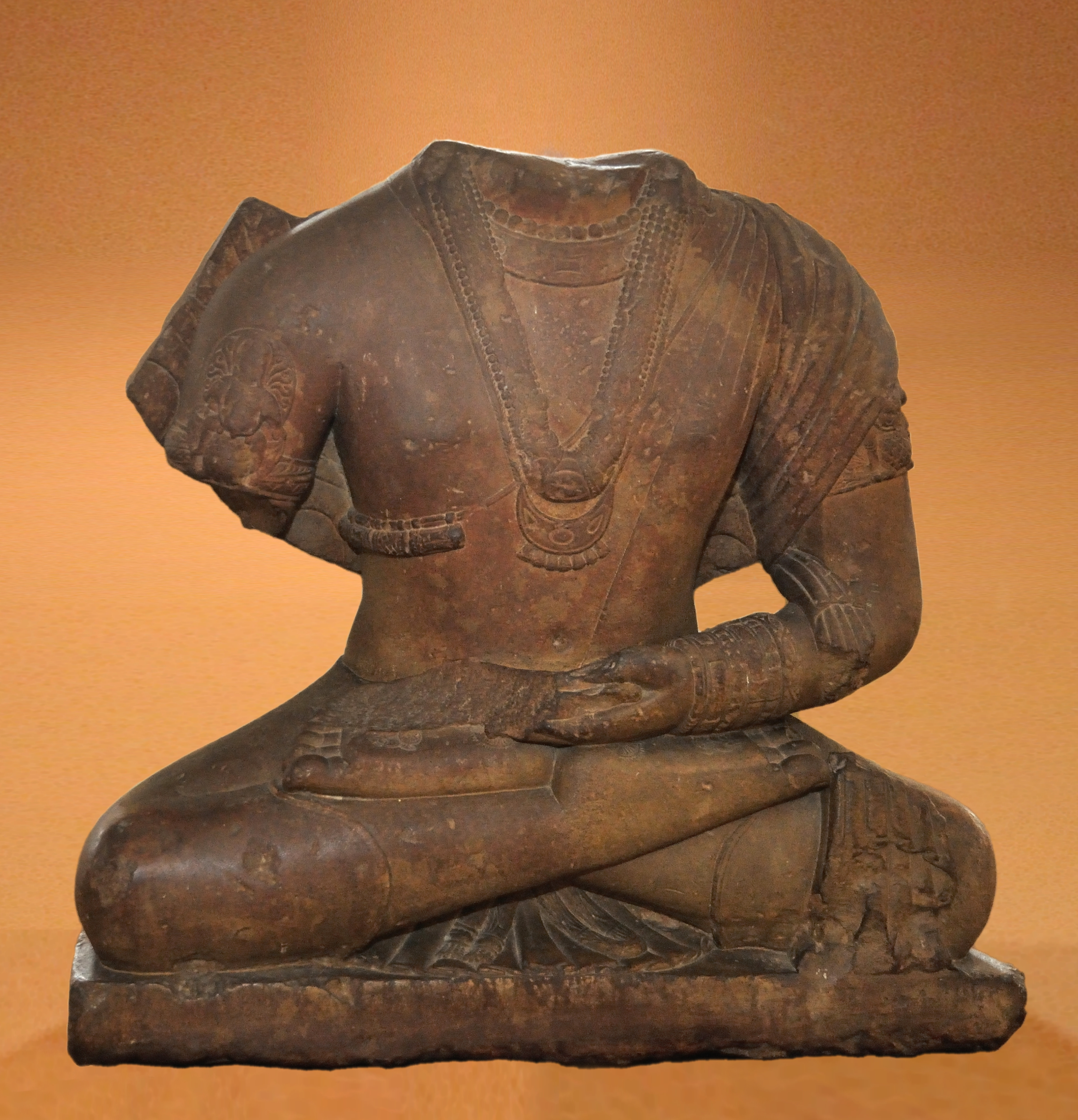
Ornate seated Bodhisattva, with abundant jewelry. Mathura, 2nd c. CE

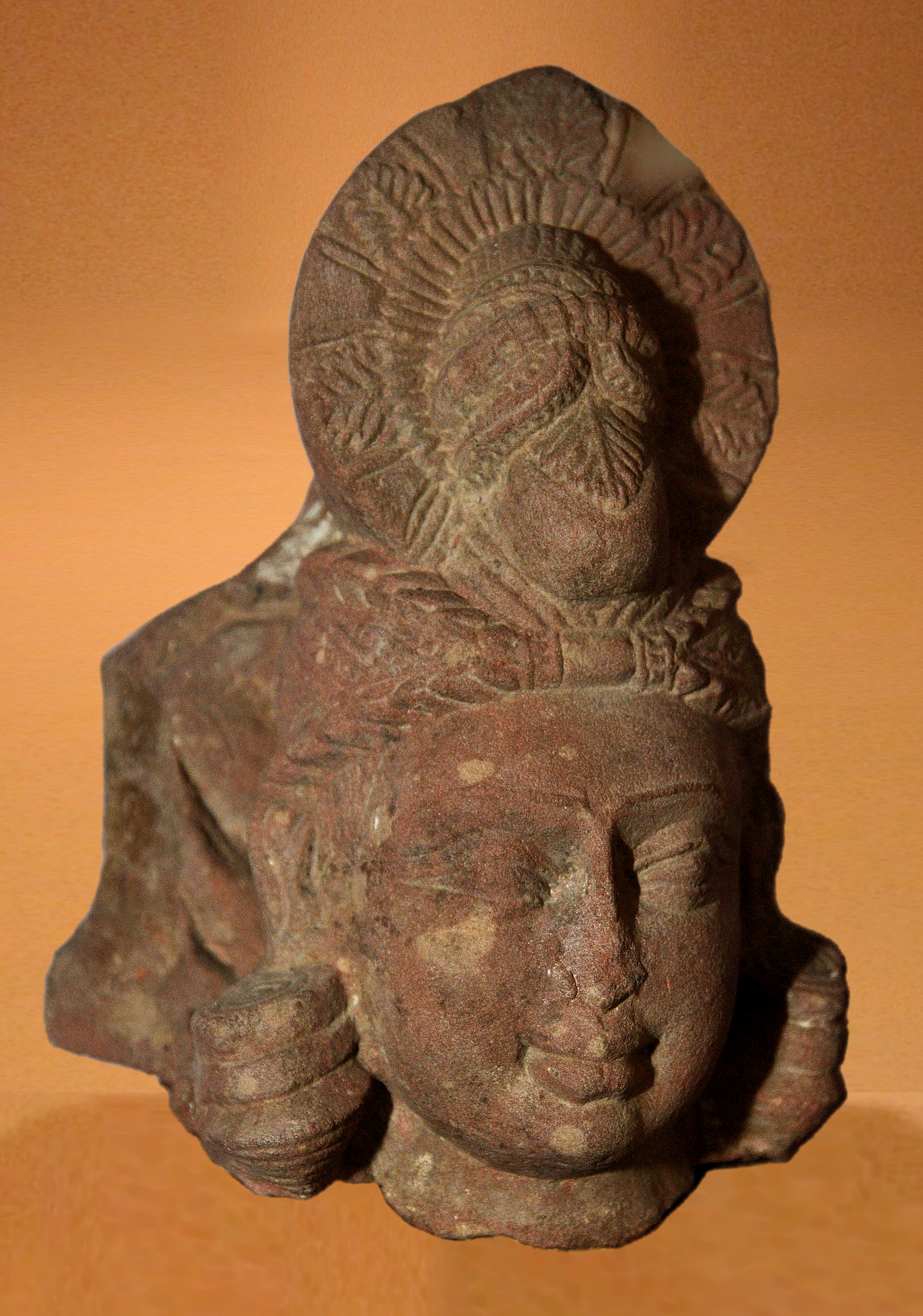
Head fragment, Mathura, 2nd–3rd c. CE

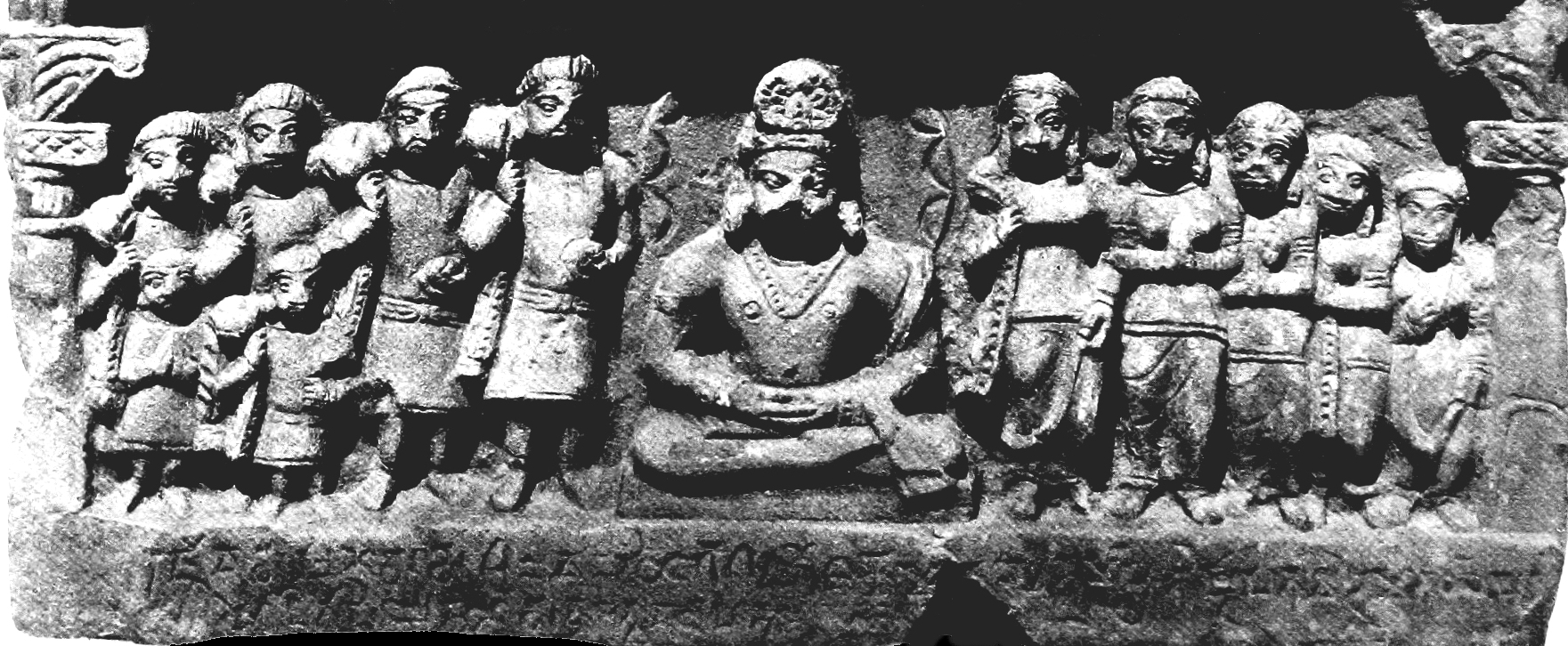
Kushan devotees around bejeweled Bodhisattva. Statue pedestal inscribed "Year 22 of Vaskushana", thought to be Kushan Emperor Vasishka (ruled c. 247–265 CE).

A later type of ornate Bodhisattvas is known, seen in seated or standing statuary, which seems closely related to the bejeweled princely types of Bodhisattvas seen in the art of Gandhara. A dated statue of this type bears an inscription in the "Year 28 of the Kushan Emperor Vasishka", who ruled circa 247–265 CE. The jewelry of these Bodhisattva statues includes heavy necklaces, ornate turbans, bejeweled armbands, a string across the chest with small reliquaries. The types of princely ornaments of these statues were adopted for the depiction of Hindu gods Vishnu or Surya in the following period.

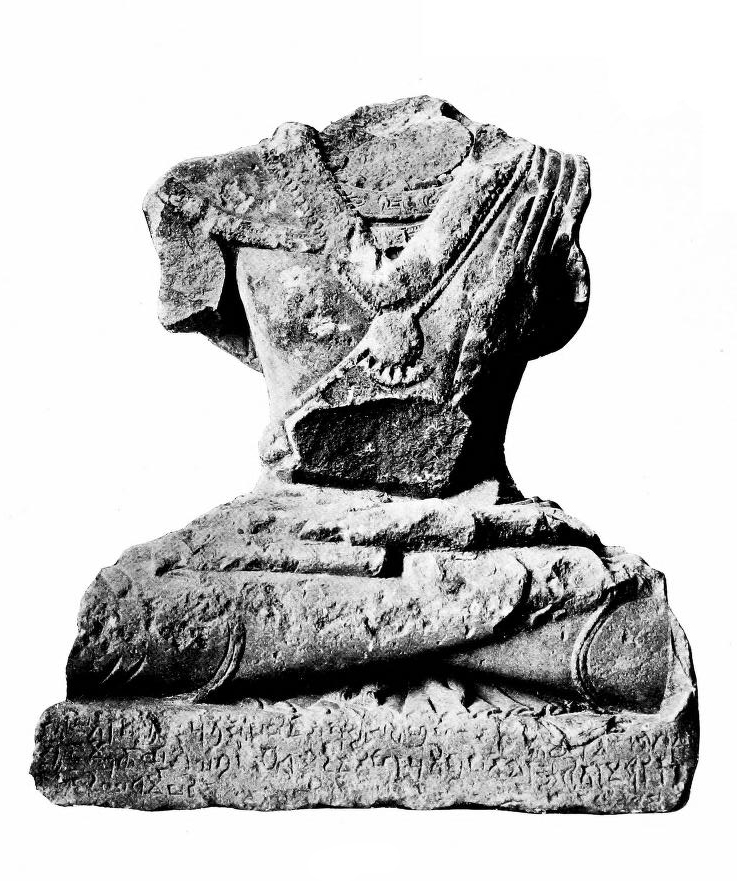
Ornate Bodhisattva with inscription of "Year 28 of Kushan King Vasishka".

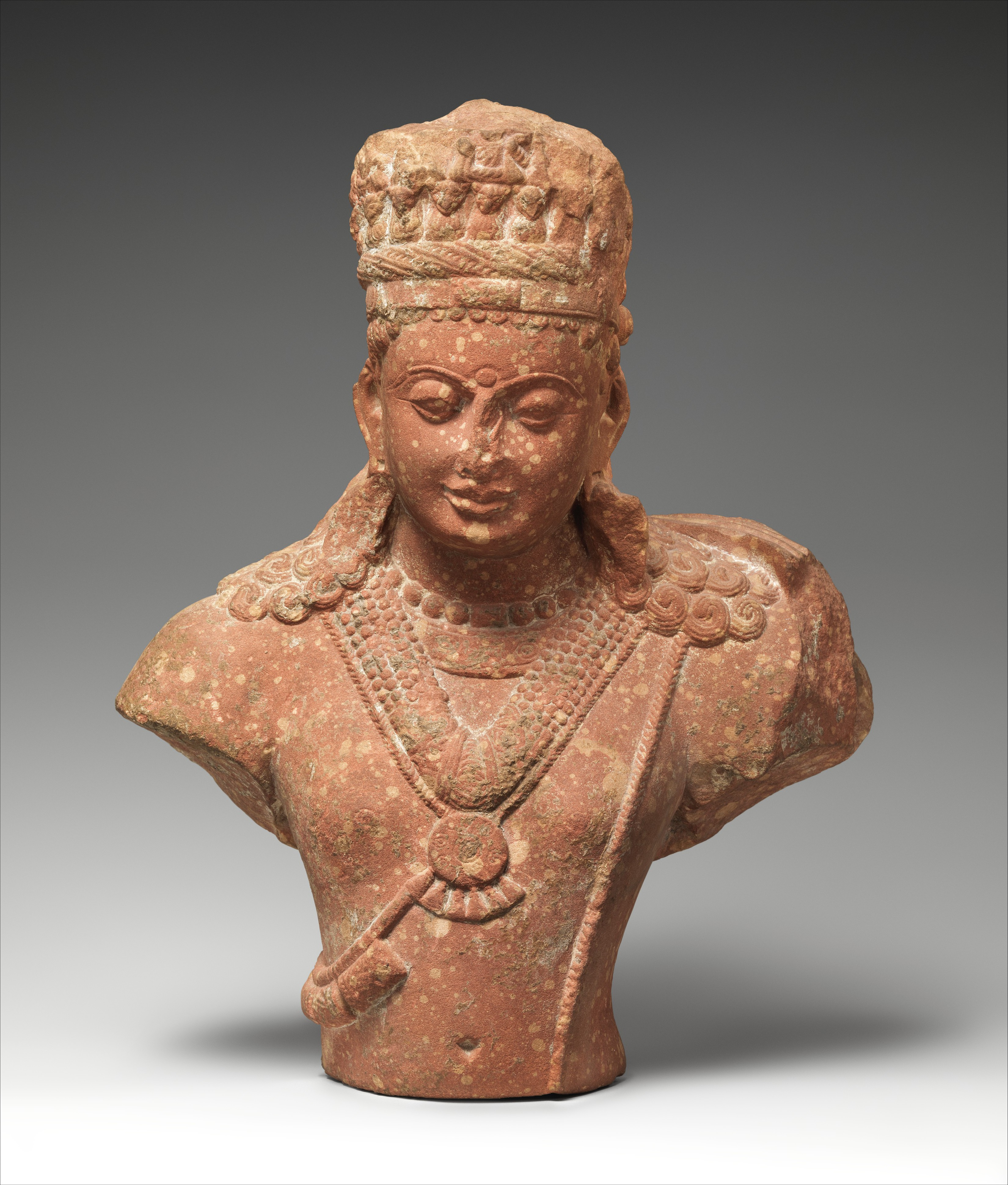
Bejewelled Bodhisattva, 3rd–early 4th century.

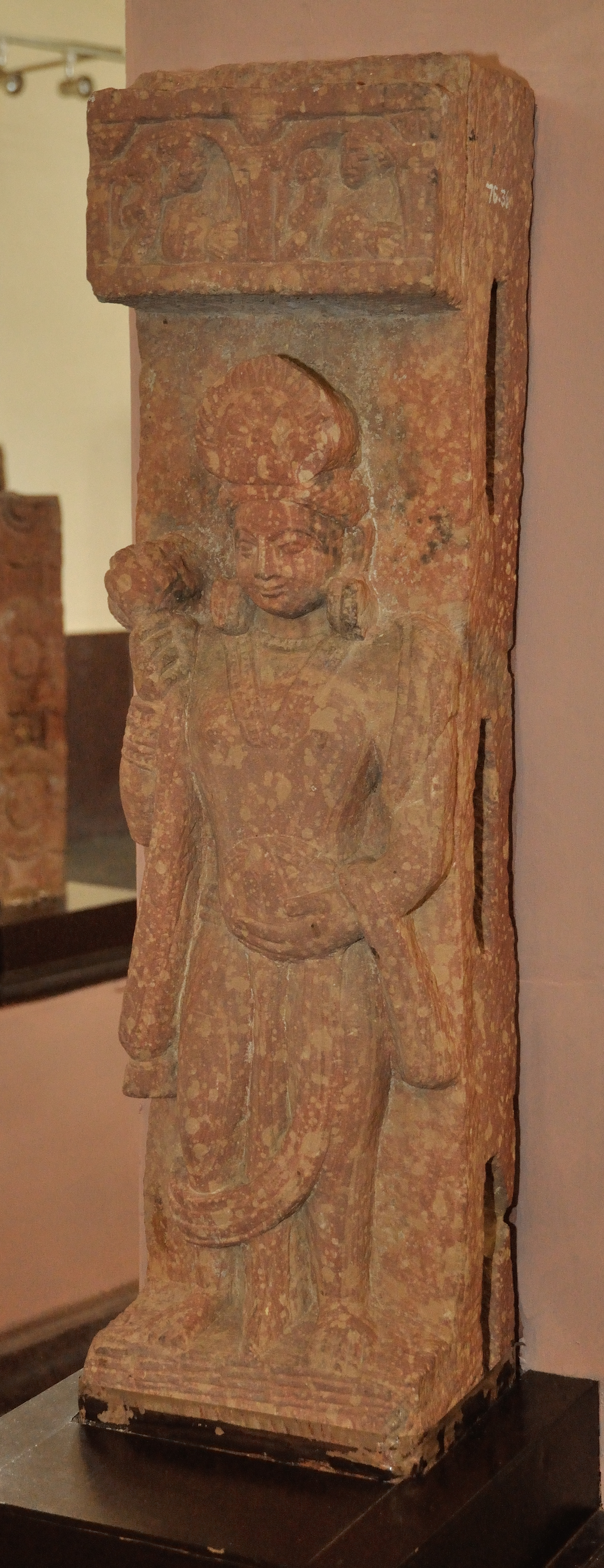
Bodhisattva Avalokitesvara holding lotus flower.

=== Other sculptural works ===
The Mathura sculptures incorporate many Hellenistic elements, such as the general idealistic realism, and key design elements such as the curly hair, and folded garment:

"The second strong element of Mathura art is the free use of the Hellenistic motifs and themes; e.g., the honey-suckle, acanthus, Bacchanalian scenes conceived round an Indianised pot-bellied Kubera, garland-bearing Erotes, Tritons, Heracles and the Nemean Lion, the Eagle of Zeus and the Rape of Ganymede, were strictly classical subjects but rendered in Mathura art with admirable insight and freedom."

— Vasudeva Shrarana Agrawala, Masterpieces of Mathura sculpture.

Specific Mathuran adaptations tend to reflect warmer climatic conditions, as they consist in a higher fluidity of the clothing, which progressively tend to cover only one shoulder instead of both. Also, facial types also tend to become more Indianized. Banerjee in Hellenism in ancient India describes "the mixed character of the Mathura School in which we find on the one hand, a direct continuation of the old Indian art of Barhut and Sanchi and on the other hand, the classical influence derived from Gandhara".

In some cases however, a clear influence from the art of Gandhara can also be felt, as in the case of the Hellenistic statue of Herakles strangling the Nemean lion, discovered in Mathura, and now in the Kolkota Indian Museum, as well as Bacchanalian scenes. Although inspired from the art of Gandhara, the portraiture of Herakles is not perfectly exact and may show a lack of understanding of the subject matter, as Herakles is shown already wearing the skin of the lion he is fighting.

The numerous Bacchanalian scenes with wine drinking and amorous carrousal, also echo similar scenes in the art of Gandhara, and seem to be related to the Dionysiac cult, but represent the Indian god Kubera. Sculptured Bacchanalian panels seem to have functioned as supporting pedestals for offering bowls, as seen from the circular indent carved in the middle of the top area. They were likely set up in or near Buddhist shrines.

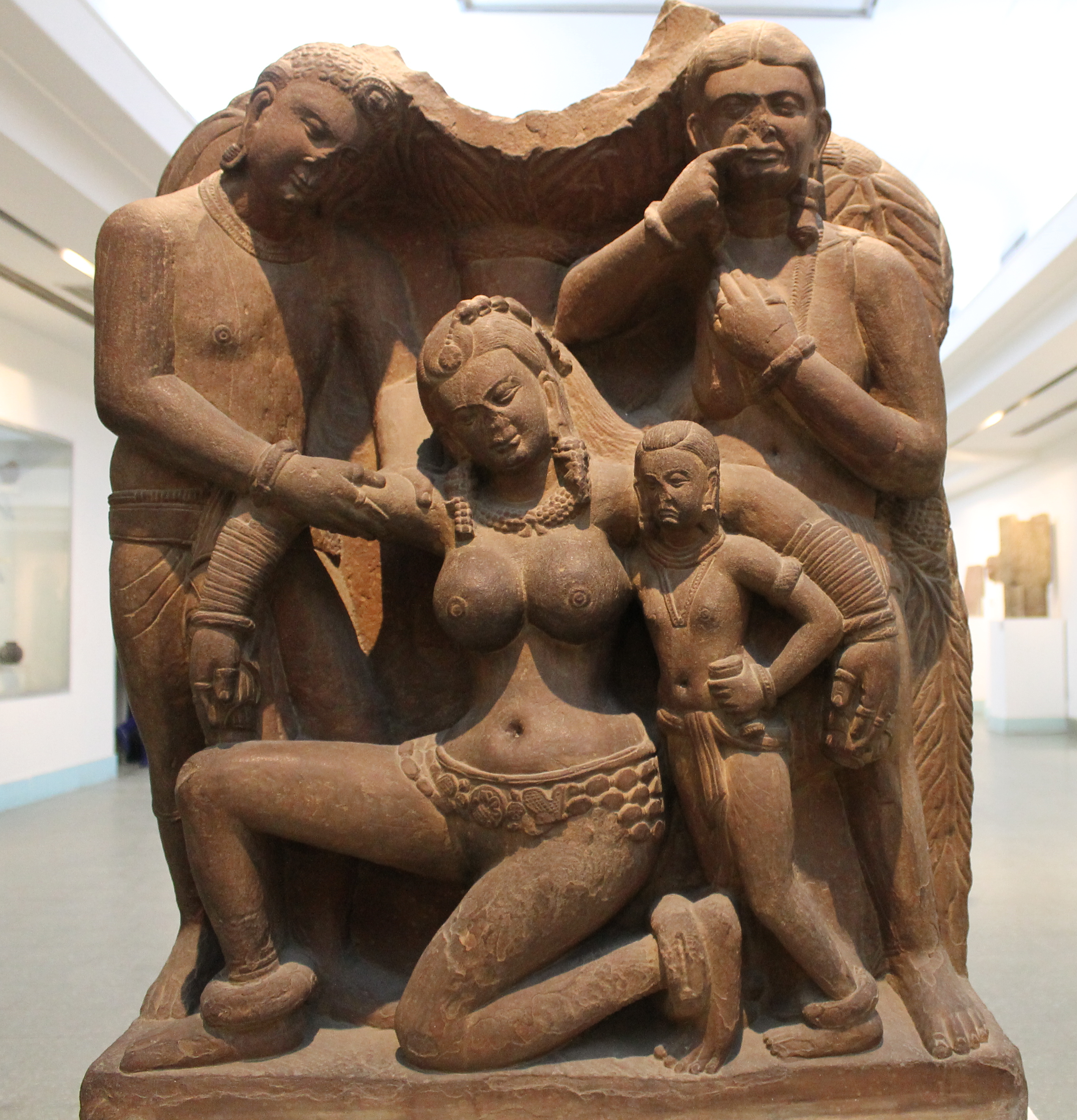
Bacchanalian scene. Mathura

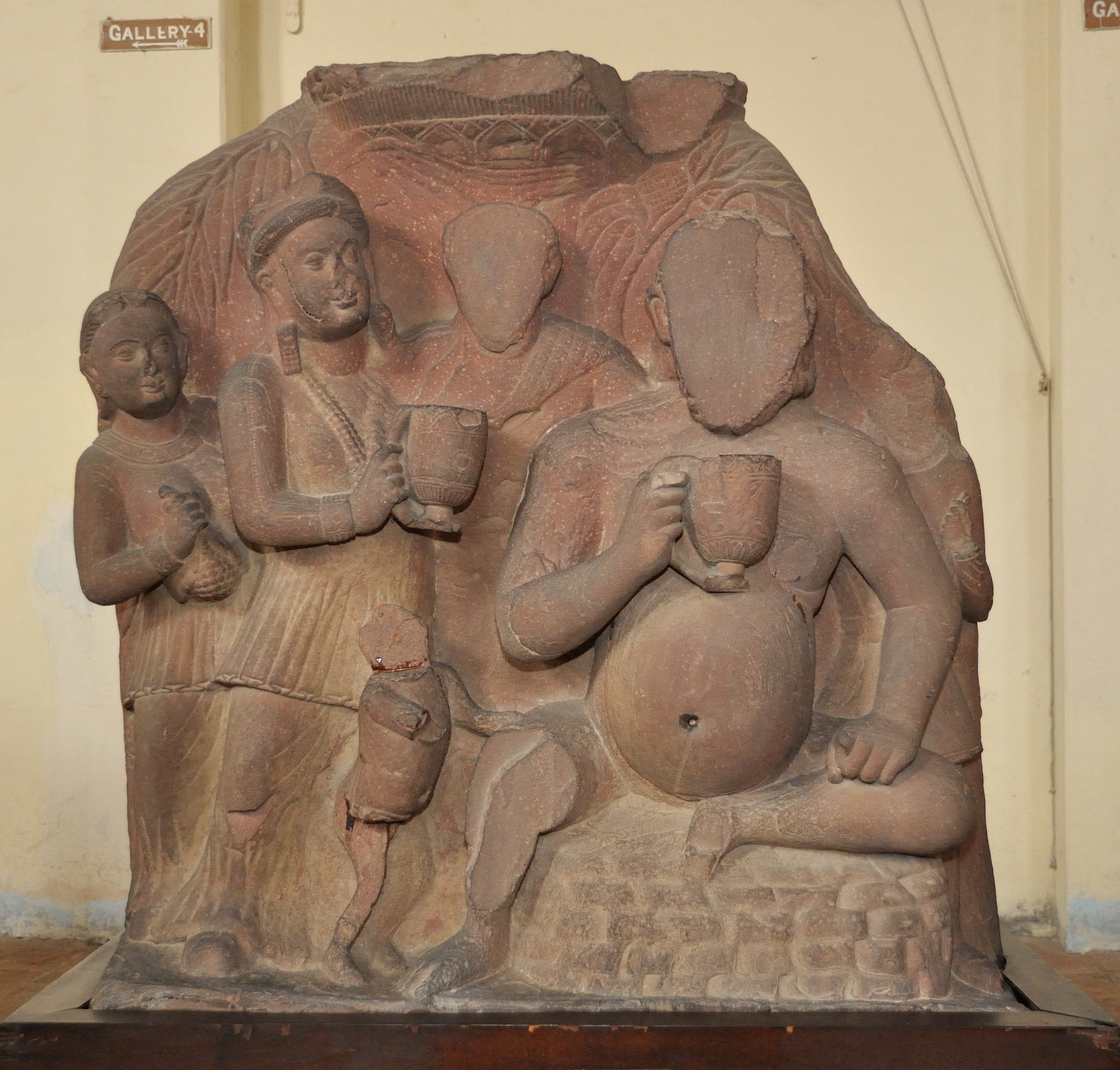
Bacchanalian/ Kubera scene. A man in Scythian/ Kushan costume appears behind Kubera in this scene (on the right)

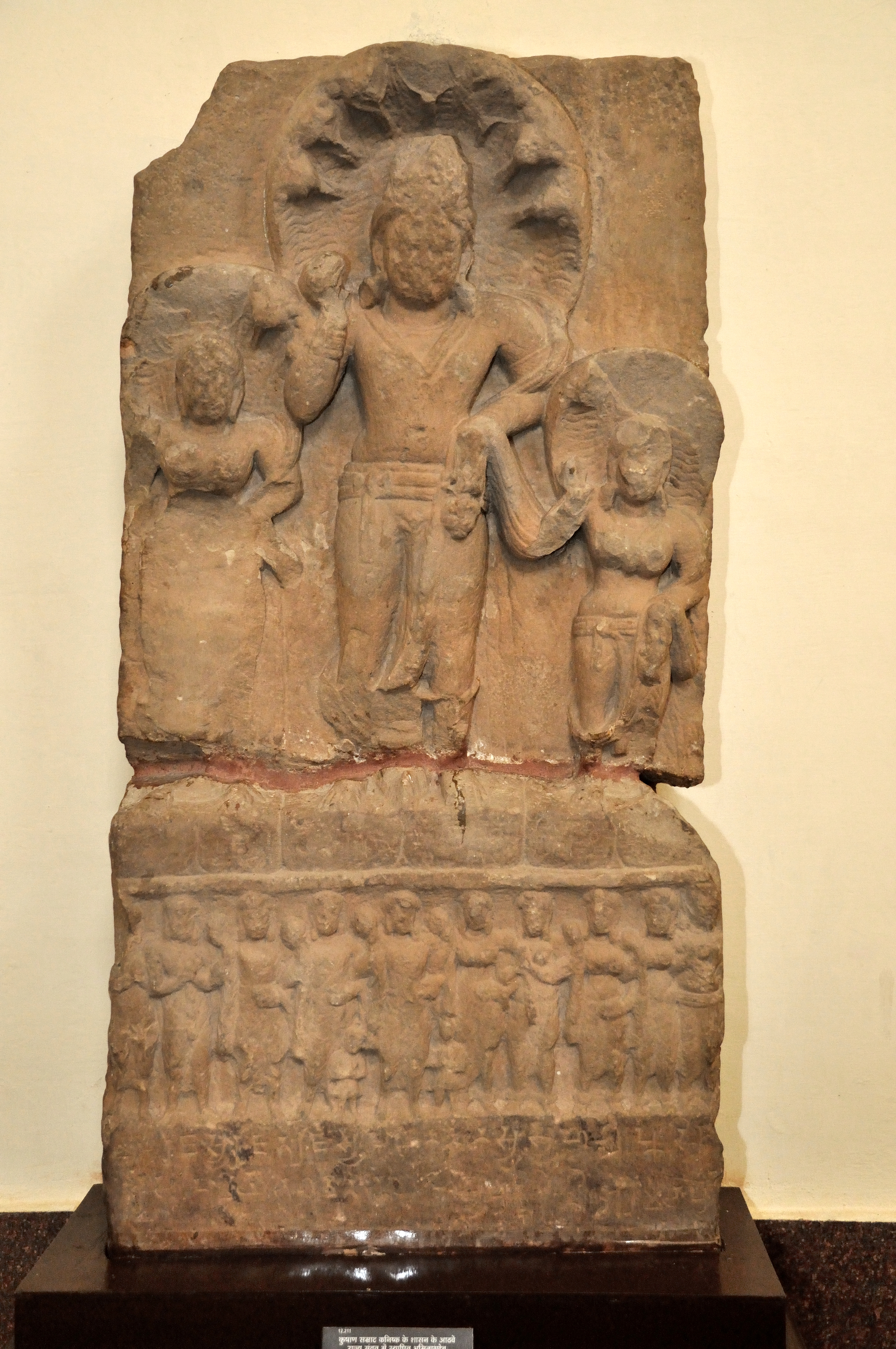
Image of a Nāga between two Nāgīs, inscribed in "the year 8 of Emperor Kanishka". 135 CE.

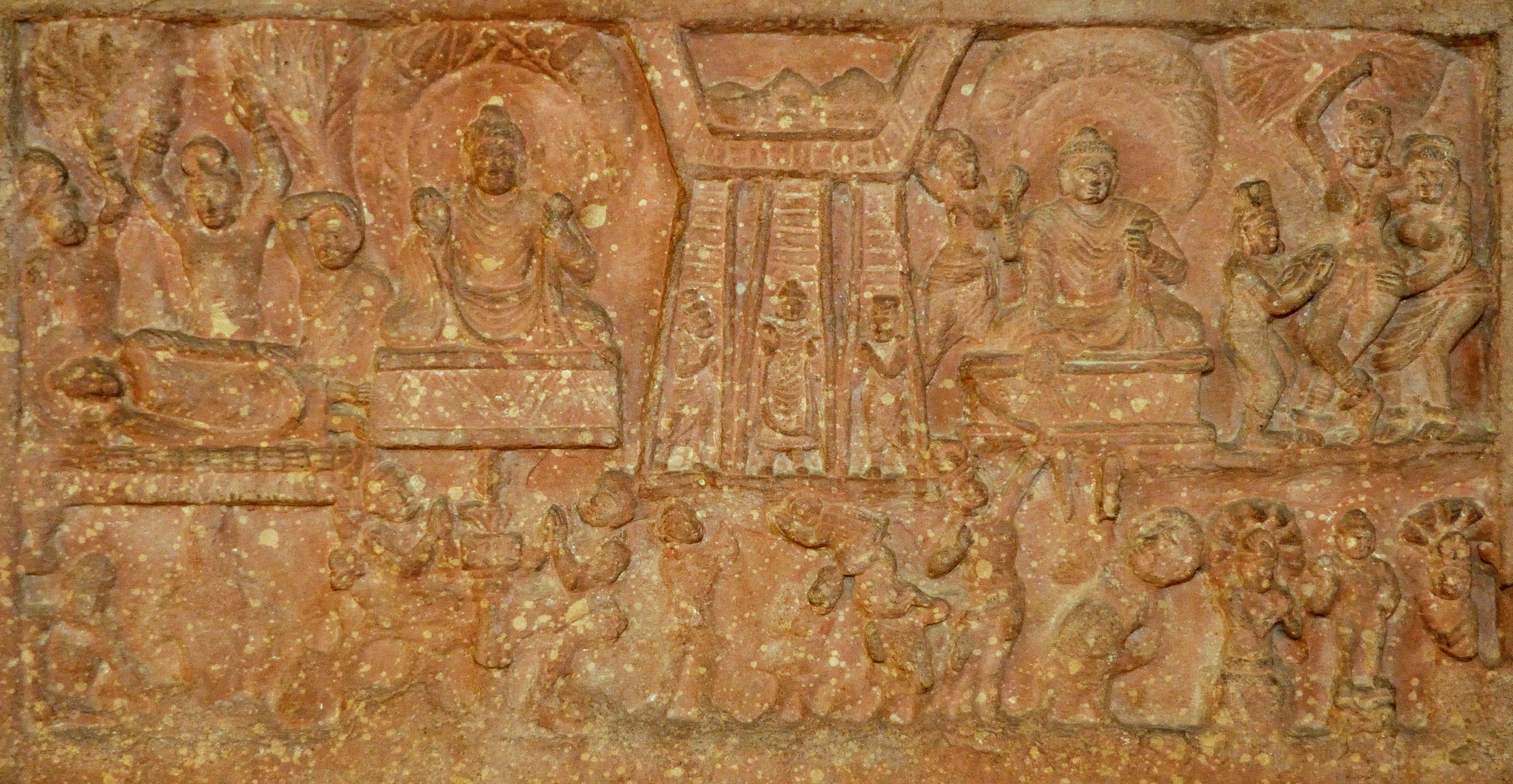
A Mathura relief showing the complete life of the Buddha, from birth to death. The clothing is Gandharan. 2nd Century CE

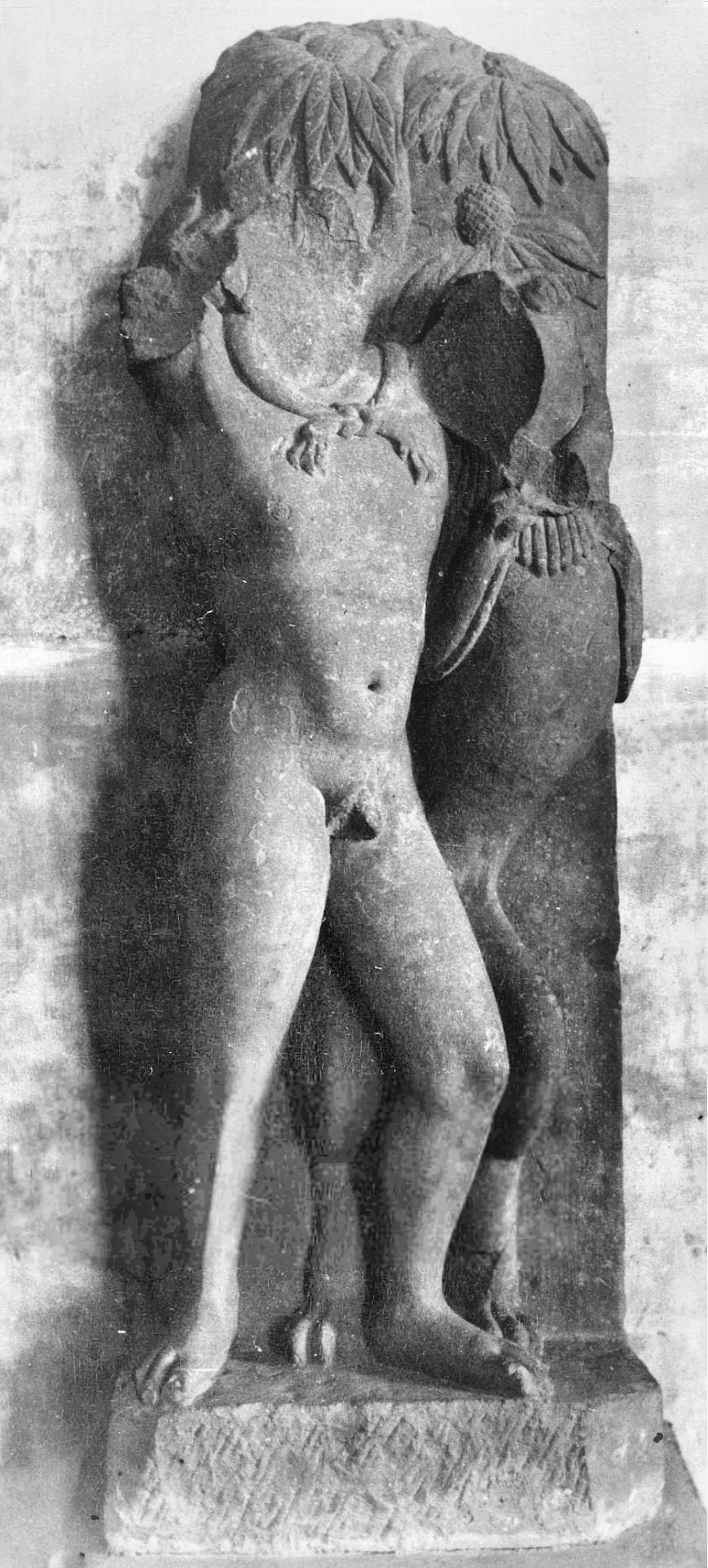
The Mathura Herakles. A statue of Herakles strangling the Nemean lion discovered in Mathura. For a recent photograph see . Early 2nd century CE.

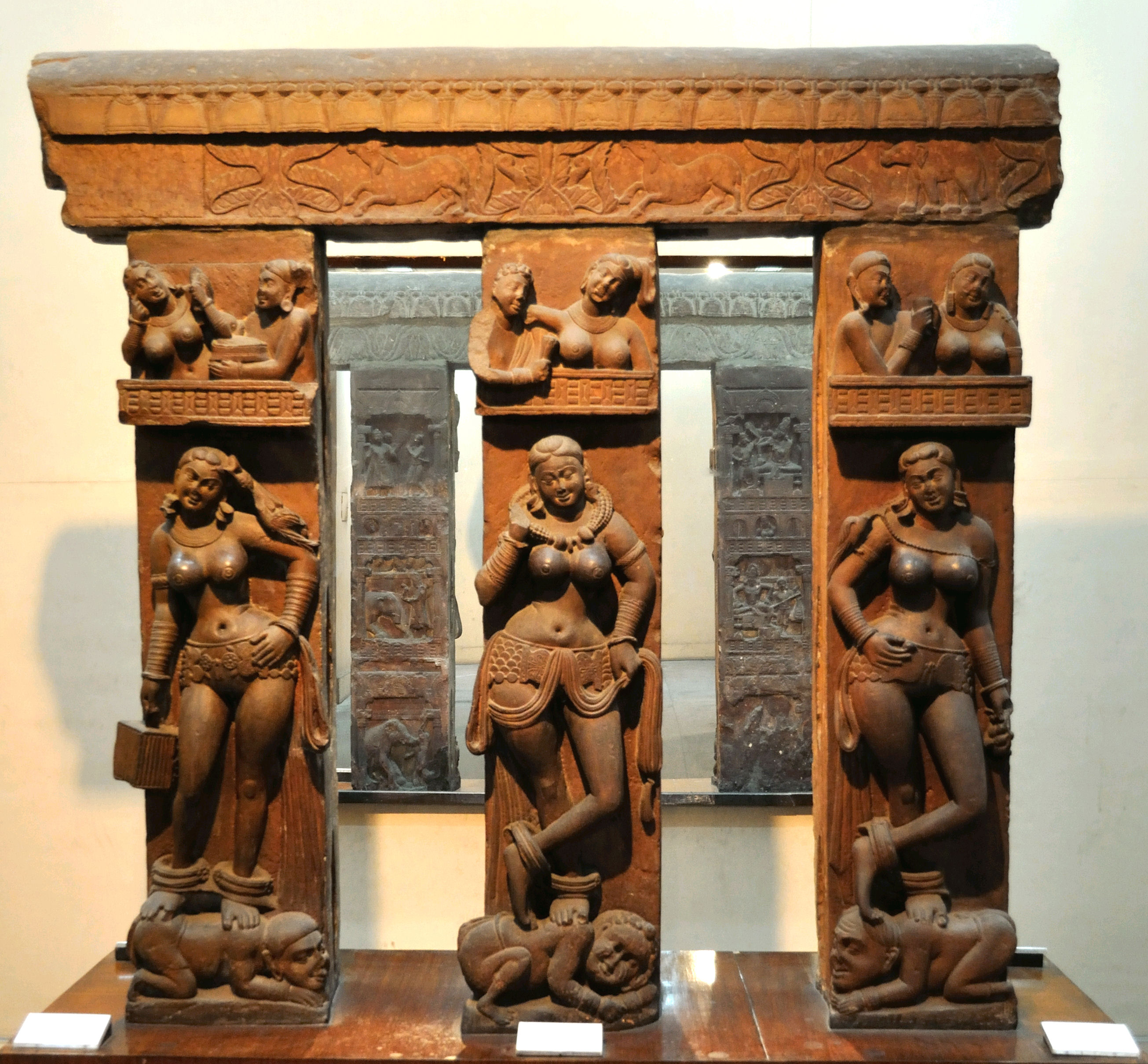
Bhutesvara Yakshis, Mathura ca. 2nd century CE. On the reverse are sculpted scenes of the life of the Buddha, wearing the monastic dress.

=== Hindu art at Mathura under the Kushans ===
Chatur-vyūha
"The four emanations"

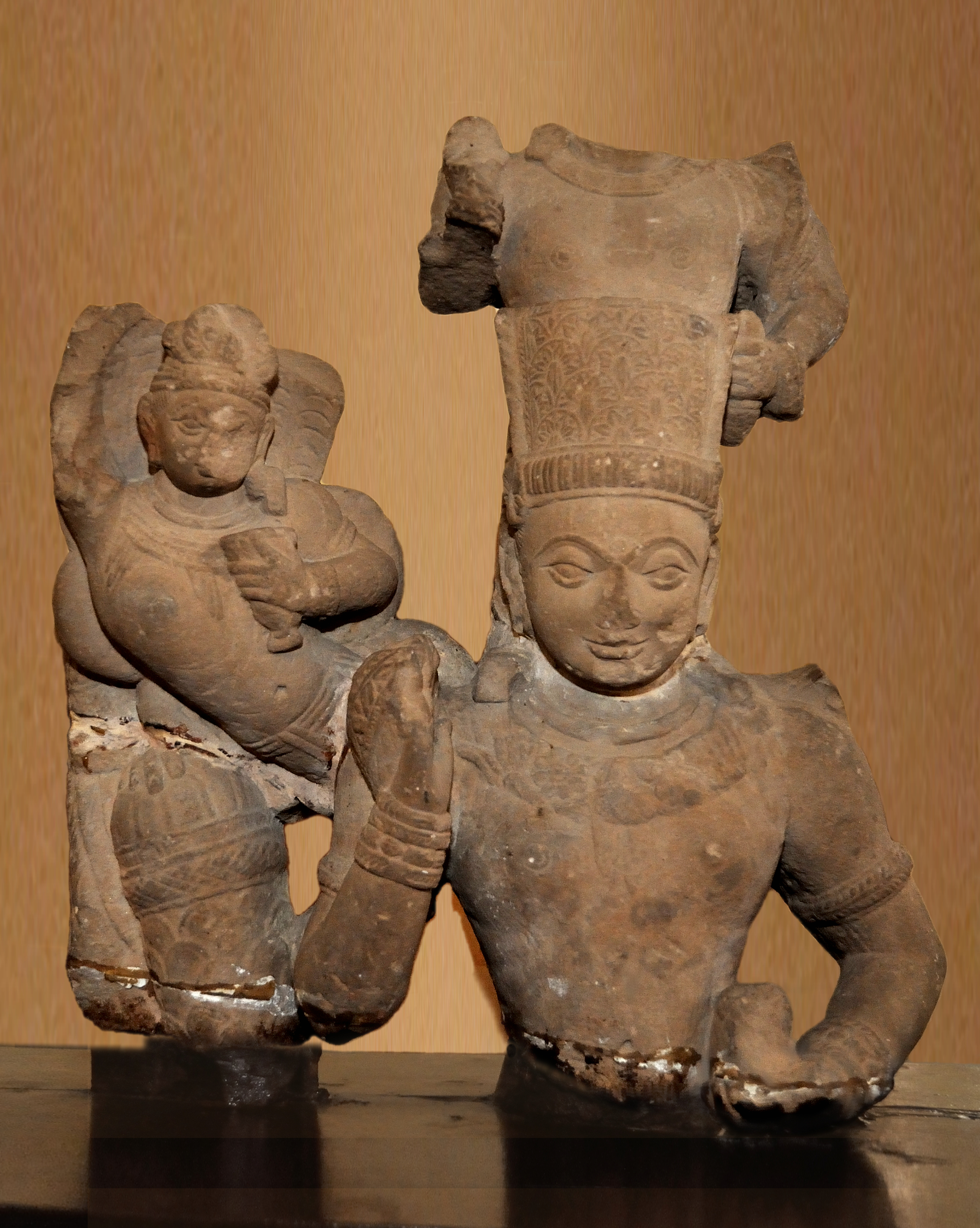
Front

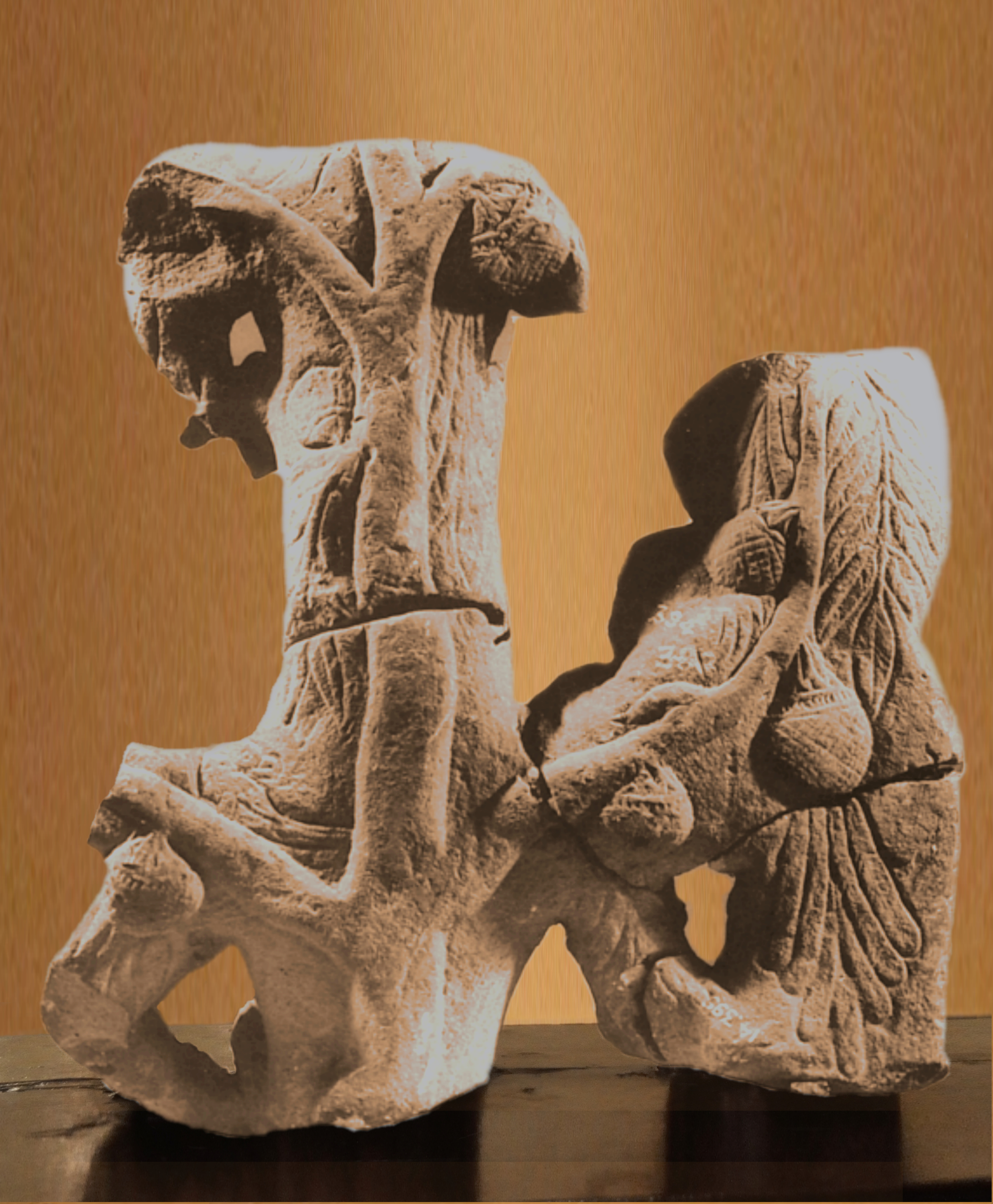
Back

The Chatur-vyūha: Vāsudeva and other members of the Vrishni clan. Vāsudeva is fittingly in the center with his heavy decorated mace on the side and holding a conch, his elder brother Balarama to his right under a serpent hood, his son Pradyumna to his left (lost), and his grandson Aniruddha on top. The back of the statue shows the trunk of a tree with branches, thus highlighting the genealogical relationship between the divinities. 2nd century CE, Mathura Museum.

Hindu art started to develop from the 1st to the 2nd century CE, and there are only very few examples of artistic representation before that time. Almost all of the first known instances of Hindu art have been discovered in the areas of Mathura and Gandhara. Still, Hindu images from the pre-Gupta period are very few at Mathura, and archaeological evidence suggest that Mathura remained mainly a center of Buddhist, rather than Vaishnava, activity even during the Gupta period itself.

Hindu art found its first inspiration in the Buddhist art of Mathura. The three Vedic gods Indra, Brahma and Surya were actually first depicted in Buddhist sculpture from the 2nd–1st century BCE, as attendants in scenes commemorating the life of the Buddha, even when the Buddha himself was not yet shown in human form but only through his symbols, such as the scenes of his Birth, his Descent from the Trāyastriṃśa Heaven, or his retreat in the Indrasala Cave. During the time of the Kushans, Hindu art progressively incorporated a profusion of original Hindu stylistic and symbolic elements, in contrast with the general balance and simplicity of Buddhist art. The differences appear in iconography rather than in style. It is generally considered that it is in Mathura, during the time of the Kushans, that the Brahmanical deities were given their standard form:

"To a great extent it is in the visual rendering of the various gods and goddesses of theistic Brahmanism that the Mathura artist displayed his ingenuity and inventiveness at their best. Along with almost all the major cult icons Visnu, Siva, Surya, Sakti and Ganapati, a number of subsidiary deities of the faith were given tangible form in Indian art here for the first time in an organized manner. In view of this and for the variety and multiplicity of devotional images then made, the history of Mathura during the first three centuries of the Christian era, which coincided with the rule of the Kusanas, can very well be called revolutionary in the development of Brahmanical sculpture"

— Pran Gopal Paul and Debjani Paul, in Brahmanical Imagery in the Kuṣāṇa Art of Mathurā: Tradition and Innovations

==== Cult images of Vāsudeva ====
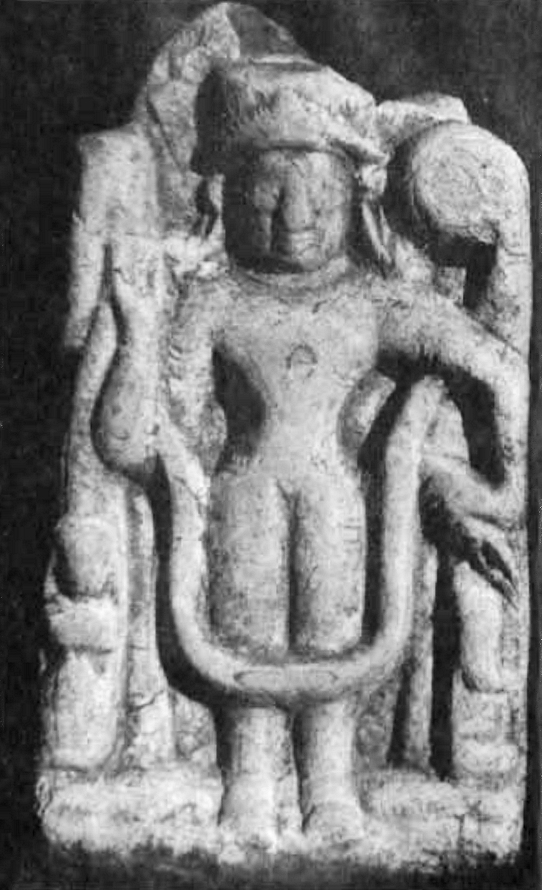
Type of statuette now reattributed to Vāsudeva, with three attributes (mace, wheel, conch), hand in abhaya mudra and without an aureole, 3rd–4th century.

Cult images of Vāsudeva continued to be produced during the period, the worship of this Mathuran deity being much more important than that of Vishnu until the 4th century CE. Statues dating to the 2nd and 3rd century show a possibly four-armed Vāsudeva standing with his attributes: the wheel, the mace and the conch, his right hand saluting in Abhaya mudra. Only with the Gupta period, did statues focusing on the worship of Vishnu himself start to appear, using the same iconography as the statues of Vāsudeva, but with the right hand holding a bijapuraka citrus instead of making the abhaya mudra gesture, and with the addition of an aureole starting at the shoulders.

A few triads are known from Mathura, dated to the 1st–2nd century CE, showing Vāsudeva and Saṃkarṣaṇa with their attributes, together with a female standing in the middle, thought to be Ekanamsha.

Some sculptures during this period suggest that the "Vyūha doctrine" (Vyūhavāda, "Doctrine of the emanations") was starting to emerge, as images of "Chatur-vyūha" (the "four emanations of Vāsudeva") are appearing. The famous "Caturvyūha" statue in Mathura Museum is an attempt to show in one composition Vāsudeva as the central deity together with the other members of the Vrishni clan of the Pancharatra system emanating from him: Samkarsana, Pradyumna and Aniruddha, with Samba missing. The back of the relief is carved with the branches of a Kadamba tree, symbolically showing the genealogical relationship being the different deities. The depiction of Vāsudeva and later Vishnu was stylistically derived from the type of the ornate Bodhisattvas, with rich jewelry and ornate headdress.

==== Absence of Gopala-Krishna life scenes ====
On the other hands, reliefs depicting the life story of Krishna, the Krishna-lilas scenes, are extremely rare or possibly inexistent during the Kushan period: only one such relief is known, showing the father Vasudeva carrying his son Krishna across the waters of the Yamuna, but even its interpretation is contested, and the date may be attributable to the post-Gupta period. During this time, statues pertaining to Gopala-Krishna, the other main component of the amalgamated Krishna, are absent from Mathura, suggesting the near absence of this cult in northern India down to the end of the Gupta period (6th century CE). The first major depictions of the legendary life of Gopala-Krishna appear in the sculptures of Badami in southern India from the 6th-7th century CE.

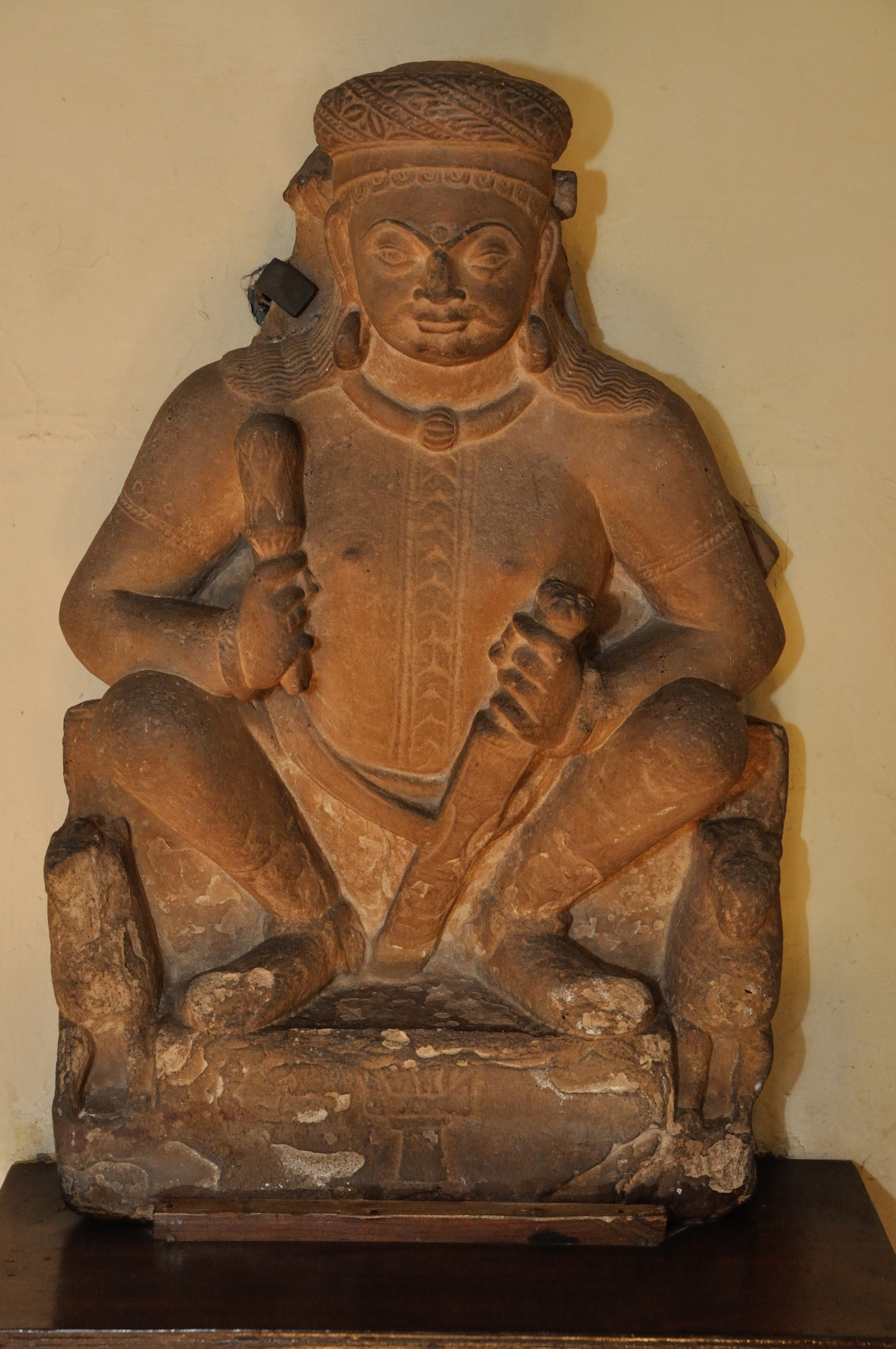
Sun God Surya in Indo-Scythian dress, also revered in Buddhism, 2nd century CE, Kankali Tila.

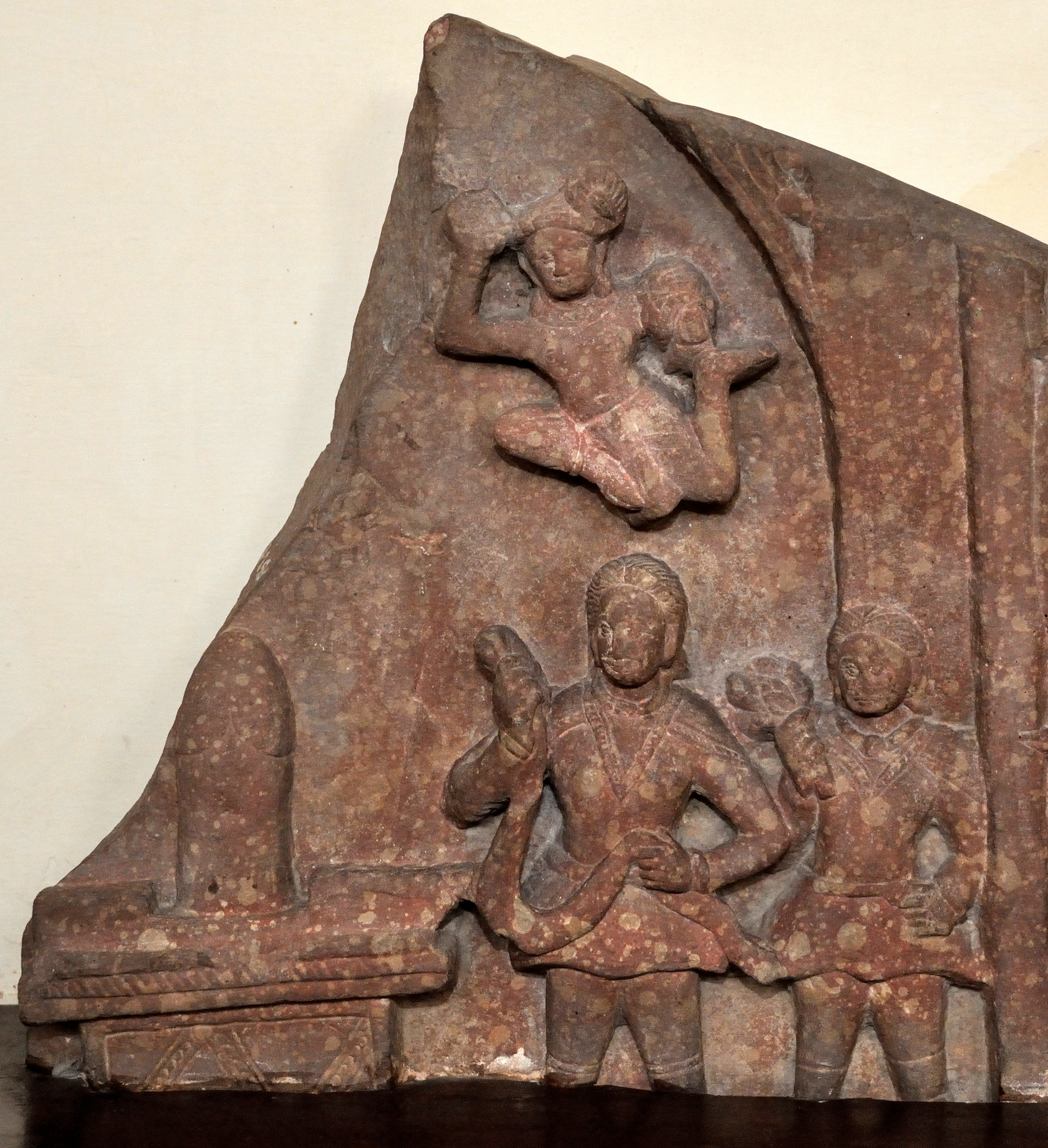
Shiva Linga worshipped by Indo-Scythian, or Kushan devotees, 2nd century CE.

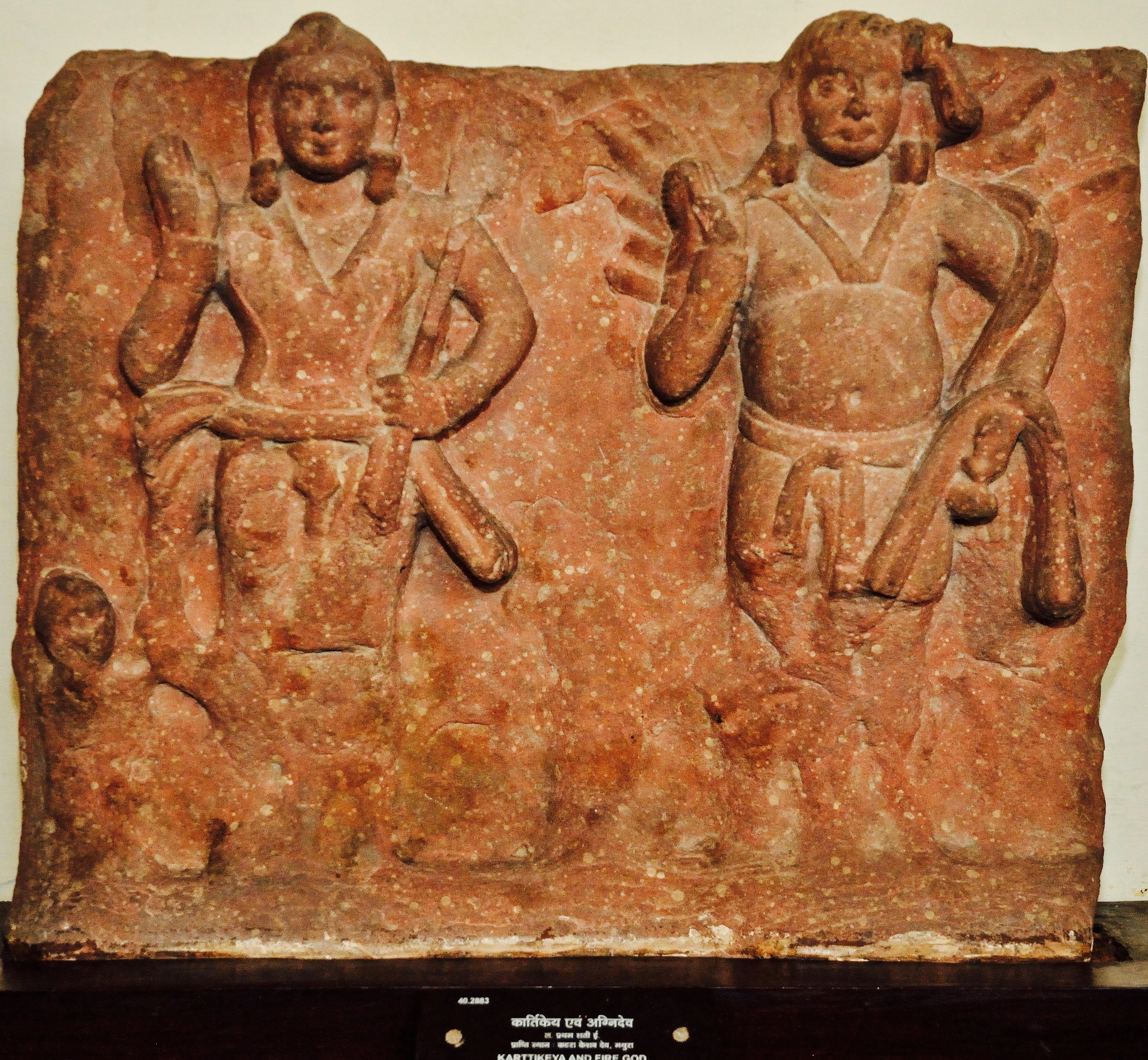
War God Karttikeya and Fire God Agni, Kushan Period, 1st century CE

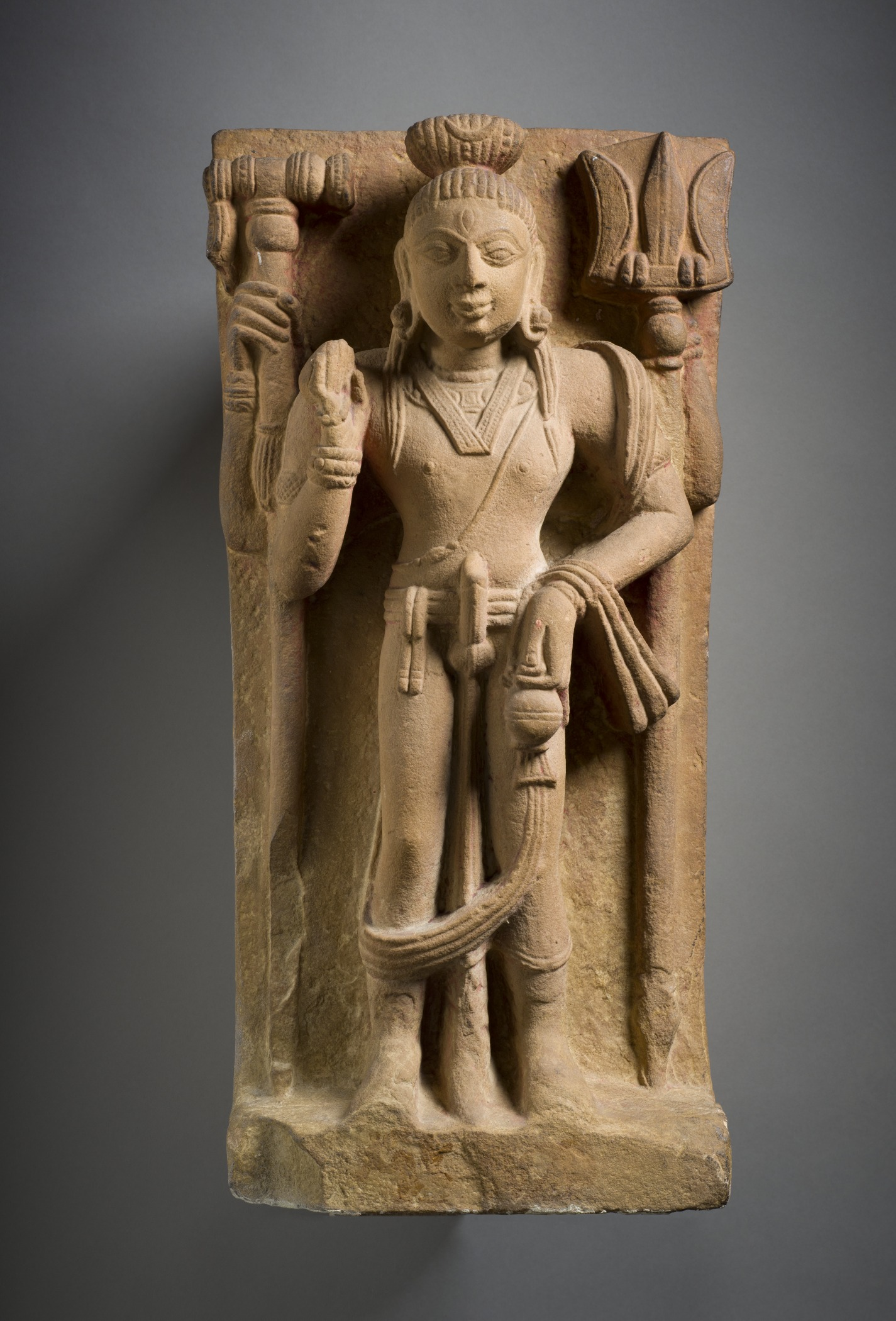
The Hindu God Shiva, 3rd century CE. Mathura or Ahichchhatra.

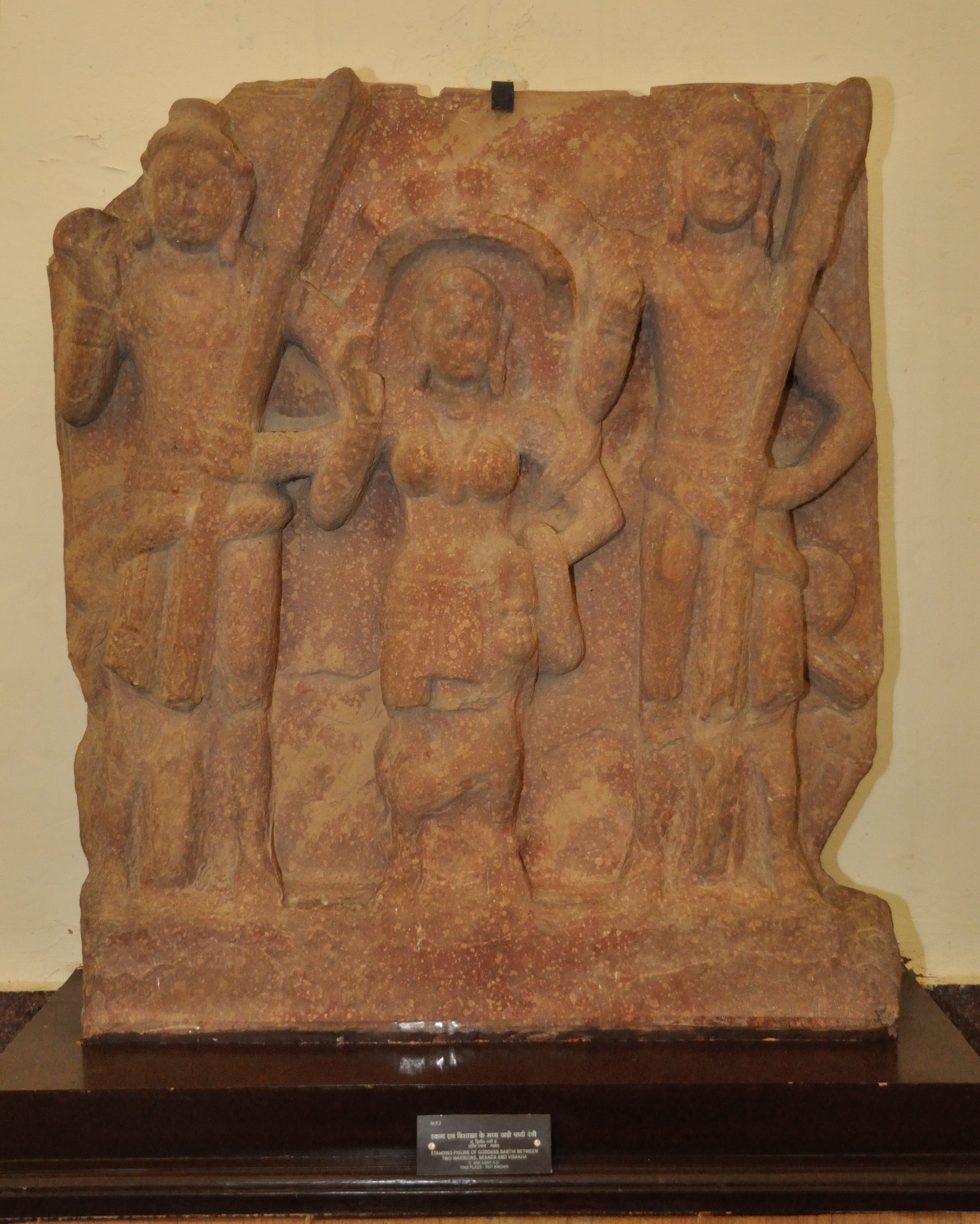
Kushan-era image of Shashthi between Skanda and Vishakha, c. 2nd century CE

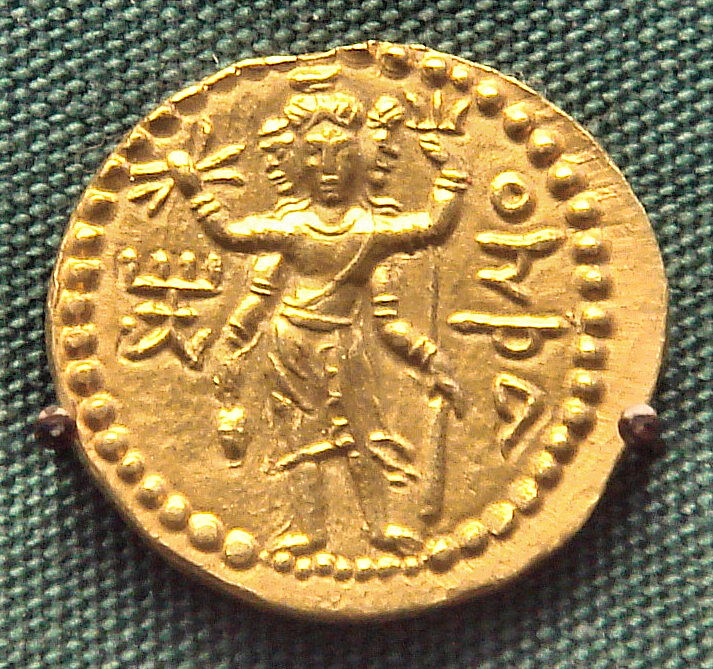
Three-faced four-armed Oesho with attributes, often identified with Shiva, on a coin of Huvishka.

=== Jain art at Mathura under the Kushans ===
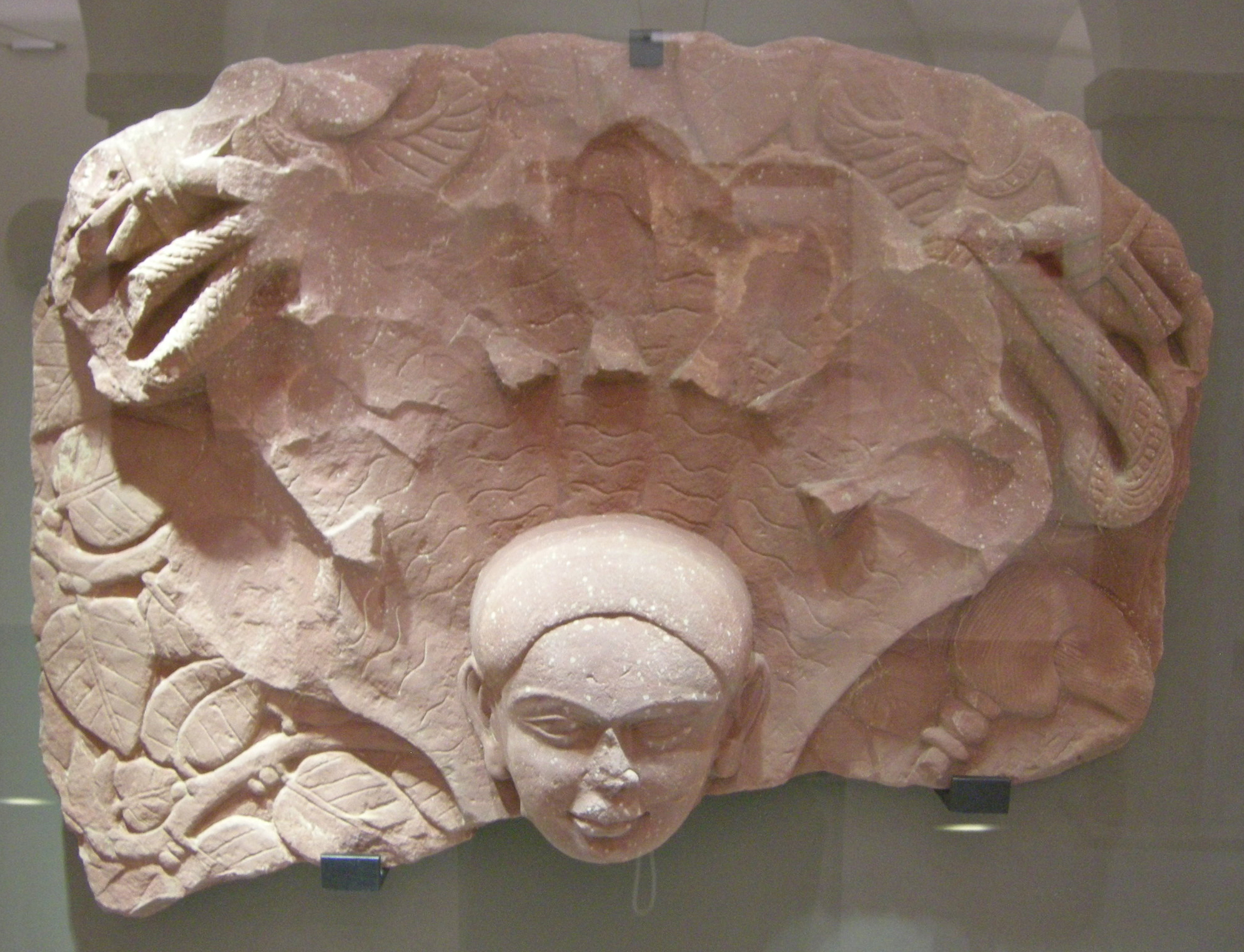
Parshvanatha, Kushan Period

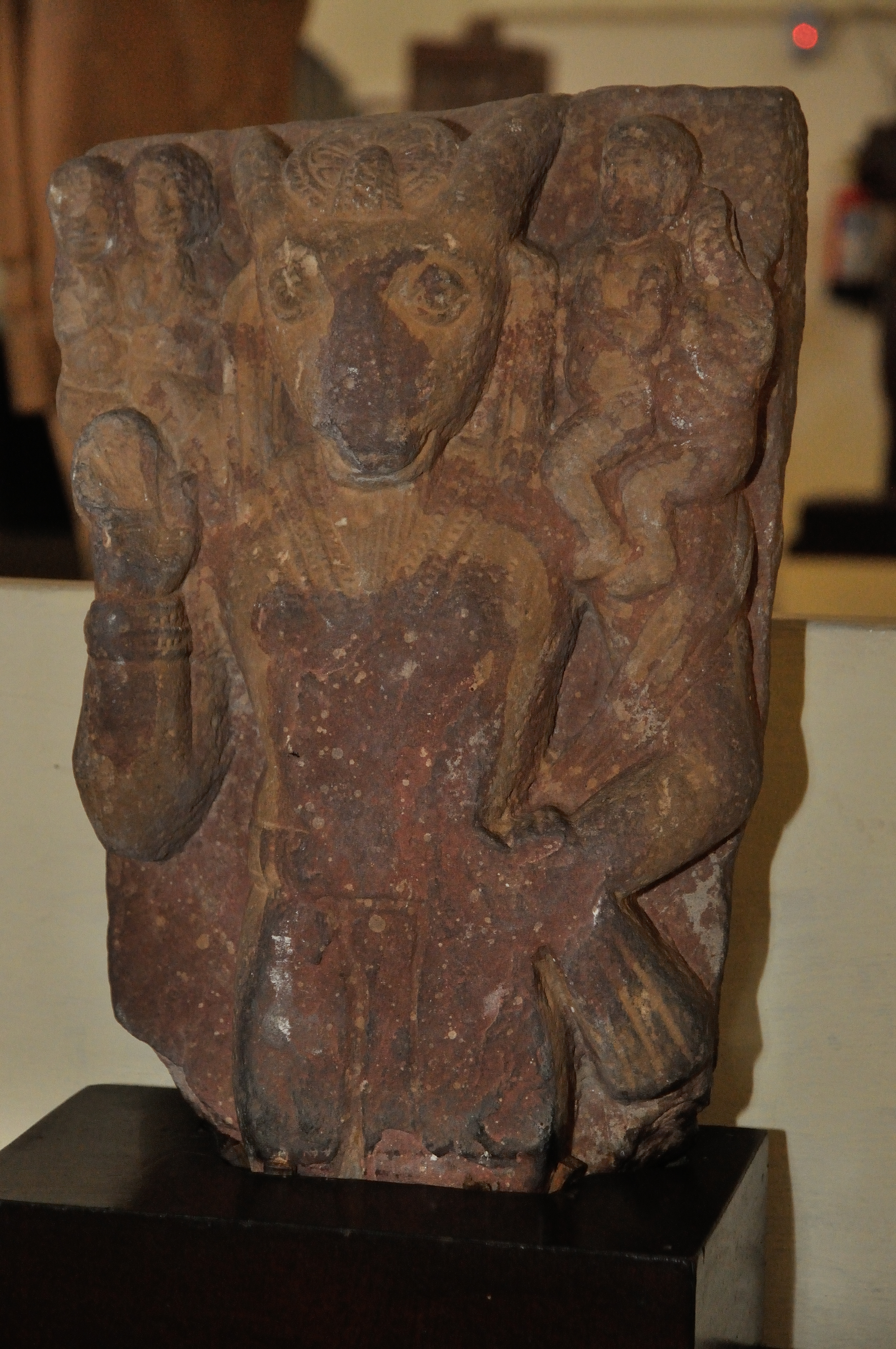
Goat-faced God Harinaigamesha, Kushan Period, Mathura

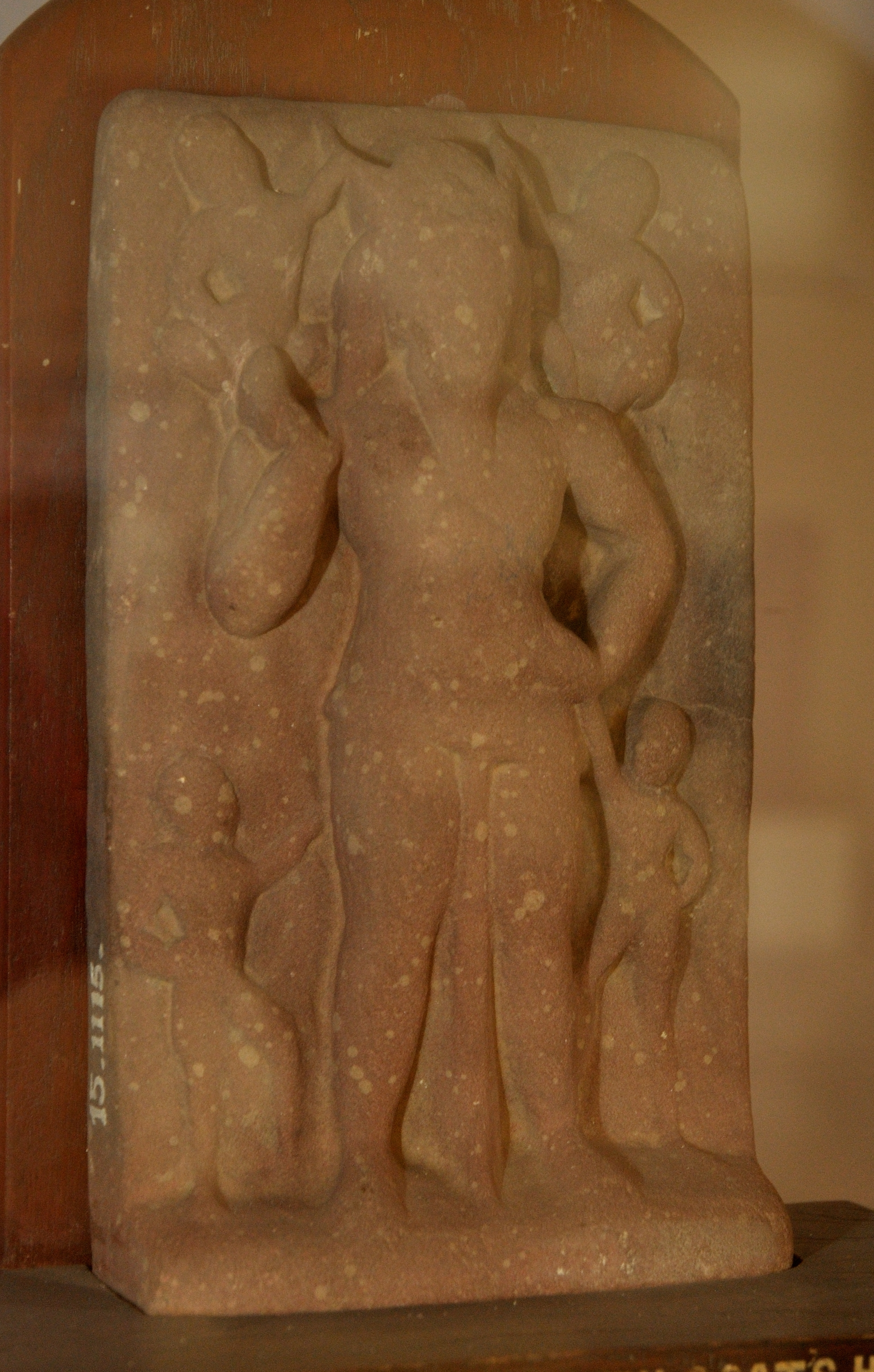
Jain god of Childbirth Naigamesha, 1st-3rd century CE.

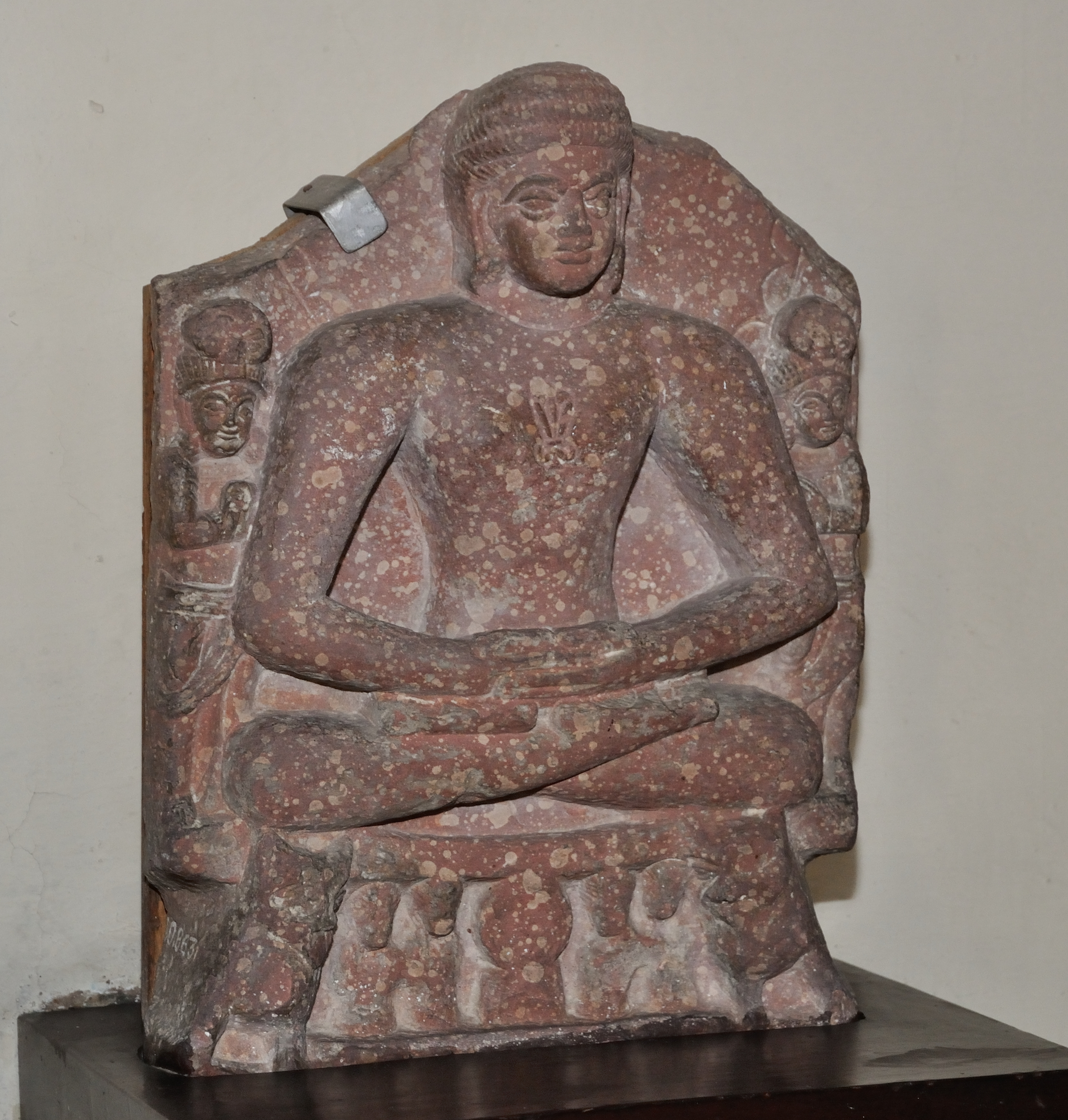
Jina in Meditation, Kushan Period, Mathura

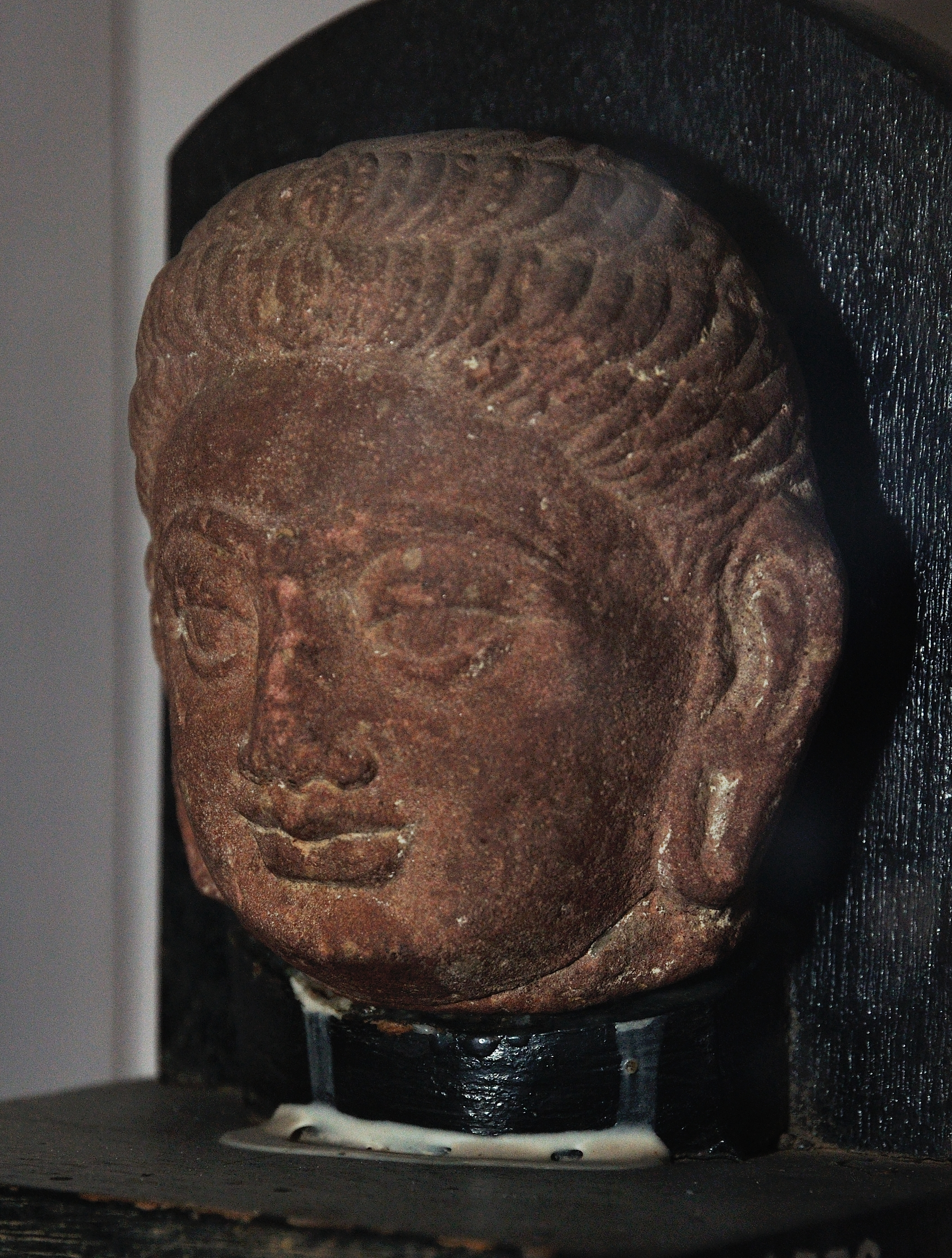
Tirthankara Head, Kushan Period, Mathura

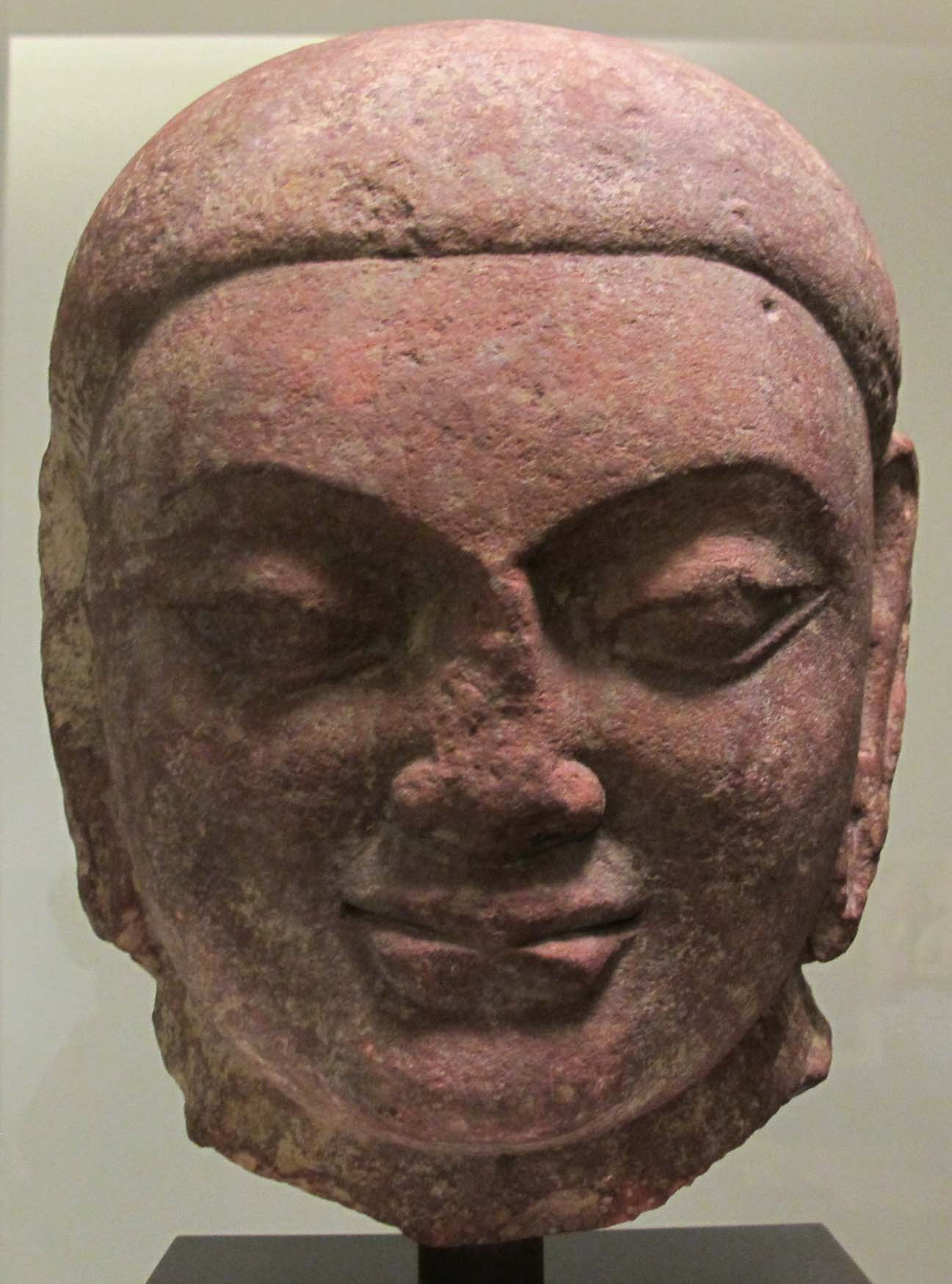
Tirthankara Head, Kushan Period, Mathura

== Gupta Empire period (4–6th century) ==
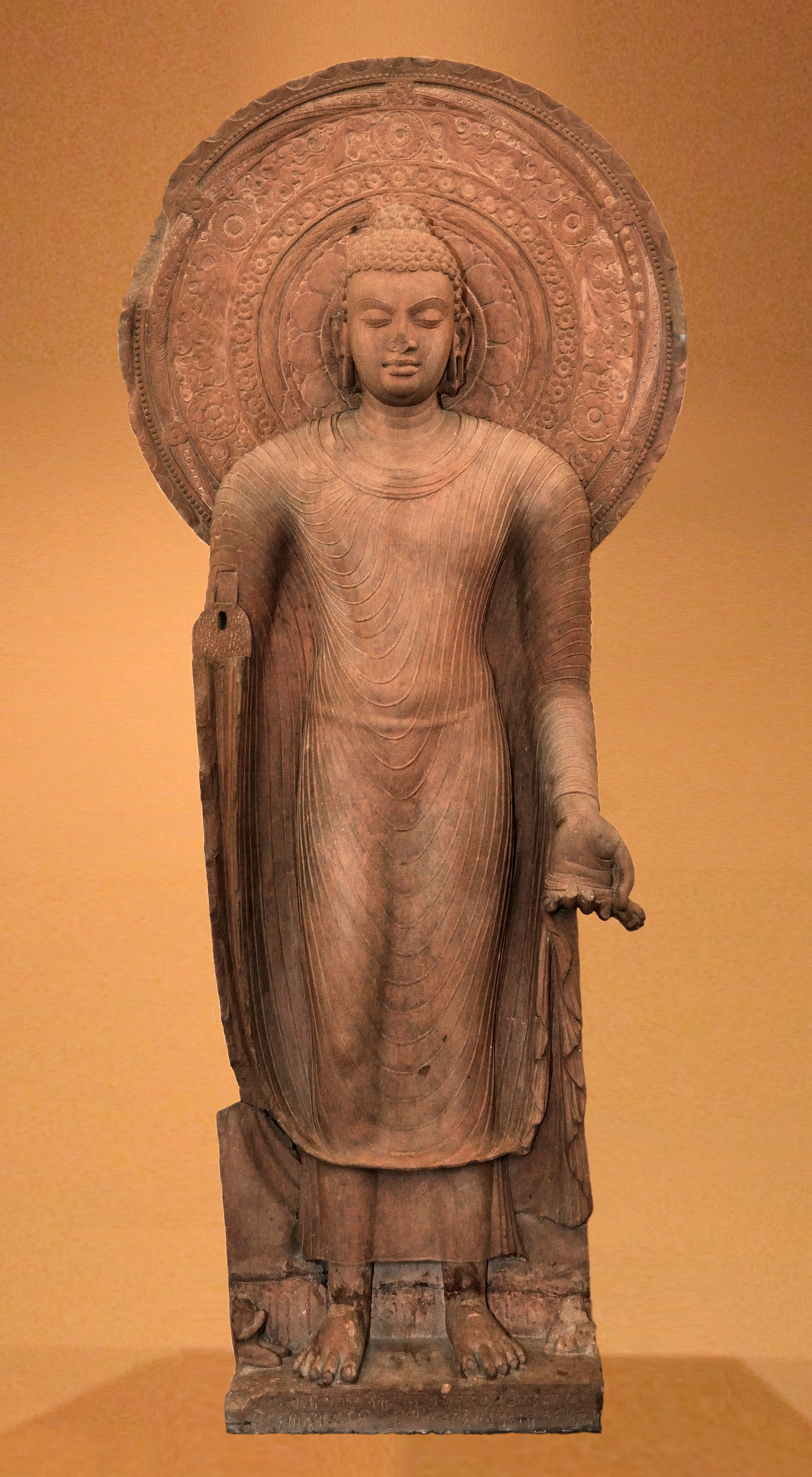
Standing Buddha in red sandstone, Mathura, Gupta Empire period, circa 5th century CE. Mathura Museum.

Following the decline of the Kushan Empire and the occupation of northern India by the Gupta Empire under Samudragupta (r.c. 335/350-375 CE), the art of Mathura continued to prosper and evolve. The Mathura school became one of the two major schools of Gupta Empire art, together with the school of Benares, with Mathura school remaining the most important and the oldest. It is characterized by its usage of mottled red stone from Karri in the Mathura district, and its foreign influences, continuing the traditions of the art of Gandhara and the art of the Kushans in Mathura.

The art of Mathura continued to become more sophisticated during the Gupta Empire, between the 4th and 6th centuries CE. The pink sandstone sculptures of Mathura evolved during the Gupta period (4th to 6th century CE) to reach a very high fineness of execution and delicacy in the modeling, displaying calm and serenity. The style becomes elegant and refined, with a very delicate rendering of the draping and a sort of radiance reinforced by the usage of pink sandstone. Artistic details tend to be less realistic, as seen in the symbolic shell-like curls used to render the hairstyle of the Buddha, and the ornate halos around the head of the Buddhas. The art of the Gupta is often considered as the pinnacle of Indian Buddhist art, achieving a beautiful rendering of the Buddhist ideal.

Gupta art is also characterized by an expansion of the Buddhist pantheon, with a high importance given to the Buddha himself and to new deities, including Bodhisattvas such as Avalokitesvara or divinities of Bramanical inspiration, and less focus on the events of the life of the Buddha which were abundantly illustrated through Jataka stories in the art of Bharhut and Sanchi (2nd–1st centuries BCE), or in the Greco-Buddhist art of Gandhara (1st–4th centuries CE).

The Gupta art of Mathura was very influential throughout northern India, accompanied by a reducing of foreign influences. It was also extremely influential in the development of Buddhist art almost everywhere in the rest of Asia.

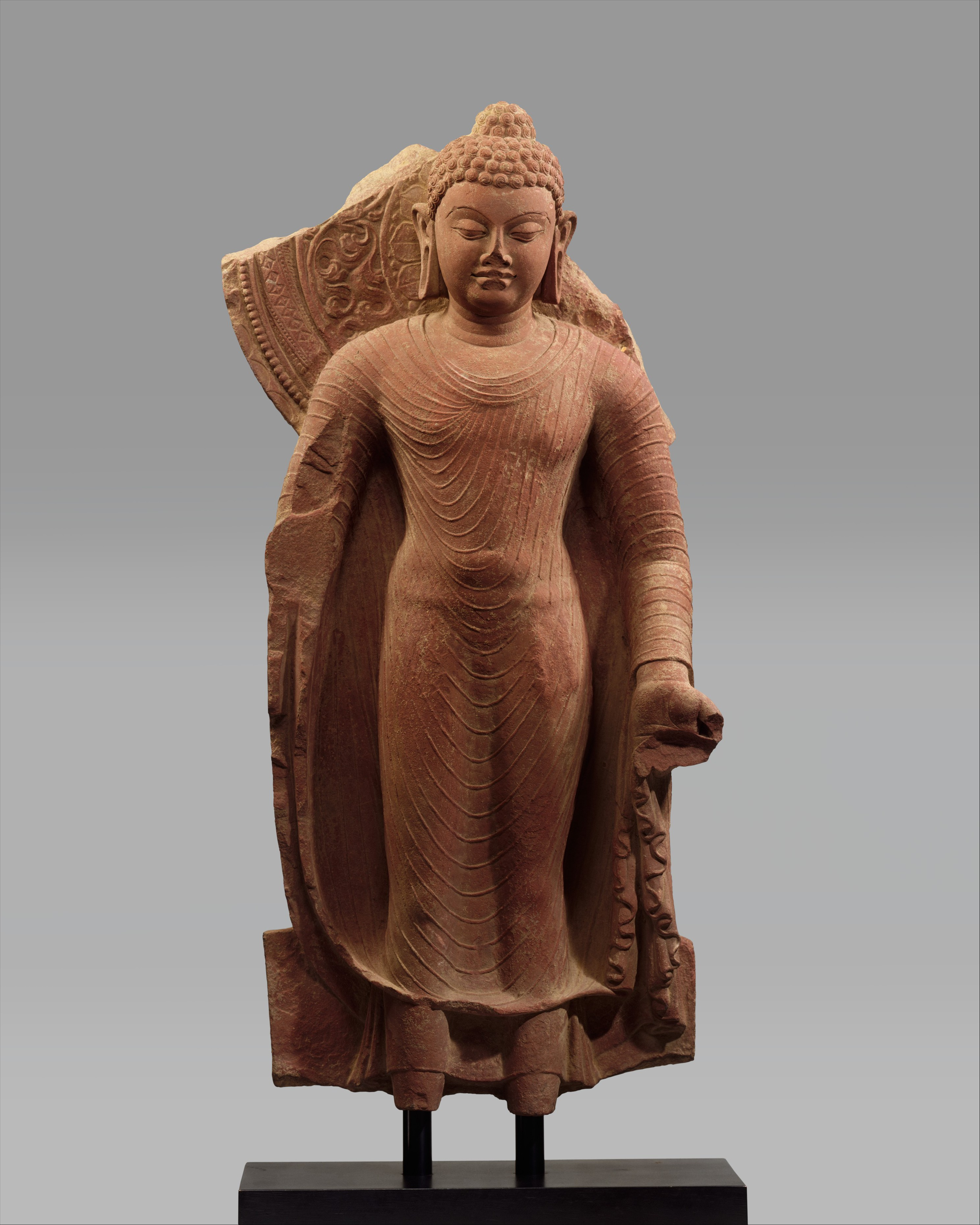
Standing Buddha, late 5th century

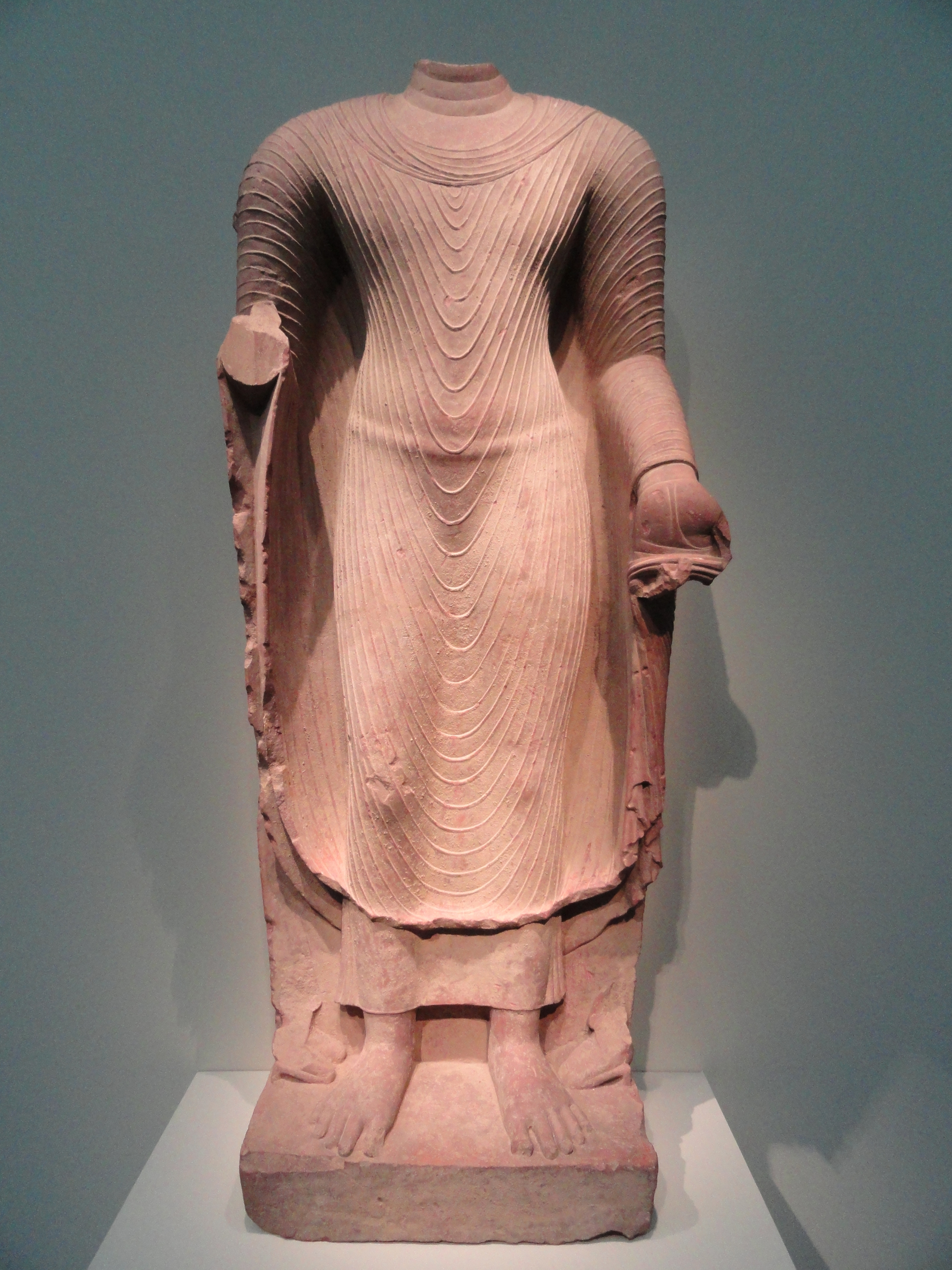
Standing Buddha, Gupta dynasty, 320–485, Mathura

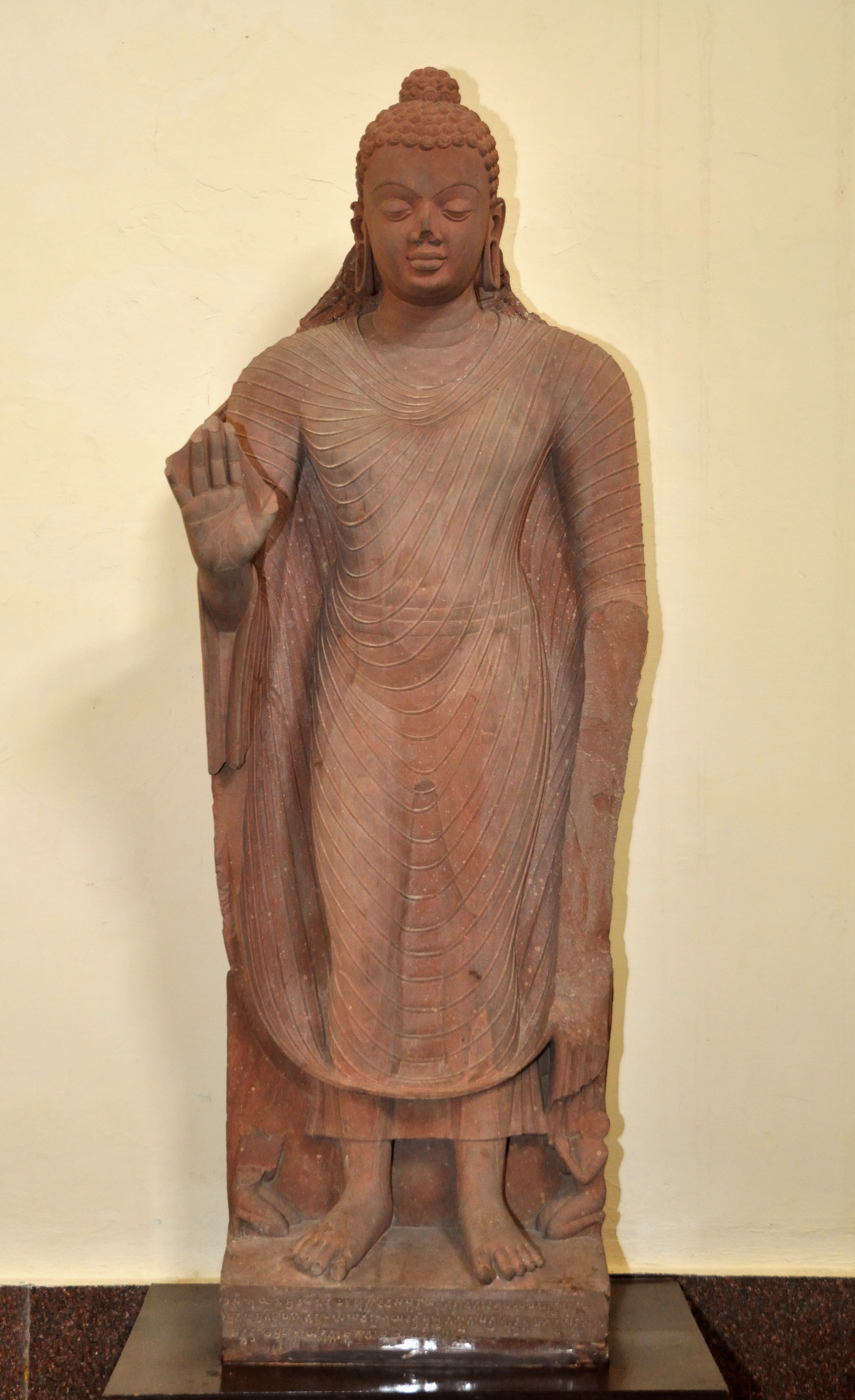
Standing Buddha, inscribed Gupta Era year 115 (434 CE), Mathura.

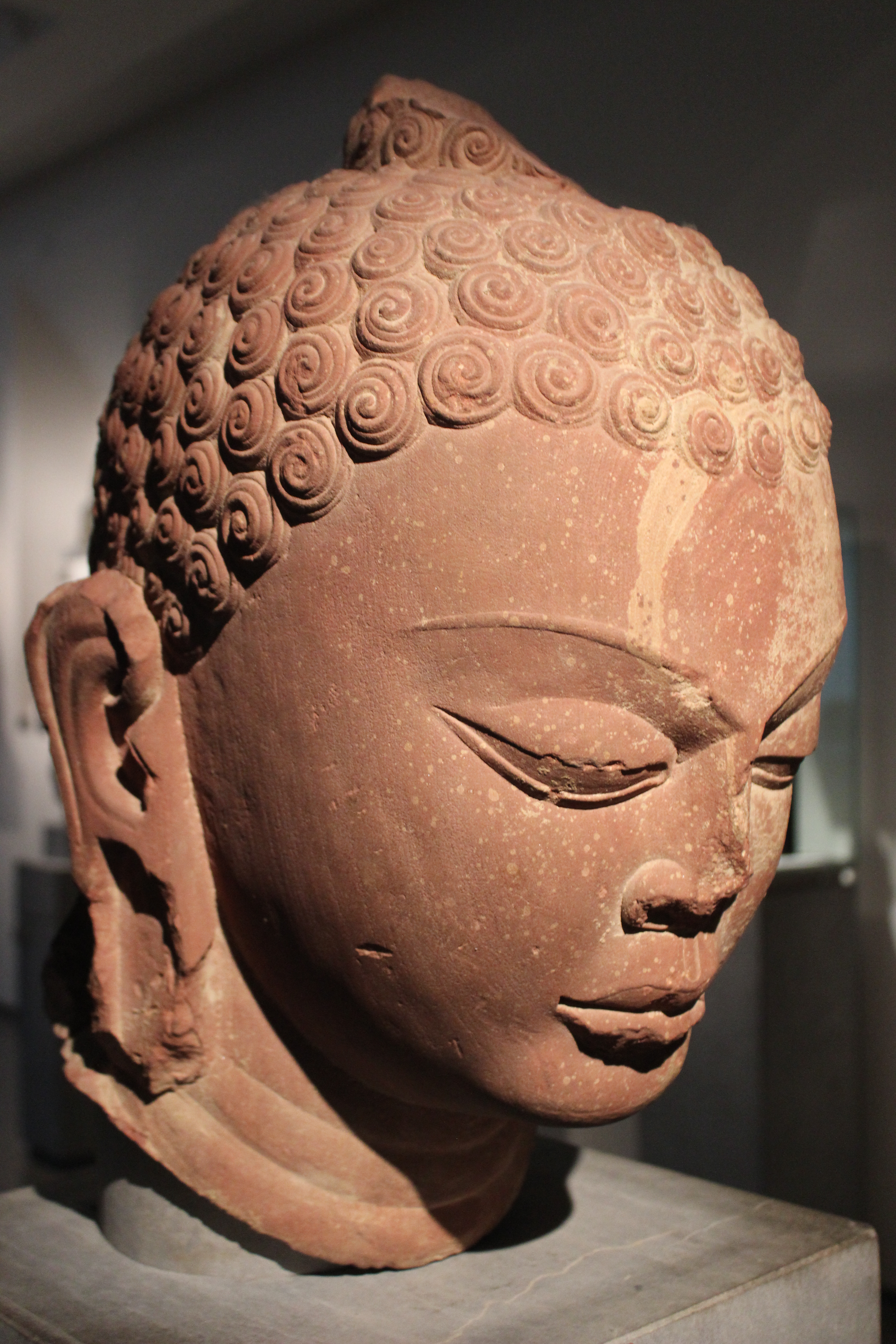
Head of a Buddha, 6th century.

=== Hindu art at Mathura under the Guptas ===
Iconography of Vishnu
(5th century CE)

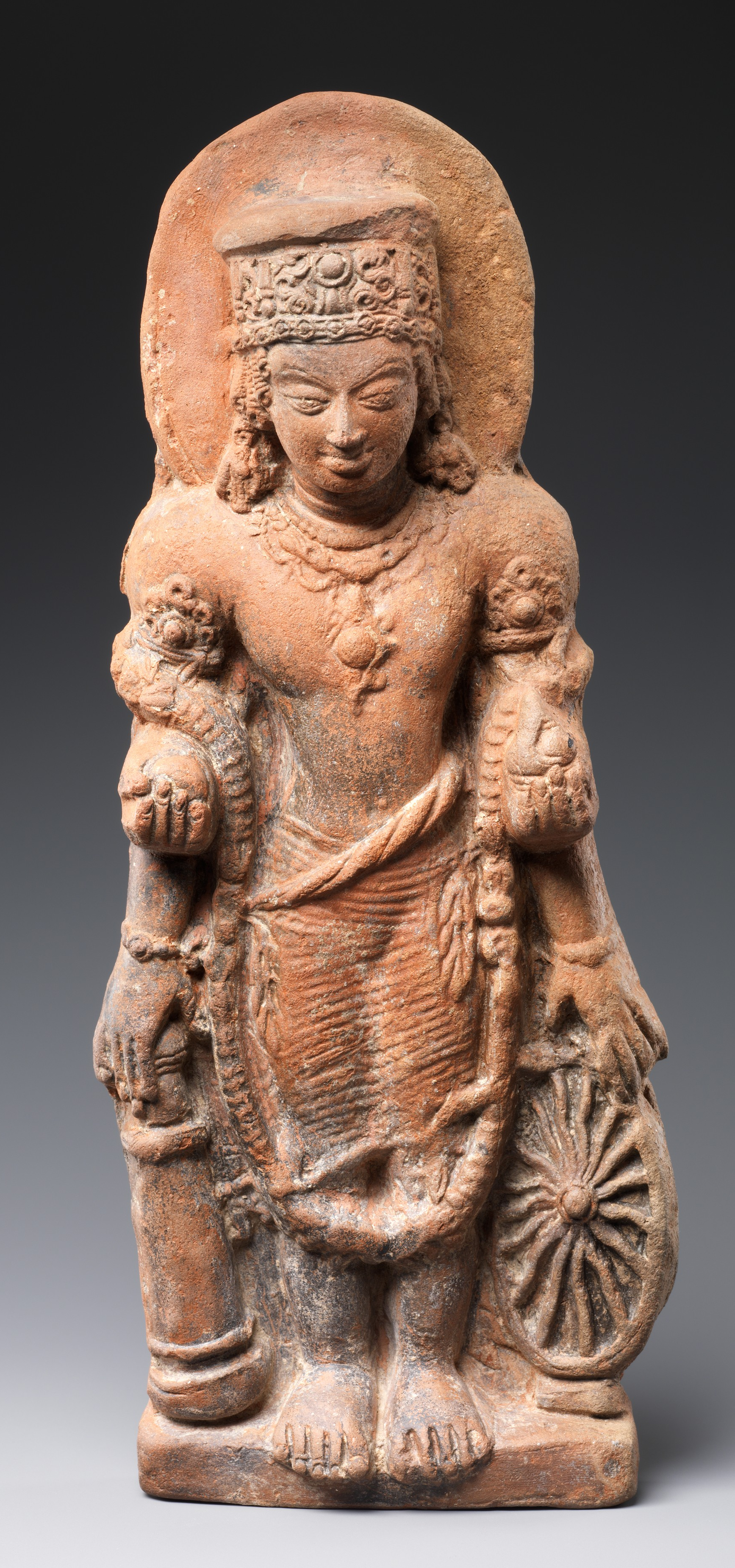
Four-armed Vishnu with the attributes of Vāsudeva-Krishna, and a supplementary aureole. 5th century CE, Uttar Pradesh.

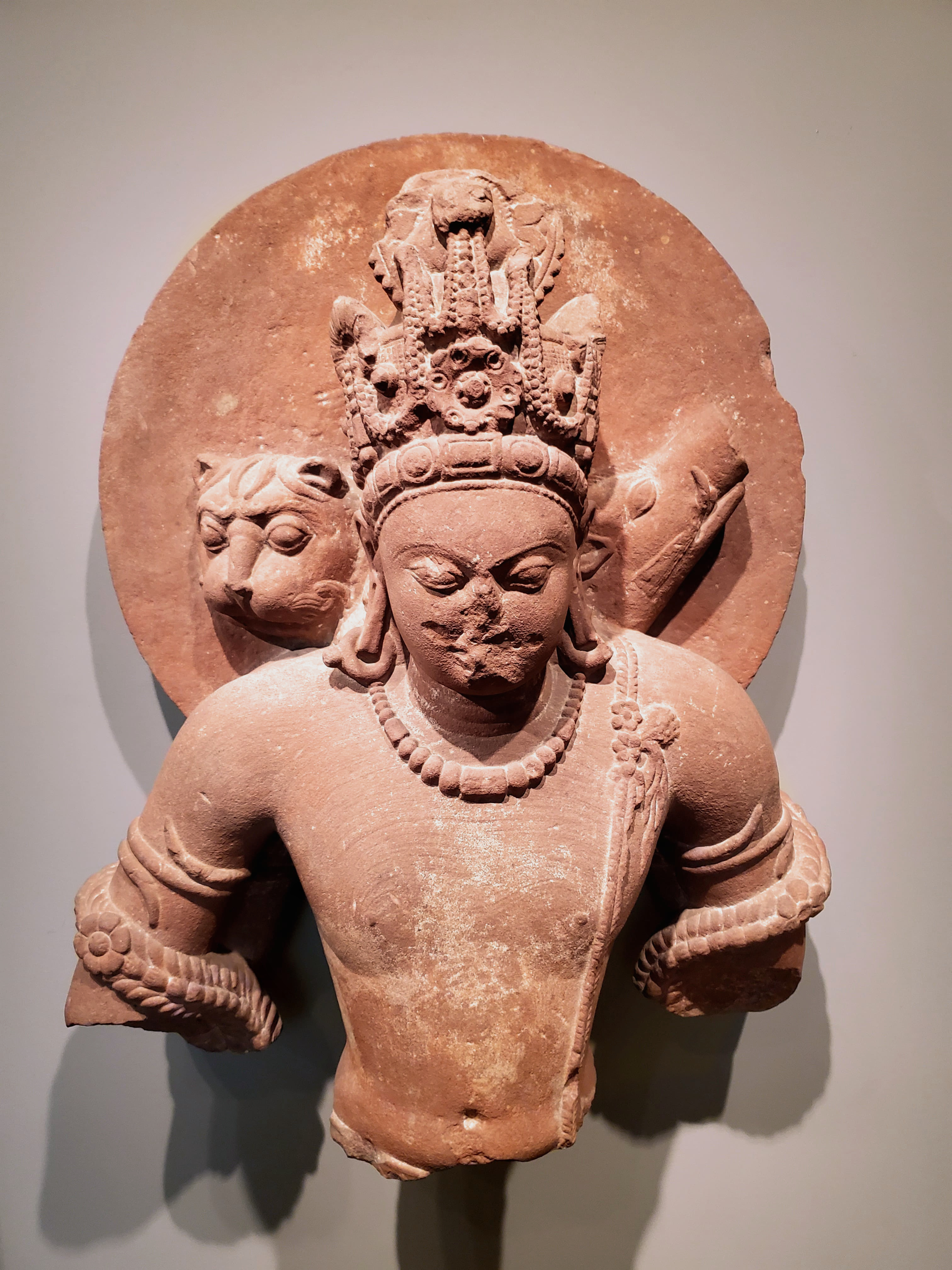
Vishnu and his avatars (Vaikuntha Chaturmurti): Vishnu himself or Vasudeva-Krishna in human form, Narasimha as a lion, Varaha as a boar. Mathura, mid-5th century CE. Boston Museum.

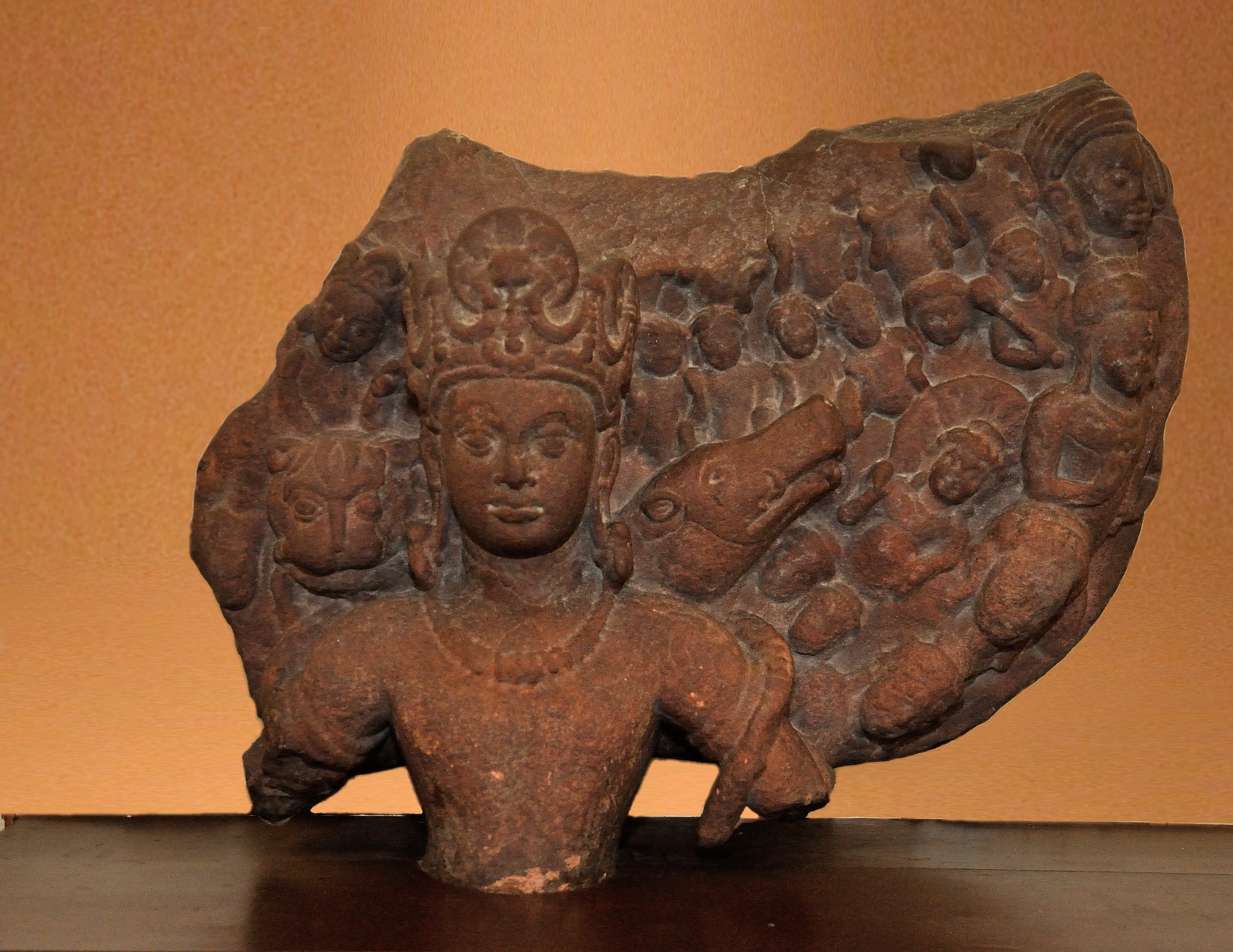
Visnu Visvarupa: Vishnu as three-headed cosmic creator, showing Vishnu with a human head, flanked by his avatars (the head of a lion for Narasimha, the muzzle of a boar for Varaha) with a multitude of beings on his aureole, symbol of the emanations resulting from his creative power. 5th century CE, Bhankari, Mathura.

Under the Guptas, Mathura remained primarily a center of Buddhist artistic activity and worship, but a few Hindu sculptures started to appear. The first known creation of the Guptas relating to Hindu art at Mathura is an inscribed pillar recording the installation of two Shiva Lingas in 380 CE under Chandragupta II, Samudragupta's successor.

==== Development of the iconography of Vishnu ====
Until the 4th century CE, the worship of Vāsudeva-Krishna seems to have been much more important than that of Vishnu. With the Gupta period, statues focusing on the worship of Vishnu start to appear, in the form of an evolution based on the earlier statues of Vāsudeva-Krishna. Many of the statues of Vishnu appearing from the 4th century CE, such as the Vishnu Caturanana ("Four-Armed"), use the attributes and the iconography of Vāsudeva-Krishna, but add an aureole starting at the shoulders.

Other statues of Vishnu show him as three-headed (possibly with an implied fourth head in the back), the Vaikuntha Chaturmurti type, where Vishnu or his human emanation Vāsudeva-Krishna is shown with a human head, flanked by the muzzle of a boar (his avatar Varaha) and the head of a lion (his avatar Narasimha), two of his most important and ancient avatars, laid out upon his aureole. A fourth avatar is sometimes shown in the back of the sculptures of Kashmir, showing the avatar Trivikrama, but never in the statuary of Mathura. Recent scholarship considers that these "Vishnu" statues still show the emanation Vāsudeva Krishna as the central human-shaped deity, rather than the Supreme God Vishnu himself.

A further variation is Vishnu as three-headed cosmic creator, the Visnu Visvarupa, showing Vishnu with a human head, again flanked by the muzzle of a boar the head of a lion, but with a multitude of beings on his aureole, symbol of the numerous creations and emanations resulting from his creative power. These sculptures can be dated to the 5th century CE.

==== Incorporation of Lakshmi ====
In the 3rd–4th century CE, Lakshmi, which had been an independent Goddess of prosperity and luck, was incorporated in the Vaishnava pantheon as the consort of Vishnu. She thus became the Hindu goddess of wealth, good fortune, prosperity and beauty.

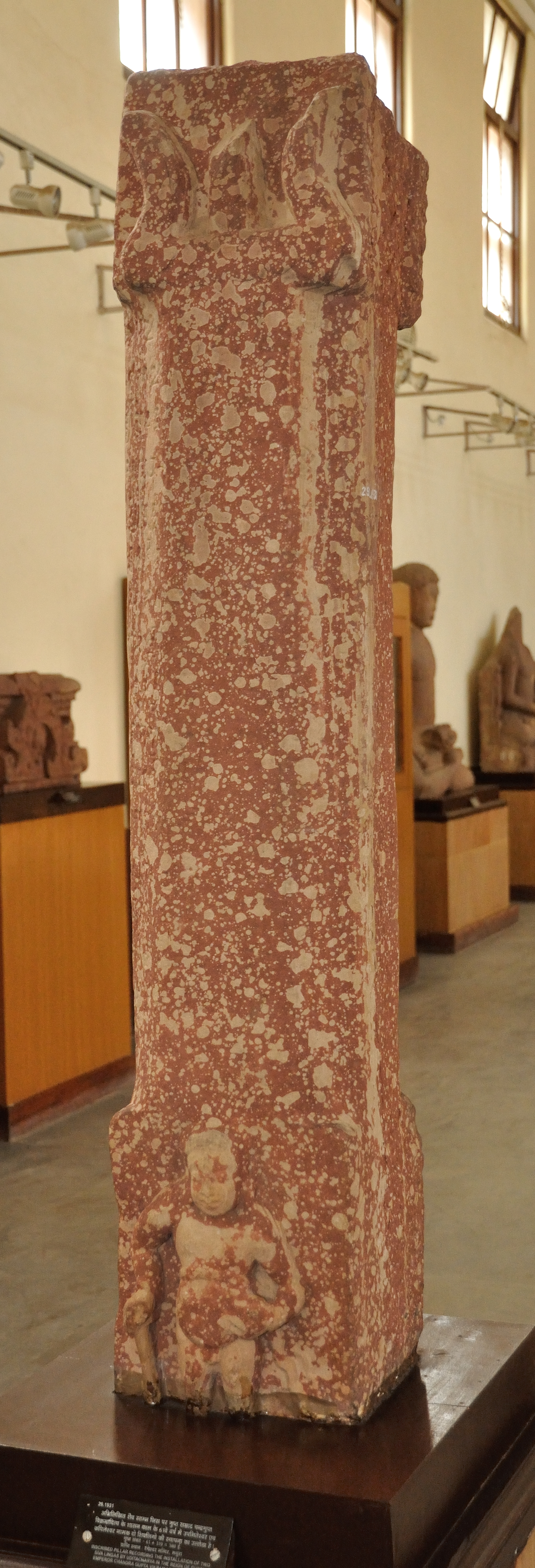
Pillar recording the installation of Shiva Lingas in the "year 61" (380 CE) during the rule of Chandragupta II.

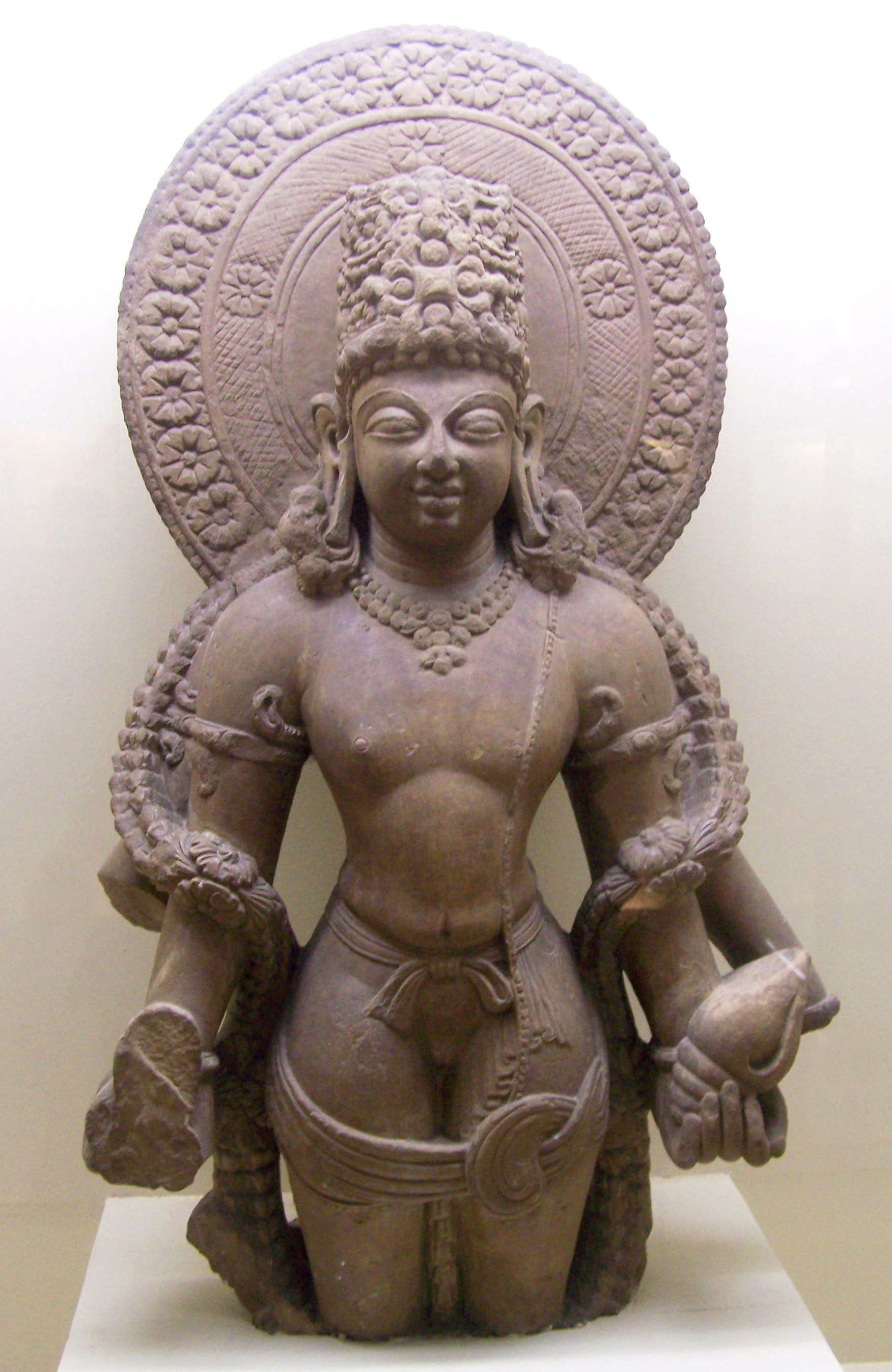
Vishnu Caturanana ("Four-Armed"), 5th century, Mathura

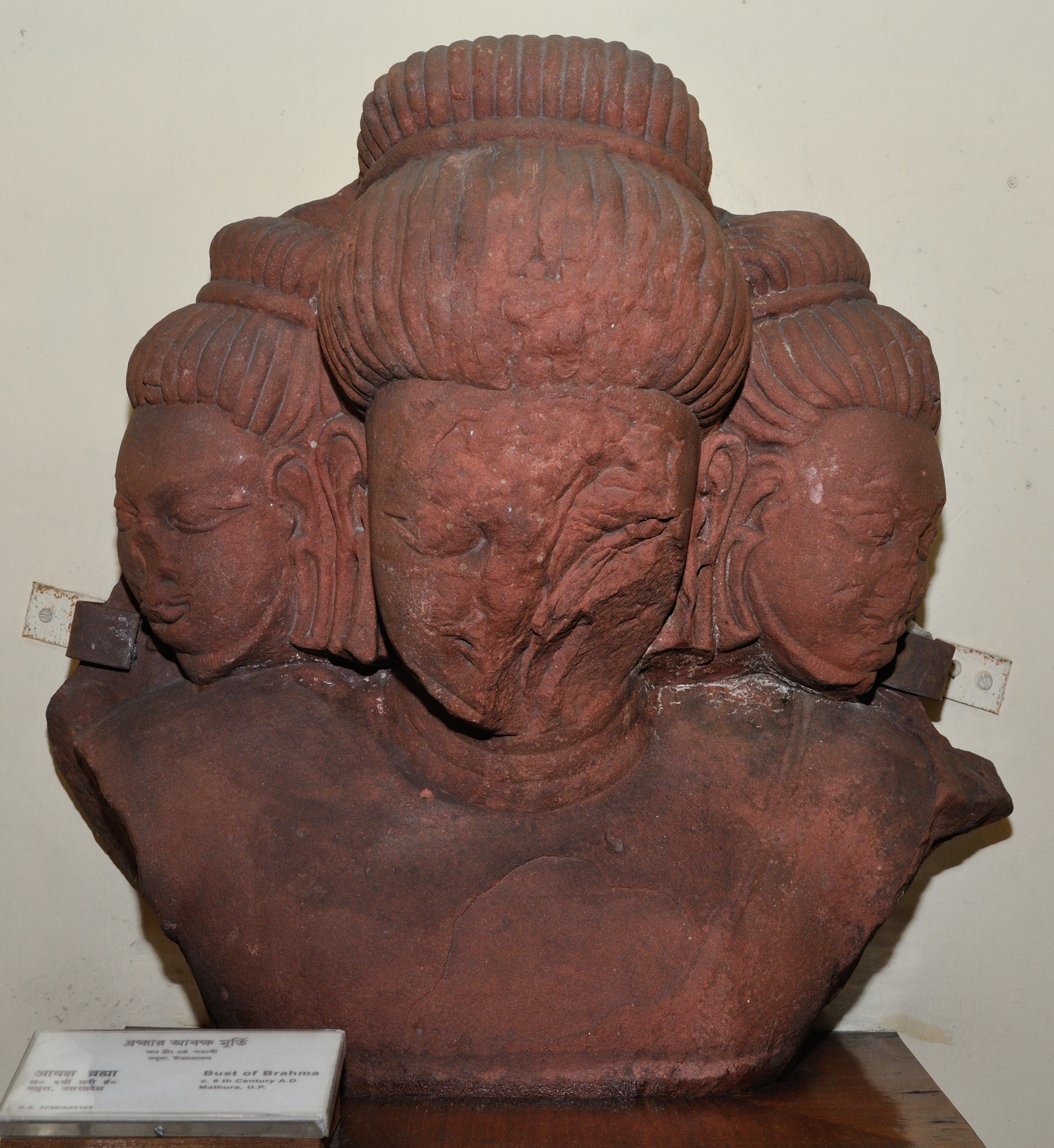
Bust of Brahma, Circa 6th Century CE

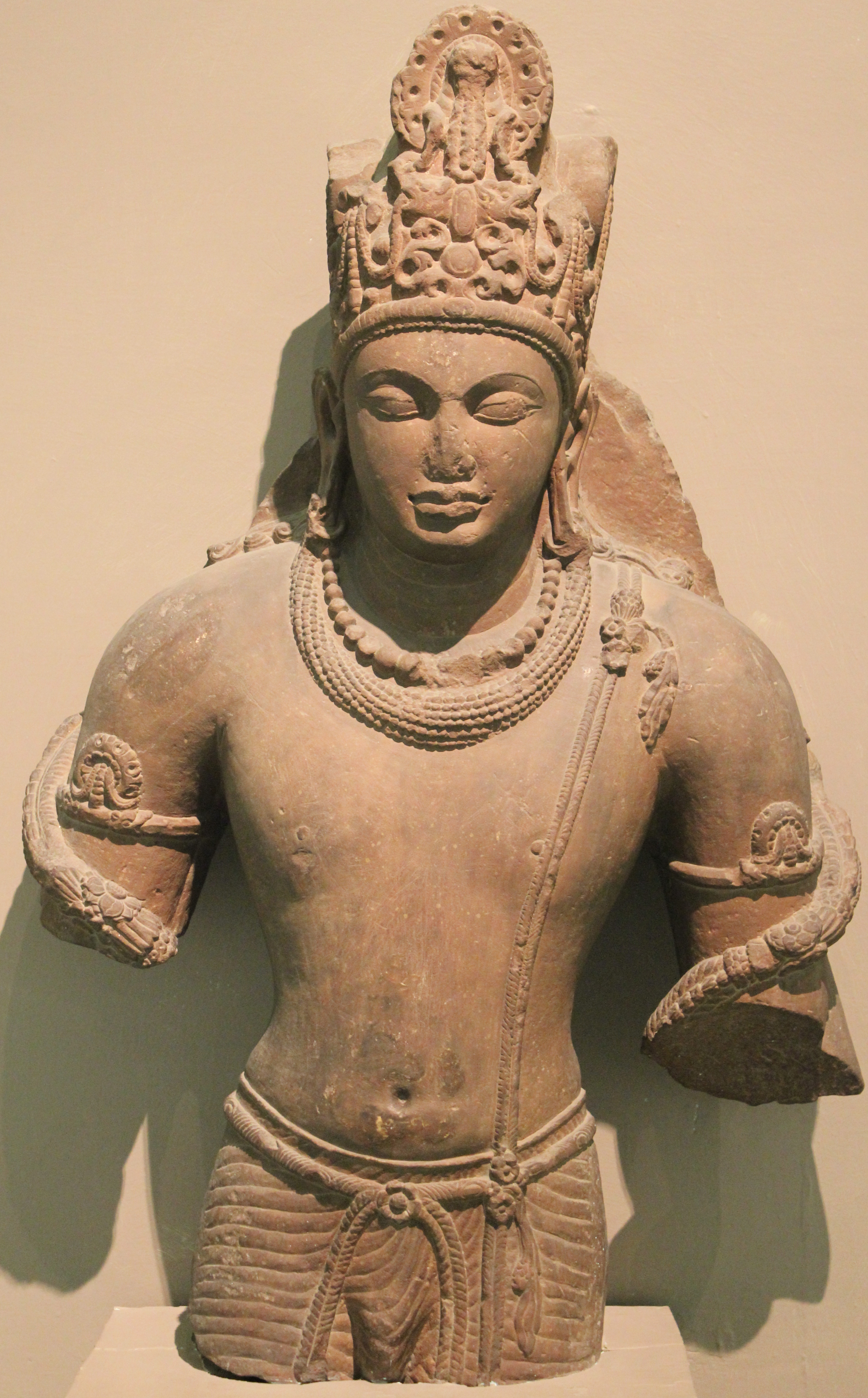
Vishnu, gupta period, mathura

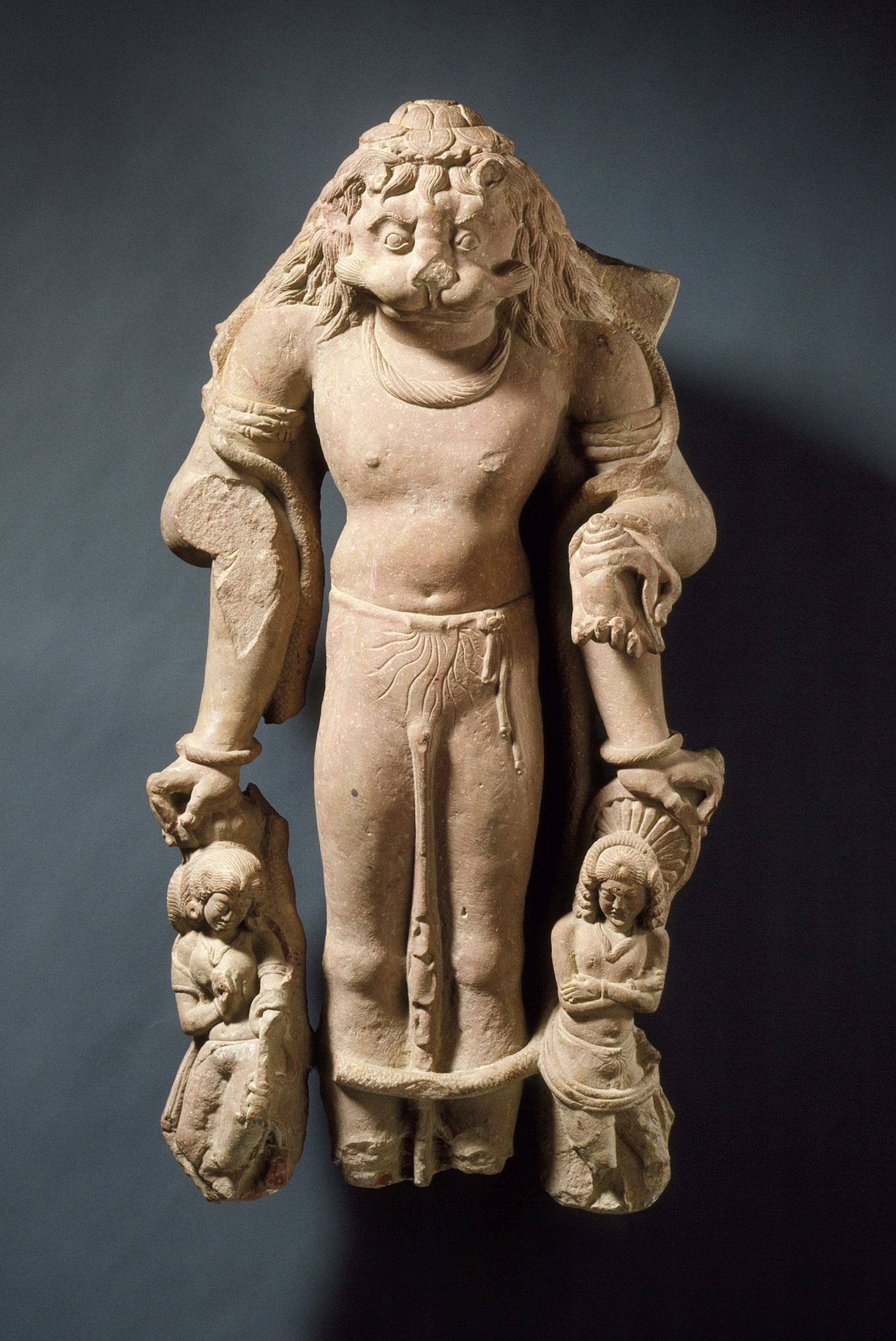
Narasimha, early 6th century, Mathura

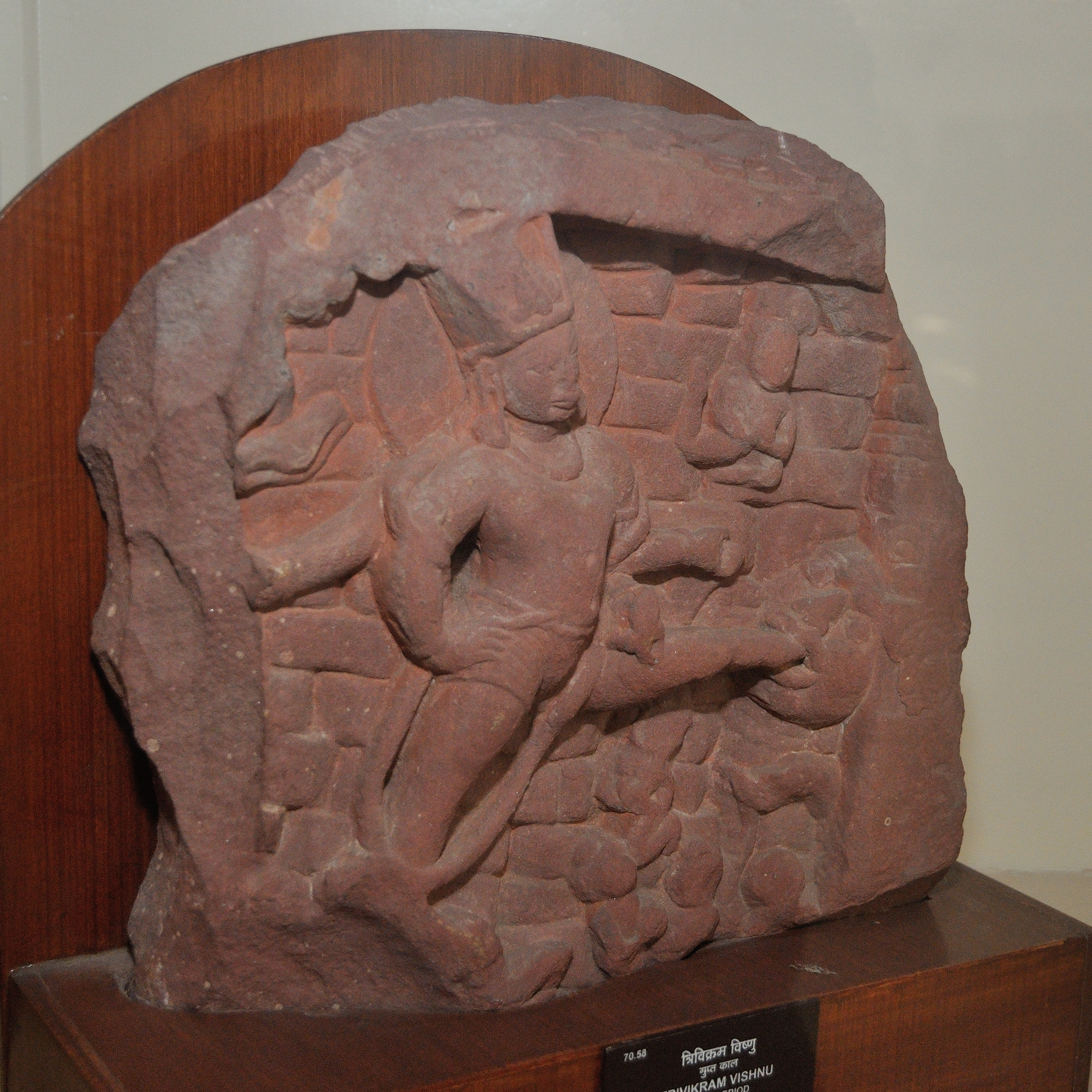
Trivikrama ("Three strides") Vishnu, Mathura, Gupta period.

=== Jain art under the Guptas ===
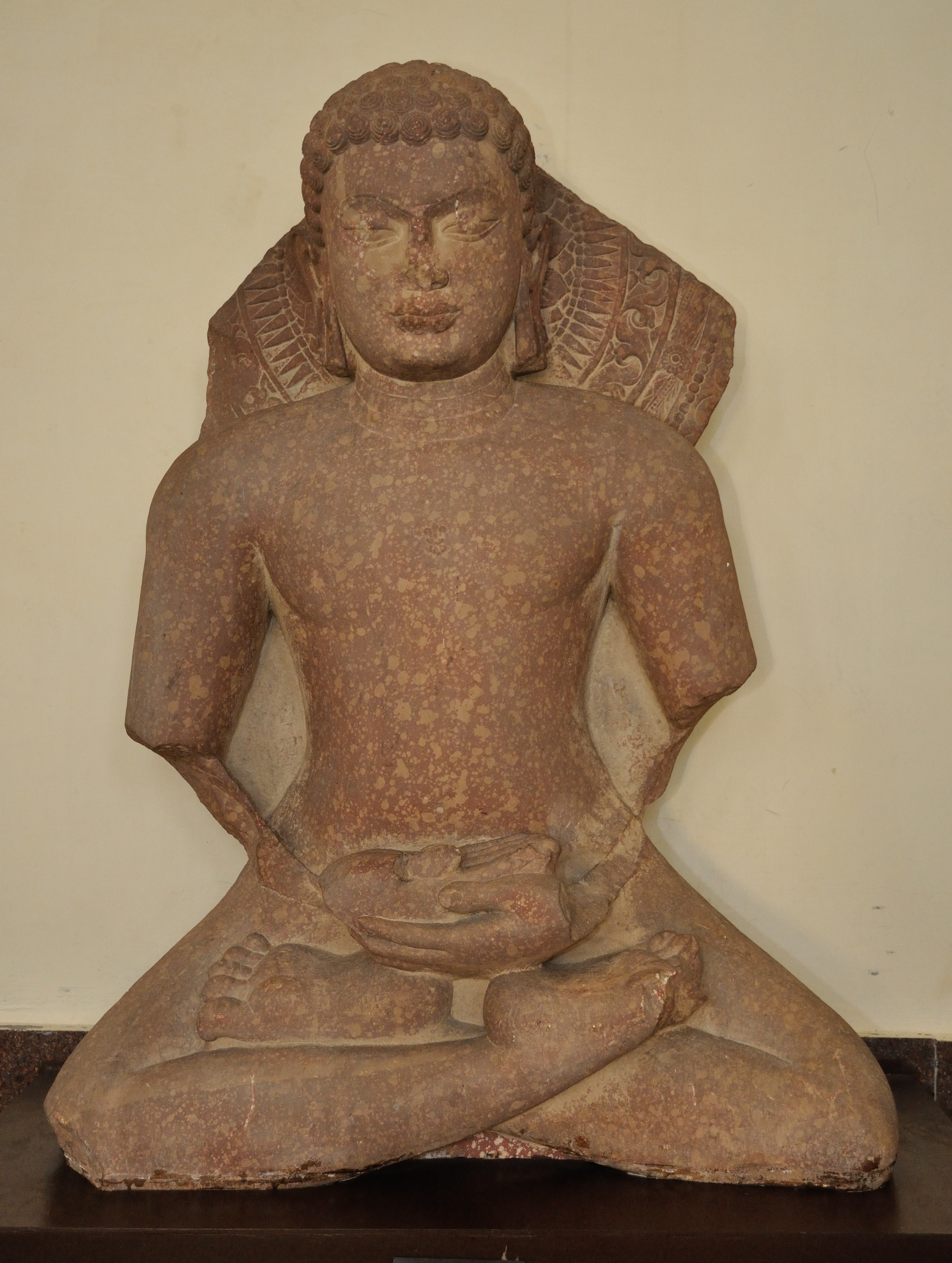
Seated Jain Tirthankara, circa 5th Century CE, Mathura.

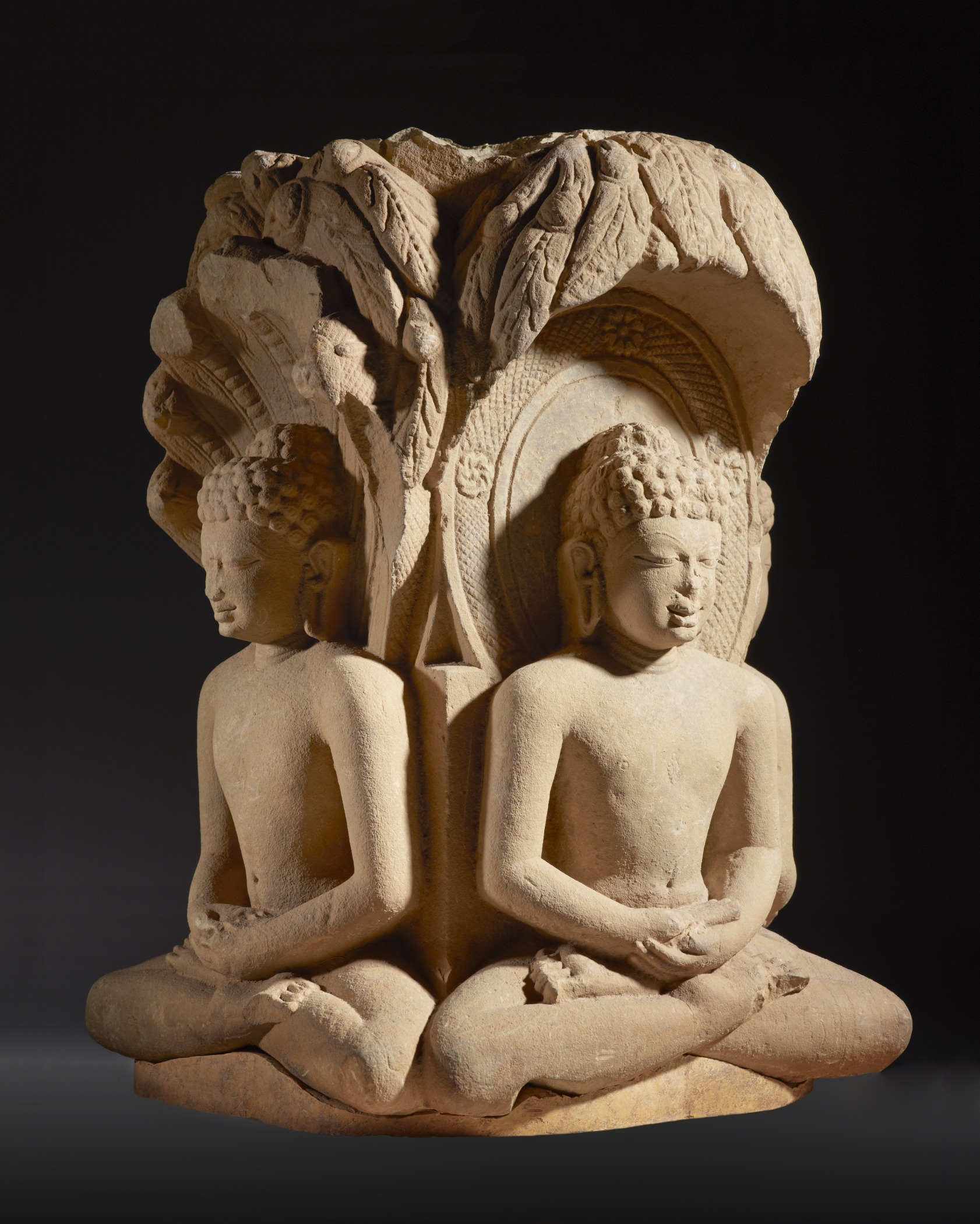
Chaumkha, LACMA, circa 6th Century CE

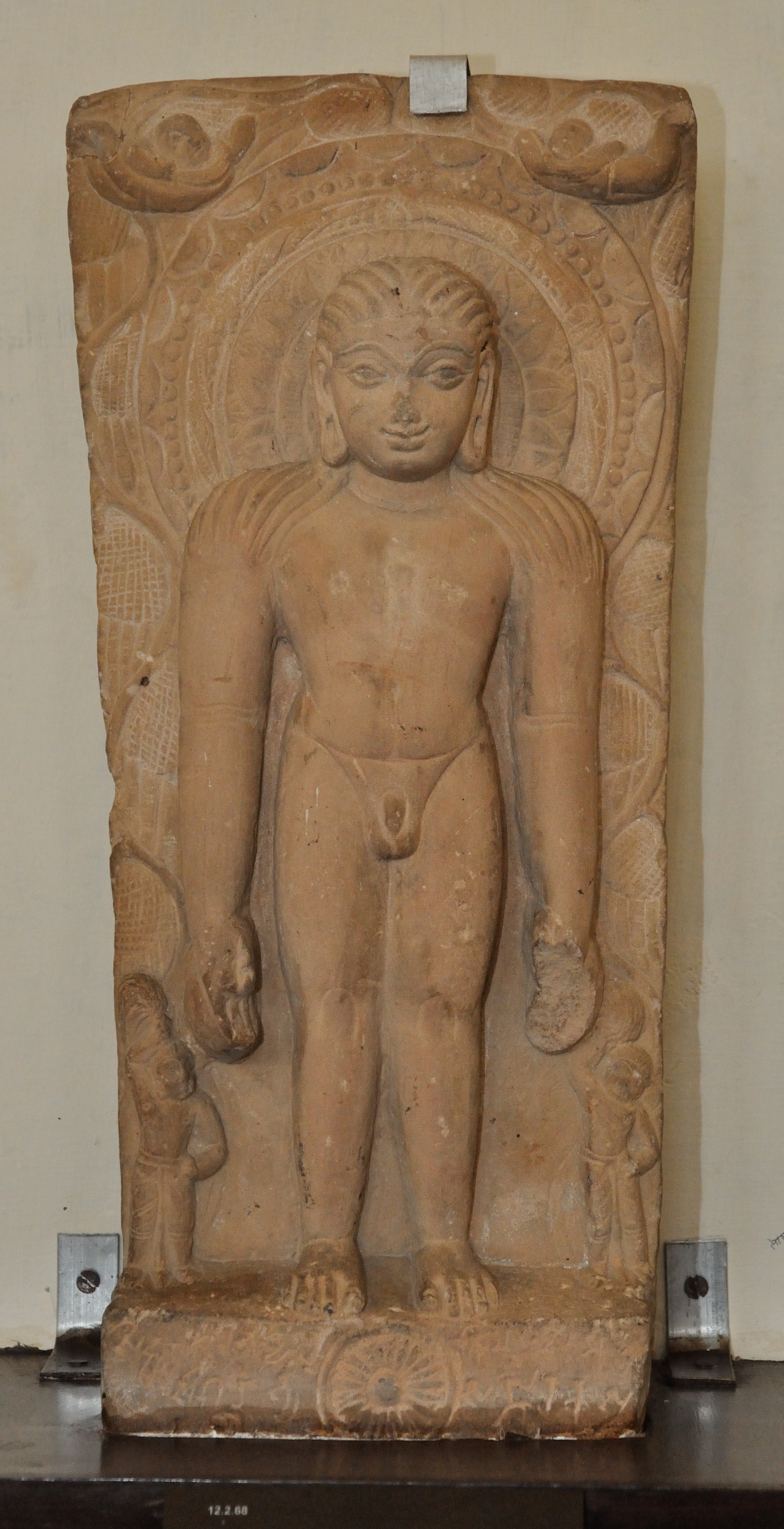
Rishabhanatha, circa 6th Century CE

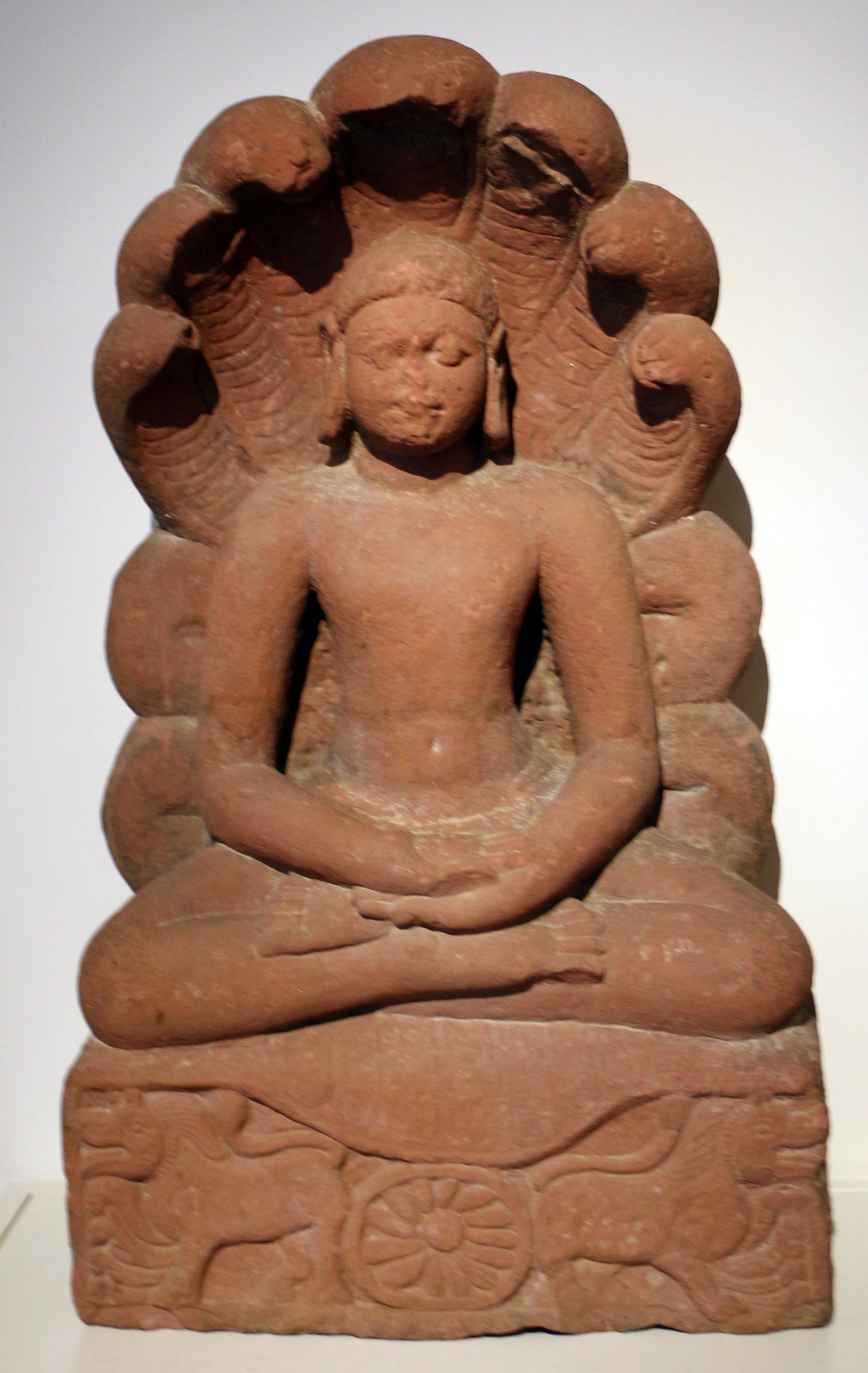
Parshvanatha, circa 6th Century CE

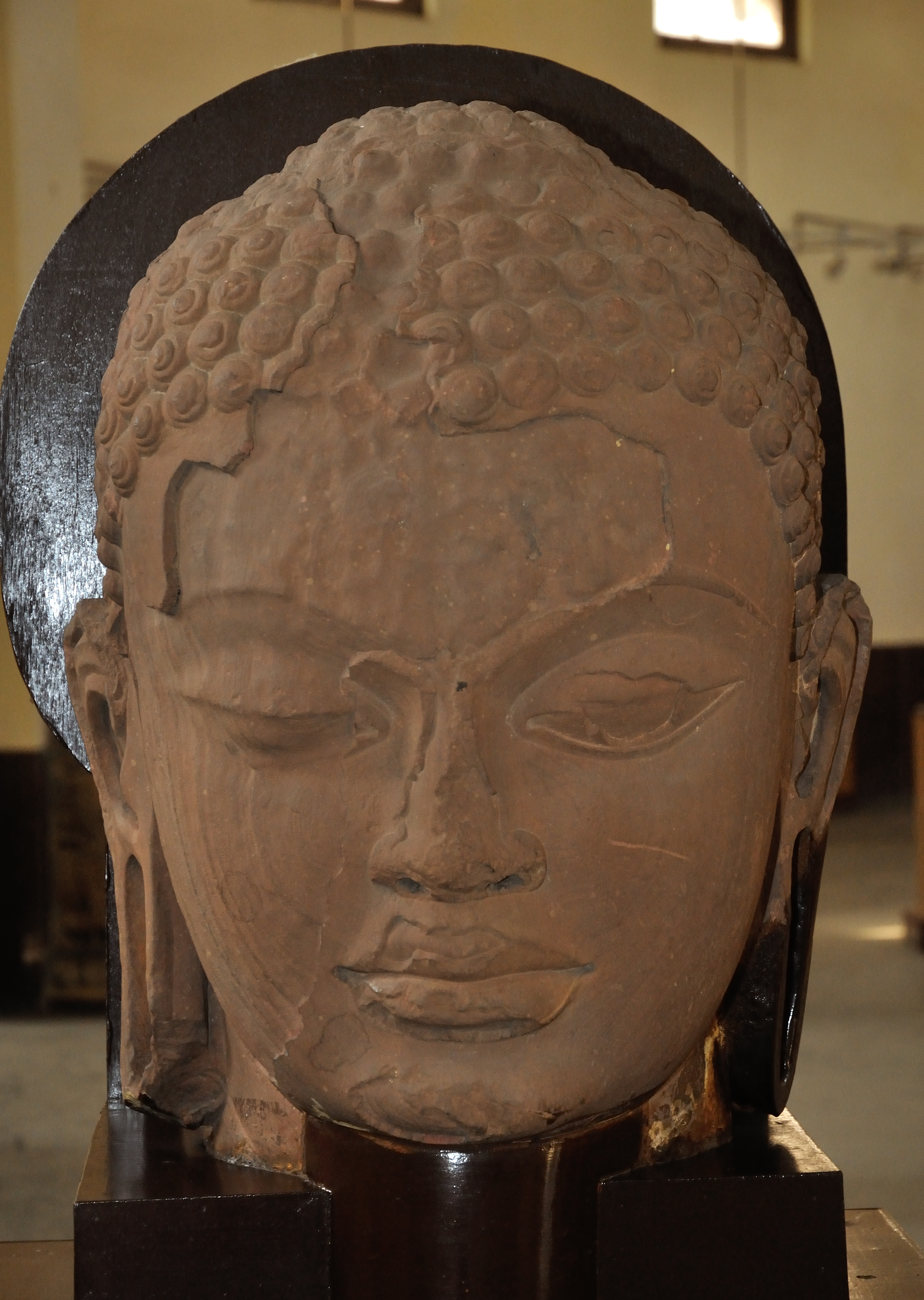
Colossal Head of Jina, Gupta Period, Jain temple of Kankali Tila

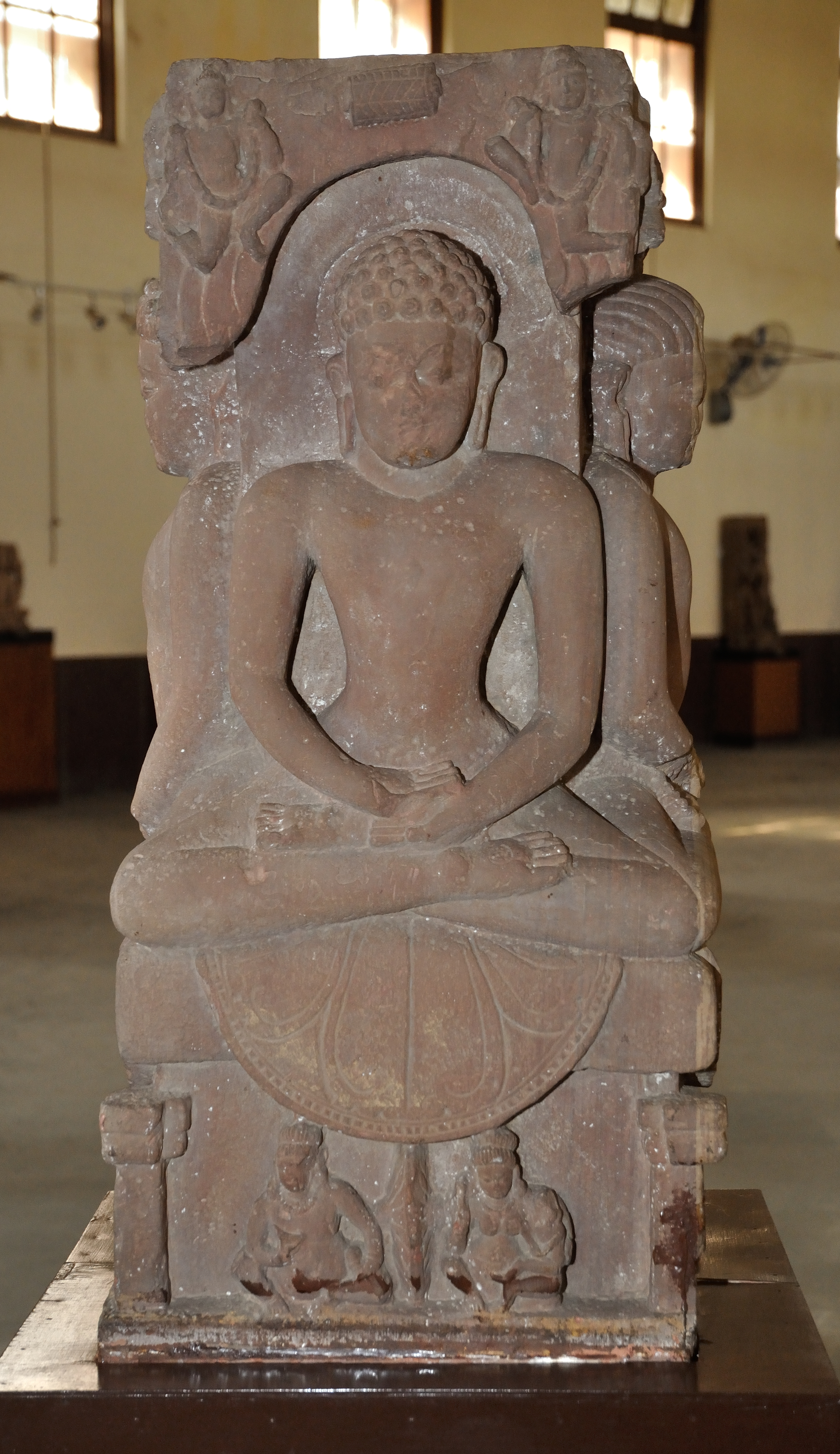
Chaumkha, Mathura Museum, circa 6th Century CE

== Decline with the invasion of the Alchon Huns (6th century CE) ==
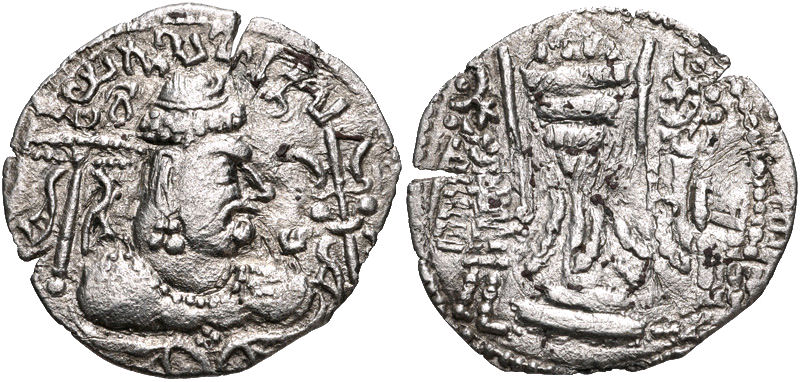
The Huna Mihirakula essentially wiped out the Mathura school of art.

The decline of the Gupta Empire was accompanied by the invasions and the wide-scale destructions of the Hunas Alchon Huns circa 460–530 CE, and an ensuing disorganization of society. These events mark the end of Classical Indian civilisation. The art of Mathura suffered greatly from the destructions brought by the Hunas, as did the art of Gandhara in the northwest, and both schools of art were nearly wiped out under the rule of the Huna Mihirakula.

"Towards the middle of the 6th century, the activity of the Mathura school abruptly ceased, undoubtedly following the ravages of the Huns who had invaded the Gupta empire around 455. It must have died with the art of Gandhara under the persecutions by Mihirakula."

— Henri Parmentier, La sculpture de Mathurâ

== Medieval period (7th–16th century) ==
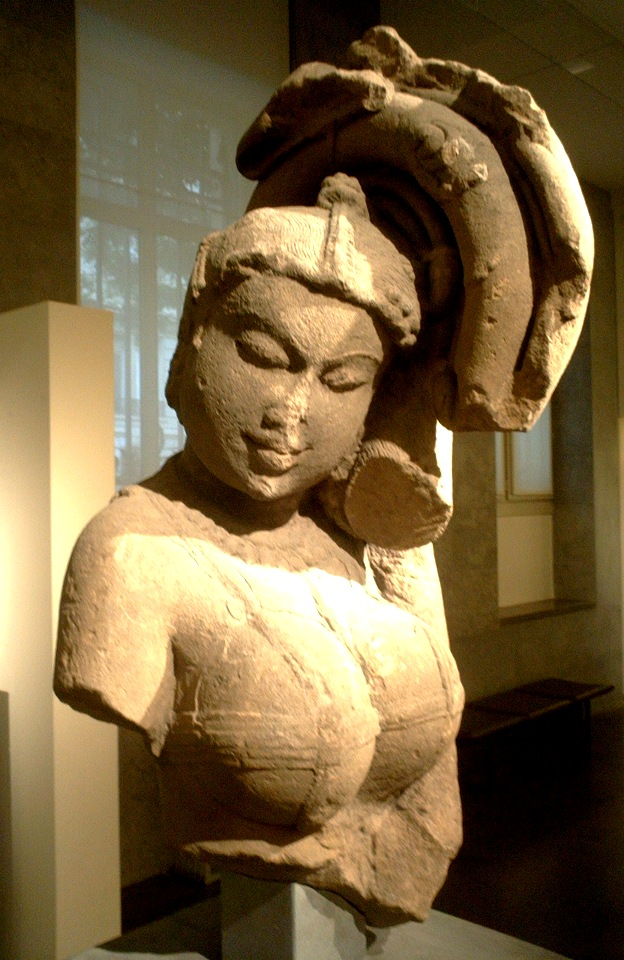
A Yakshini, 10th century, Mathura, India. Guimet Museum.

The Medieval period followed, in which Hindu art became largely prevalent in the art of Mathura and India as a whole. It was accompanied by the decline of Buddhism in the Indian subcontinent.

In many ways, Gupta art had represented the zenith of the art of Mathura, with its beautiful and elegant creations. In the medieval period, efforts were made at emulating Gupta art, but the technical level in sculpture decreased significantly. Many of the qualities found in Gupta art start to vanish during this period, such as the spituality of the sculptures, their elegant slimness and suppleness. As the country disintegrated, so did the arts, the artistic rendering becoming coarse, formal and stereotyped. Some decadent effects are obtained by the increase in ornament, the enlargement of crowns, the multiplication of arms and the profusion of attendant deities. The rendering of the human figure becomes rather artificial and highly stylized, relying heavily on the curbed Tribhanga pose.

=== Hindu art in the Medieval period ===
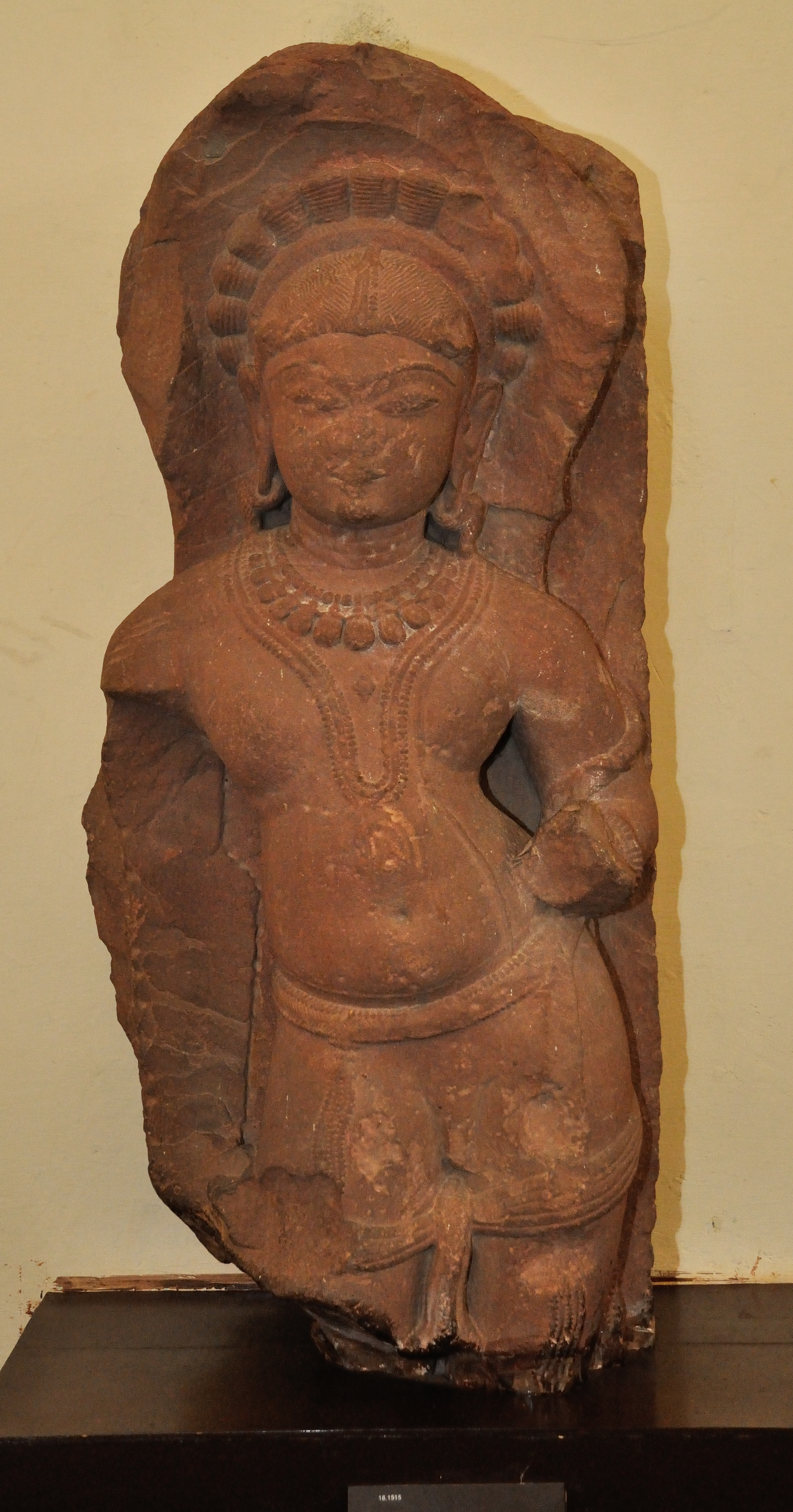
Balarama from Mathura, Early Medieval period (8th-13th century CE).

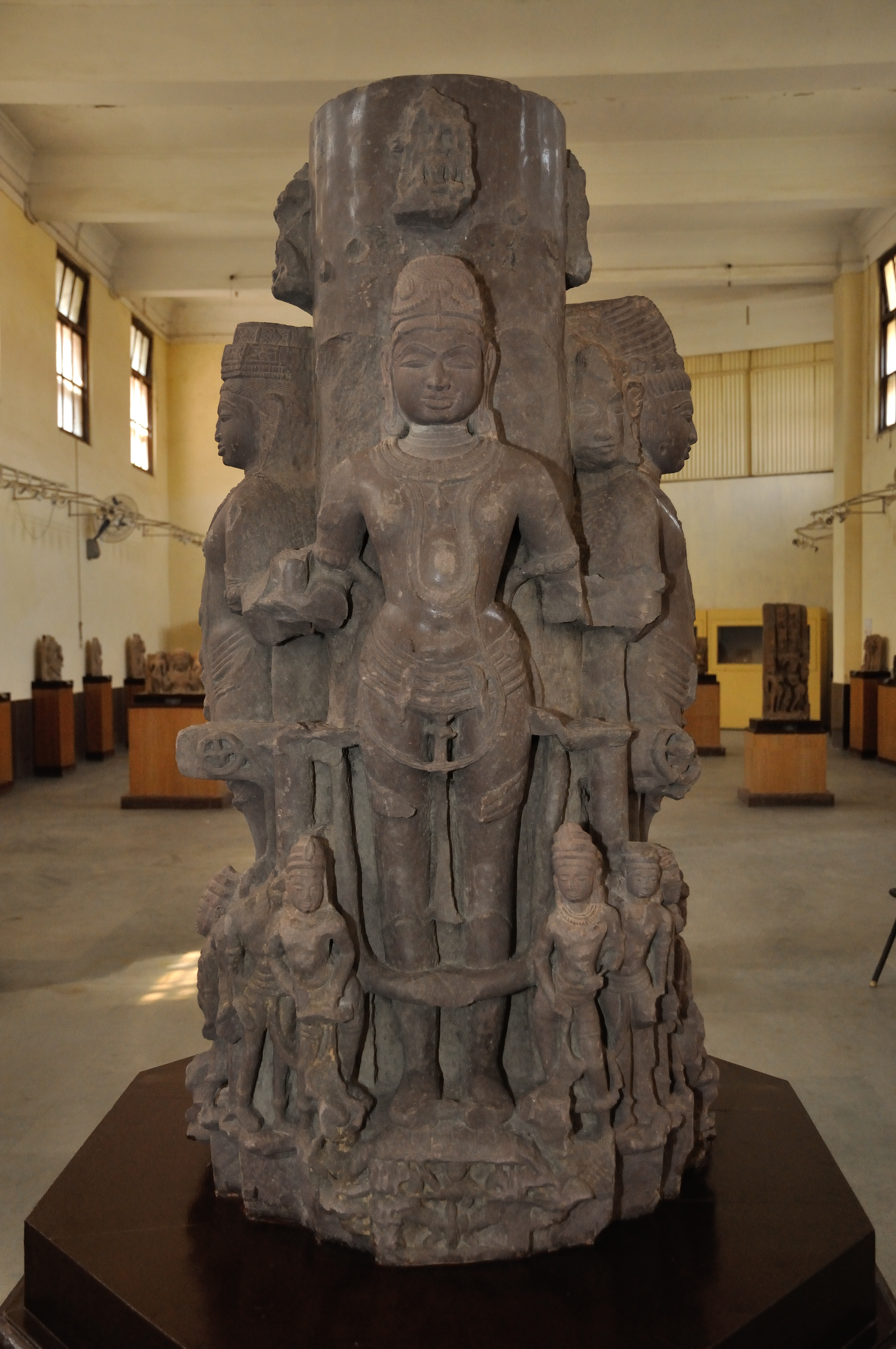
Sarvatobhadra Shiva Linga Representing Brahma Vishnu Maheshwar and Surya, Circa 9th Century CE

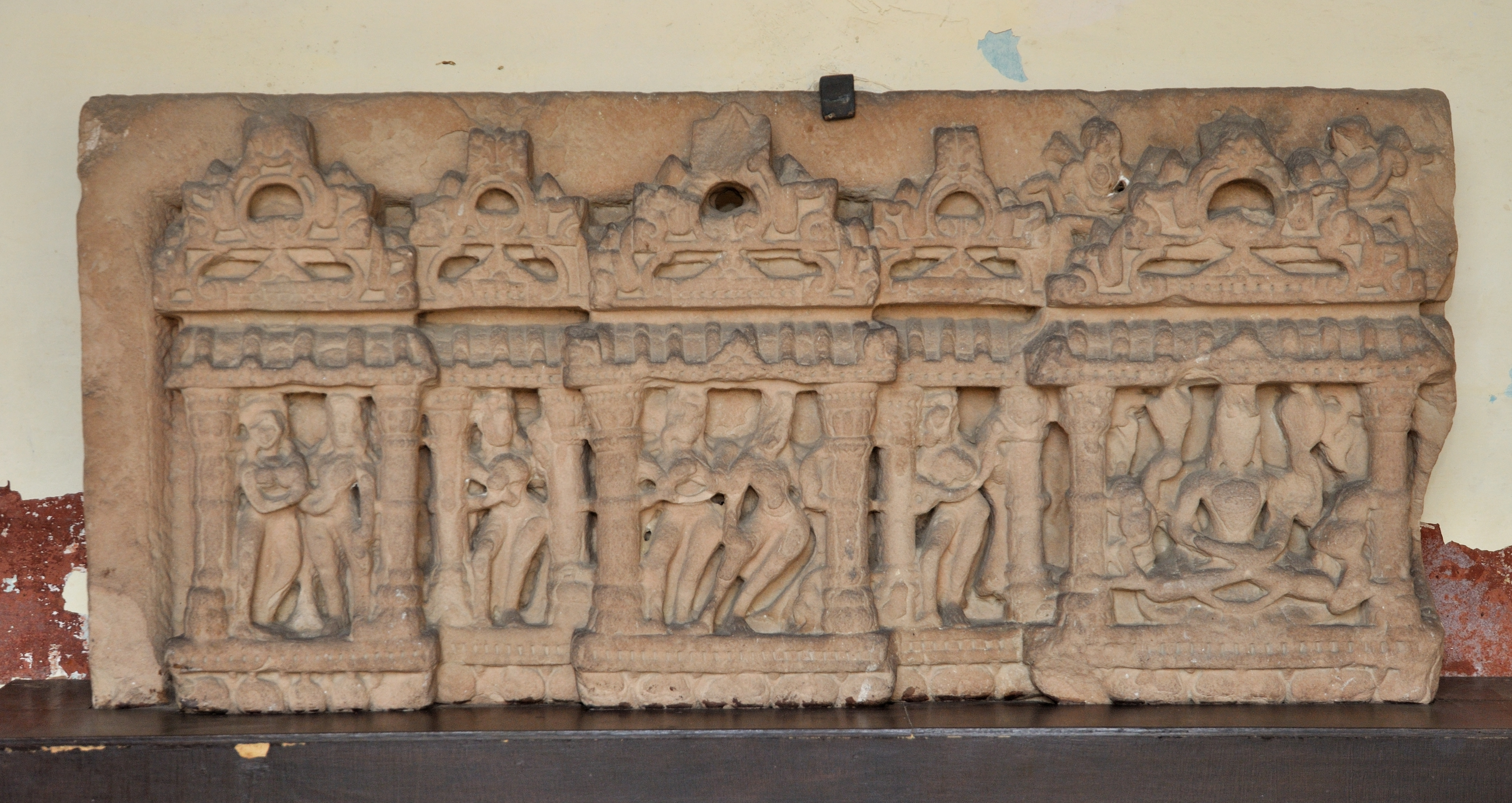
Architectural Fragment with Divine Figures, circa 10th century CE

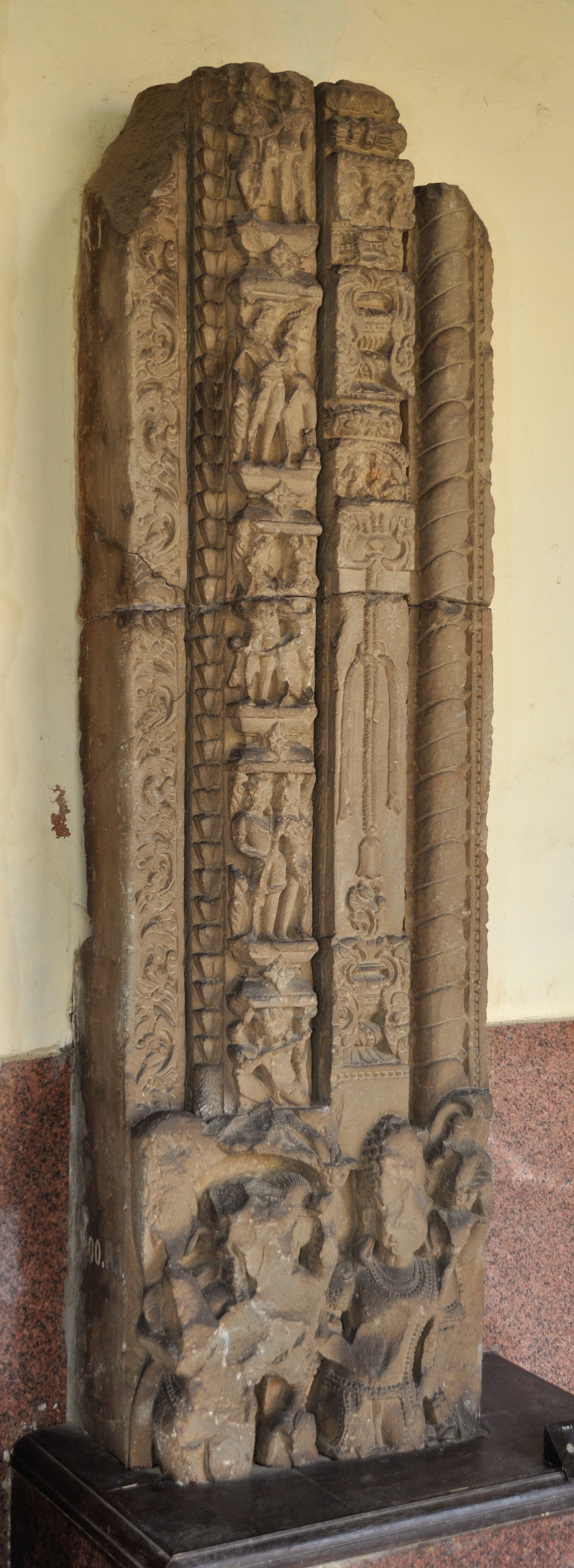
Decorative Door Jamb - Medieval Period

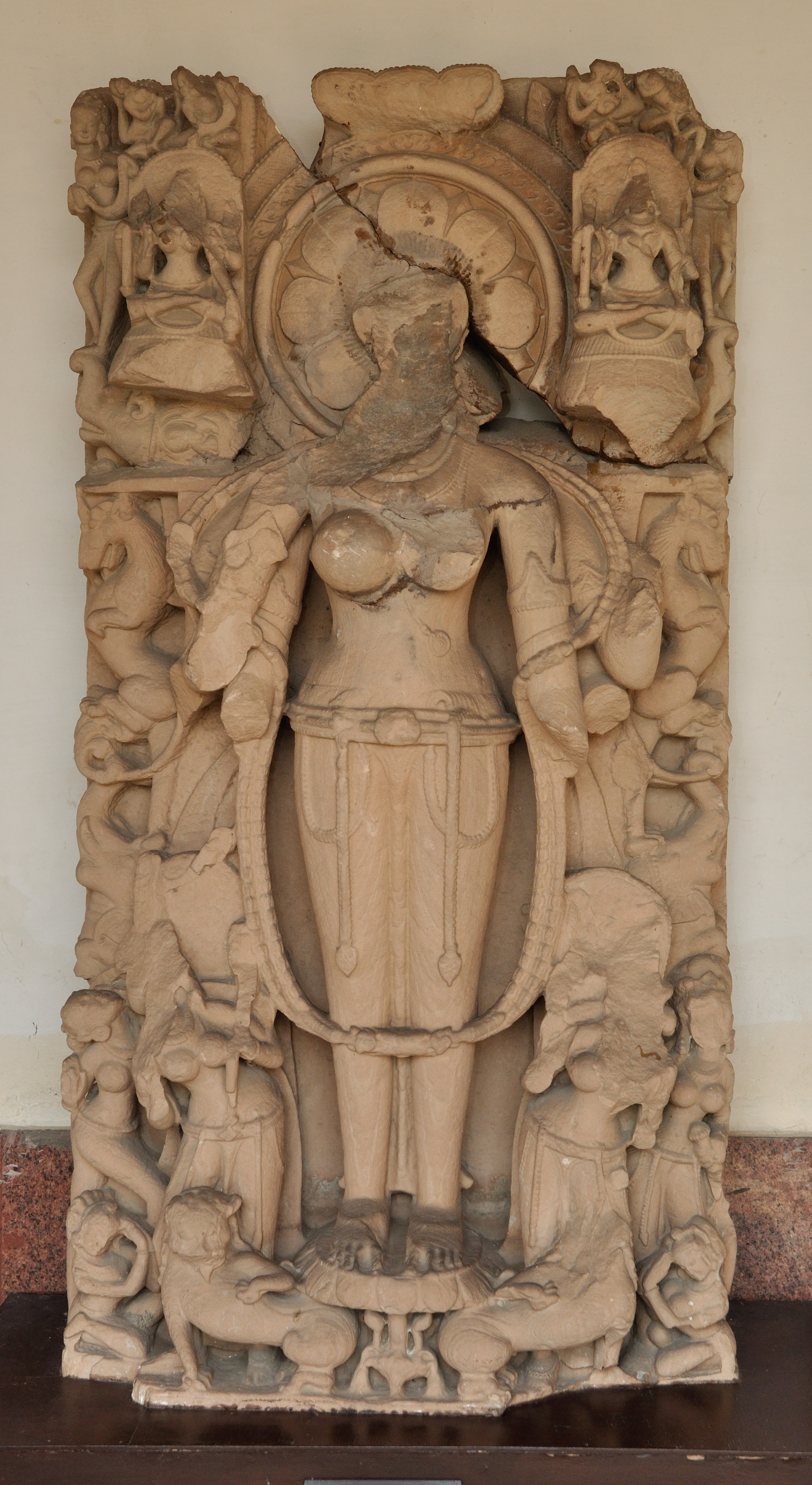
Durga, Medieval Period

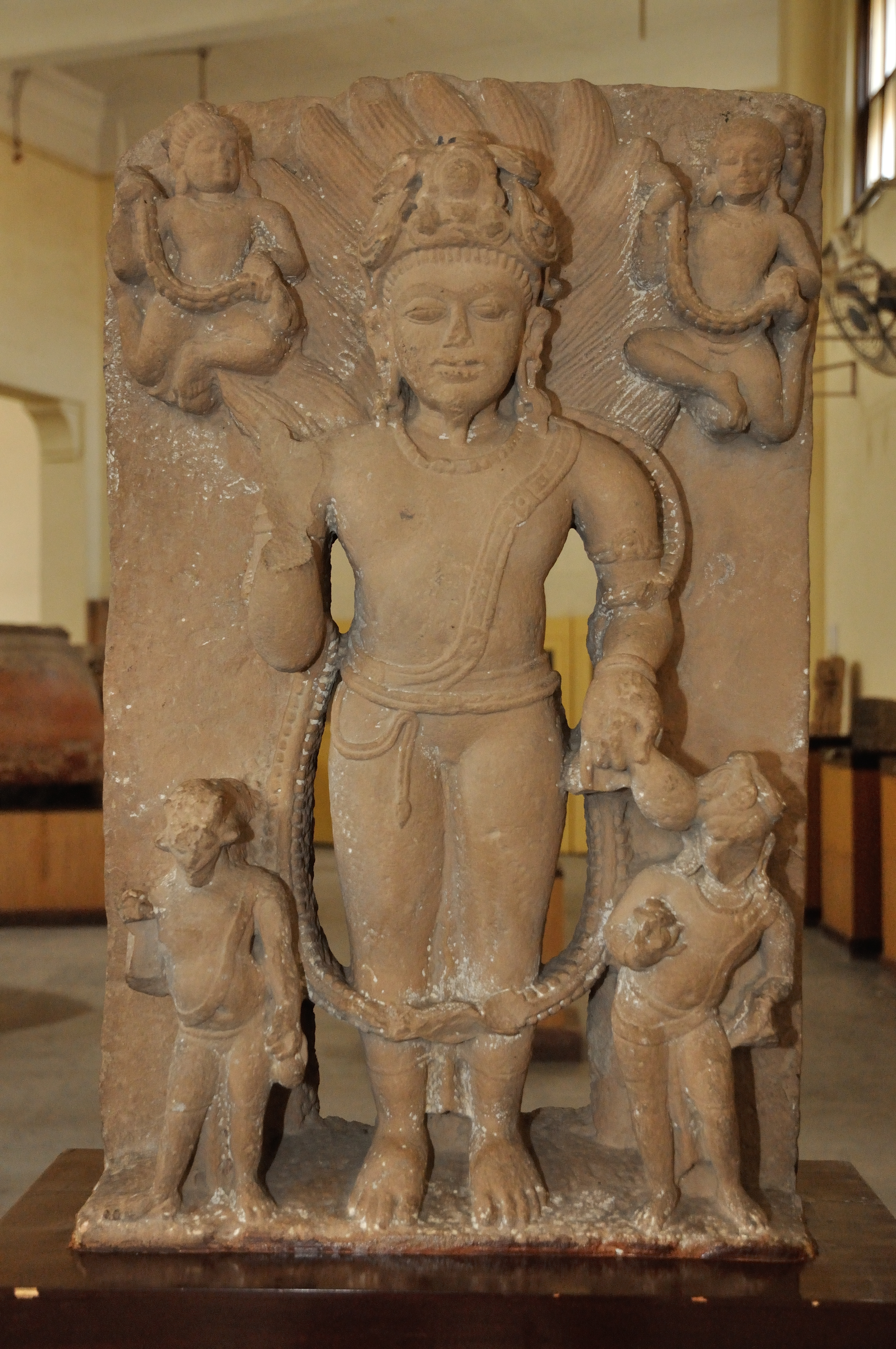
Fire God, Medieval Period

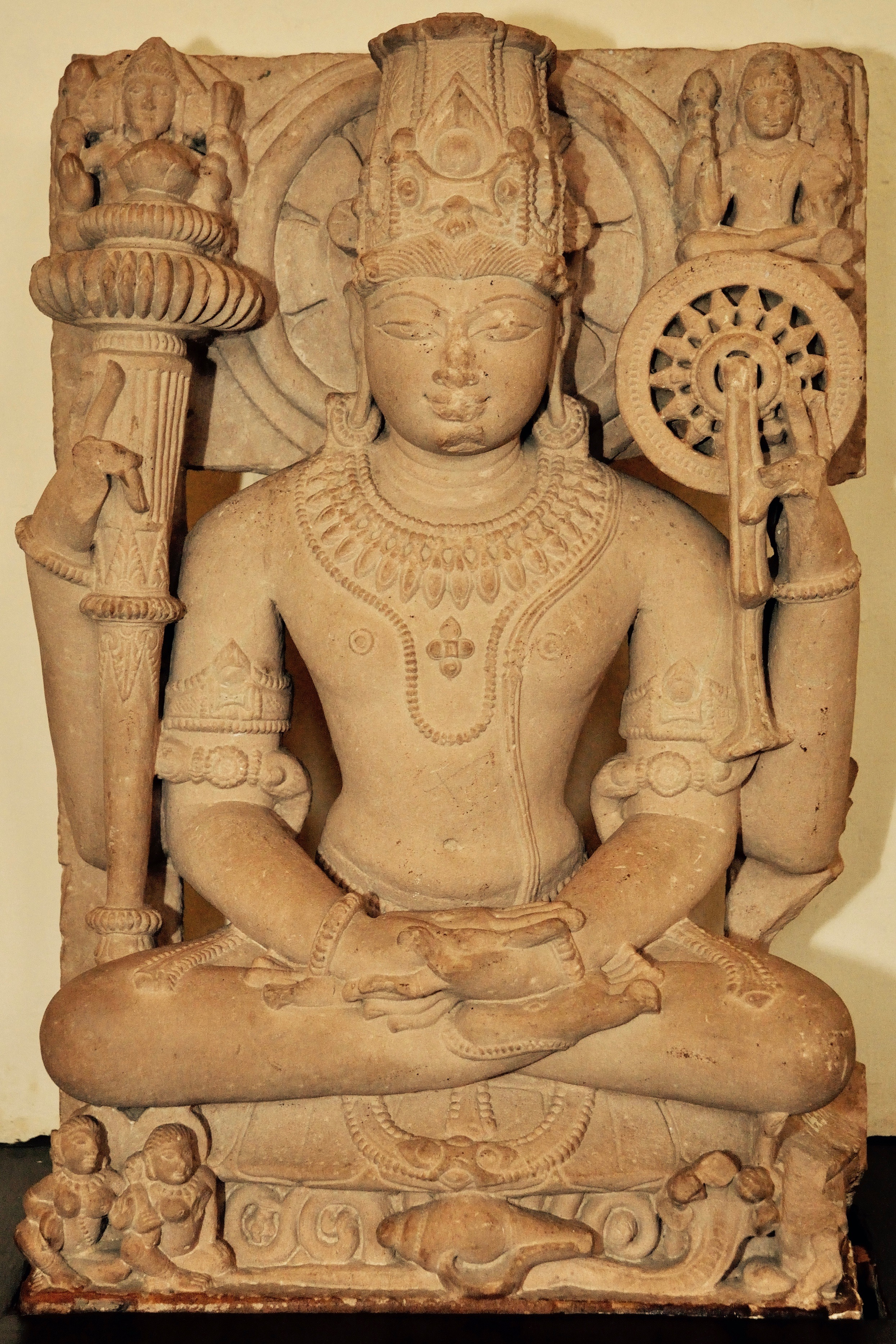
Four-armed Seated Vishnu in Meditation, Mediaeval Period

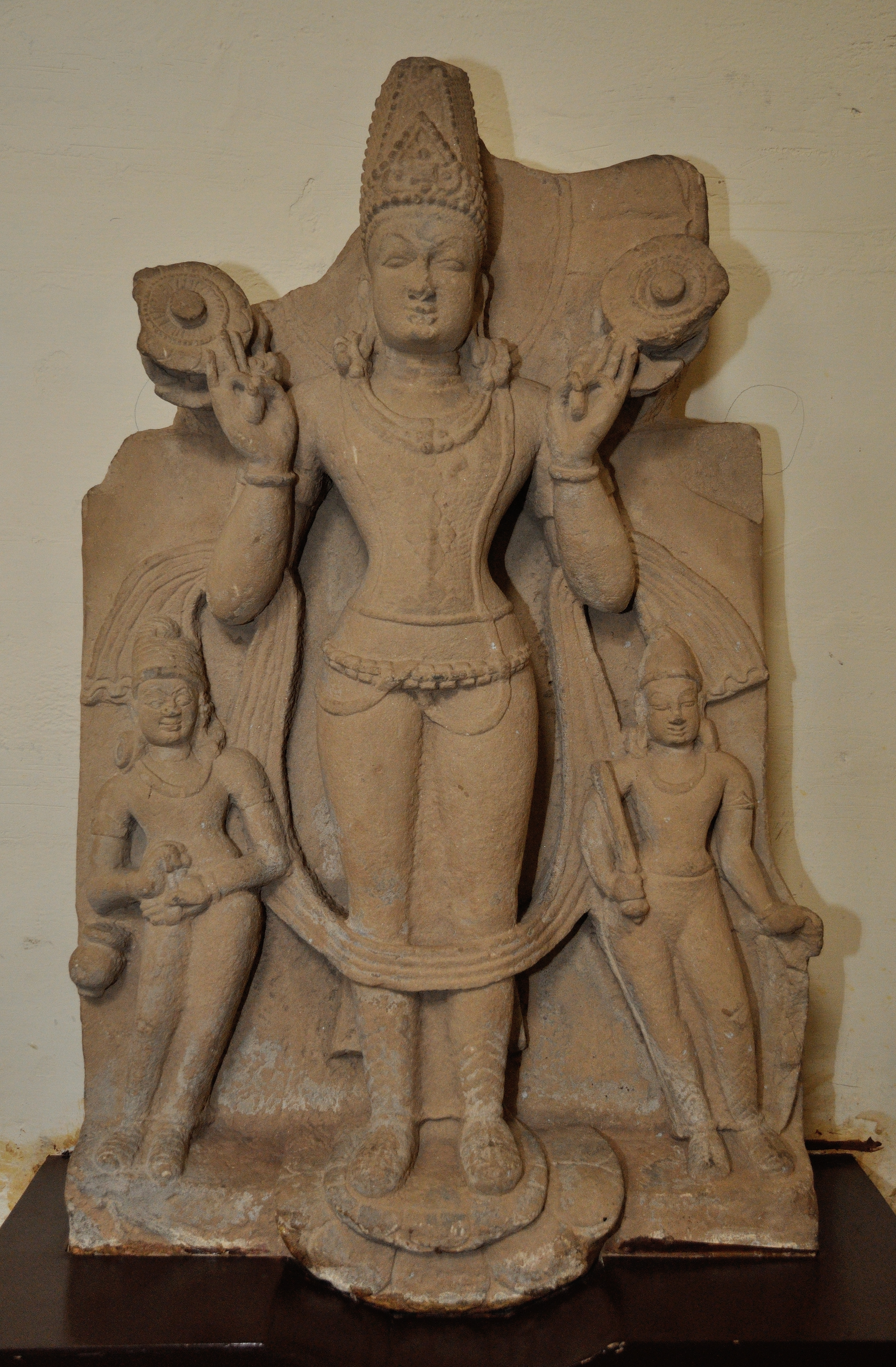
Standing Surya, Medieval Period

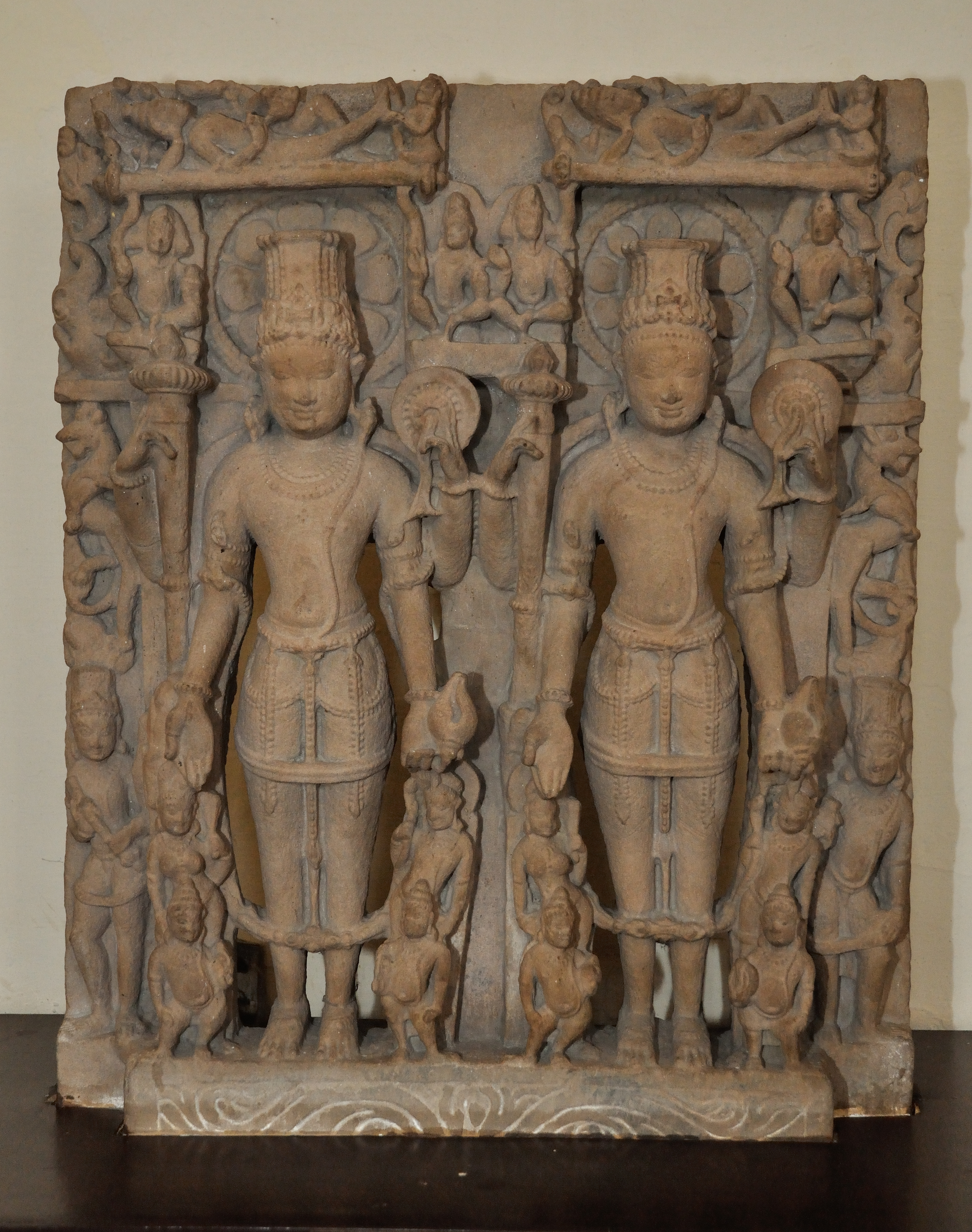
Standing Twin Vishnu, Circa 10th Century CE

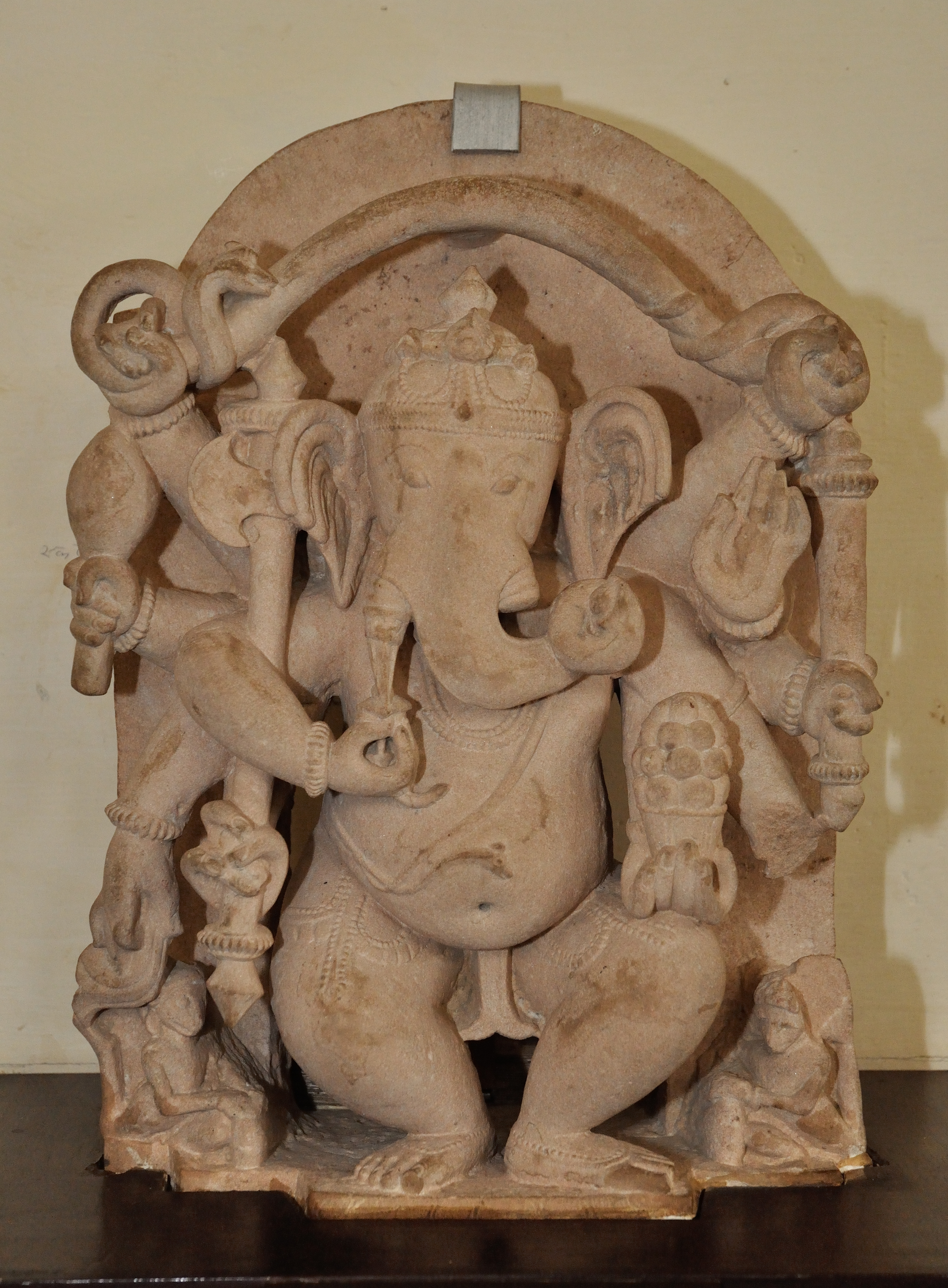
Ten-armed Ganesha, Medieval Period

=== Jain art in the Medieval period ===
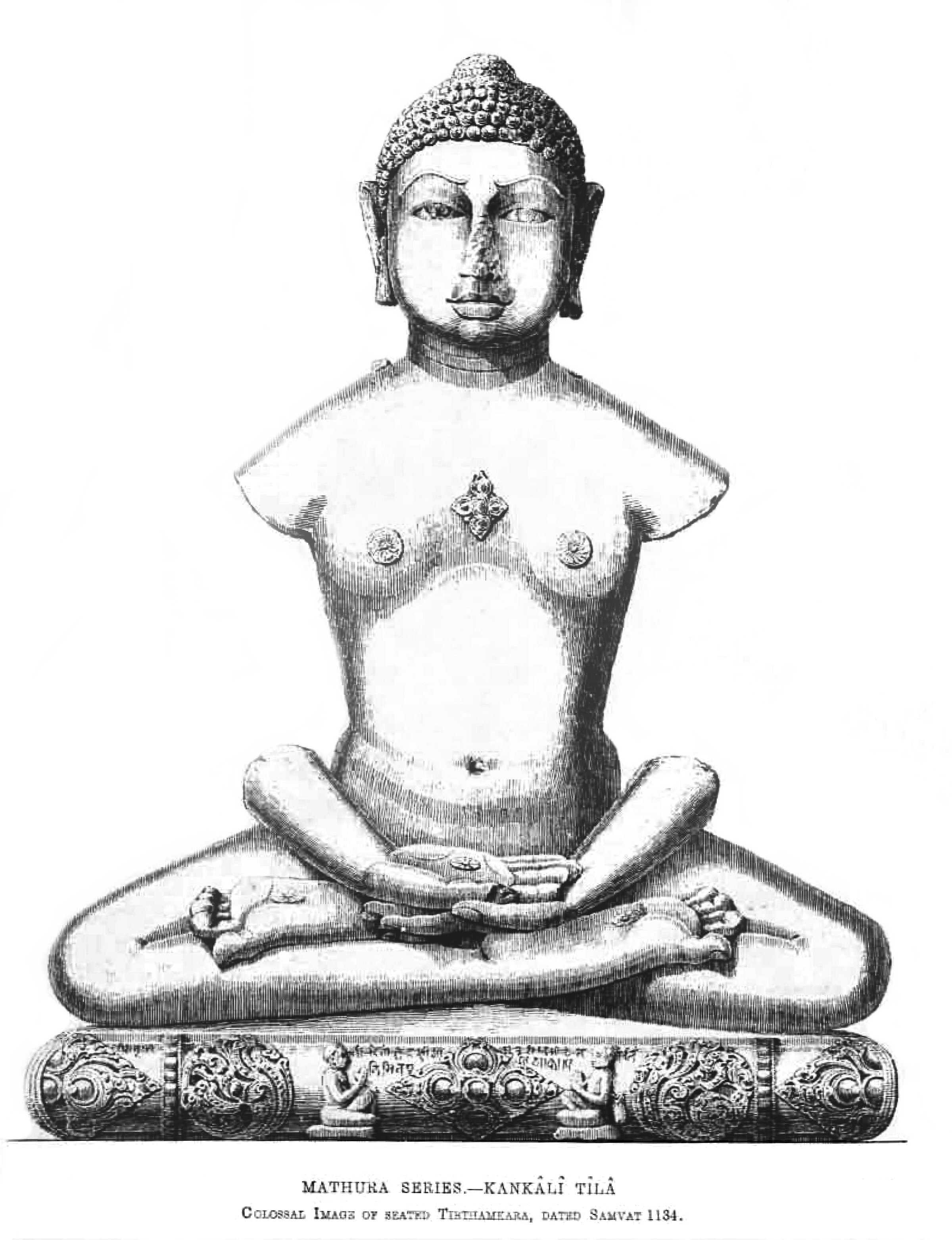
Jain statue inscribed Samvat 1134 (1077 CE), about 60 years after the sack of Mathura by Mahmud of Ghazni. Kankali Tila, Mathura.

Jain art continued to be quite active during the period, with several known and dated works of art.

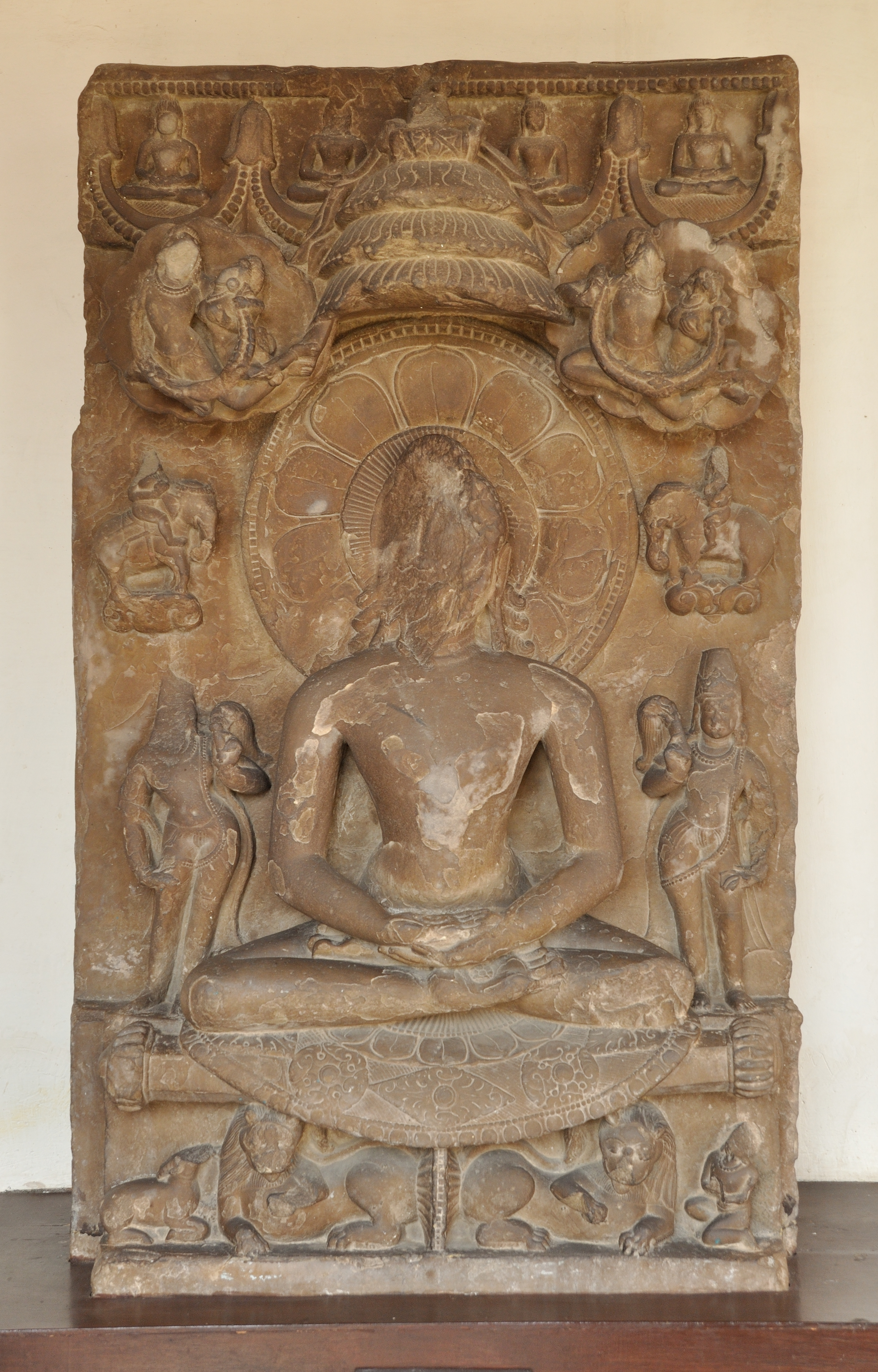
1st Jain Tirthankara Rishabhanatha, Circa 8th Century CE, Barsana

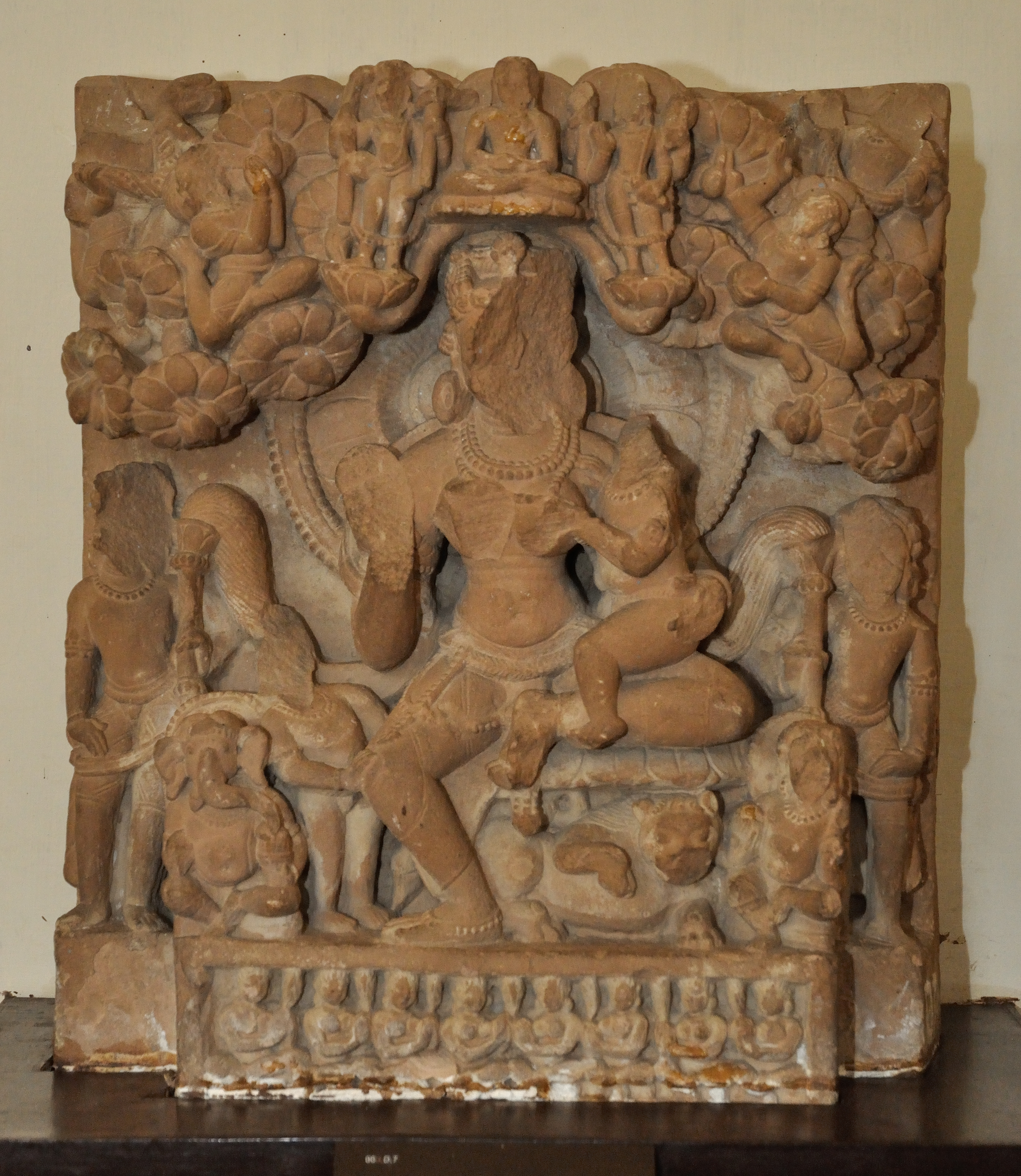
Ambika, Medieval Period

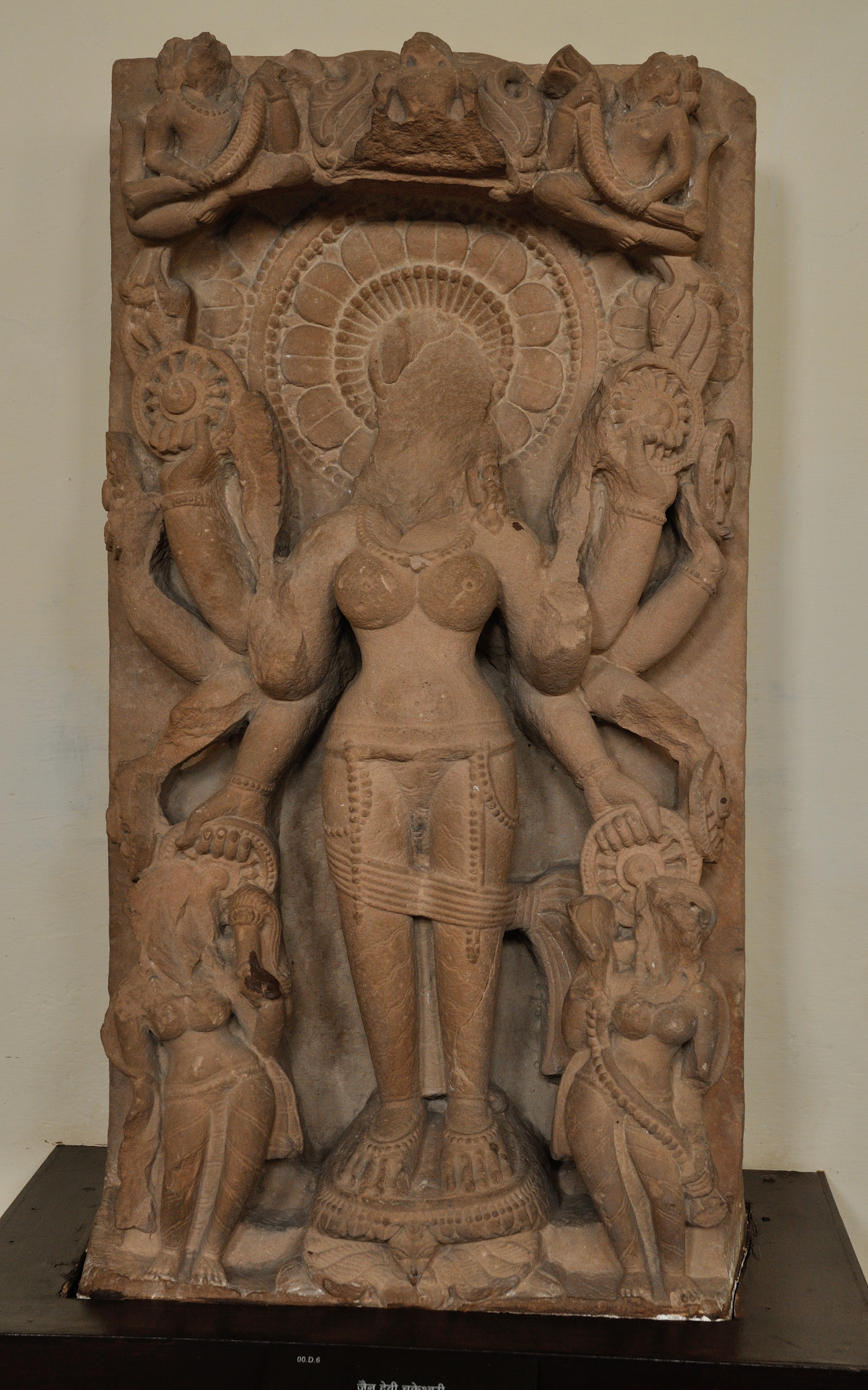
Jain Goddess Chakreshwari, Kankali Mound, Circa 10th Century CE

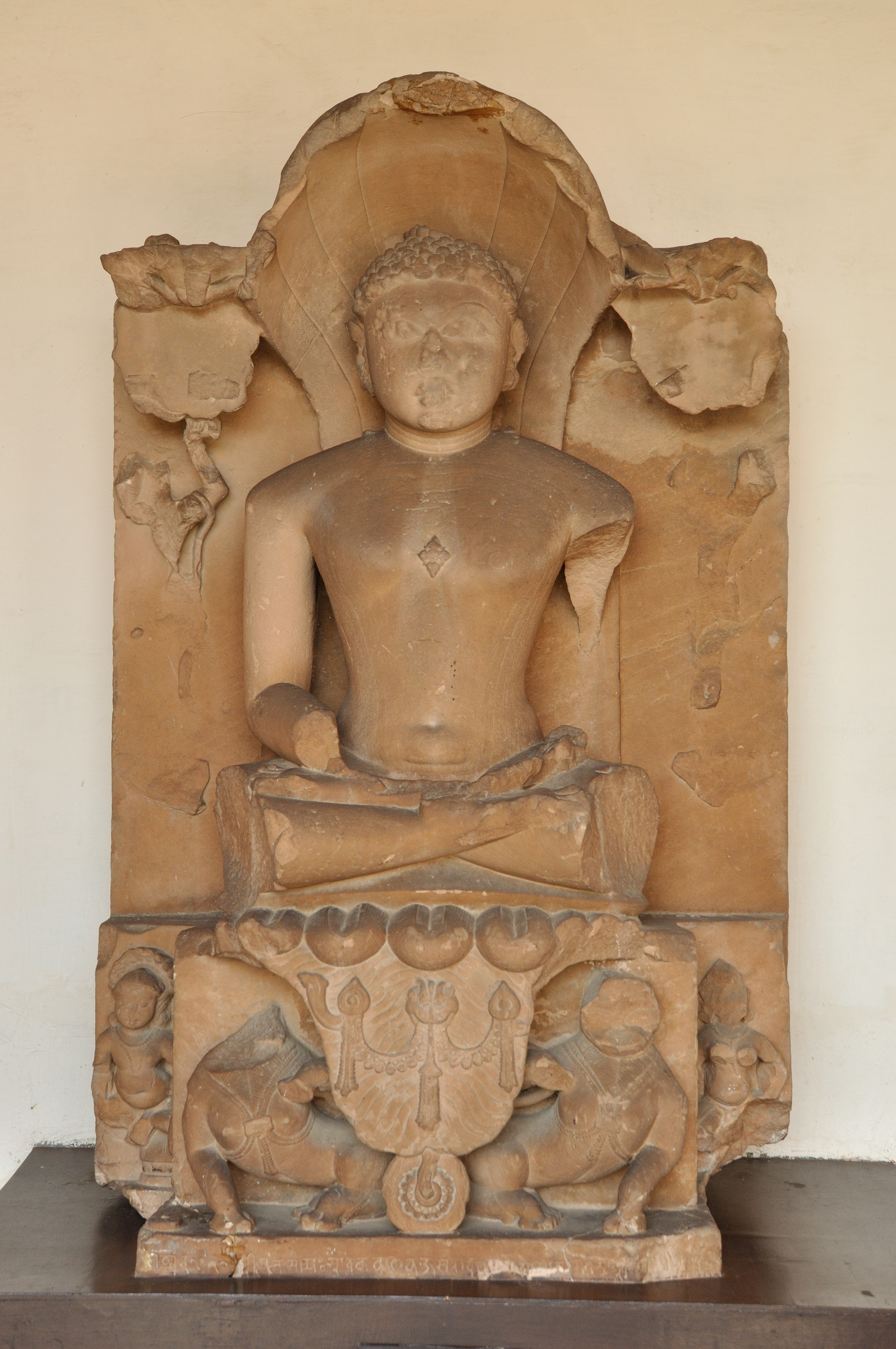
Jain Tirthankara Parshwanath, inscribed 1014 CE, Kagarol

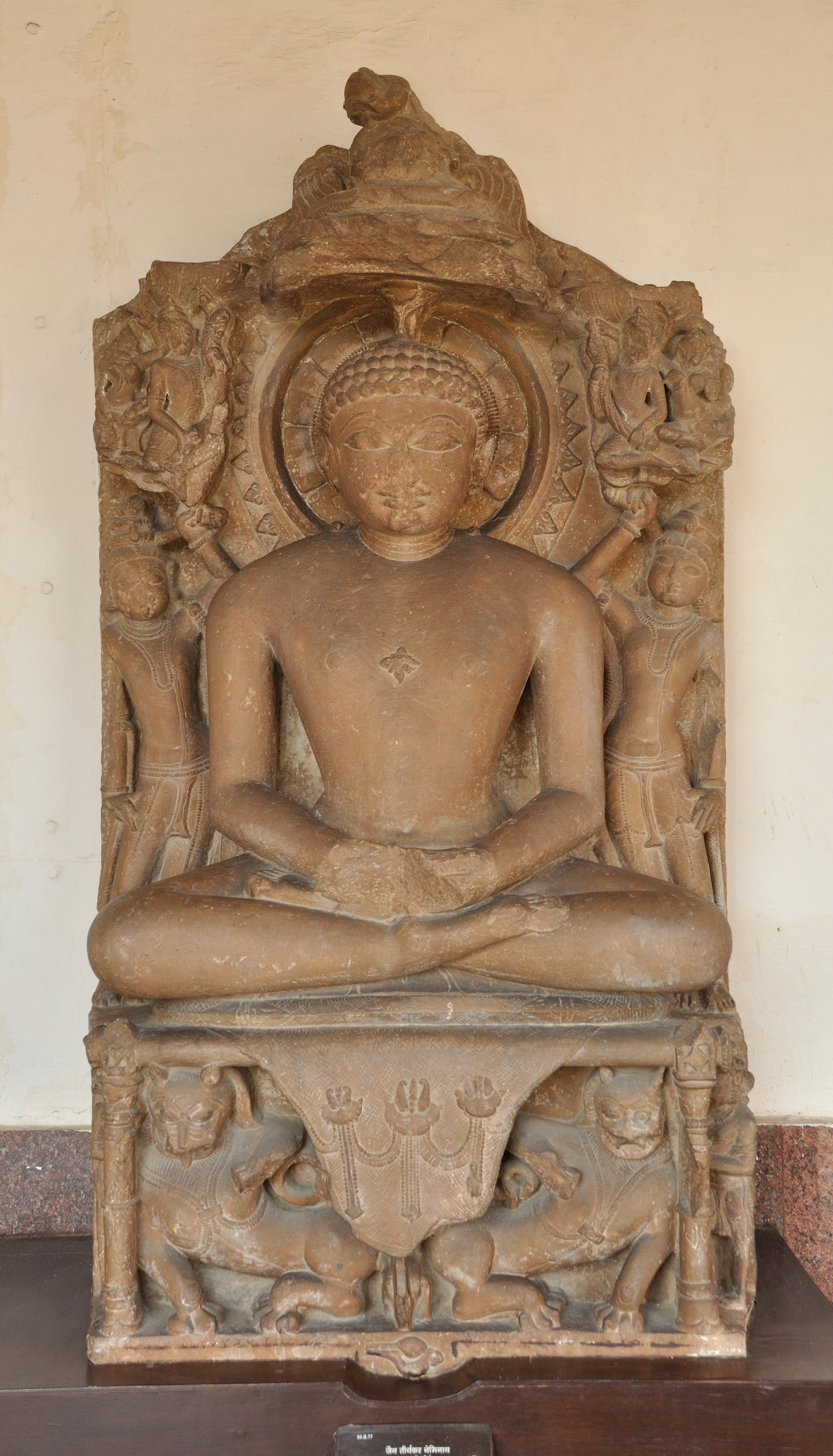
Jain Tirthankara Neminath, Circa 12th Century CE

=== Sack of Mathura by Mahmud of Ghazni (1018 CE) ===
In 1018, Mahmud of Ghazni, ruler of the Ghaznavid Empire, laid waste to the city of Mathura, which was "ruthlessly sacked, ravaged, desecrated and destroyed". In particular, Al-utbi mentioned in work Tarikh-e-yamini, that Mahmud Ghaznavi destroyed a "great and magnificent temple" in Mathura. According to Muhammad Qasim Hindu Shah, writing an "History of Hindustan" in the 16th-17th century, the city of Mathura was the richest in India, and was consecrated to Vāsudeva-Krishna. When it was attacked by Mahmud of Ghazni, "all the idols" were burnt and destroyed during a period of twenty days, gold and silver was smelted for booty, and the city was burnt down.

Despite the destructions, some level of artistic production continued afterward, as some Jain statues for example are dated to several decades after the 1018 sack of the city.

== Early modern to modern period (16th–21st century) ==
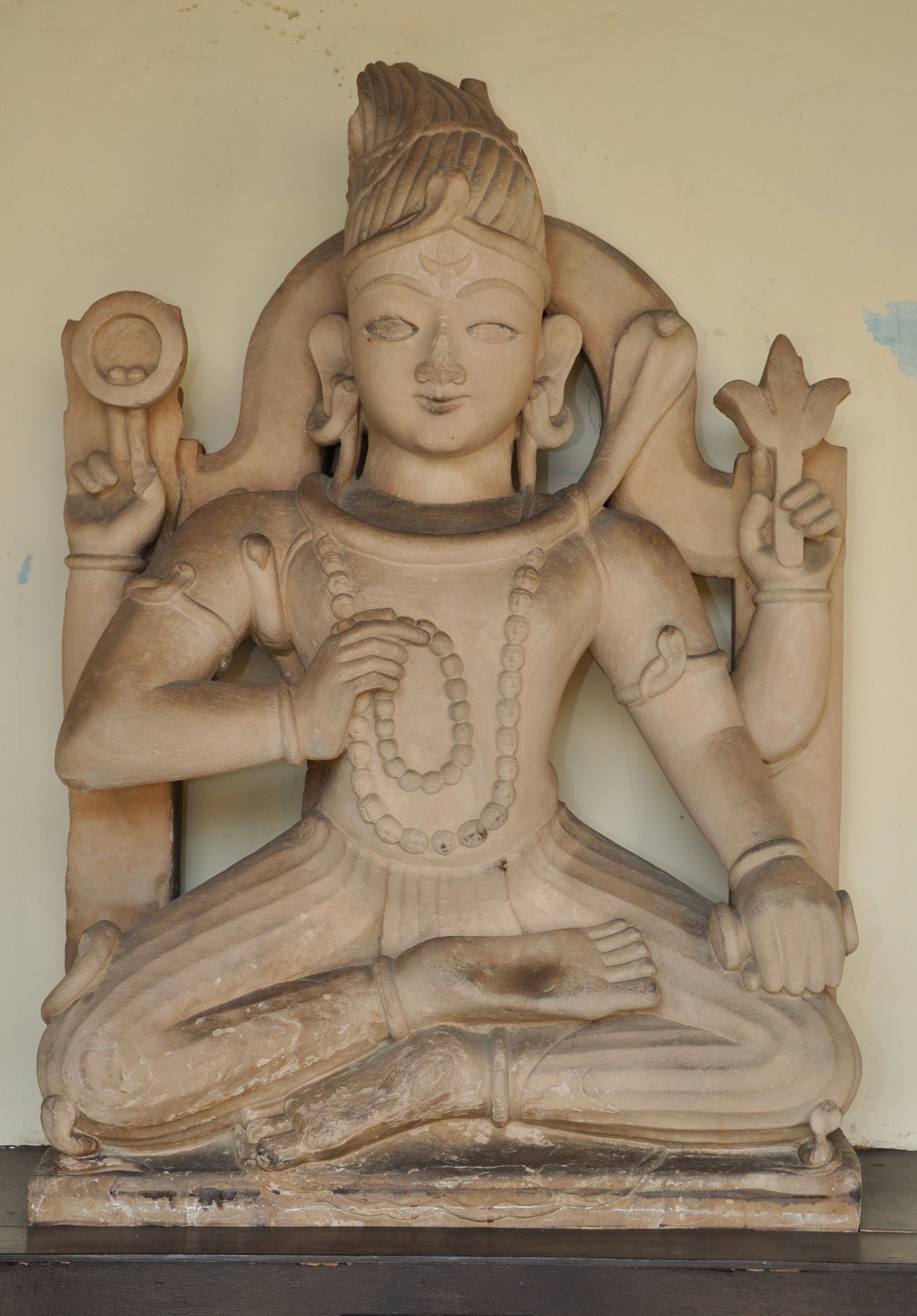
Seated Shiva, Modern Period

The art of Mathura in the Early modern period was going through a lower period of activity, with comparatively fewer remaining works of art.

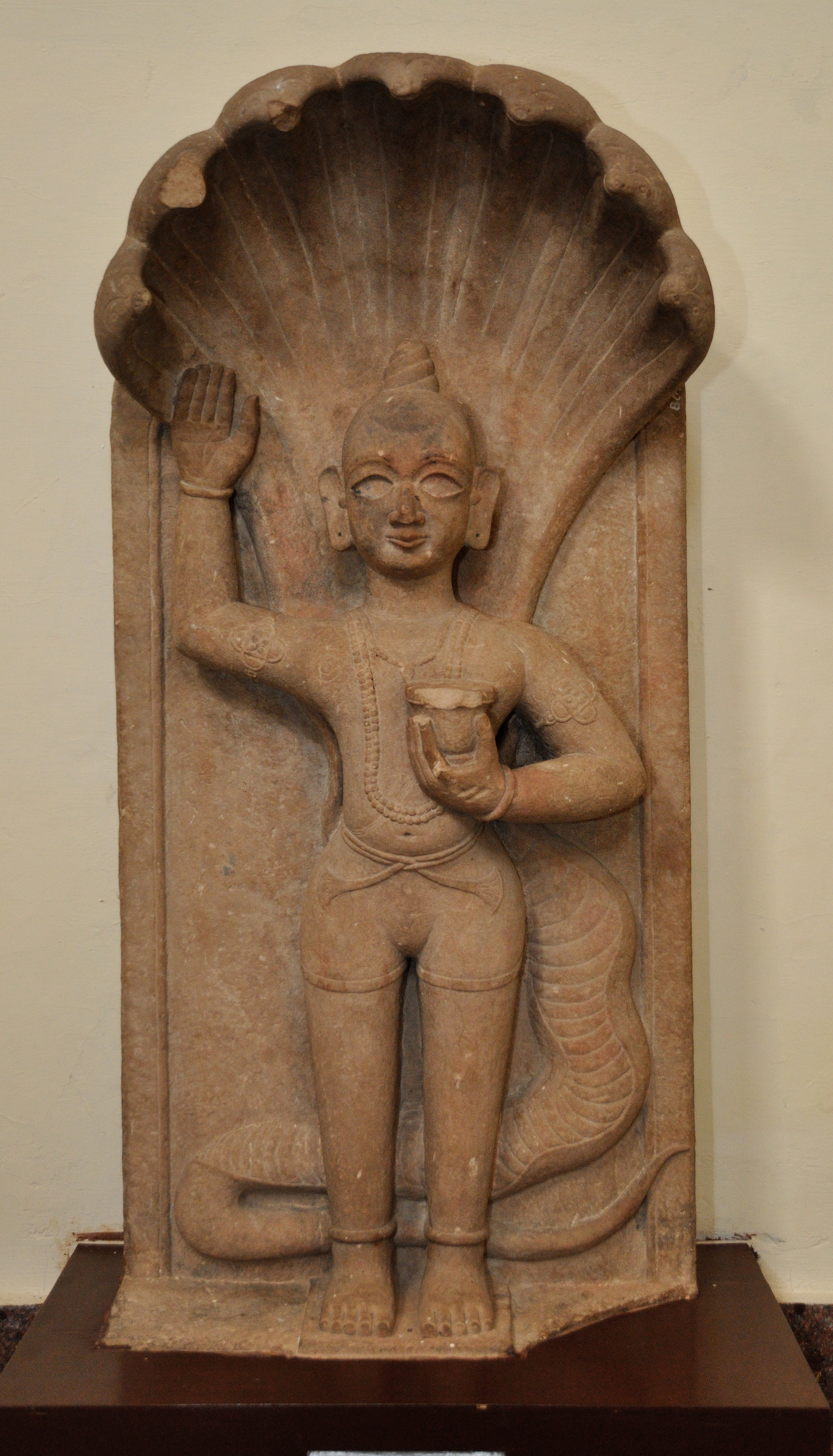
Balarama, circa 18th Century CE

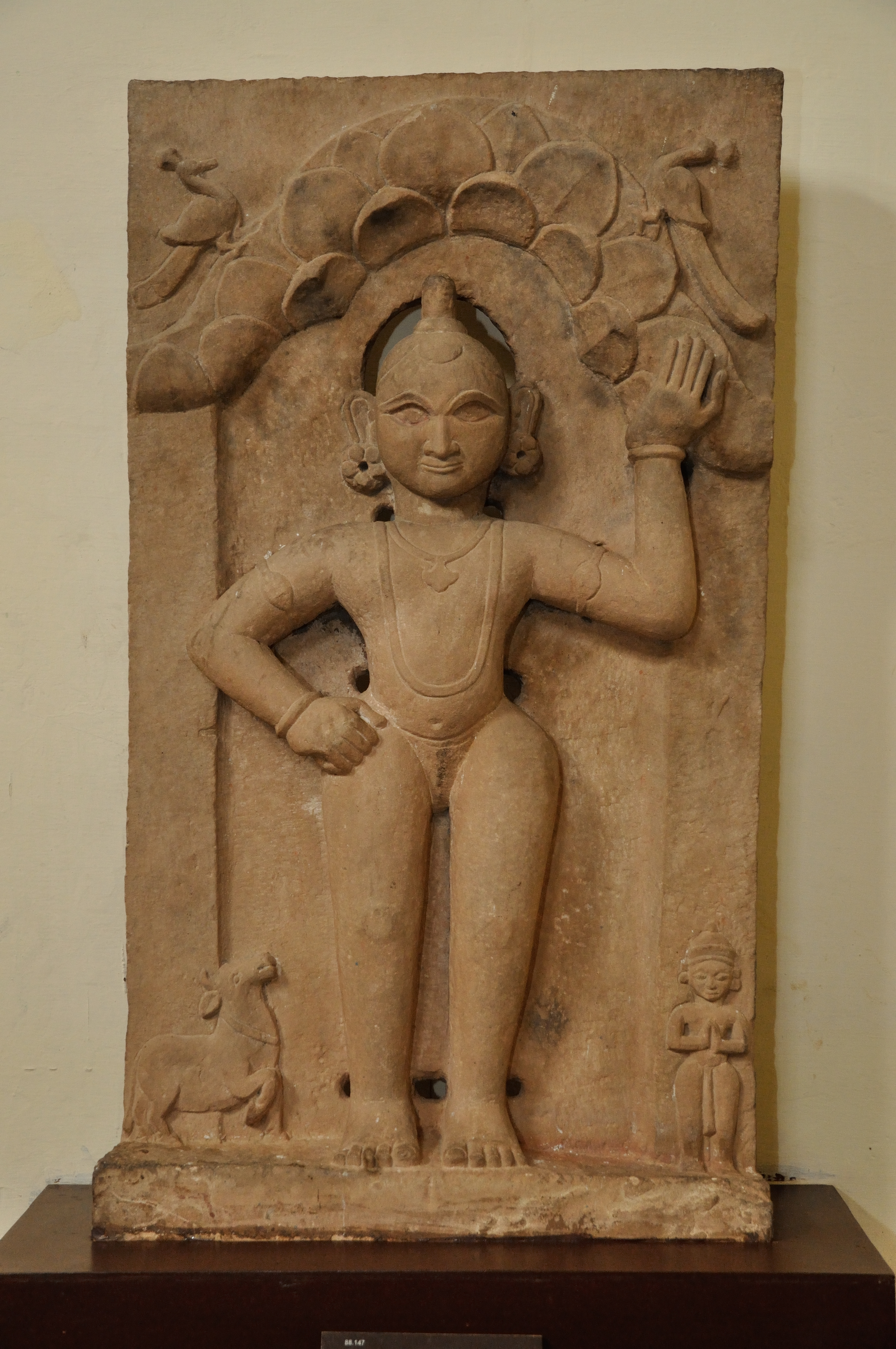
Krishna Lifting Govardhan Mound, circa 19th Century CE

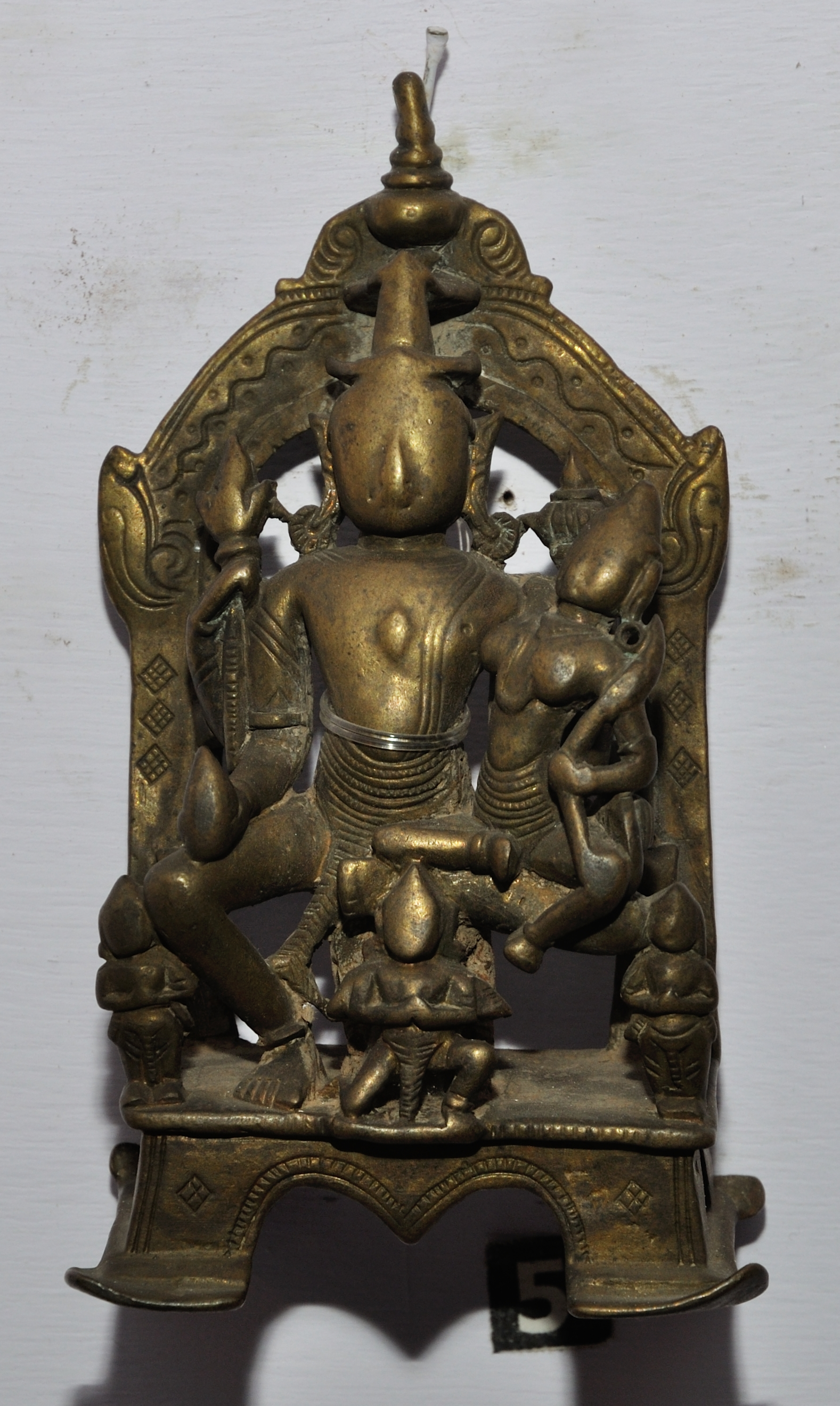
Lakshmi Narayan Seated on Garuda - Bronze - Circa 18th Century CE

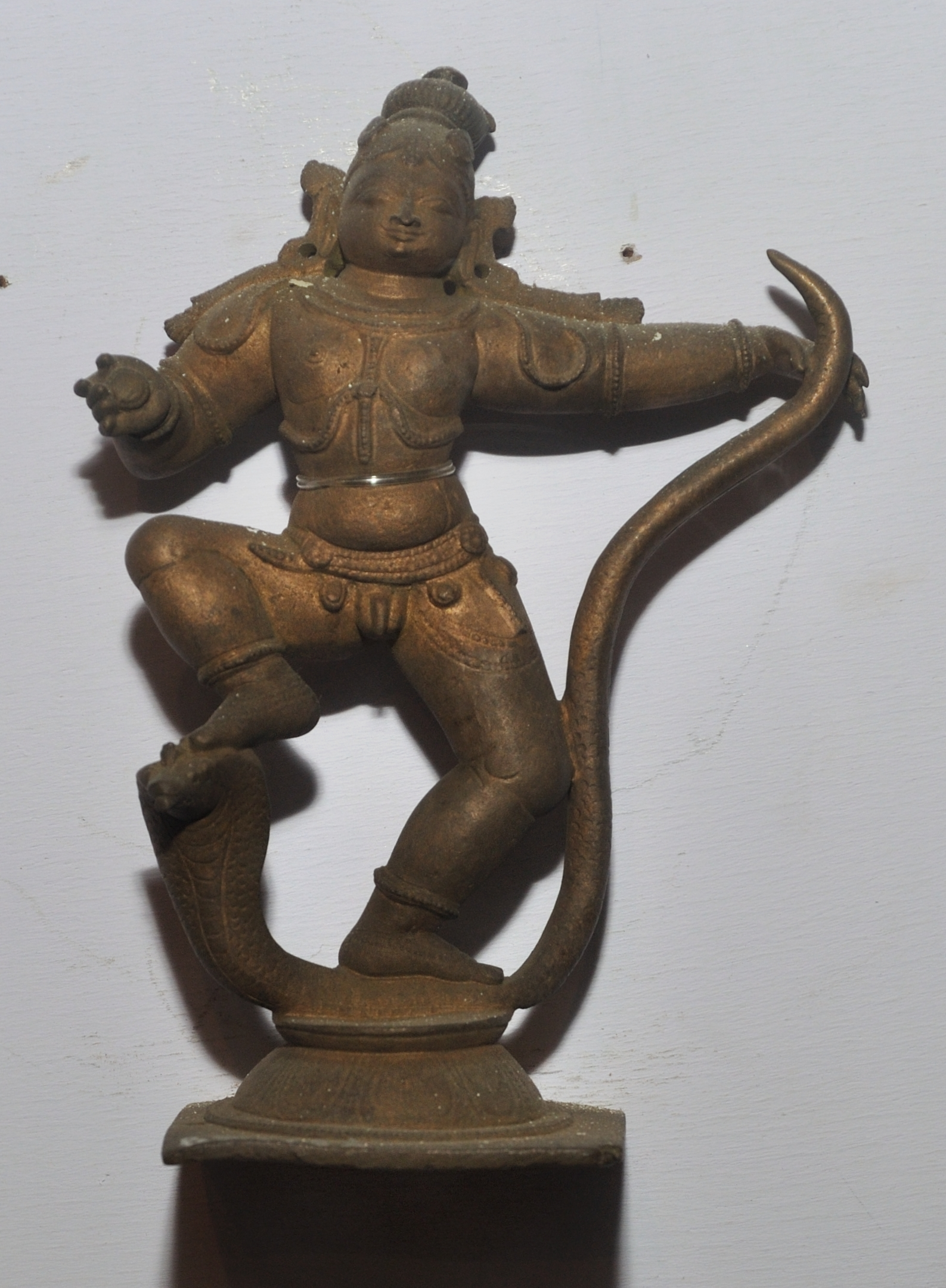
Lord Krishna Killing to Kaliyanaga Demon, Bronze, Modern Age

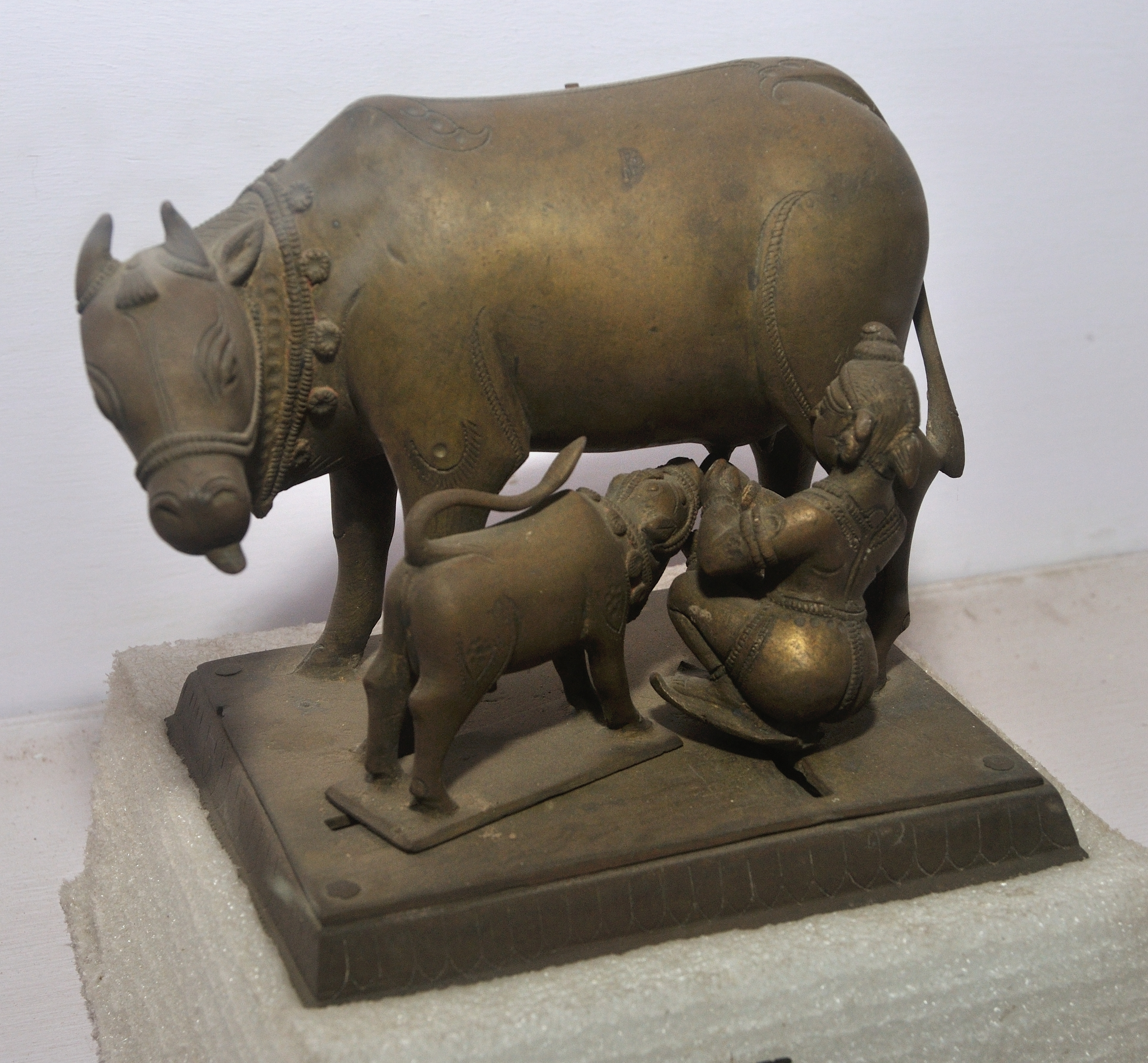
Man Milking Cow with Calf, Bronze, Modern Age

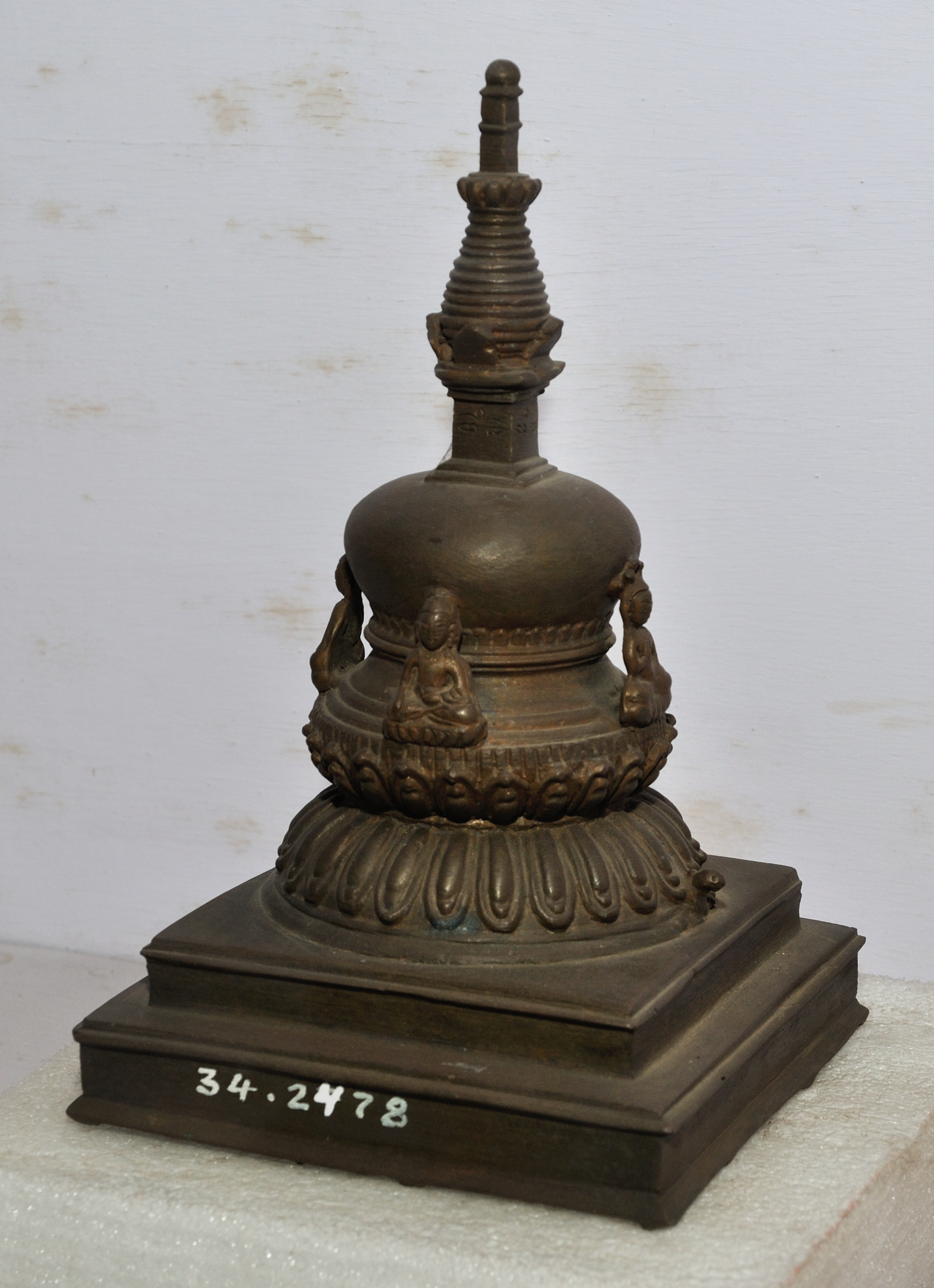
Stupa, Bronze, Modern Age

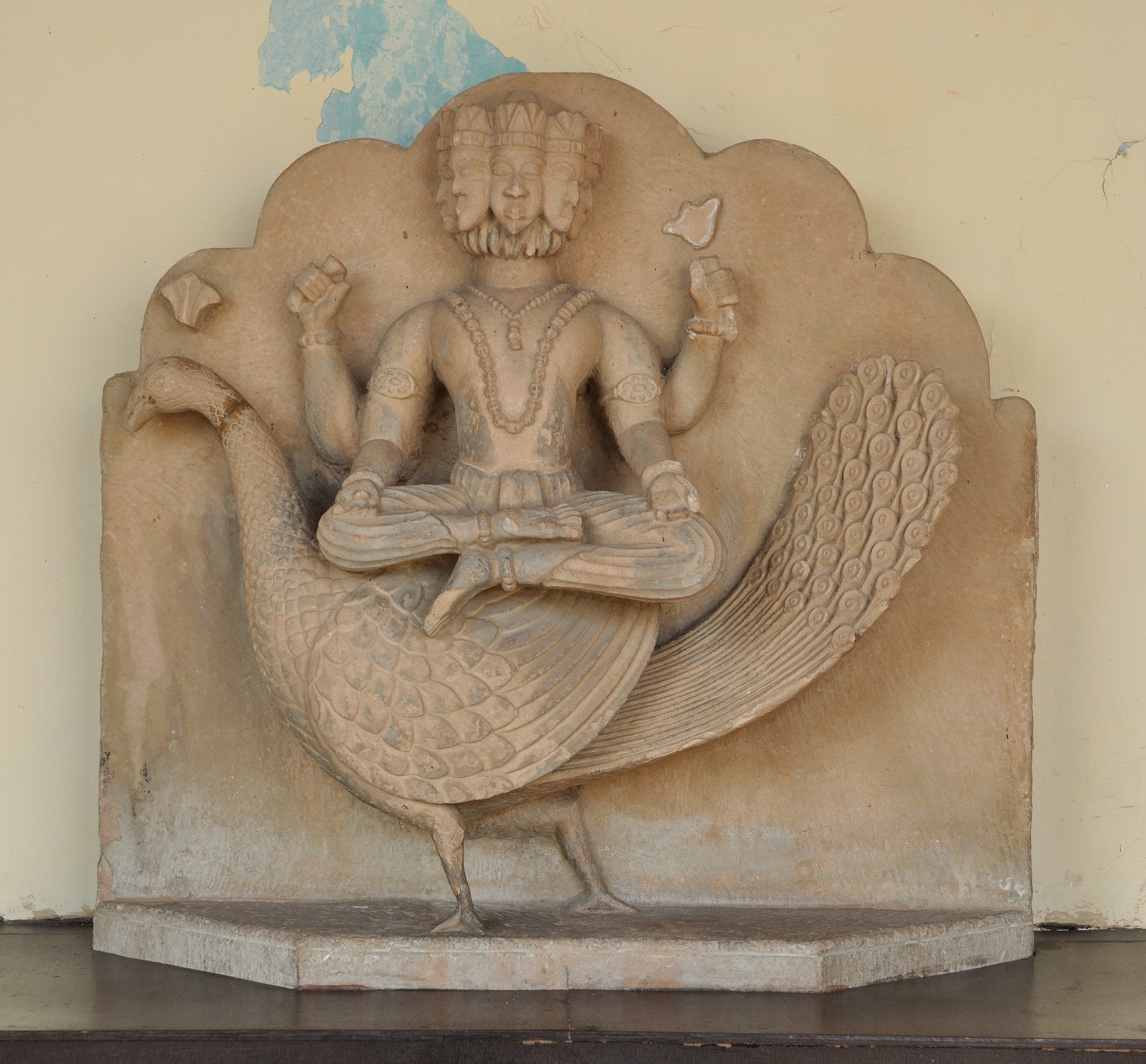
Kartikeya, Modern Period

== See also ==
- Indian art
- Architecture of India
- Indo-Greek art
- Gupta art
- Mauryan art
- Kushan art
- Hoysala architecture
- Vijayanagara architecture
- Greco-Buddhist art
- Chola art and architecture
- Pallava art and architecture
- Badami Chalukya architecture

== Sources ==
- Agrawal, Ashvini (1989). Rise and Fall of the Imperial Guptas. Motilal Banarsidass Publ. ISBN 978-81-208-0592-7.
- Paul, Pran Gopal; Paul, Debjani (1989). "Brahmanical Imagery in the Kuṣāṇa Art of Mathurā: Tradition and Innovations". East and West. 39 (1/4): 111–143. ISSN 0012-8376. JSTOR 29756891.
- Quintanilla, Sonya Rhie (2007). History of Early Stone Sculpture at Mathura: Ca. 150 BCE – 100 CE. BRILL. ISBN 9789004155374.
- Salomon, Richard (1998). Indian Epigraphy: A Guide to the Study of Inscriptions in Sanskrit, Prakrit, and the other Indo-Aryan Languages. Oxford University Press. ISBN 978-0-19-535666-3.
- Srinivasan, Doris (1997), Many Heads, Arms, and Eyes: Origin, Meaning, and Form of Multiplicity in Indian Art, BRILL, ISBN 9789004107588
- Media related to Art of Mathura at Wikimedia Commons
