= Indo-Greek art =

Art of the Indo-Greeks (c. 200 BCE)

Indo-Greek art
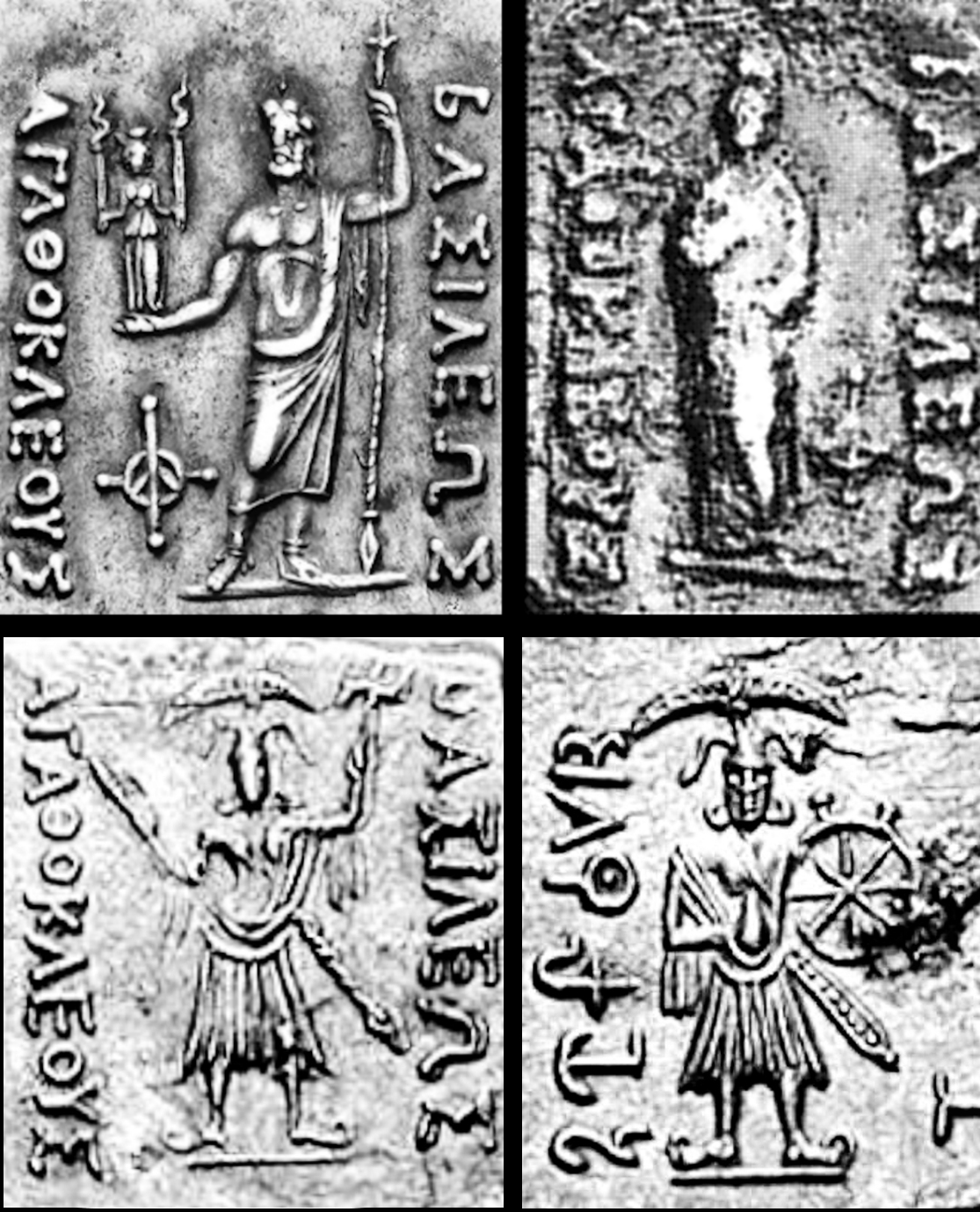
Greek and Indian deities on the coinage of Agathocles, circa 180 BCE. Besides the Greek god Zeus, the Indian deities have been variously identified as the Buddha, Vishnu, Shiva, Vasudeva or Balarama.

Indo-Greek art is the art of the Indo-Greeks, who reigned from circa 200 BCE in areas of Bactria and the Indian subcontinent. Initially, between 200 and 145 BCE, they remained in control of Bactria while occupying areas of Indian subcontinent, until Bactria was lost to invading nomads. After 145 BCE, Indo-Greek kings ruled exclusively in parts of ancient India, especially in Gandhara, in what is now present-day the northwestern Pakistan. The Indo-Greeks had a rich Hellenistic heritage and artistic proficiency as seen with the remains of the city of Ai-Khanoum, which was founded as a Greco-Bactrian city. In modern-day Pakistan, several Indo-Greeks cities are known such as Sirkap near Taxila, Barikot, and Sagala where some Indo-Greek artistic remains have been found, such as stone palettes.

Some Buddhist cultural objects related to the Indo-Greeks are known, such as the Shinkot casket. By far the most important Indo-Greek remains found are numerous coins of the Indo-Greek kings, considered as some of the most artistically brilliant of Antiquity. Most of the works of art of the Greco-Buddhist art of Gandhara are usually attributed to the direct successors of the Indo-Greeks in Ancient India in the 1st century CE, such as the nomadic Indo-Scythians, the Indo-Parthians and, in an already decadent state, the Kushans. Many Gandharan works of art cannot be dated exactly, leaving the exact chronology open to interpretation. With the realization that the Indo-Greeks ruled in India until at least 10-20 CE with the reign of Strato II in the Punjab, the possibility of a direct connection between the Indo-Greeks and Greco-Buddhist art has been reaffirmed recently.

== Early Indo-Bactrian period (200-145 BCE) ==
Main known Indo-Greek cities during the period 200-145 BCE

The first Indo-Greek kings, also sometimes called "Indo-Bactrian", from Demetrius I (200–190 BCE) to Eucratides (170–145 BCE) ruled simultaneously, the areas of Bactria and northwestern India, until they were completely expelled from Bactria and the eastern Bactrian capital city of Ai-Khanoum by invading nomads, probably the Yuezhi, or possibly the Sakas, circa 145 BCE. While Demetrius, the first Indo-Greek king, was extending his territory into India, still held Ai-Khanoum as one of his strongholds and continued to mint some of his coinage in the city. The last Greek coinage in Ai-Khanoum was by Eucratides. Because of their dual territorial possessions in Bactria and India, these kings, starting with Demetrius I, are variously described as Indo-Greek, Indo-Bactrian, or Greco-Bactrian. After losing Bactria around circa 145 BCE during the rule of Eucratides and Menander I, the Greeks were generally called as "Indo-Greeks" only.

The main known remains from this period are the ruins and artifacts of their city of Ai-Khanoum, a Greco-Bactrian city founded circa 280 BCE which continued to flourish during the first 55 years of the Indo-Greek period until its destruction by nomadic invaders in 145 BCE, and their coinage, which is often bilingual, combining Greek with the Indian Brahmi script or Kharoshthi. Apart from Ai-Khanoum, Indo-Greek ruins have been positively identified in few cities such as Barikot or Taxila, with generally much fewer known artistic remains.

=== Architecture in Bactria ===
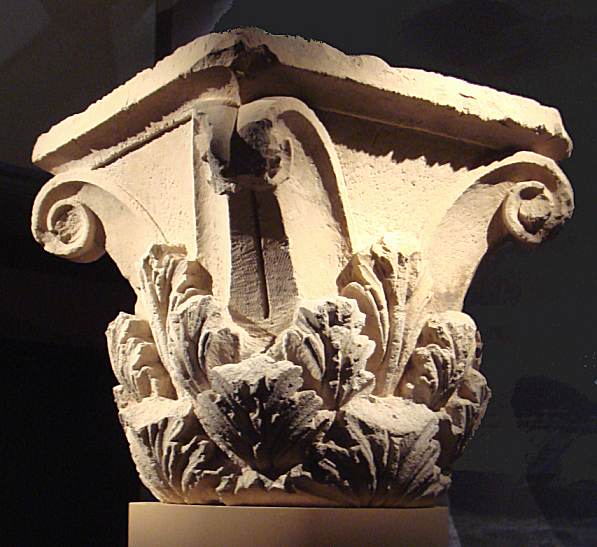
Corinthian capital, found at Ai-Khanoum in the citadel by the troops of Commander Massoud, 2nd century BC.

Numerous artefacts and structures were found, particularly in Ai-Khanoum, pointing to a high Hellenistic culture, combined with Eastern influences, starting from the 280-250 BCE period. Overall, Aï-Khanoum was an extremely important Greek city (1.5 sq kilometer), characteristic of the Seleucid Empire and then the Greco-Bactrian Kingdom, remaining one of the major cities at the time when the Greek kings started to occupy parts of India, from 200 to 145 BCE. It seems the city was destroyed, never to be rebuilt, about the time of the death of king Eucratides around 145 BC.

Archaeological missions unearthed various structures, some of them perfectly Hellenistic, some other integrating elements of Persian architecture, including a citadel, a Classical theater, a huge palace in Greco-Bactrian architecture, somehow reminiscent of formal Persian palatial architecture, a gymnasium (100 × 100m), one of the largest of Antiquity, various temples, a mosaic representing the Macedonian sun, acanthus leaves and various animals (crabs, dolphins etc...), numerous remains of Classical Corinthian columns. Many artifacts are dated to the 2nd century BCE, which corresponds to the early Indo-Greek period.

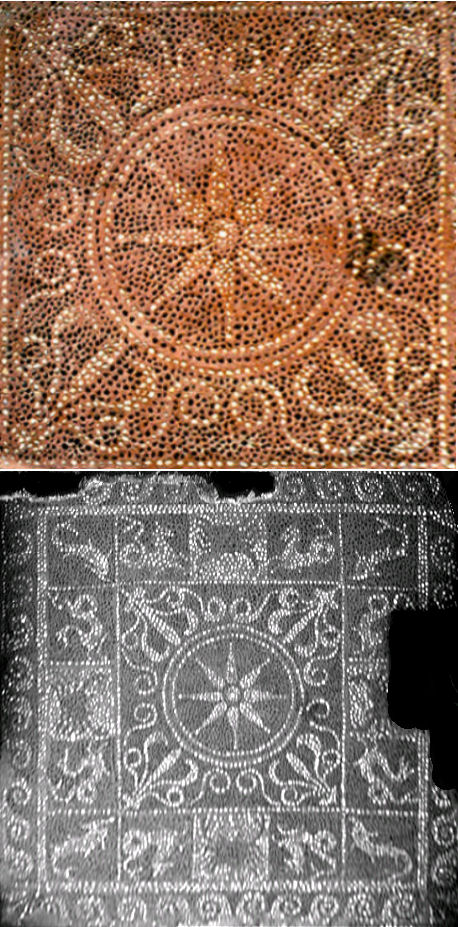
Ai- Khanoum mosaic (central detail in color).

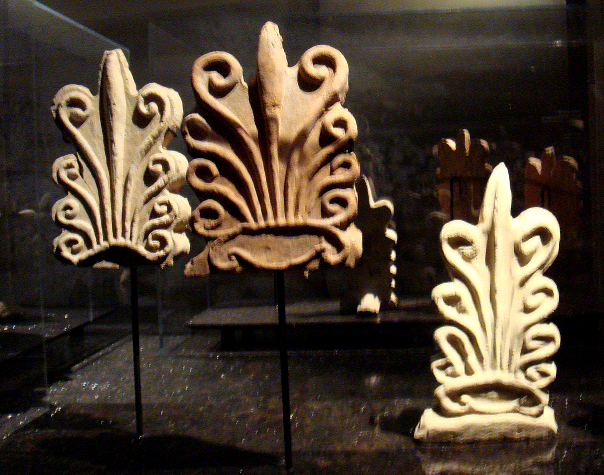
Architectural antefixae with Hellenistic "Flame palmette" design, Ai-Khanoum.

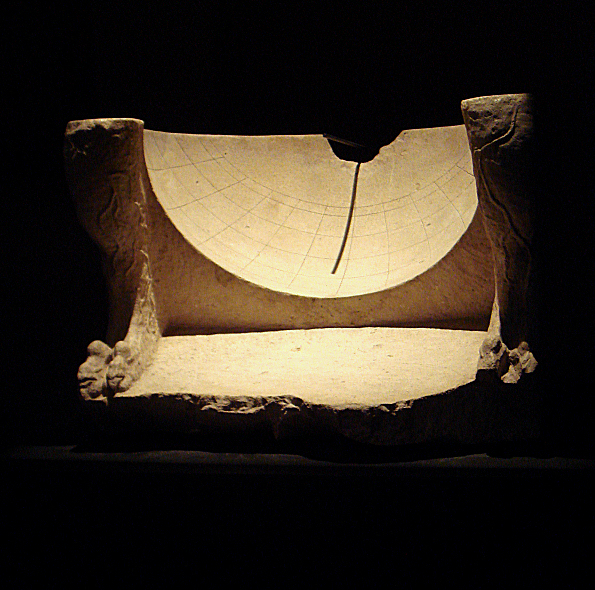
Sun dial within two sculpted lion feet.

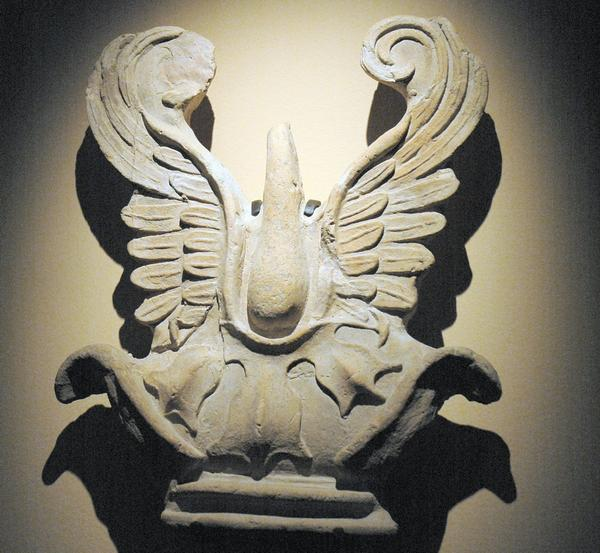
Winged antefix, a type only known from Ai-Khanoum.

=== Sculpture ===
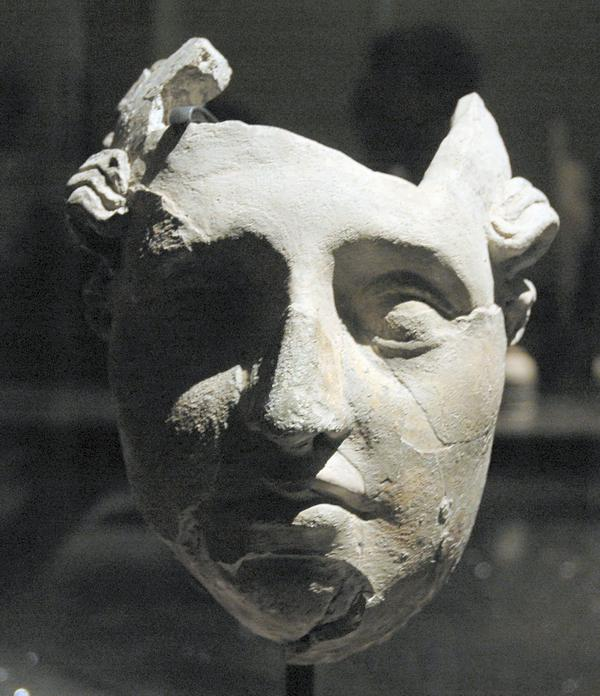
Stucco face found in the administrative palace. Ai-Khanoum, 2nd century BC

Various sculptural fragments were also found at Ai-Khanoum, in a rather conventional, classical style, rather impervious to the Hellenizing innovations occurring at the same time in the Mediterranean world. Of special notice, a huge foot fragment in excellent Hellenistic style was recovered, which is estimated to have belonged to a 5-6 meter tall statue (which had to be seated to fit within the height of the columns supporting the Temple). Since the sandal of the foot fragment bears the symbolic depiction of Zeus' thunderbolt, the statue is thought to have been a smaller version of the Statue of Zeus at Olympia.

Due to the lack of proper stones for sculptural work in the area of Ai-Khanoum, unbaked clay and stucco modeled on a wooden frame were often used, a technique which would become widespread in Central Asia and the East, especially in Buddhist art. In some cases, only the hands and feet would be made in marble.

In India, only a few Hellenistic sculptural remains have been found, mainly small items in the excavations of Sirkap.

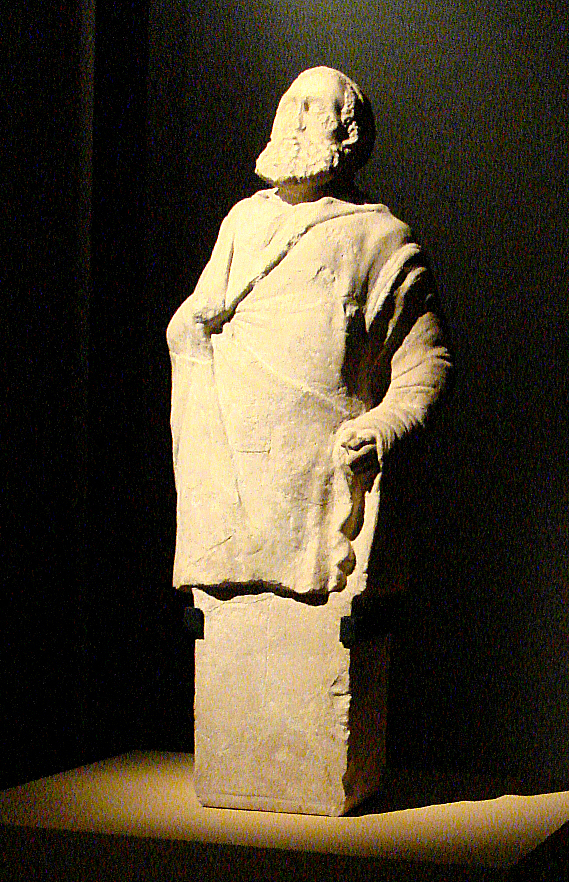
Sculpture of an old man. Ai-Khanoum, 2nd century BC.

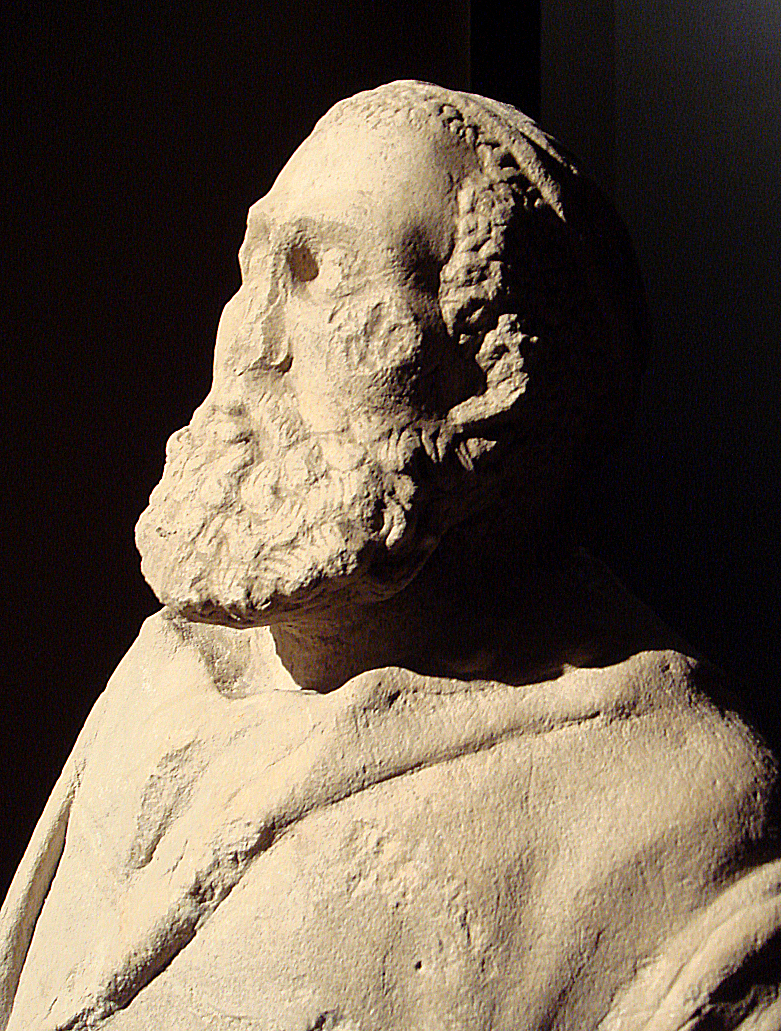
Close-up of the same statue.

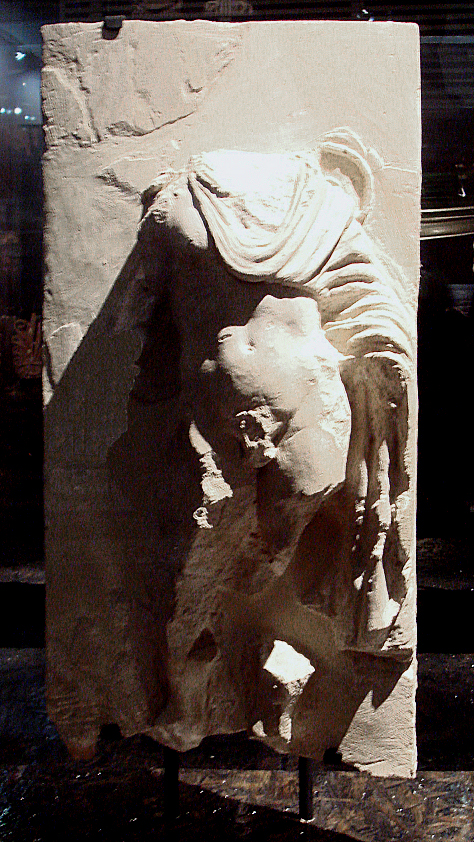
Frieze of a naked man wearing a chlamys. Ai-Khanoum, 2nd century BC.

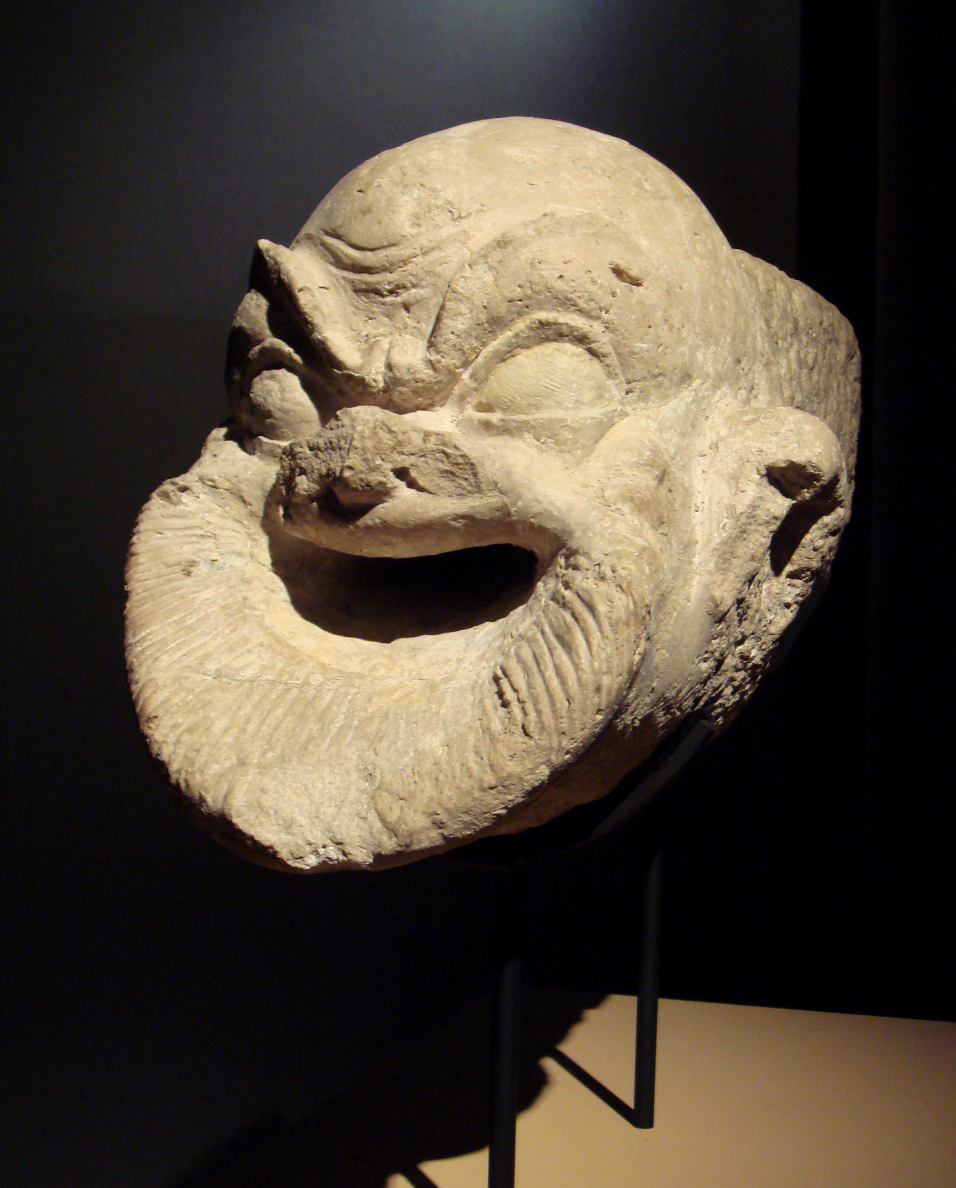
Hellenistic gargoyle. Ai-Khanoum, 2nd century BC.

=== Artefacts ===
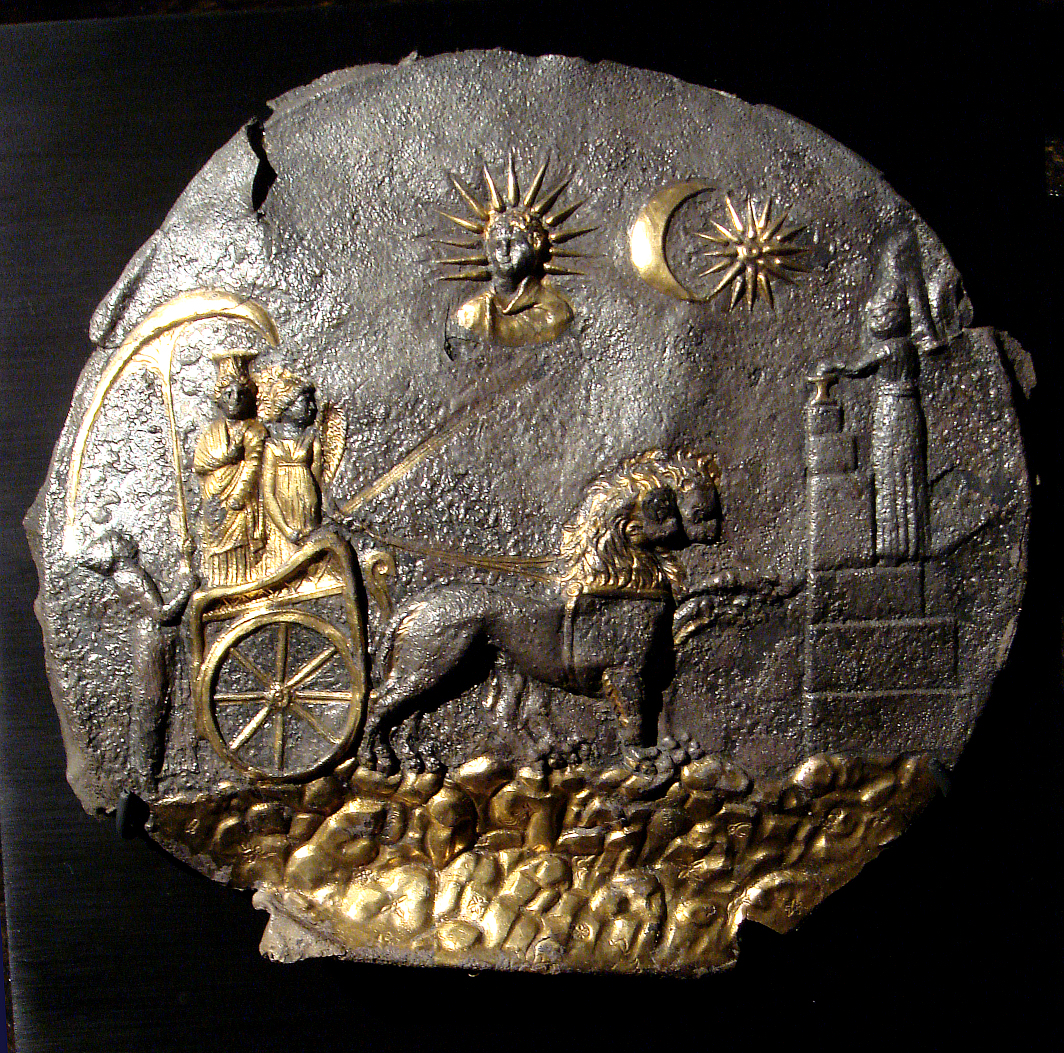
Plate depicting Cybele pulled by lions, a votive sacrifice and the Sun God. Ai-Khanoum, 2nd century BC.

A variety of artefacts of Hellenistic style, often with Persian influence, were also excavated at Ai-Khanoum, such as a round medallion plate describing the goddess Cybele on a chariot, in front of a fire altar, and under a depiction of Helios, a fully preserved bronze statue of Herakles, various golden serpentine arm jewellery and earrings, a toilet tray representing a seated Aphrodite, a mold representing a bearded and diademed middle-aged man. Various artefacts of daily life are also clearly Hellenistic: sundials, ink wells, tableware. An almost life-sized dark green glass phallus with a small owl on the back side and other treasures are said to have been discovered at Ai-Khanoum, possibly along with a stone with an inscription, which was not recovered. The artefacts have now been returned to the Kabul Museum after several years in Switzerland by Paul Bucherer-Dietschi, Director of the Swiss Afghanistan Institute.

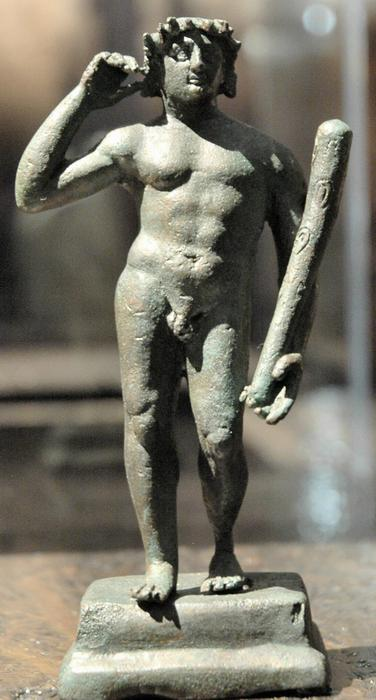
Bronze Herakles statuette. Ai-Khanoum. 2nd century BC.

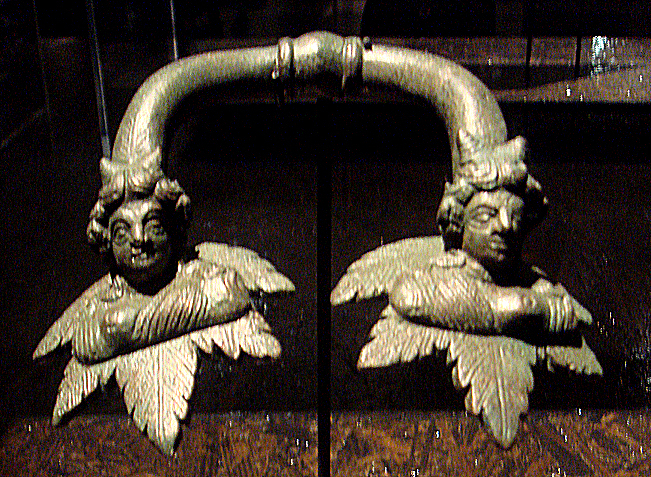
Bracelet with horned female busts. Ai-Khanoum, 2nd century BC.

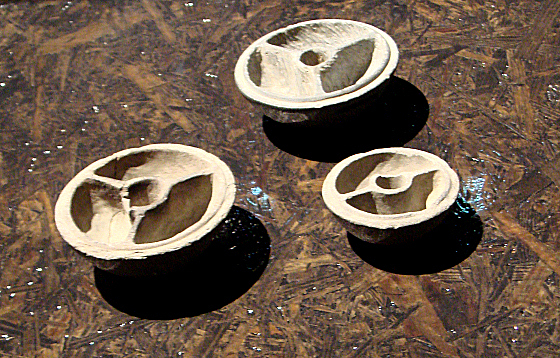
Stone recipients from Ai-Khanoum. 3rd-2nd century BC.

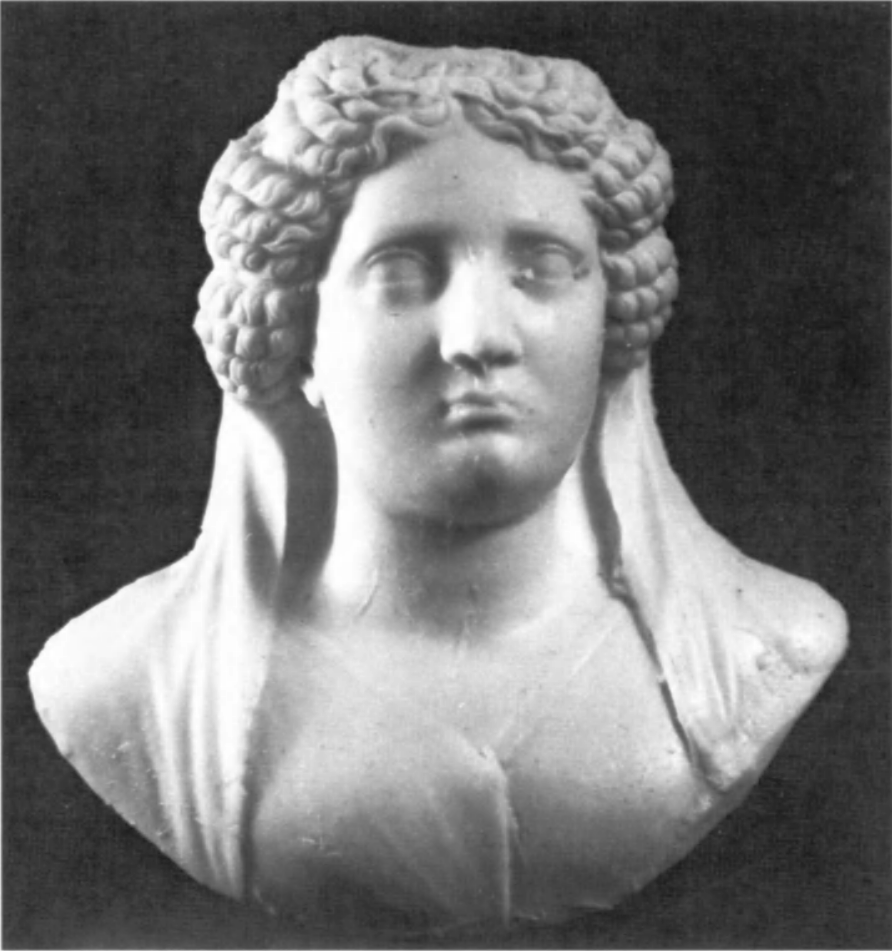
Imprint from a mold found in Ai-Khanoum. 3rd-2nd century BC.

=== First Indo-Greek coinage ===
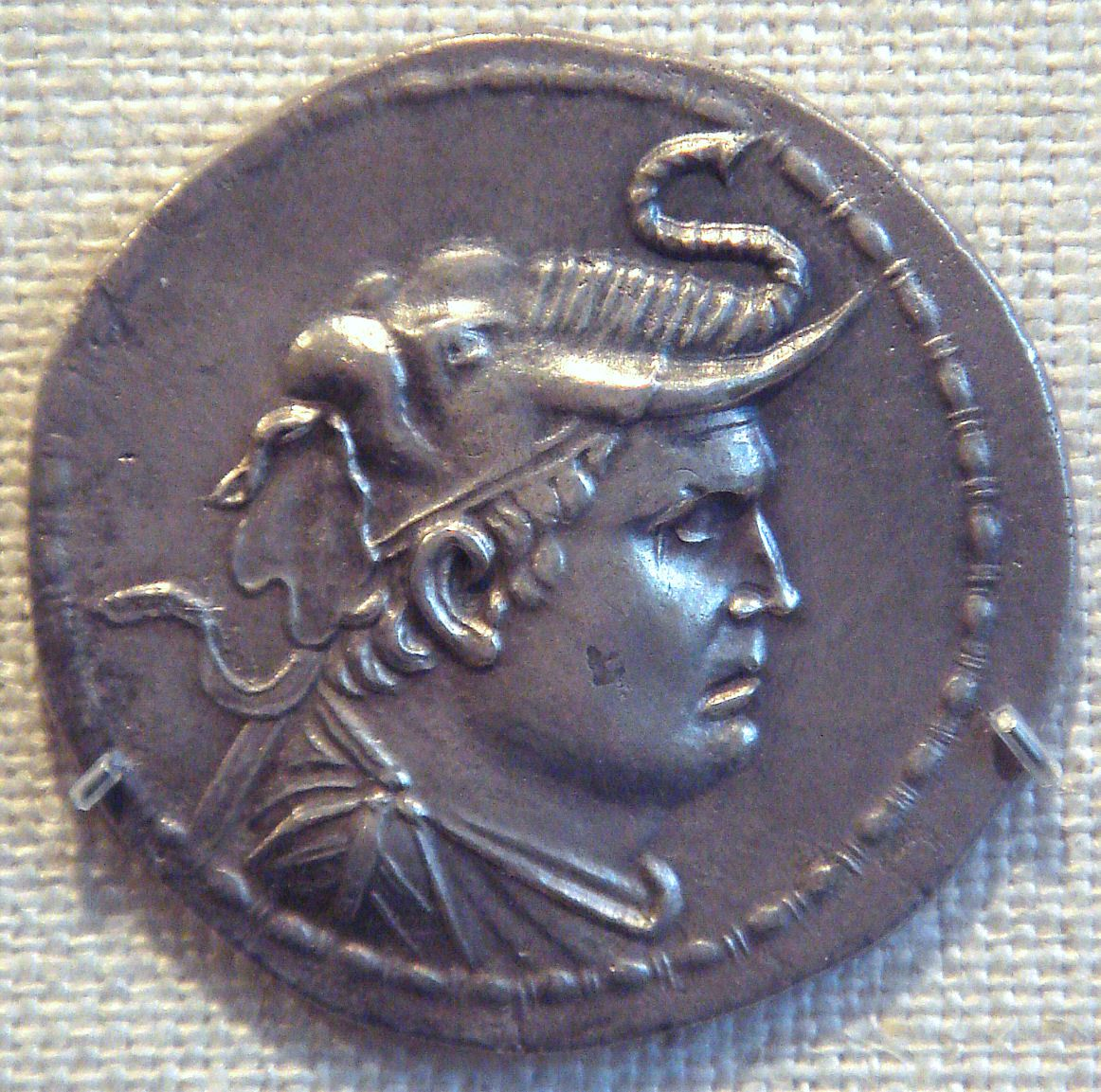
Silver coin of Demetrius I of Bactria (reigned c. 200–180 BC) in the Greco-Bactrian standard, wearing an elephant scalp, symbol of his conquests of areas in the northwest of the Indian subcontinent.

Demetrius I, the son of Euthydemus is generally considered as the Greco-Bactrian king who first launched the Greek expansion into ancient India circa 190-180 BCE, and is therefore the founder of the Indo-Greek realm and the first recognized Indo-Greek king. The first Indo-Greek kings, having dominions in Bactria as well as India, continued to strike coins in standard Greco-Bactrian style, but conjointly started to strike coins on the Indian standard having bilingual Indian-Greek legends.

After the death of Demetrius, the Bactrian kings Pantaleon and Agathocles struck the first bilingual coins with Indian inscriptions found as far east as Taxila, so in their time (c. 185–170 BC) the Bactrian kingdom seems to have included Gandhara. These first bilingual coins used the Brahmi script, whereas later kings would generally use Kharoshthi. They also went as far as incorporating Indian deities, variously interpreted as Hindu deities or the Buddha. They also included various Indian devices (lion, elephant, zebu bull) and symbols, some of them Buddhist such as the tree-in-railing. These symbols can also be seen in the Post-Mauryan coinage of Gandhara.

The Hinduist coinage of Agathocles is few but spectacular. Six Indian-standard silver drachmas were discovered at Ai-Khanoum in 1970, which depict Hindu deities. These are early Avatars of Vishnu: Balarama-Sankarshana with attributes consisting of the Gada mace and the plow, and Vasudeva-Krishna with the Vishnu attributes of the Shankha (a pear-shaped case or conch) and the Sudarshana Chakra wheel. These first attempts at incorporating Indian culture were only partly preserved by later kings: they all continued to struck bilingual coins, sometimes in addition to Attic coinage, but Greek deities remained prevalent. Indian animals however, such as the elephant, the bull or the lion, possibly with religious overtones, were used extensively in their Indian-standard square coinage. Buddhist wheels (Dharmachakras) still appear in the coinage of Menander I and Menander II.

In Ai-Khanoum, numerous coins were found, down to Eucratides, but none of them later. Ai-Khanoum also yielded unique coins of Agathocles, consisting of six Indian-standard silver drachms depicting Hindu deities. These are the first known representations of Vedic deities on coins, and they display early Avatars of Vishnu: Balarama-Samkarshana and Vasudeva-Krishna, and are thought to correspond to the first attempts at creating an Indian-standard coinage as they invaded northern India.

Bactrian and Indian coinage of some early Indo-Greek kings (200-145 BCE)
Territory/Ruler	Agathocles (190-180 BCE)	Pantaleon (190-180 BCE)	Apollodotus I (circa 180 BCE)	Eucratides (171-145 BCE)
Bactria	Bactrian coinage of Agathocles (190-180 BCE).	Bactrian coinage in the name of Pantaleon (190-180 BCE)	Bactrian coinage of Apollodotus I (circa 180 BCE).	Bactrian coinage of Eucratides (171-145 BCE).
India	Coin of Agathocles (190-180 BCE) with Hindu deities, and Greek and Brahmi legend, found in Ai-Khanoum.	Pantaleon (190-180 BCE) coin with dancing woman (Lakshmi?) and lion. Greek and Brahmi legend.	Apollodotus I (circa 180 BCE), early Attic bilingual drachm, with Greek and Indian Kharoshthi legend.	Coin of the Eucratides (171-145 BCE), with Greek and Kharoshthi legends.

==== Artifacts in Bactria ====
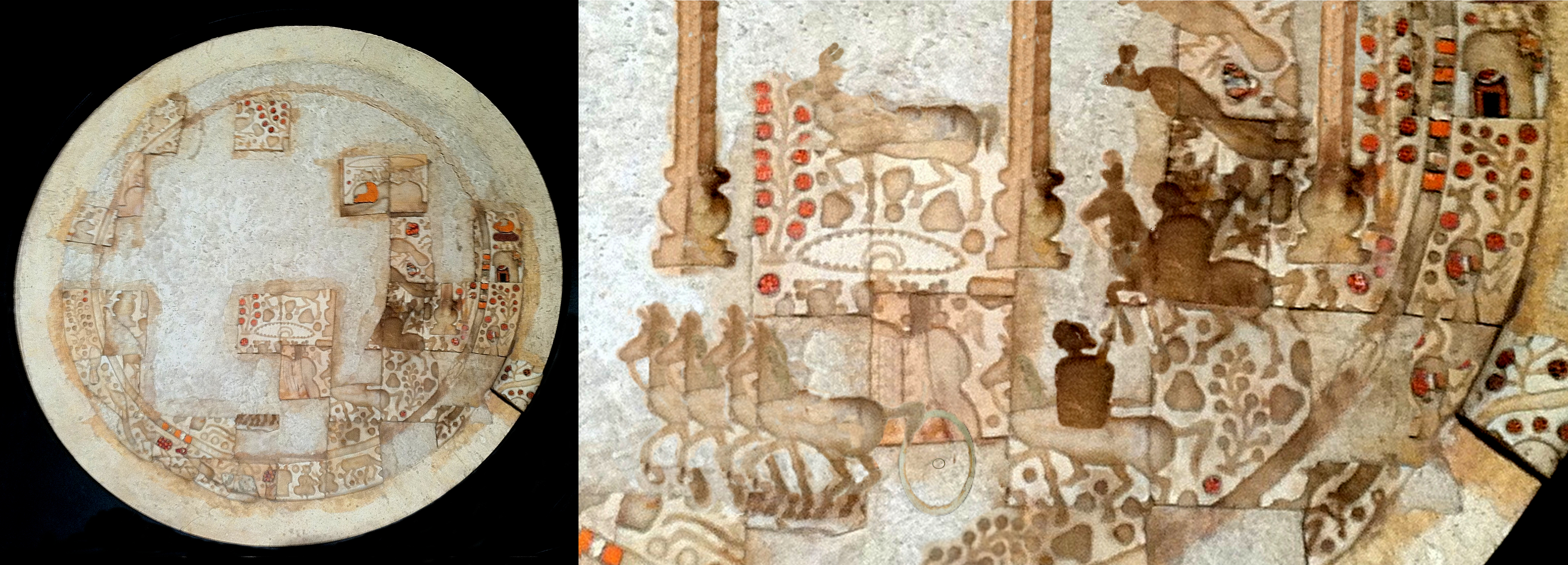
The plate found in Ai-Khanoum, thought to represent the myth of Shakuntala (with reconstitution).

Ancient Indian artifacts were also found in the treasure room of the city, probably brought back by Eucratides from his Indian campaigns, which show a level of artistic interaction between Indian and the Greeks at that time. A narrative plate made of shell inlaid with various materials and colors, thought to represent the Indian myth of Shakuntala was recovered. Also, numerous Indian punch-marked coins were found, about 677 of them in the Palace area of Ai-Khanoum alone, suggesting intense exchanges between Bactria and India.

==== Greek cities in the subcontinent ====
The first Indo-Greek ruler Demetrius I is said to have built the city of Sirkap, in modern-day Pakistan. The site of Sirkap was built according to a "Hippodamian" grid-plan characteristic of Greek cities. It is organized around one main avenue and fifteen perpendicular streets, covering a surface of around 1,200 by 400 meters (3,900 ft × 1,300 ft), with a surrounding wall 5–7 meters (16–23 ft) wide and 4.8 kilometers (3.0 mi) long. The ruins are Greek in character, similar to those of Olynthus in Macedonia. Numerous Hellenistic artifacts have been found, in particular coins of Greco-Bactrian kings and stone palettes representing Greek mythological scenes. Some of them are purely Hellenistic, others indicate an evolution of the Greco-Bactrian styles found at Ai-Khanoum towards more Indianized styles. For example, accessories such as Indian ankle bracelets can be found on some representations of Greek mythological figures such as Artemis.

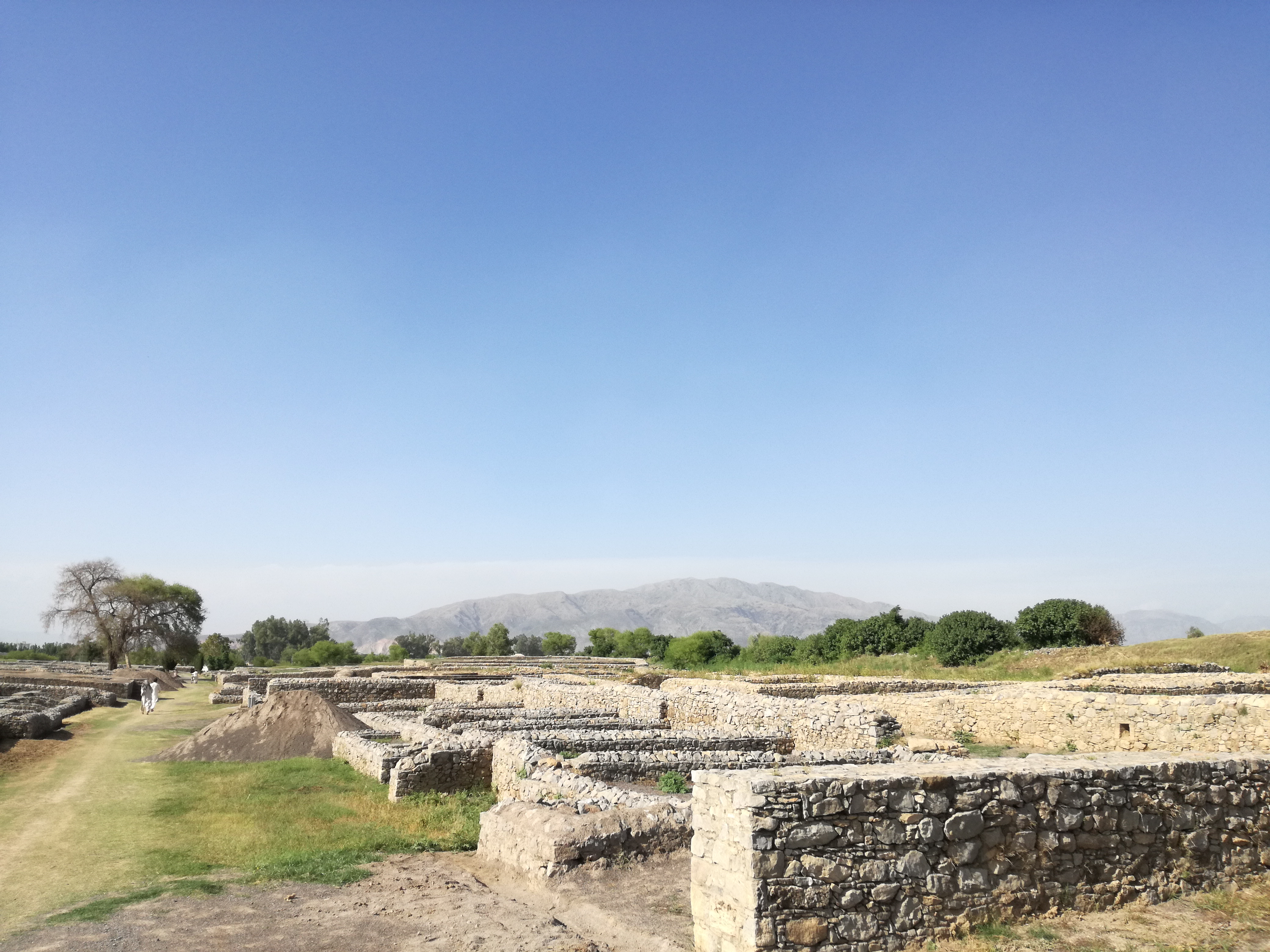
Some remains at Sirkap.

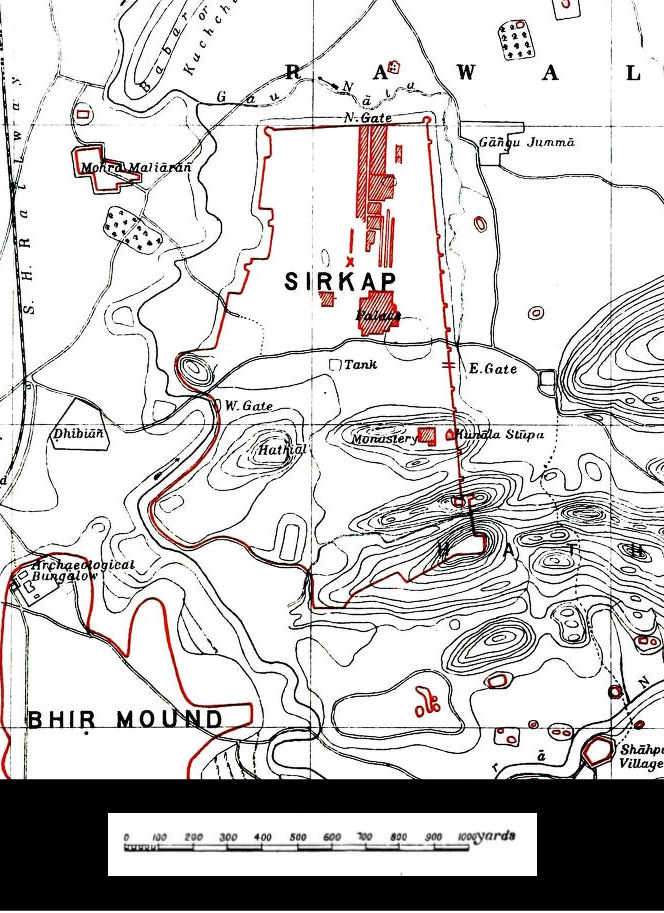
Map of Sirkap excavations.

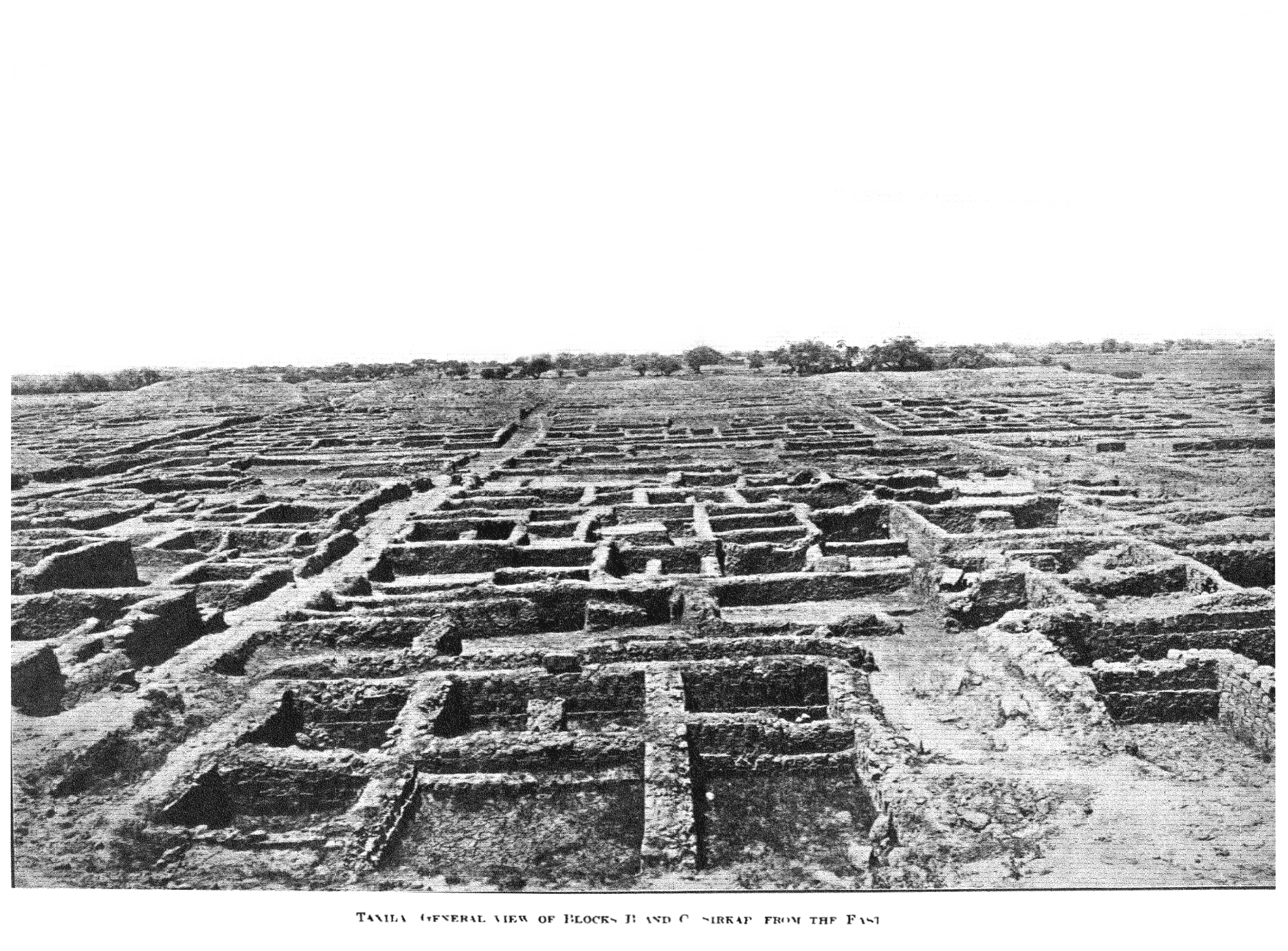
Sirkap at time of excavations.

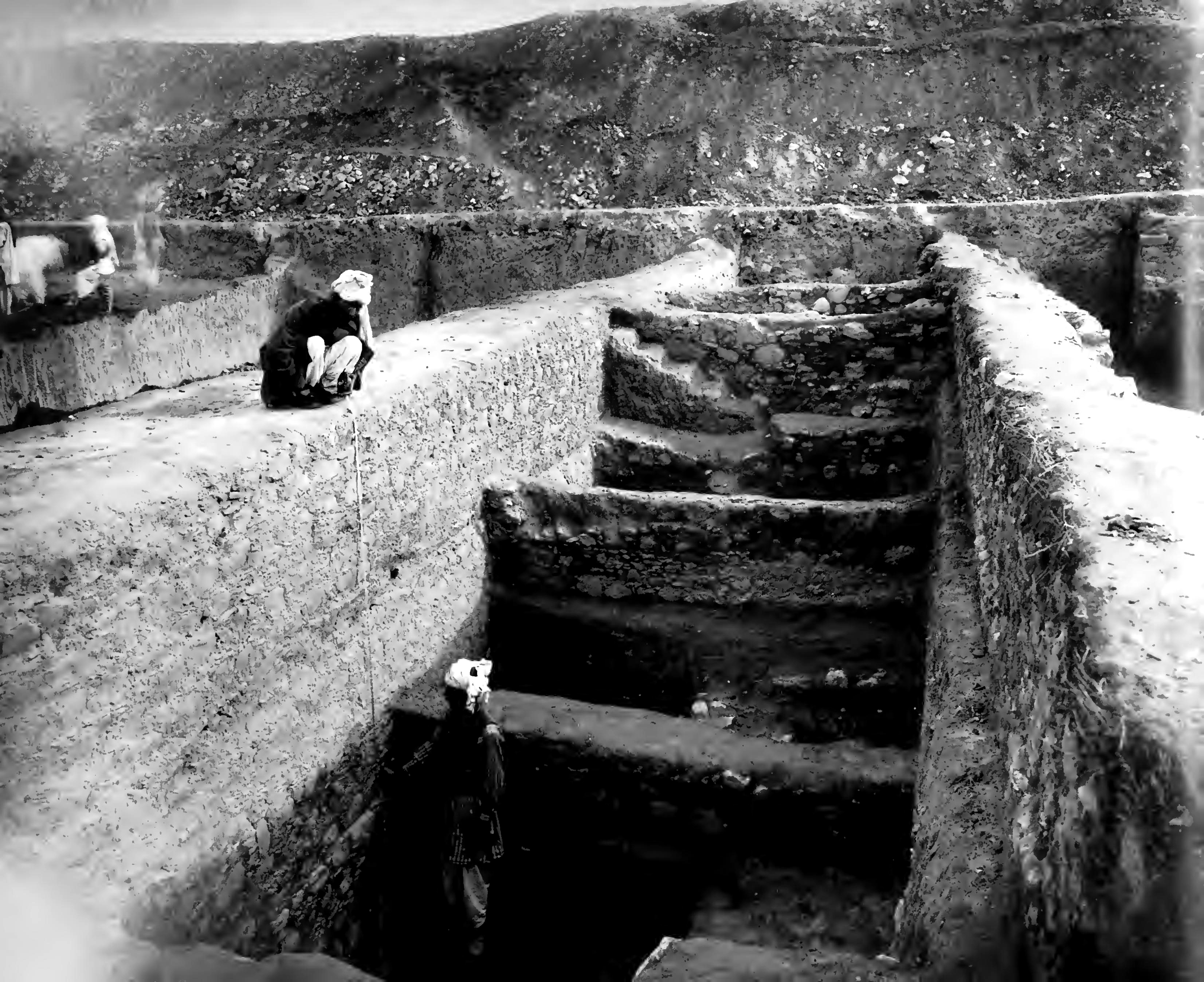
Excavations at Sirkap.

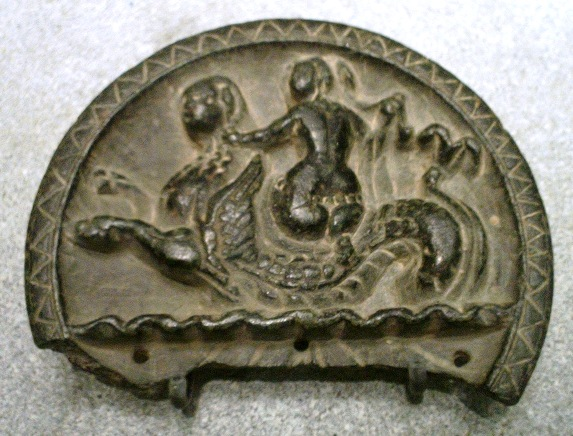
A Nereid riding a Ketos sea-monster, stone palette, Sirkap, 2nd century BC.

== Main Indian period (145 BCE-20 CE) ==
Main known Indo-Greek cities after 145 BCE

The main Indian period of the Indo-Greeks starts with the reign of Menander (from c. 165/155 BC) who has been described as the greatest of the Indo-Greek Kings.

The remains of the Greeks in South Asia essentially revolve around city ruins, stone palettes, a few Buddhist artefacts, and their abundant coinage.

=== Coinage ===
The Indo-Greek kings continued the tradition of minting bilingual coinage in India. Paradoxically, they were not as bold as earlier kings such as Agathocles or Pantaleon is showing Indian divinities. They all continued to struck bilingual coins, sometimes in addition to Attic coinage, but Greek deities remained prevalent. Indian animals however, such as the elephant, the bull or the lion, possibly with religious overtones, were used extensively in their Indian-standard square coinage. Buddhist wheels (Dharmachakras) appear in the coinage of Menander I and Menander II.

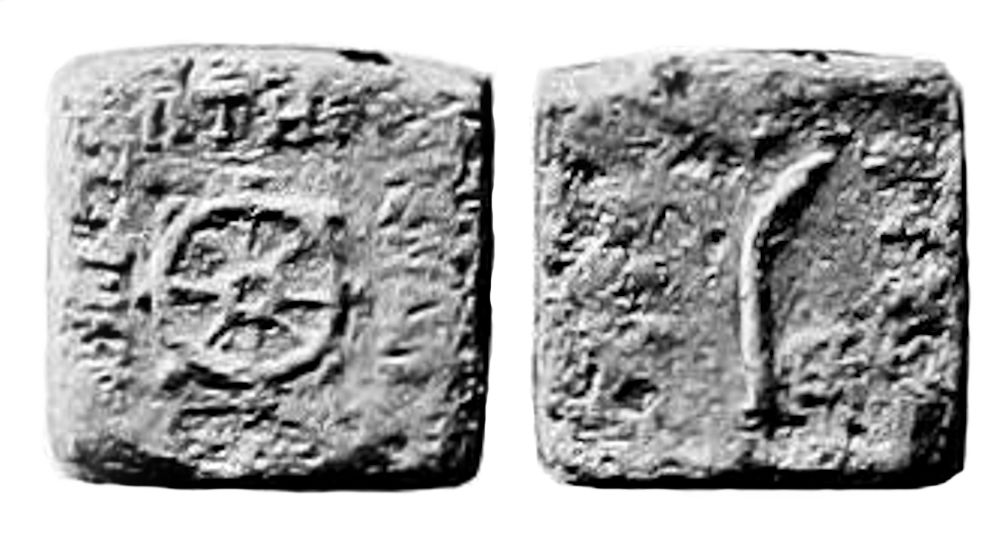
Famous Indian-standard coinage of Menander I with wheel design.

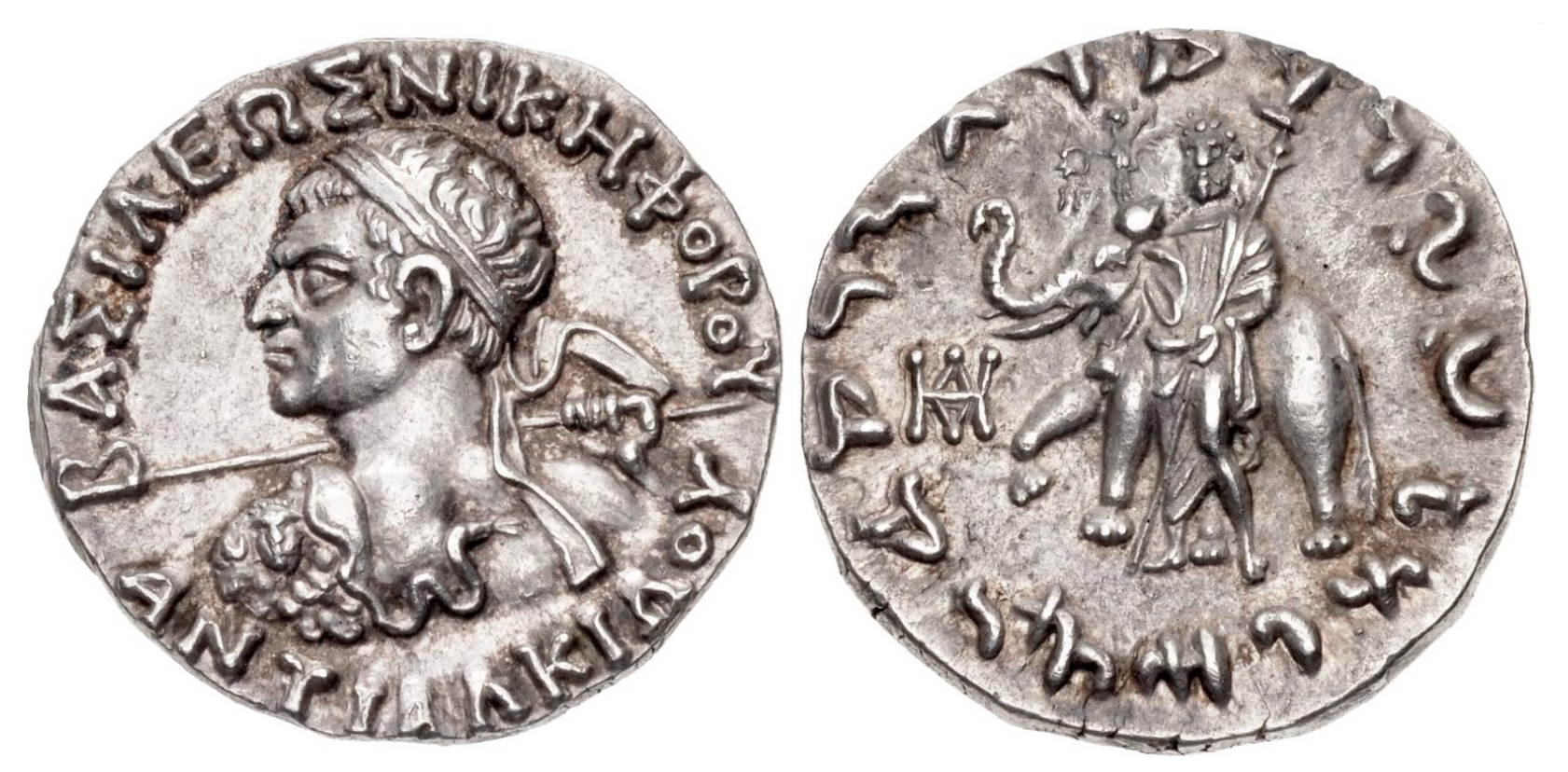
Coin of Antialcidas (105–95 BC), with elephant accompanying Zeus

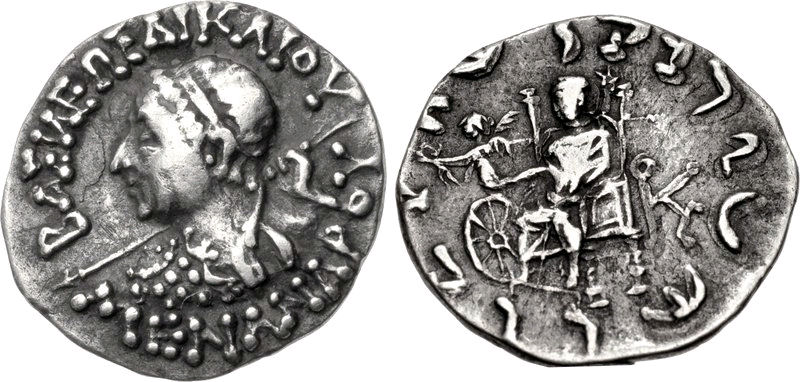
Coin of Menander II (90–85 BCE), with seated Zeus and Nike on his arm, extending a victory wreath over a wheel symbol

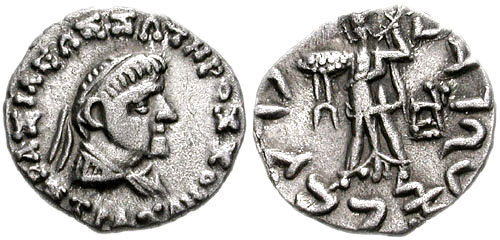
Coin of Strato II (25 BCE-10 CE), one of the last Indo-Greek kings.

=== Architecture ===
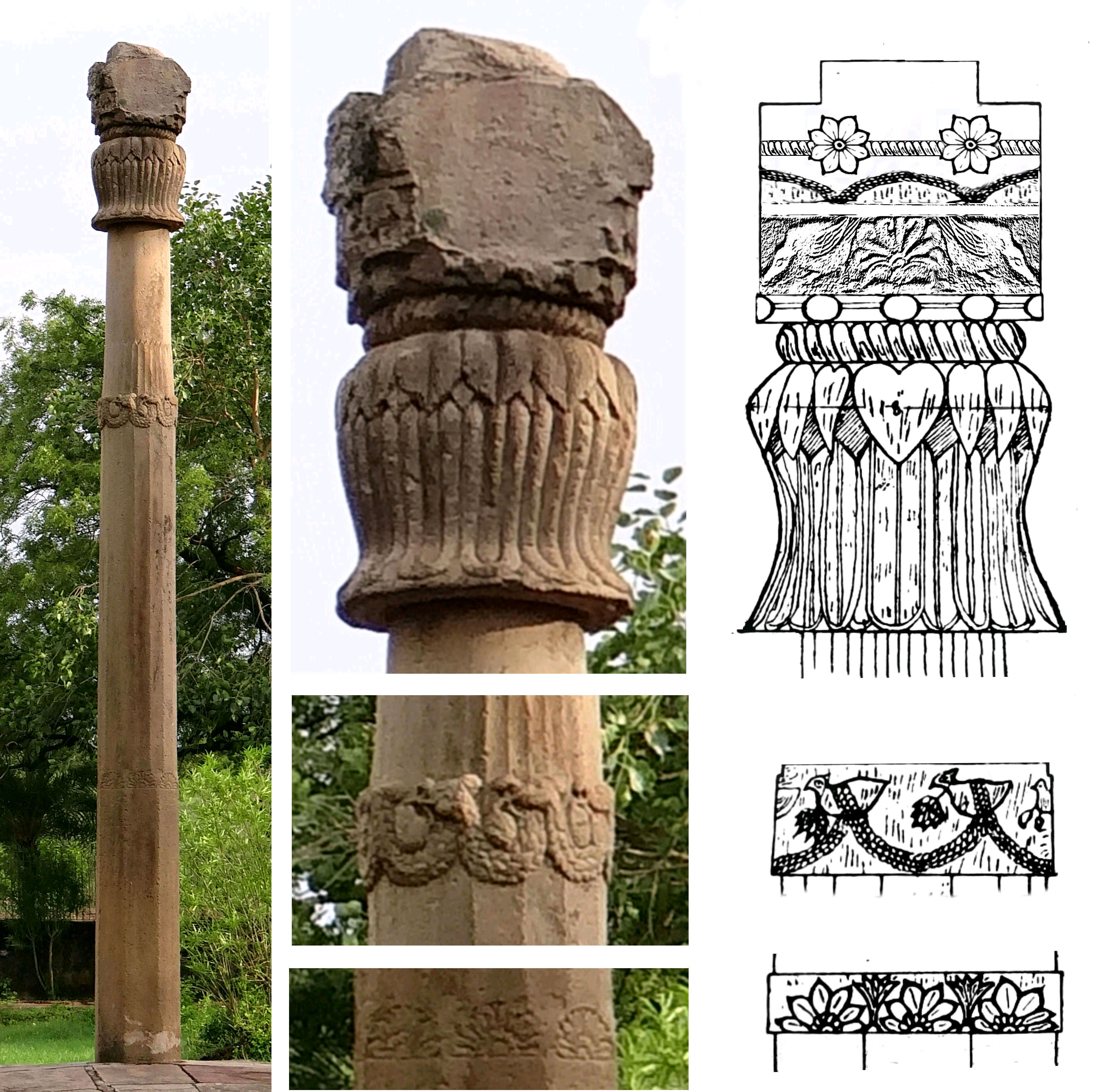
The Heliodorus pillar, erected circa 115 BCE by Indo-Greek ambassador Heliodorus, is the first known inscription related to Vaishnavism in India. Heliodorus was one of the earliest recorded Indo-Greek converts to Hinduism.

Besides the amin city of Sirkap, founded by Demetrius I, an expeditions in the 1980s and 90s discovered an Indo-Greek town in Barikot from around the time of King Menander I in the 2nd century BCE. The 2nd century BCE town covered, at its peak, an area of about 10 ha (25 acres) including the acropolis, or about 7 ha (17 acres) without. It was surrounded by a defensive wall about 2.7 meters thick with massive rectangular bastions and a moat, and was structurally similar to other Hellenistic fortified cities such as Ai-Khanoum or Sirkap. Indo-Greek coins were found, especially in the layers associated with the wall's construction, as well as potsherds with Greek letters.

The Indo-Greeks are also known for their involvement in the construction of a few architectural elements. In 115 BC, that the embassy of Heliodorus, from king Antialkidas to the court of the Shunga king Bhagabhadra in Vidisha, is recorded. In the Sunga capital, Heliodorus established the Heliodorus pillar in a dedication to Vāsudeva. This would indicate that relations between the Indo-Greeks and the Sungas had improved by that time, that people traveled between the two realms, and also that the Indo-Greeks readily followed Indian religions.

A coin of Menander I was found in the second oldest stratum (GSt 2) of the Butkara stupa suggesting a period of additional constructions during the reign of Menander. It is thought that Menander was the builder of the second oldest layer of the Butkara stupa, following its initial construction during the Maurya Empire. These elements tend to indicate the importance of Buddhism within Greek communities in northwestern India, and the prominent role Greek Buddhist monks played in them, probably under the sponsorship of Menander.

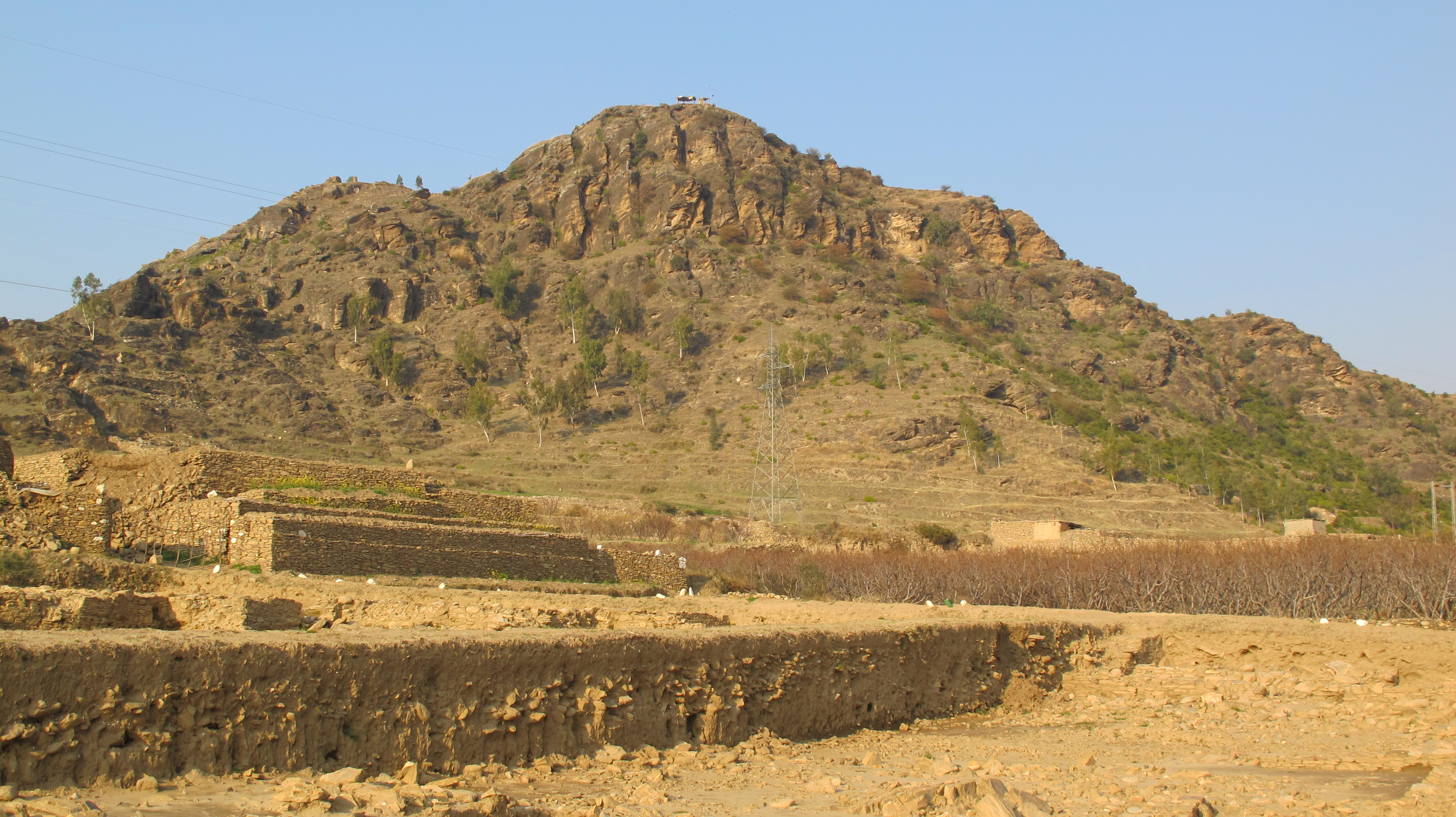
Ruins of the city of Barikot

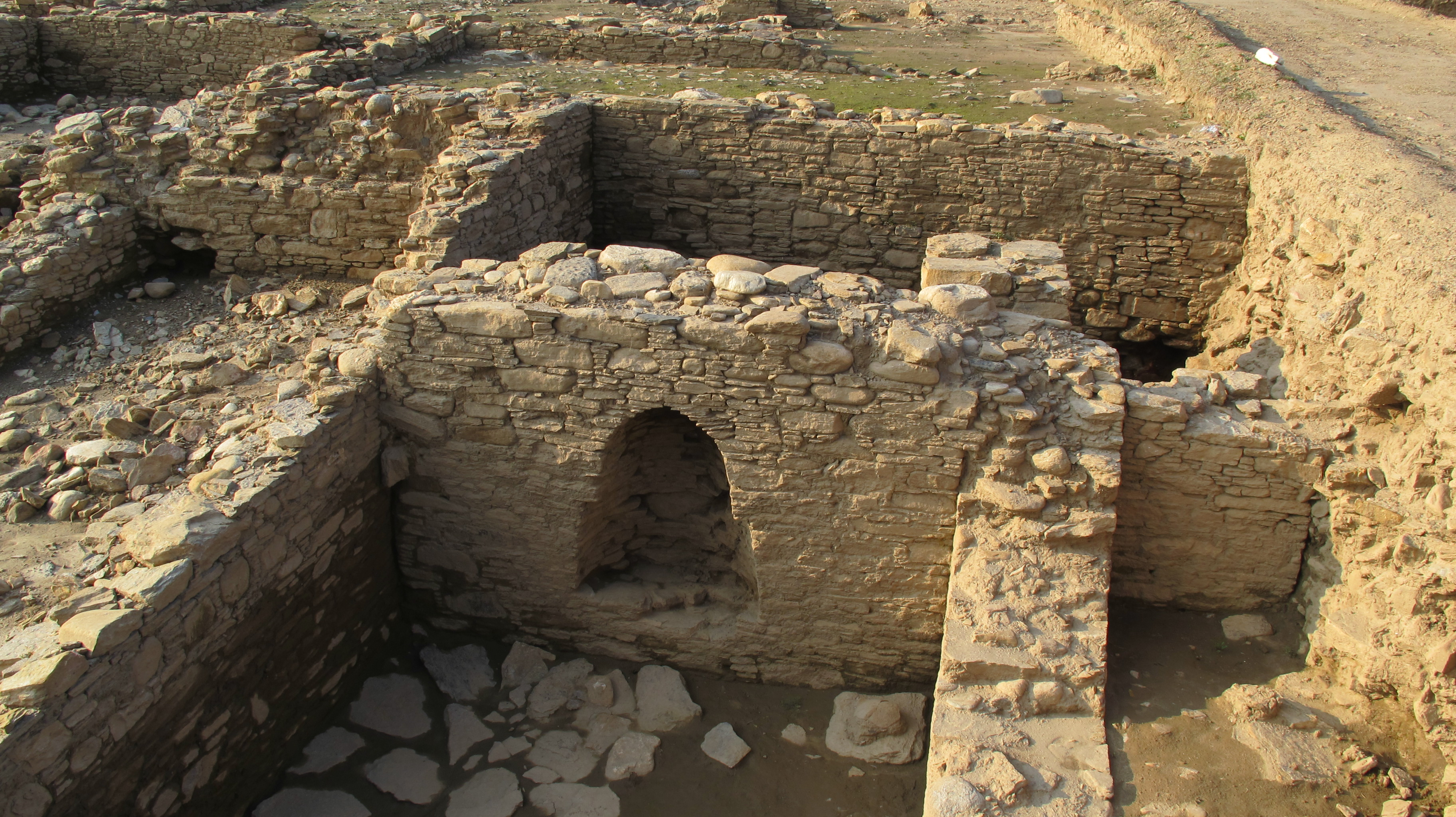
Ruins of the Indo-Greek city of Barikot

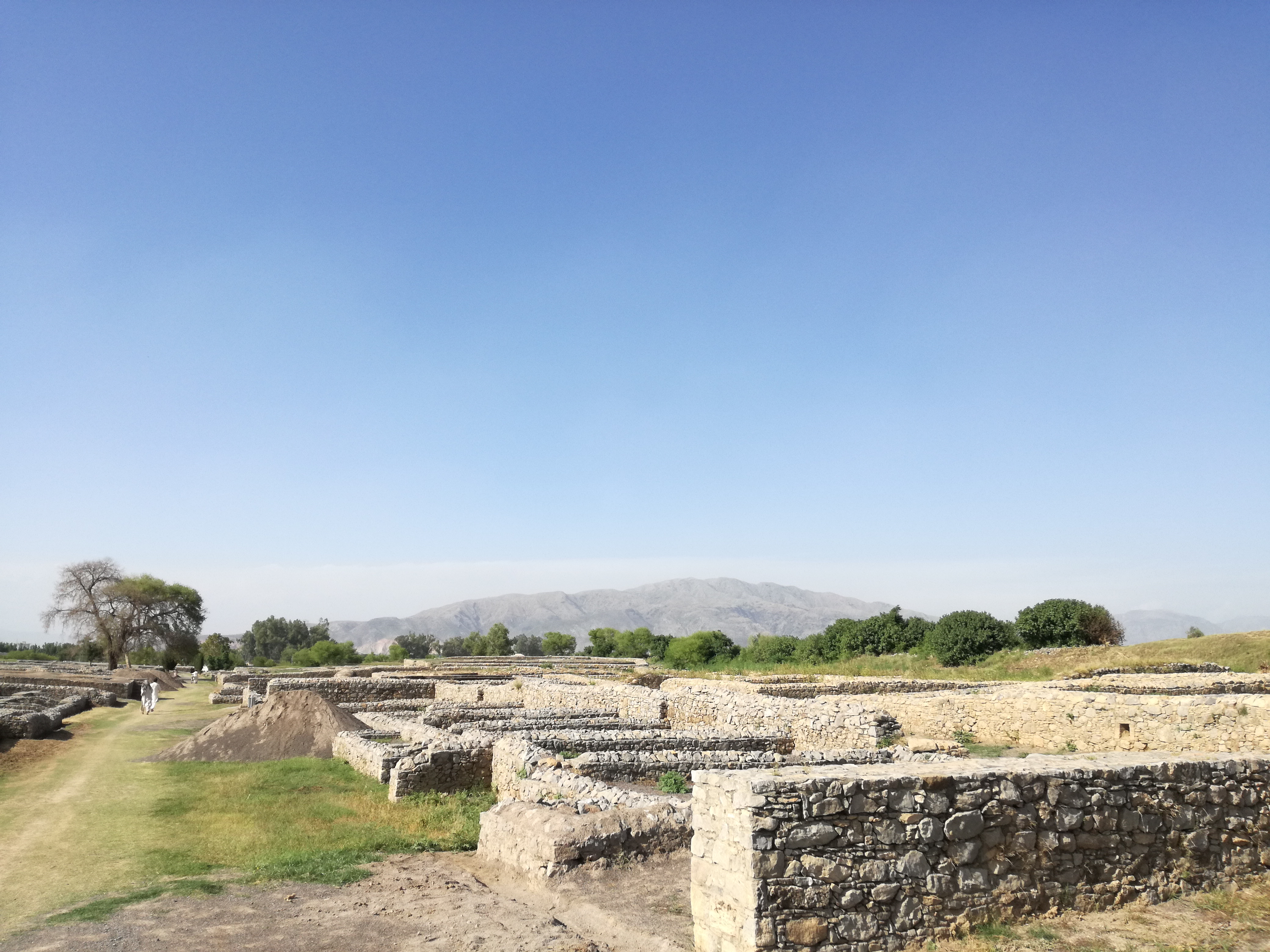
The Greek city of Sirkap, near Taxila

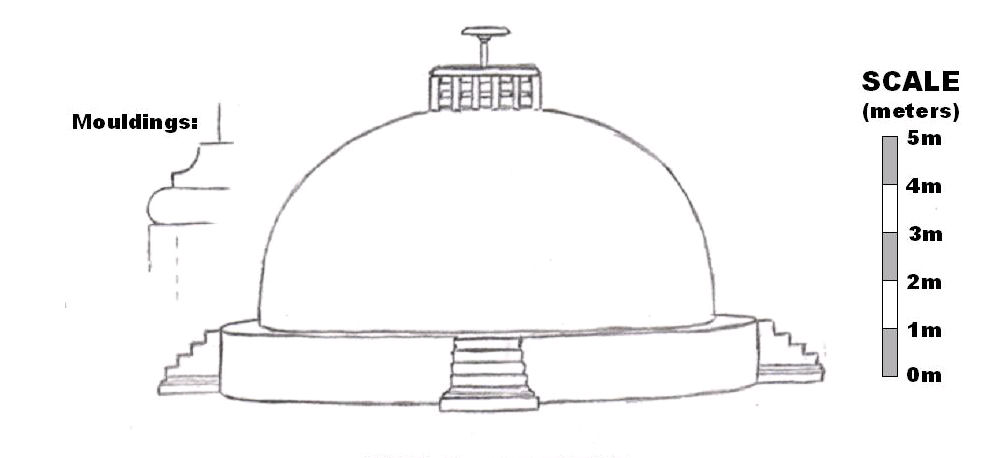
The Butkara stupa as expanded during the reign of Menander I.

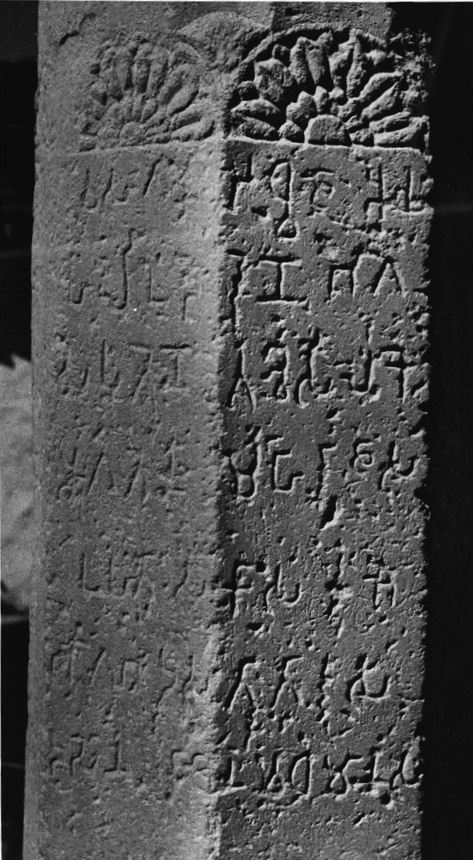
Detail of the Heliodorus pillar, with inscription in Brahmi by Heliodorus.

=== Indo-Greek artefacts in India ===
Few artefacts are known with certainty to belong to the Indo-Greeks. The Shinkot casket, a Buddhist relic casket was dedicated during the reign of Menander I, bearing his name in an inscription.

==== Stone palettes (circa 100 BCE) ====
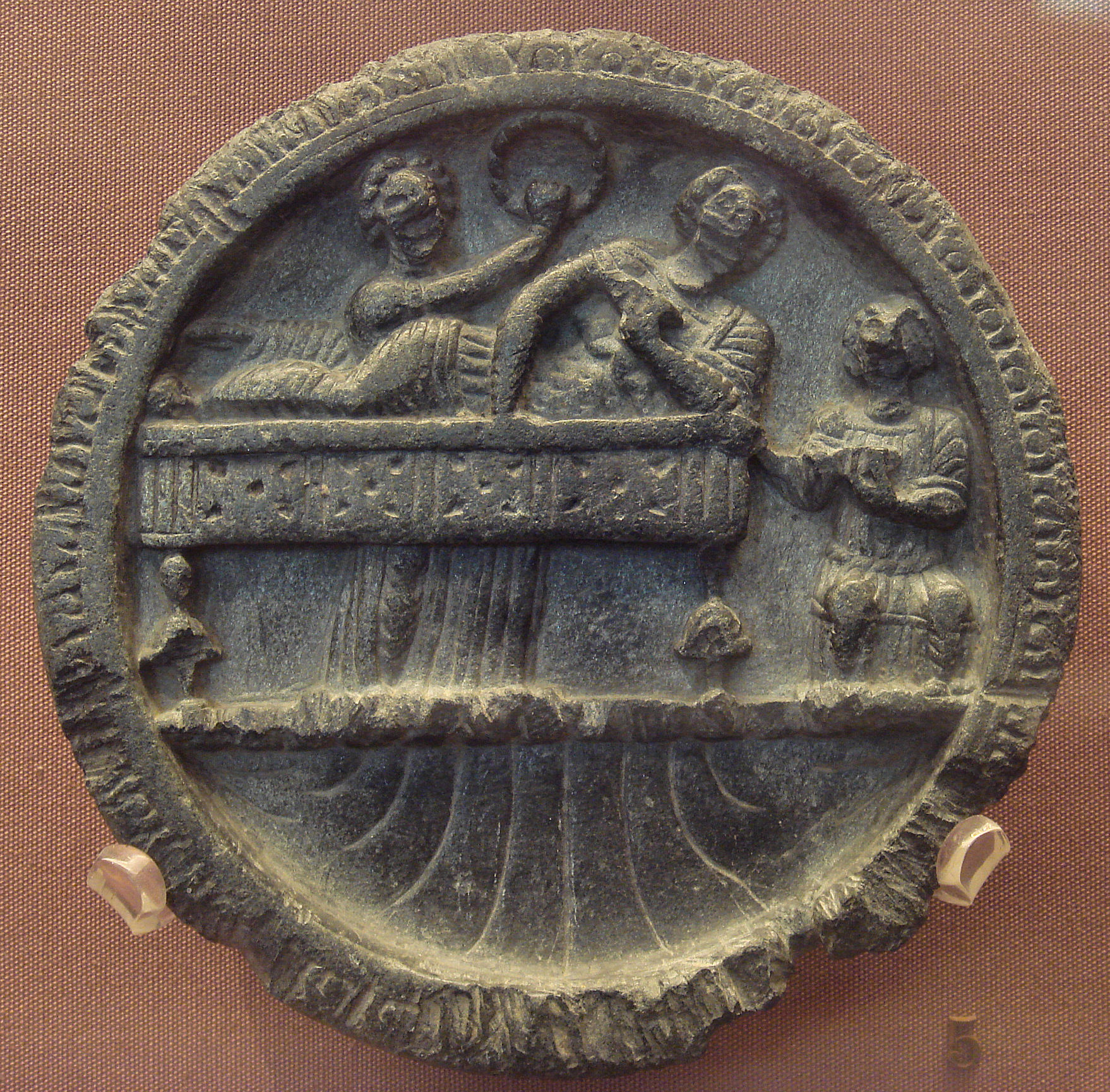
Type of stone palette excavated in the Greek levels at Sirkap.

Stone palette, also called "toilet tray" or "cosmetic trays") is a round tray commonly found in the areas of Bactria and Gandhara, and which usually represent Greek mythological scenes. Some of them are attributed to the Indo-Greek period in the 2nd and 1st century BCE. A few were retrieved from the Indo-Greek stratum No.5 at Sirkap. Some stone palettes with some very pure Hellenistic designs are thought to date to circa 100 BCE, and to have come from Taxila. Other have mythological themes, such as the Rape of Europa, which "could have only been made by a Greek patron during the Indo-Greek period".

==== Intaglio gems ====
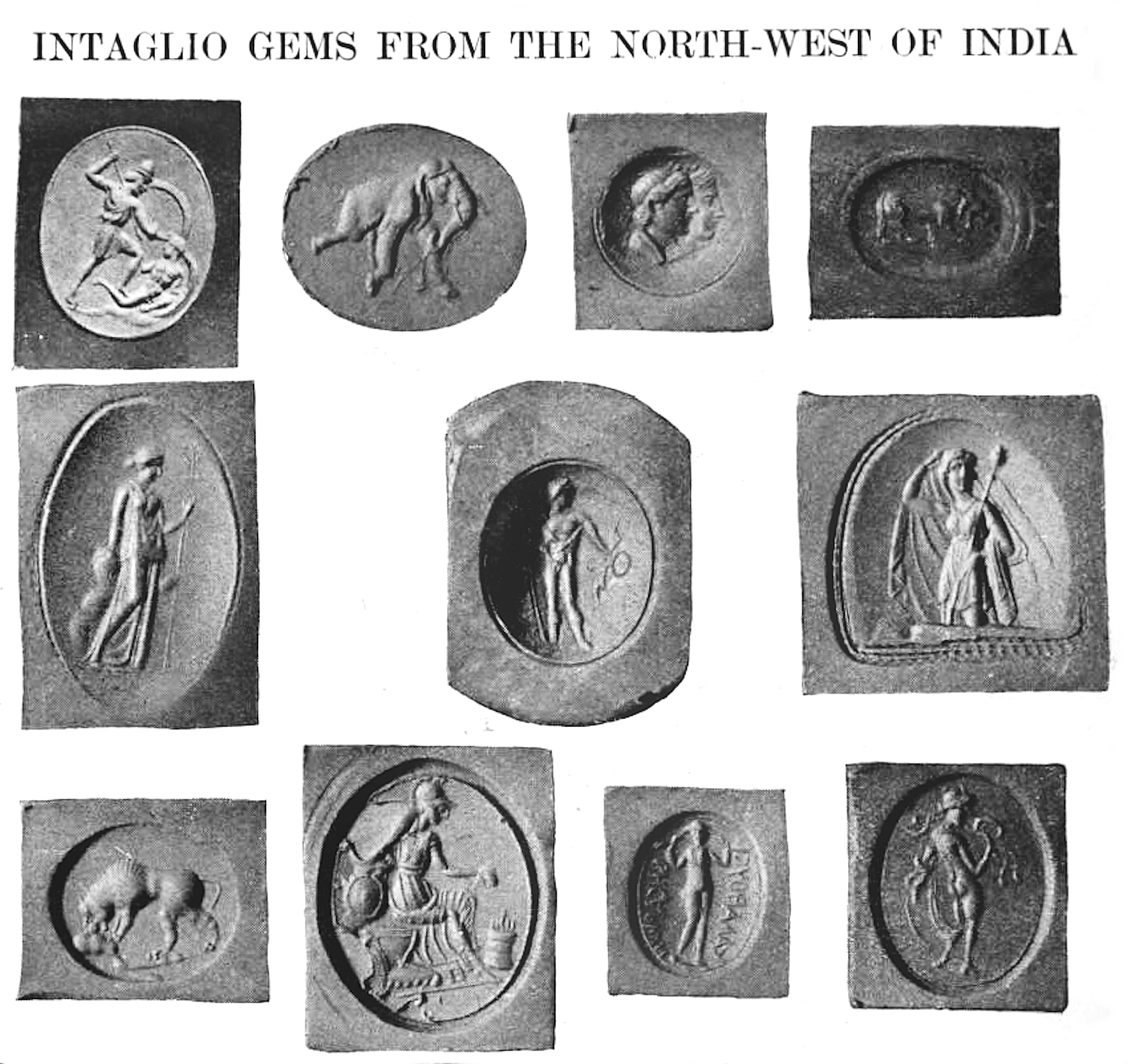
Intaglio gems from northwestern India, showing an evolution from Greek workmanship to more degraded forms, ranging from circa 2nd century BCE to 2nd century CE.

Intaglio gems from northwest India, showing an evolution from Greek workmanship to more degraded forms, range from circa 2nd century BCE to 2nd century CE.

==== Inscriptions and sculptures ====
Some inscriptions remain mentioning Indo-Greek rule, such as the Yavanarajya inscription, mentioned the rule of the Indo-Greeks in Mathura from the reign of Menander I to the period circa 50 BCE. Stone art and architecture began being produced at Mathura at the time of Indo-Greek hegemony over the region. Some authors consider that Indo-Greek cultural elements are not particularly visible in the art of Mathura, and Hellenistic influence is not more important than in other parts of India. Others consider that Hellenistic influence appears in the liveliness and the realistic details of the figures (an evolution compared to the stiffness of Mauryan art), the use of perspective from 150 BCE, iconographical details such as the knot and the club of Heracles, the wavy folds of the dresses, or the depiction of bacchanalian scenes. The art of Mathura became extremely influential over the rest of India, and was "the most prominent artistic production center from the second century BCE".

Excavation at Semthan in southern Kashmir have revealed a Greek settlement. Many figurines in the Hellenistic style were found during the excavations. The female figurines are fully dressed, with the left leg slightly bent, and wear the Greek chiton and himation, and the Hellenistic styles of Bactria are probably the ultimate source of these designs. It is thought that the Indo-Greeks introduced their artistic styles into the area as they moved eastward from the area of Gandhara into South Kashmir.

Such Hellenistic draped figurines have not been found at Taxila or Charsadda, although they are known to have been Greek cities, but probably this is mainly because excavations to Greek levels have been very limited: in Sirkap, only one eight of the excavations were made down to the Indo-Greek and early Saka levels, and only in an area far removed from the center of the ancient city, where few finds could be expected.

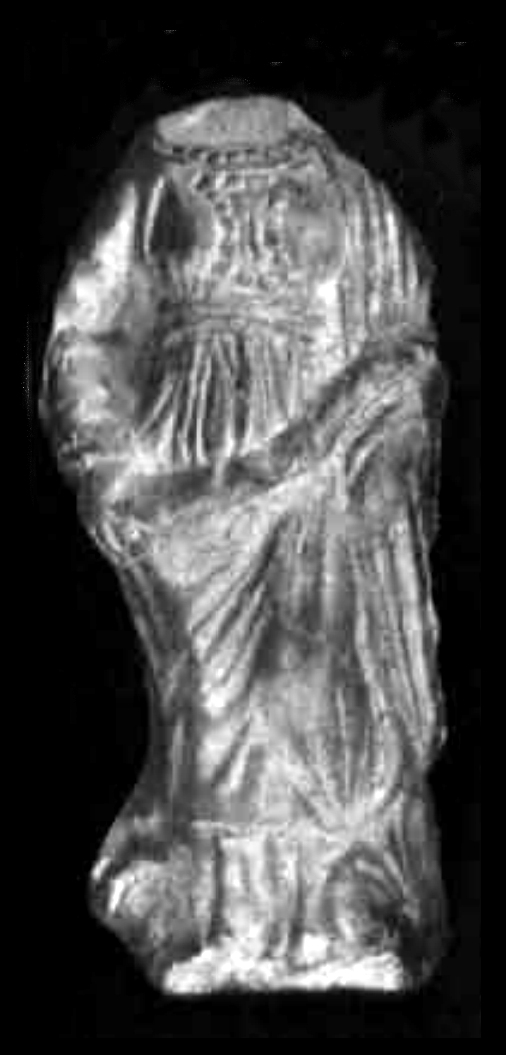
Terracotta statuette in Chiton and Himation, Semthan, Southern Kashmir

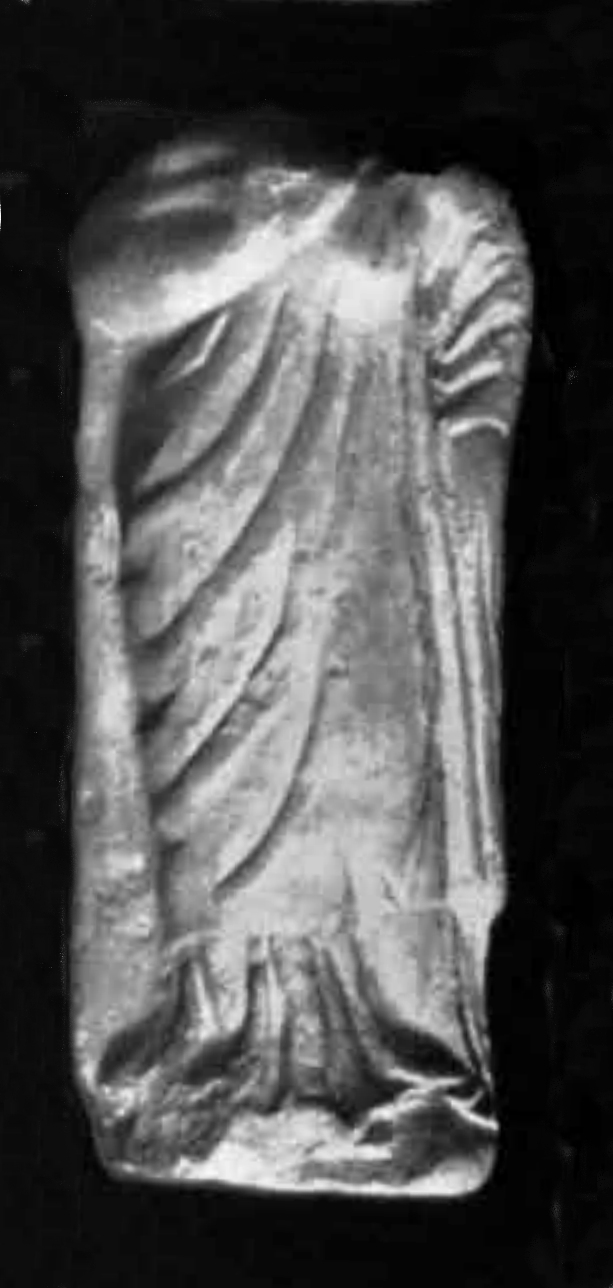
Male Hellenistic dress, Semthan

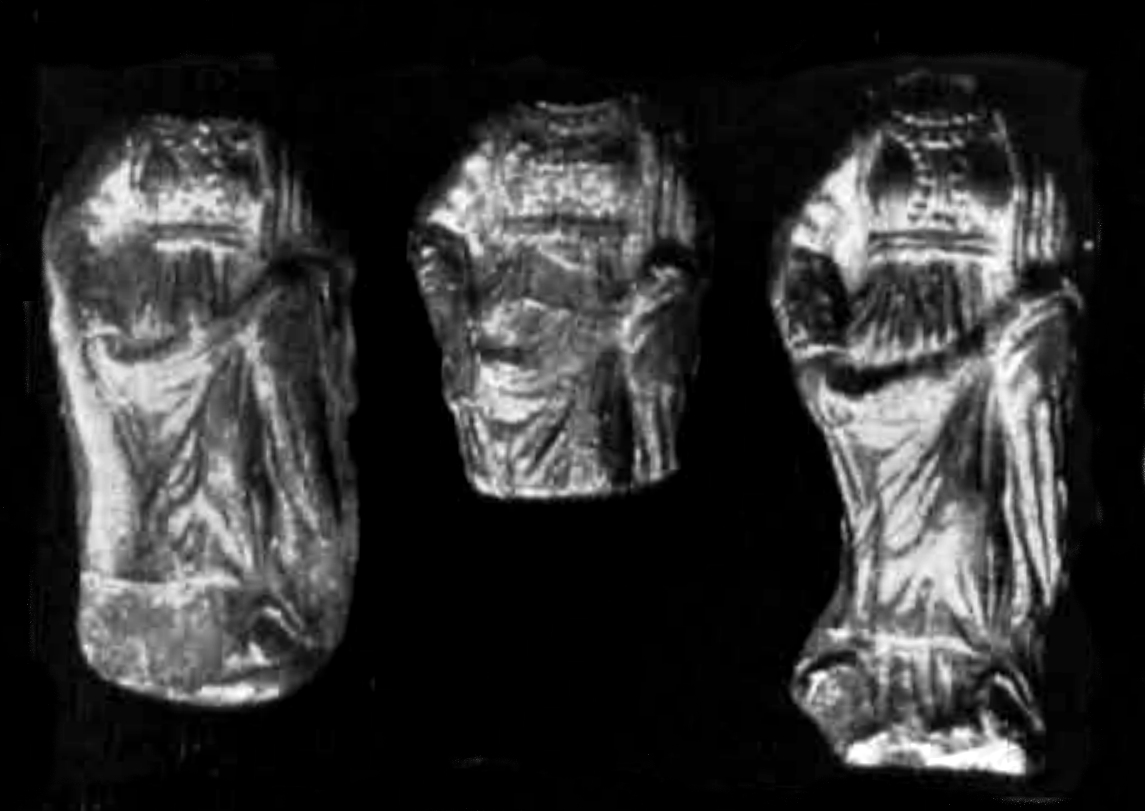
Semthan, female Hellenistic dresses

==== Buddhist reliquaries ====
Pyxides and Buddhist reliquaries

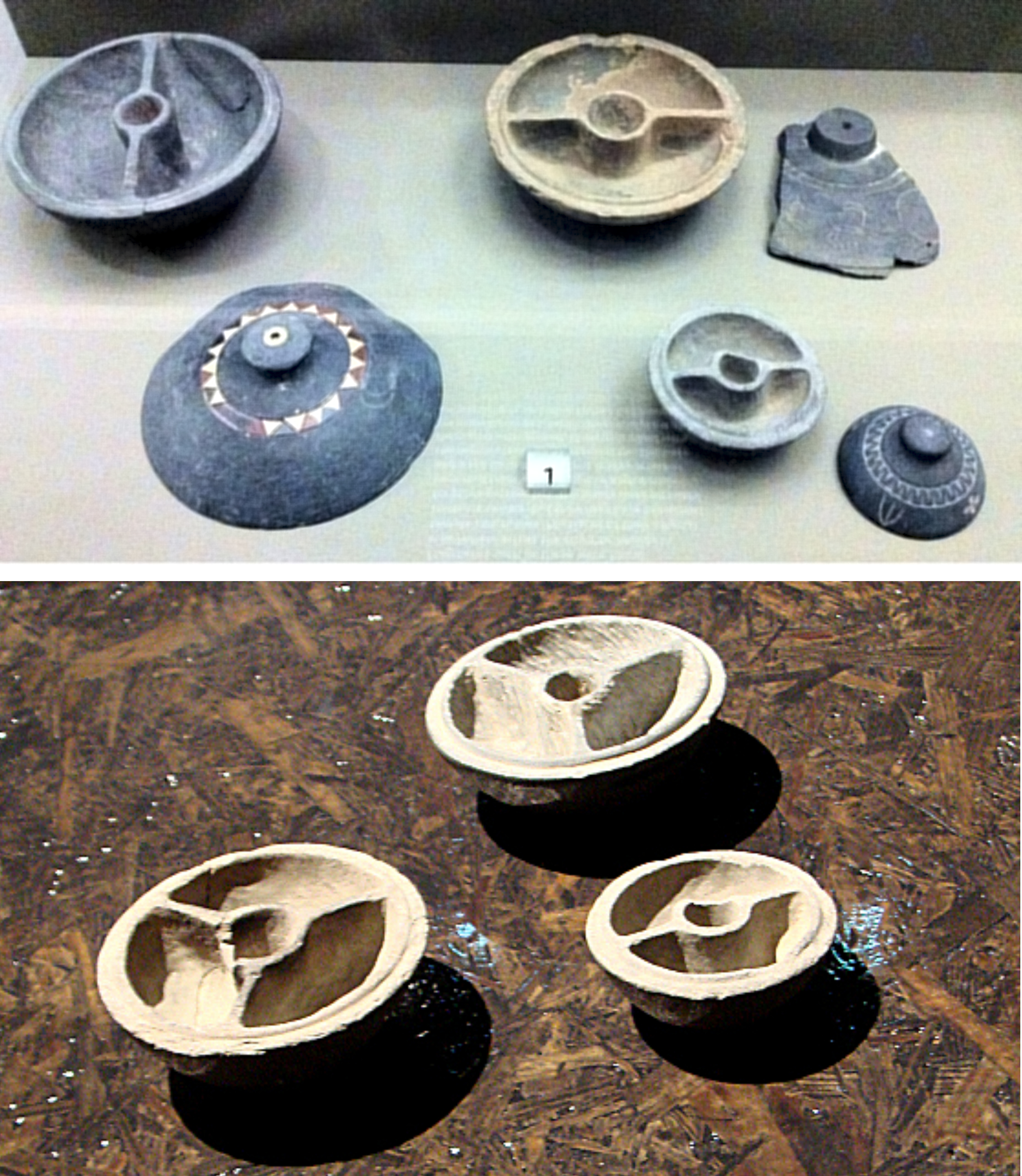
Ai-Khanoum "Pyxis" stone containers,3rd-2nd century BCE

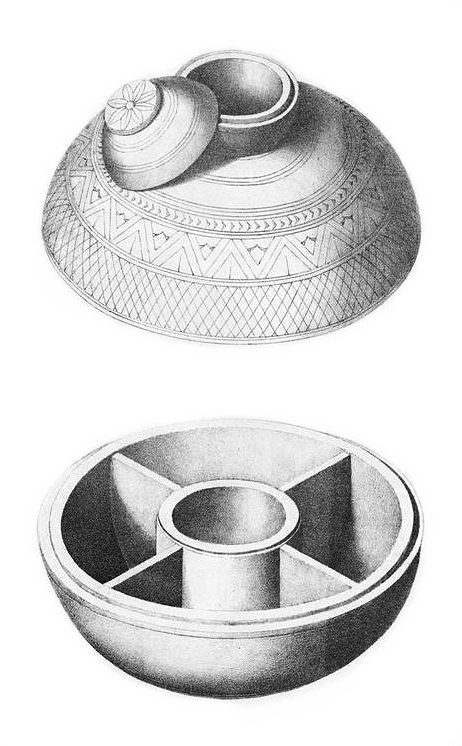
Darunta reliquary and Rukhuna reliquary, 1st century CE.

According to Harry Falk Buddhist stone reliquaries, which were generally place insided stupas with precious relics of the Buddha or other saints, are directly derived from the stone pyxis which have been excavated at Ai-Khanoum and originated in the west. The Ai-Khanoum stone containers are thought to have played a religious role, and were apparently used to burn incense. The shapes, material, and decoration are very similar to the later Buddhist containers, down to the compartmentalization inside the containers themselves. One such containers the Shinkot casket, is a Buddhist relics container which was engraved with the name of the Indo-Greek king Menander I.

The Bimaran reliquary, with one of the earliest known images of the Buddha, is generally dated to a period corresponding the end of Indo-Greek rule circa 1-15 CE, but was actually deposited by one of the Indo-Scythian successors of the Indo-Greeks, names Kharahostes. The Bimaran casket already displays a combination of Hellenistic design elements with Indian ones, such as the arches and the lotus design.

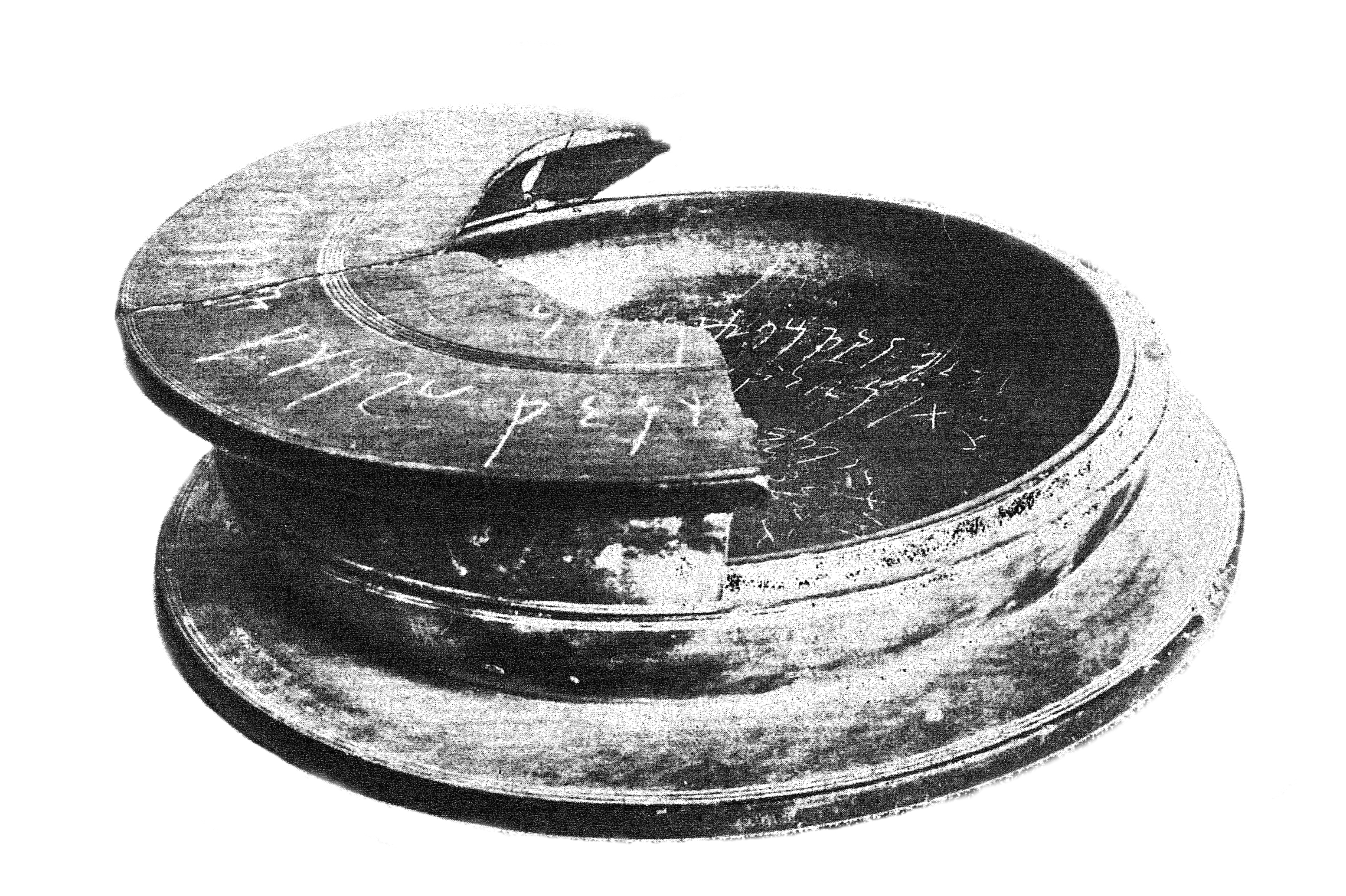
The Shinkot casket, a Buddhist relics container in the name of Menander I

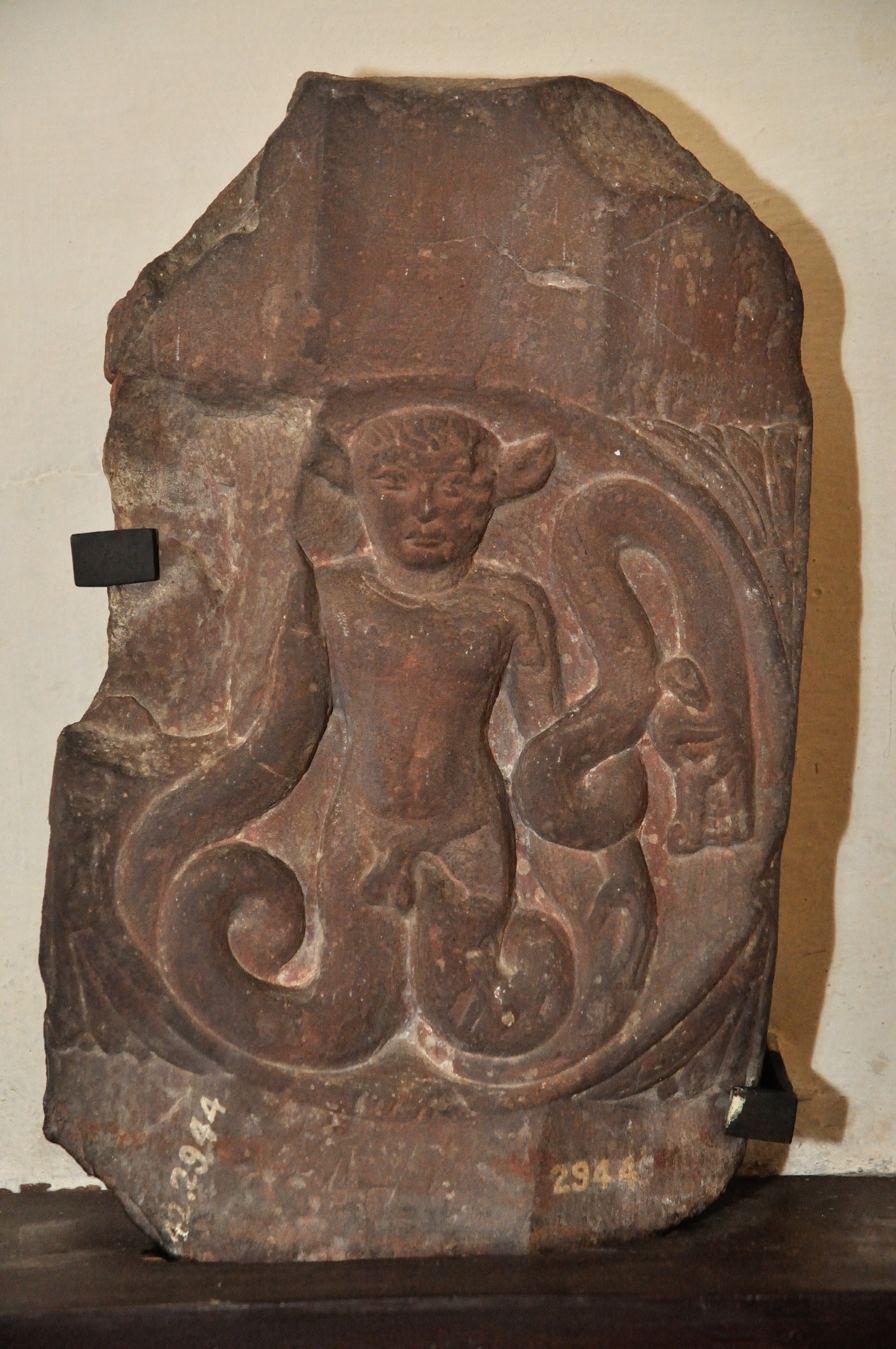
An anguiped, also seen in Hellenistic and Roman art, Mathura art, c. 1st century BCE.

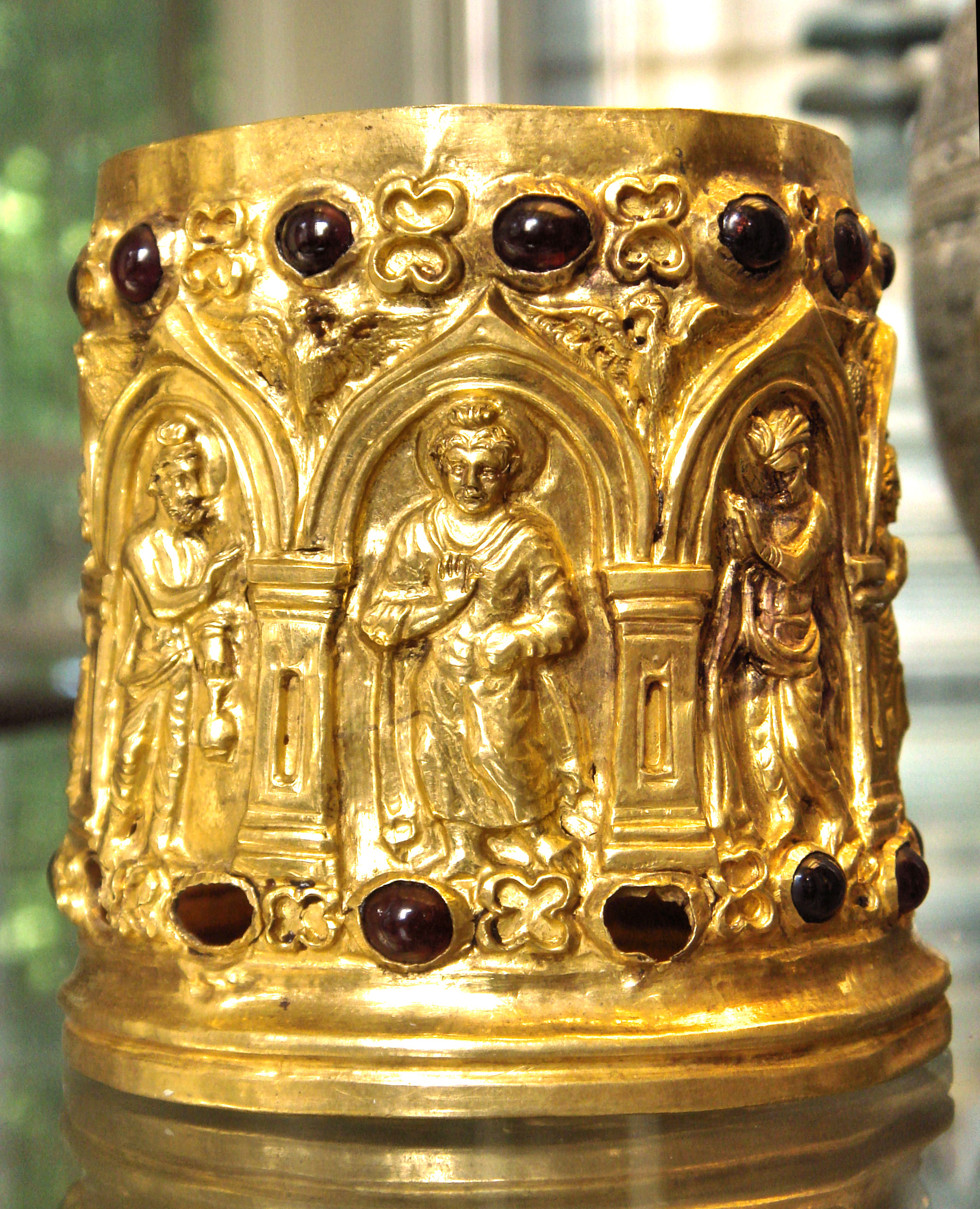
The Bimaran reliquary is often dated to circa 1-15 CE, at the time of the last Indo-Greek kings.

=== Architecture and statuary under the Indo-Greeks in Mathura (180-70 BCE) ===
==== Architecture ====
From time of the Mauryan Empire, India was able to use as an example the architectural work of the Greco-Bactrians and the Indo-Greeks from the 3rd to the 1st centuries BCE, with influences which are clearly visible in the Hellenistic designs, such as flame palmettes, beads and reels used and adapted from that time in Indian art.

==== Stone statuary ====
Early Mathura statuary
150-100 BCE

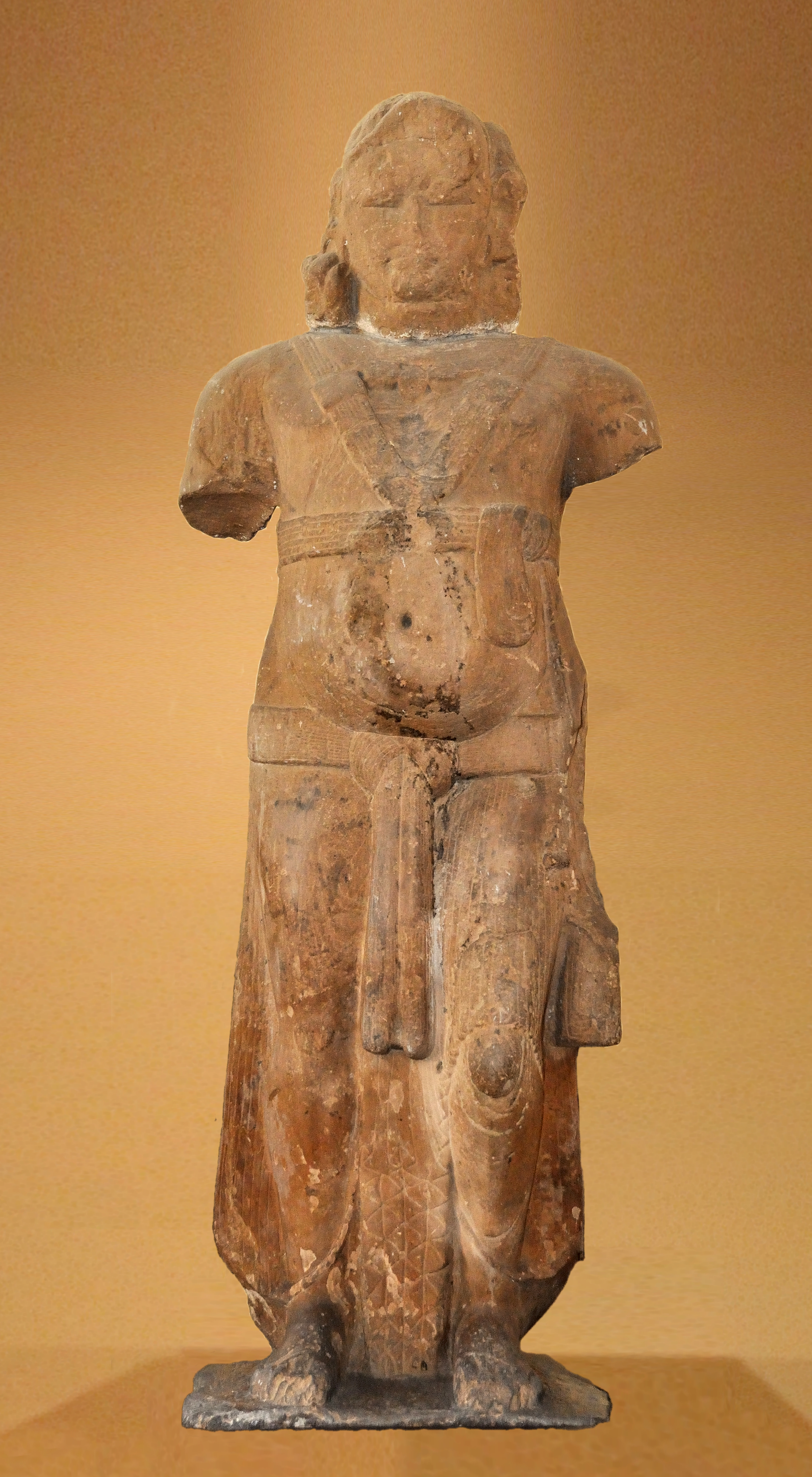
"Parkham Yaksha" Manibhadra, 150 BCE

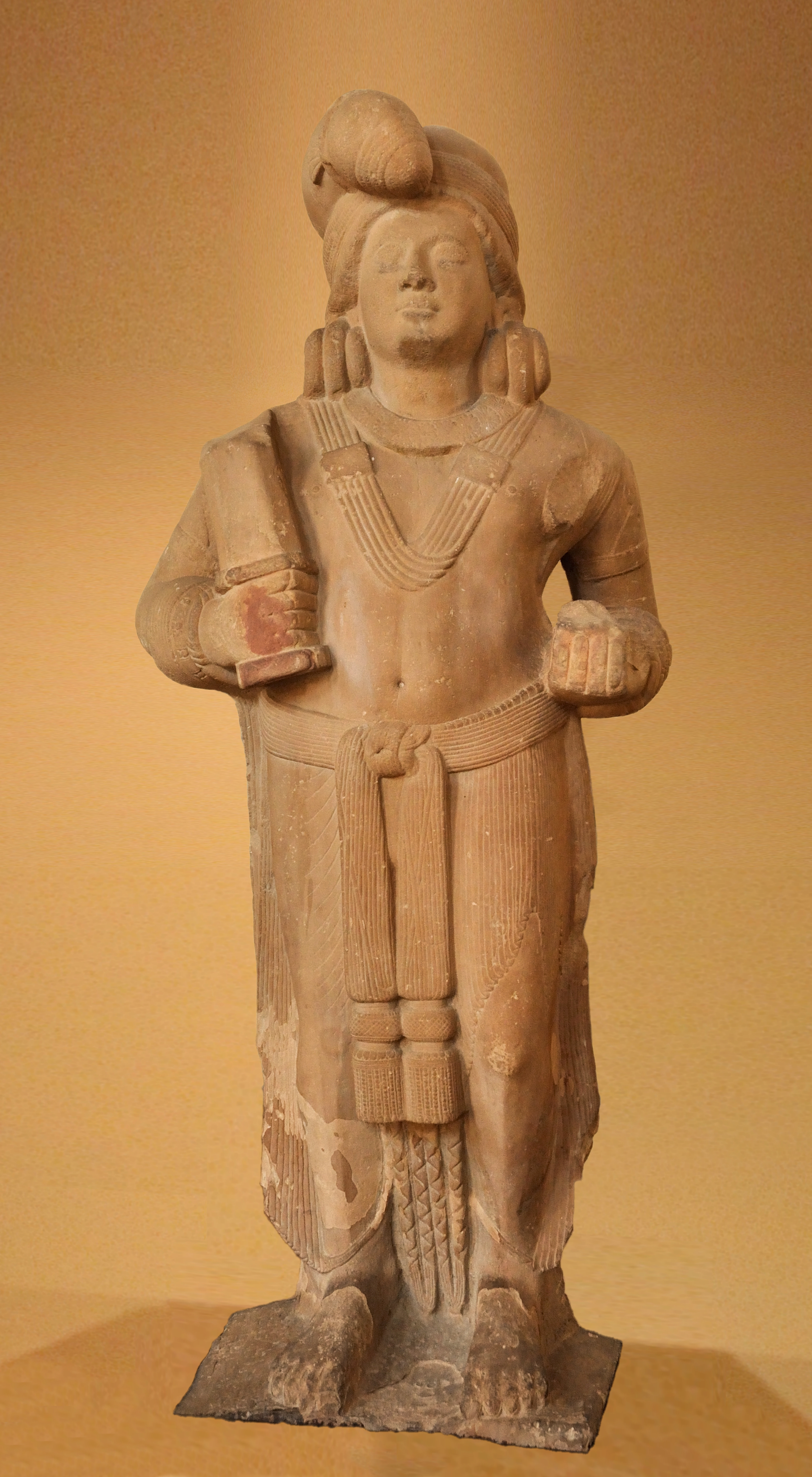
"Mudgarpani" Yaksha ("Mace-holder"), 100 BCE

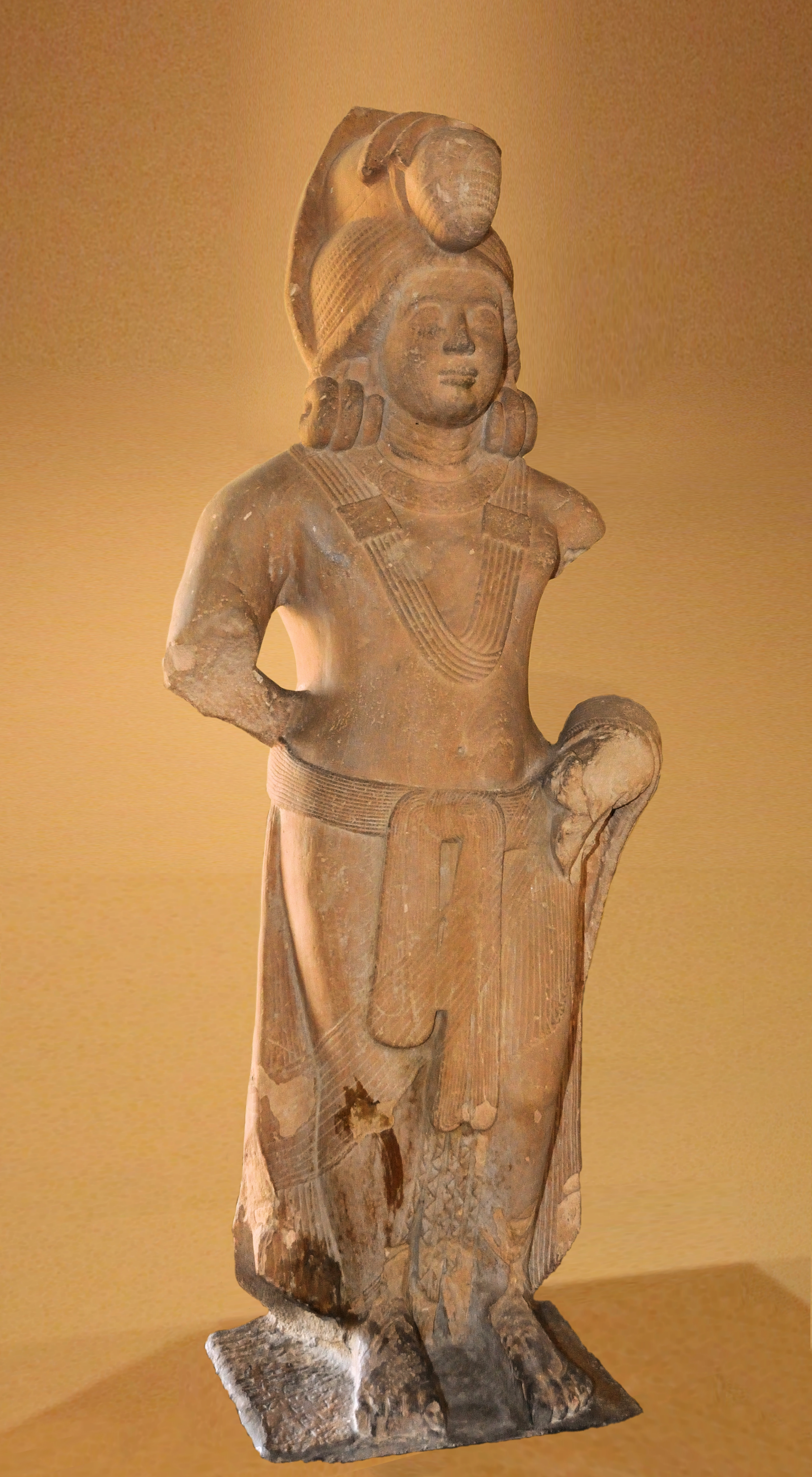
"Agnipani" Yaksha ("Fire-holder"), 100 BCE

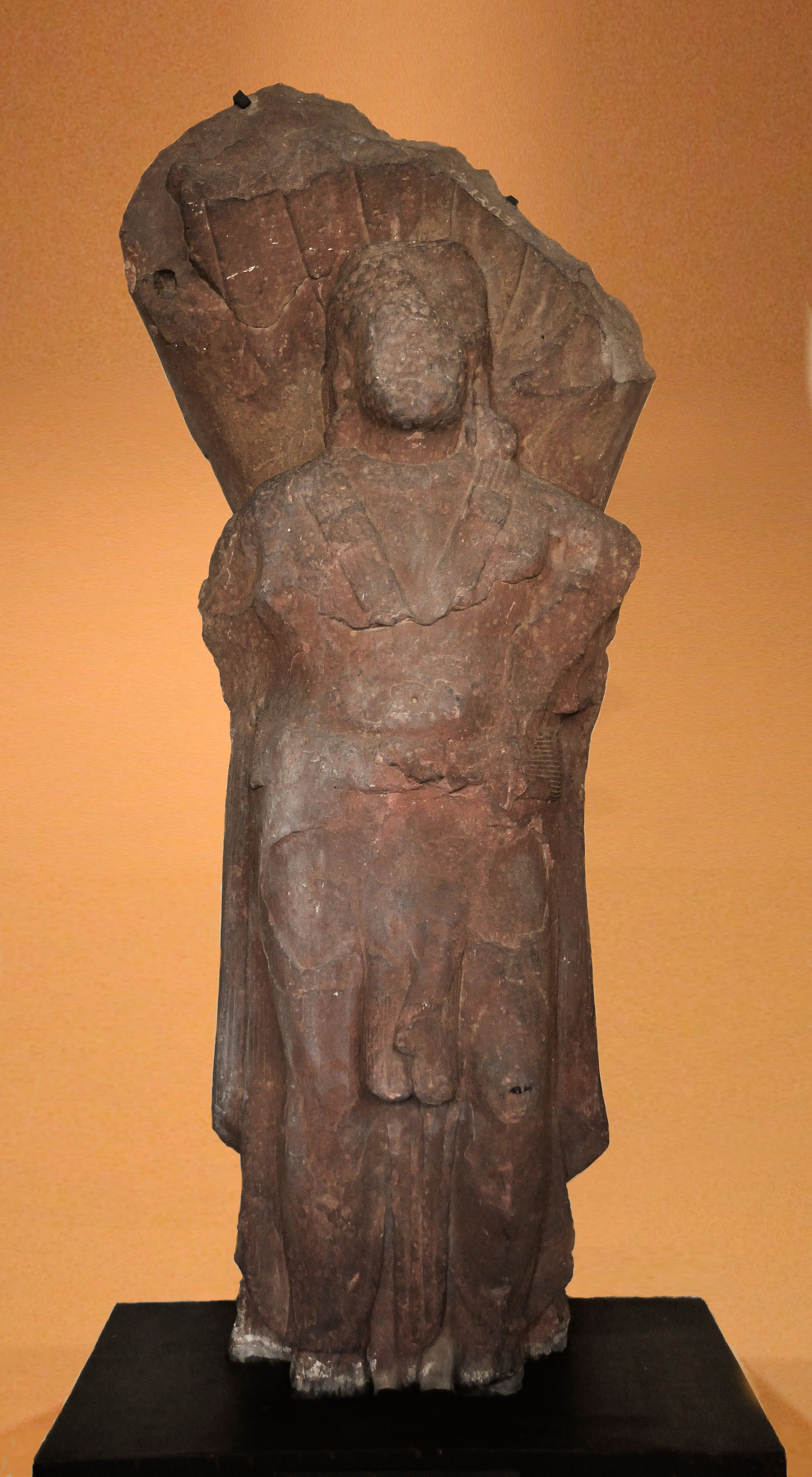
Nāga, the Serpent God
150 BCE

These colossal statues are about 2 meters tall. Many have known attributes: Mudgarpani has a mudgar mace in the right hand, and had a small standing devotee or child in the left hand, the Fire God Agni has an aureole with incised flames and held a water flask in the left hand, the Nāga has a hood formed by serpents. Mathura Museum

Following the demise of the Mauryan Empire and its replacement by the Shunga Empire in eastern India, numismatic, literary and epigraphic evidence suggest that the Indo-Greeks, when they invaded India, occupied the area of Mathura for close to a century from circa 180 BCE and the time of Menander I until approximately 70 BCE, with the Sungas remaining eastward of Mathura. An inscription in Mathura discovered in 1988, the "Yavanarajya inscription", mentions "The last day of year 116 of Yavana hegemony (Yavanarajya)", suggesting the presence of the Indo-Greeks in the 2nd-1st century BC in Mathura down to 70 or 69 BC. On the contrary, the Sungas, are thought to have been absent from Mathura, as no epigraphical remains or coins have been found, and to have been based to the east of the Mathura region.

Stone art and architecture began being produced at Mathura at the time of "Indo-Greek hegemony" over the region. Some authors consider that Indo-Greek cultural elements are not particularly visible in these works, and Hellenistic influence is not more important than in other parts of India. Others consider that Hellenistic influence appears in the liveliness and the realistic details of the figures (an evolution compared to the stiffness of Mauryan art), the use of perspective from 150 BCE, iconographical details such as the knot and the club of Heracles, the wavy folds of the dresses, or the depiction of bacchanalian scenes:

"Mathura sculpture is distinguished by several qualitative features of art, culture and religious history. The geographical position of the city on the highway leading from the Madhyadesa towards Madra-Gandhara contributed in a large measure to the eclectic nature of its culture. Mathura became the meeting ground of the traditions of the early Indian art of Bharhut and Sanchi together with strong influences of the Iranian and the Indo-Bactrian or the Gandhara art from the North-West. The Persepolitan capitals with human-headed animal figures and volutes as well as the presence of the battlement motif as a decorative element point to Iranian affinities. These influences came partly as a result of the general saturation of foreign motifs in early Indian sculpture as found in the Stupas of Bharhut and Sanchi also."

— Vasudeva Shrarana Agrawala, Masterpieces of Mathura sculpture

The art of Mathura became extremely influential over the rest of India, and was "the most prominent artistic production center from the second century BCE".

==== Colossal anthropomorphic statues (2nd century BCE) ====
Yakshas seems to have been the object of an important cult in the early periods of Indian history, many of them being known such as Kubera, king of the Yakshas, Manibhadra or Mudgarpani. The Yakshas are a broad class of nature-spirits, usually benevolent, but sometimes mischievous or capricious, connected with water, fertility, trees, the forest, treasure and wilderness, and were the object of popular worship. Many of them were later incorporated into Buddhism, Jainism or Hinduism.

In the 2nd century BCE, Yakshas became the focus of the creation of colossal cultic images, typically around 2 meters or more in height, which are considered as probably the first Indian anthropomorphic productions in stone. Although few ancient Yaksha statues remains in good condition, the vigor of the style has been applauded, and expresses essentially Indian qualities. They are often pot-bellied, two-armed and fierce-looking. The Yashas are often depicted with weapons or attributes, such as the Yaksha Mudgarpani who in the right hand holds a mudgar mace, and in the left hand the figure of a small standing devotee or child joining hands in prayer. It is often suggested that the style of the colossal Yaksha statuary had an important influence on the creation of later divine images and human figures in India. The female equivalent of the Yashas were the Yashinis, often associated with trees and children, and whose voluptuous figures became omnipresent in Indian art.

Some Hellenistic influence, such as the geometrical folds of the drapery or the walking stance of the statues, has been suggested. According to John Boardman, the hem of the dress in the monumental early Yaksha statues is derived from Greek art. Describing the drapery of one of these statues, John Boardman writes: "It has no local antecedents and looks most like a Greek Late Archaic mannerism", and suggests it is possibly derived from the Hellenistic art of nearby Bactria where this design is known.

In the production of colossal Yaksha statues carved in the round, which can be found in several locations in northern India, the art of Mathura is considered as the most advanced in quality and quantity during this period. Colossal Nāga statues are also known from this period in Mathura, also denoting an early cult of this deity.

== Incipient Greco-Buddhist art ==
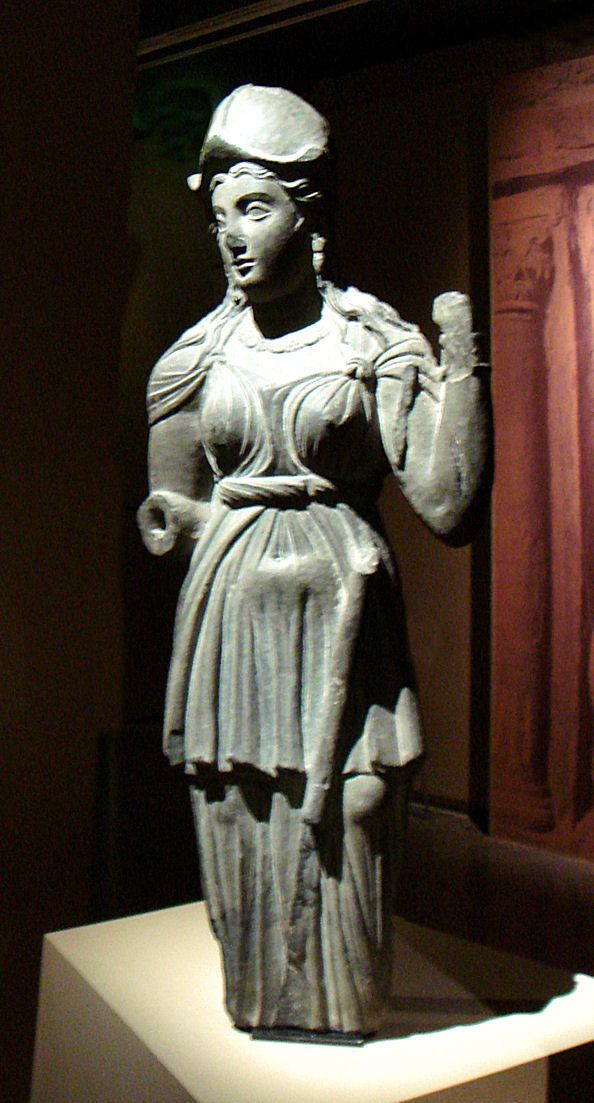
Gandharan Athena Lahore Museum

The possibility of a direct connection between the Indo-Greeks and Greco-Buddhist art has been reaffirmed recently as the dating of the rule of Indo-Greek kings has been extended to the first decades of the 1st century CE, with the reign of Strato II in the Punjab. Also, Foucher, Tarn and more recently Boardman, Bussagli or McEvilley have taken the view that some of the most purely Hellenistic works of northwestern India, Pakistan and Afghanistan, may actually be wrongly attributed to later centuries, and instead belong to a period one or two centuries earlier, to the time of the Indo-Greeks in the 2nd-1st century BCE:

This is particularly the case of some purely Hellenistic works in Hadda, Afghanistan, an area which "might indeed be the cradle of incipient Buddhist sculpture in Indo-Greek style". Referring to one of the Buddha triads in Hadda (drawing), in which the Buddha is sided by very Classical depictions of Herakles/Vajrapani and Tyche/Hariti, Boardman explains that both figures "might at first (and even second) glance, pass as, say, from Asia Minor or Syria of the first or second century BC (...) these are essentially Greek figures, executed by artists fully conversant with far more than the externals of the Classical style". Many of the works of art at Hadda can also be compared to the style of the 2nd century BCE sculptures of the Hellenistic world, such as those of the Temple of Olympia at Bassae in Greece, which could also suggest roughly contemporary dates.

Alternatively, it has been suggested that these works of art may have been executed by itinerant Greek artists during the time of maritime contacts with the West from the 1st to the 3rd century CE.

The supposition that such highly Hellenistic and, at the same time Buddhist, works of art belong to the Indo-Greek period would be consistent with the known Buddhist activity of the Indo-Greeks (the Milinda Panha etc...), their Hellenistic cultural heritage which would naturally have induced them to produce extensive statuary, their know artistic proficiency as seen on their coins until around 50 BCE, and the dated appearance of already complex iconography incorporating Hellenistic sculptural codes with the Bimaran casket in the early 1st century CE.

== Greek-looking people in the art of Gandhara ==
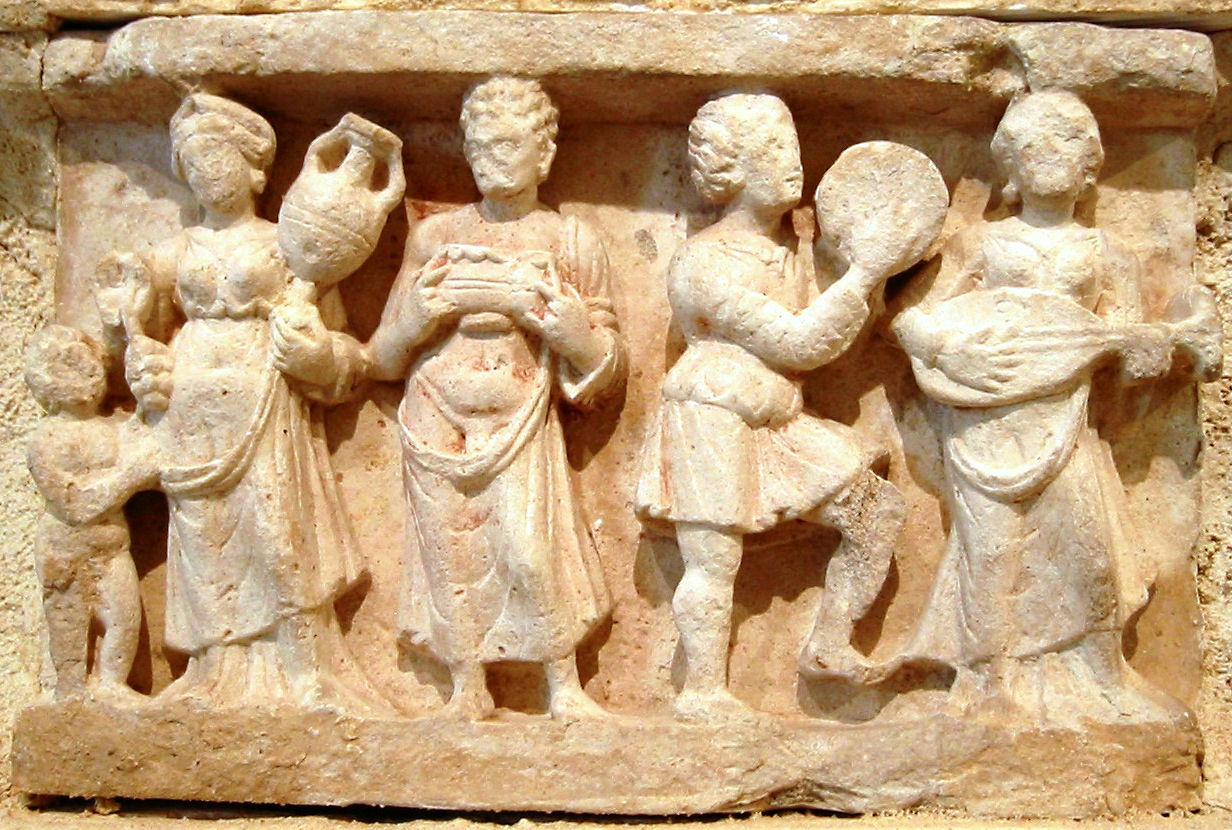
Hellenistic culture in the Indian subcontinent: Greek clothes, amphoras, wine and music (Detail of Chakhil-i-Ghoundi stupa, Hadda, Gandhara, 1st century CE).

The Greco-Buddhist art of Gandhara, beyond the omnipresence of Greek style and stylistic elements which might be simply considered as an enduring artistic tradition, offers numerous depictions of people in Greek Classical realistic style, attitudes and fashion (clothes such as the chiton and the himation, similar in form and style to the 2nd century BCE Greco-Bactrian statues of Ai-Khanoum, hairstyle), holding contraptions which are characteristic of Greek culture (amphoras, "kantaros" Greek drinking cups), in situations which can range from festive (such as Bacchanalian scenes) to Buddhist-devotional.

Uncertainties in dating make it unclear whether these works of art actually depict Greeks of the period of Indo-Greek rule up to the 1st century BCE, or remaining Greek communities under the rule of the Indo-Parthians or Kushans in the 1st and 2nd century CE.

=== Hellenistic groups ===
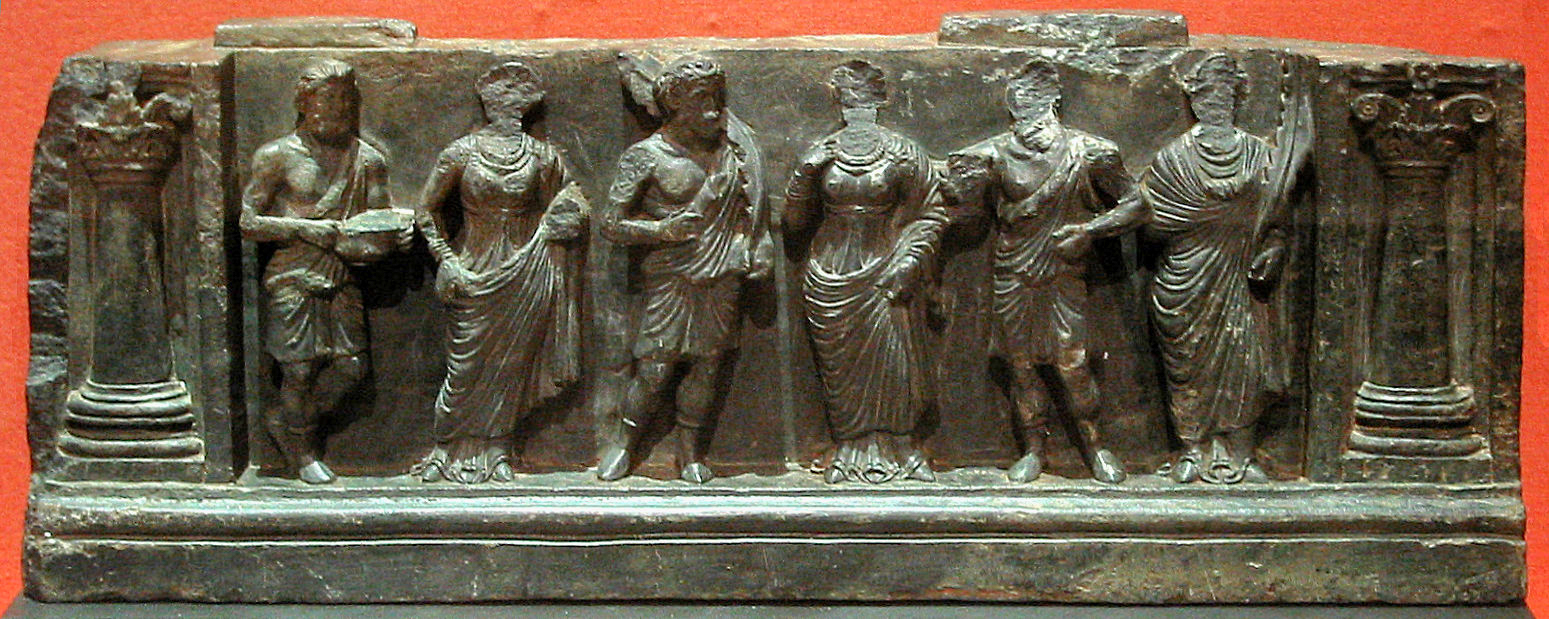
Greek Buddhist devotees, holding plantain leaves, in purely Hellenistic style, inside Corinthian columns, Buner relief, Victoria and Albert Museum.

A series of reliefs, several of them known as the Buner reliefs which were taken during the 19th century from Buddhist structures near the area of Buner in northern Pakistan, depict in perfect Hellenistic style gatherings of people in Greek dress, socializing, drinking or playing music. They have been called "Proto-Gandharan", and are considered to be "slightly later" then the earliest stone palettes, themselves dated to circa 100 BCE. Some other of these reliefs depict Indo-Scythian soldiers in uniform, sometimes playing instruments. Finally, revelling Indian in dhotis richly adorned with jewelry are also shown. These are considered some of the most artistically perfect, and earliest, of Gandharan sculptures, and are thought to exalt multicultural interaction within the context of Buddhism, in the 1st century BCE or the 1st century CE.

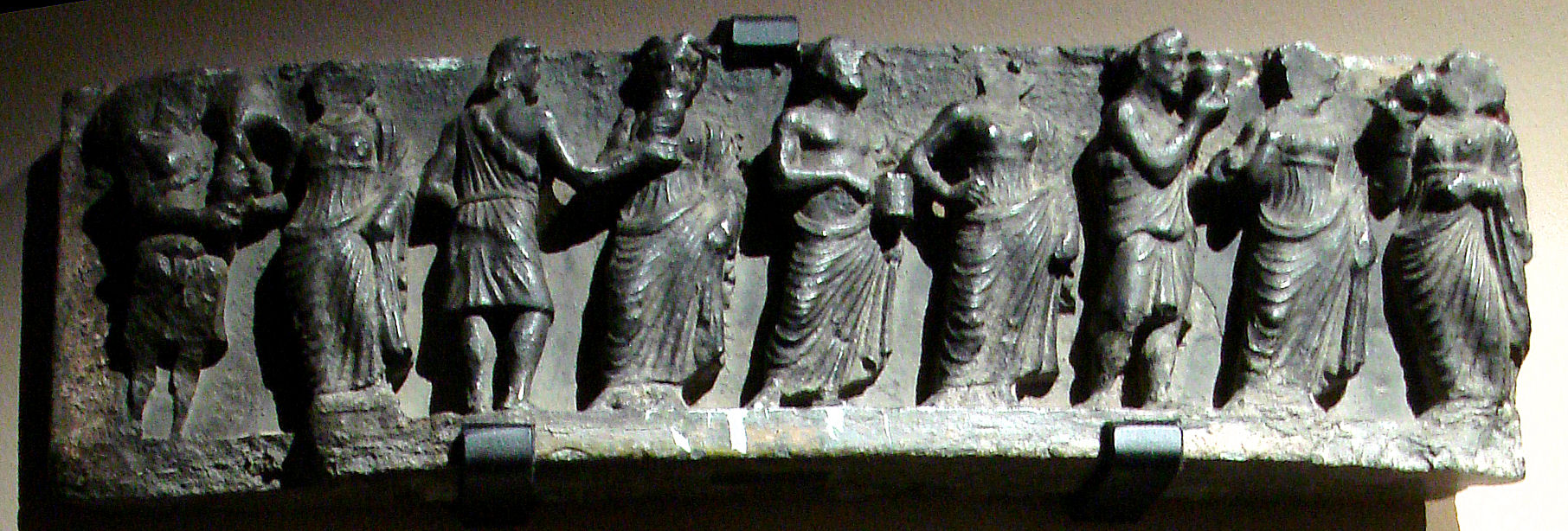
Hellenistic drinking scene.

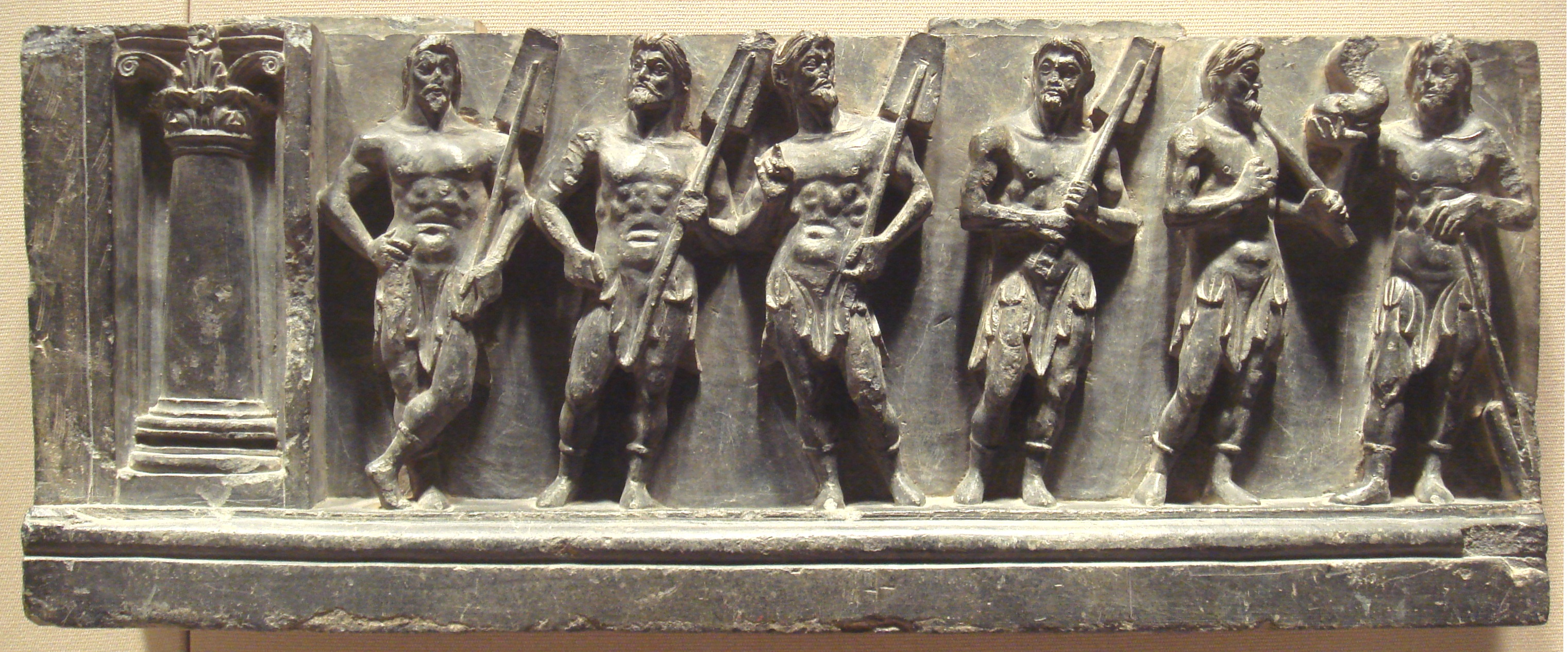
Hellenistic marine deities, Gandhara, 1st century.

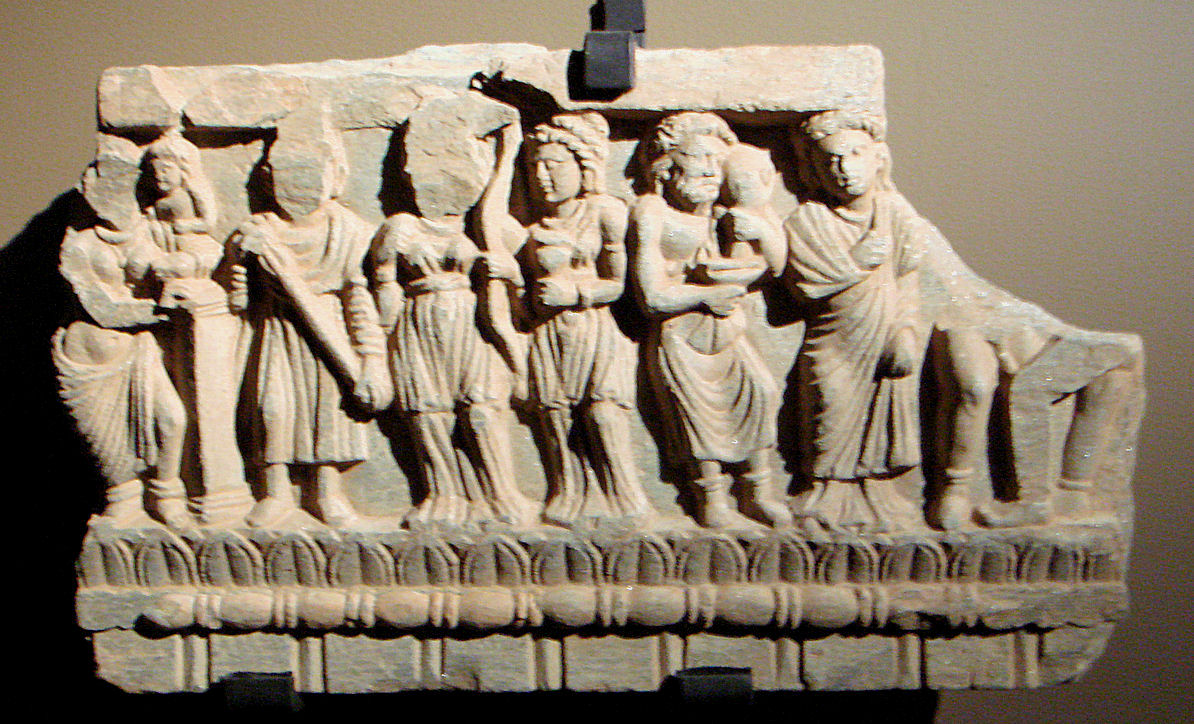
Hellenistic drinking scene, Sar Khi Derri.

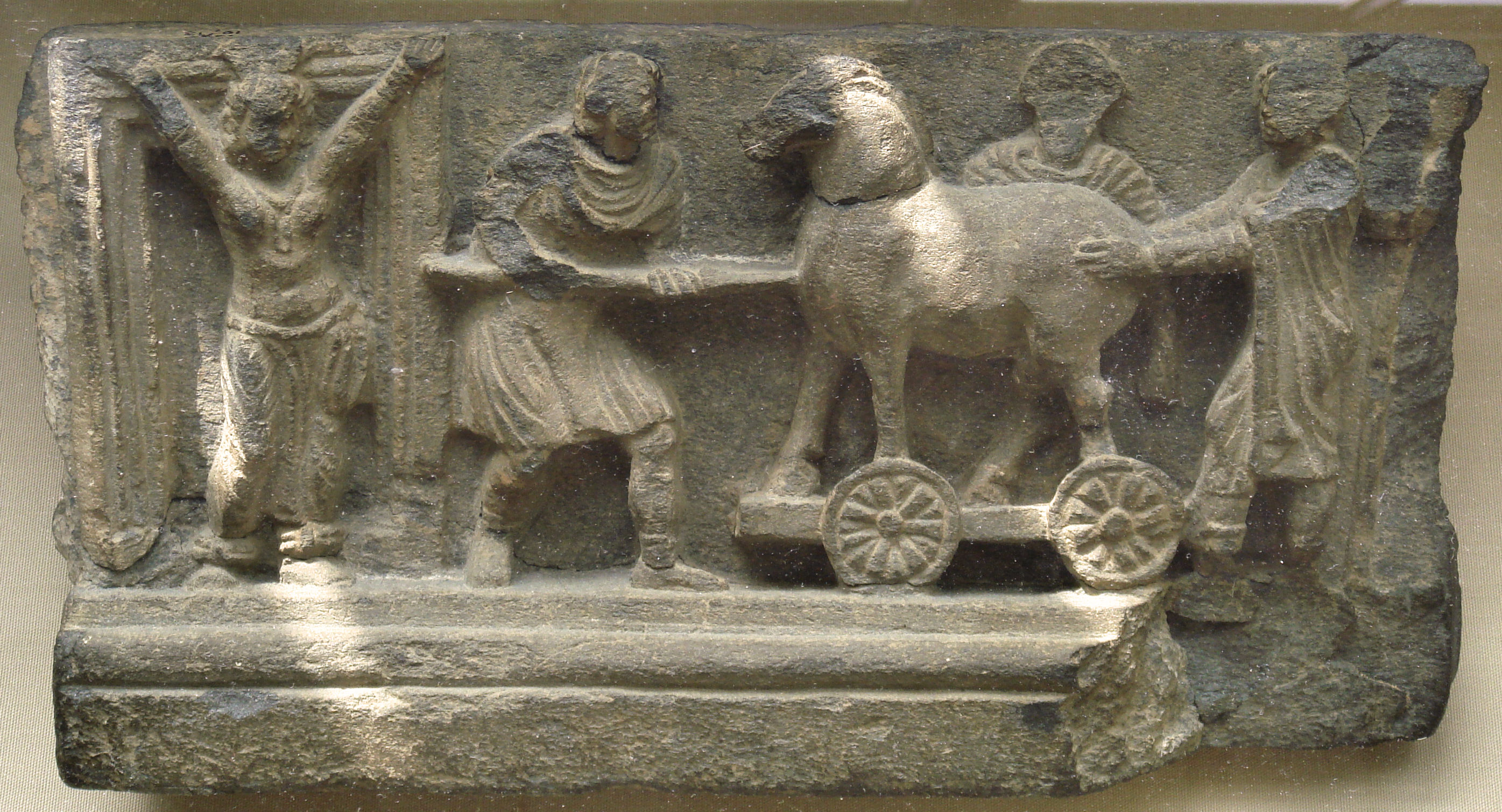
The Trojan Horse.

=== Bacchic scenes ===
Greeks harvesting grapes, Greeks drinking and revelling, scenes of erotical courtship are also numerous, and seem to relate to some of the most remarkable traits of Greek culture. These reliefs also belong to Buddhist structures, and it is sometimes suggested that they might represent some kind of paradisical world after death.

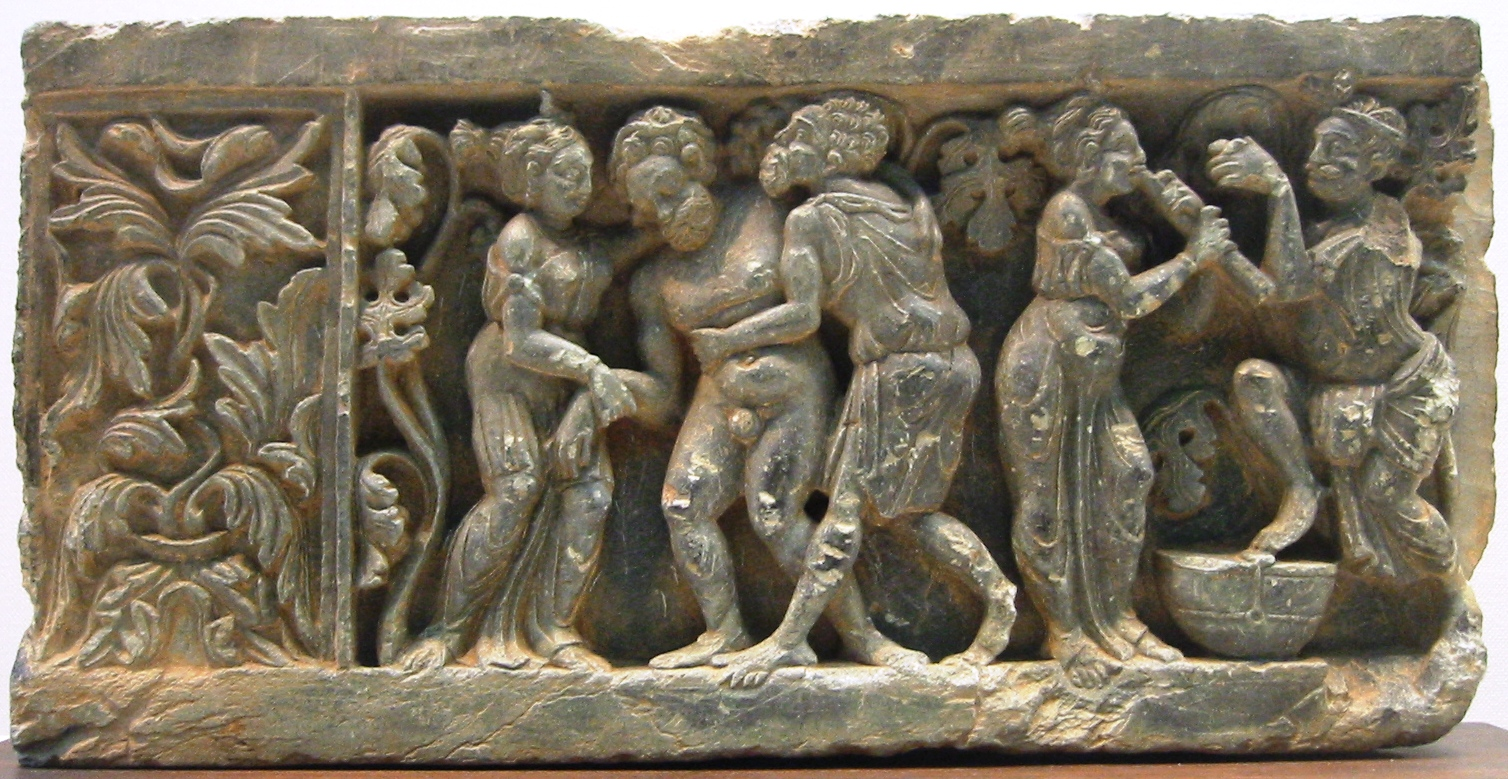
Bacchanalian scene, representing the harvest of wine grapes, Greco-Buddhist art of Gandhara, 1st-2nd century CE.

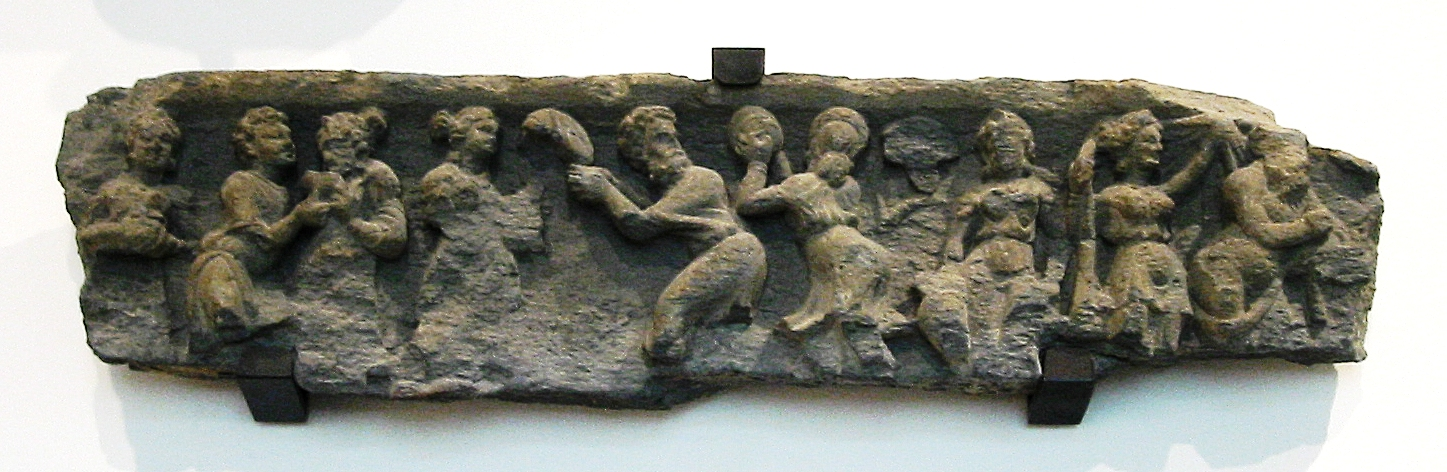
Indo-Greek bacchanalian scene, 1st-2nd century.

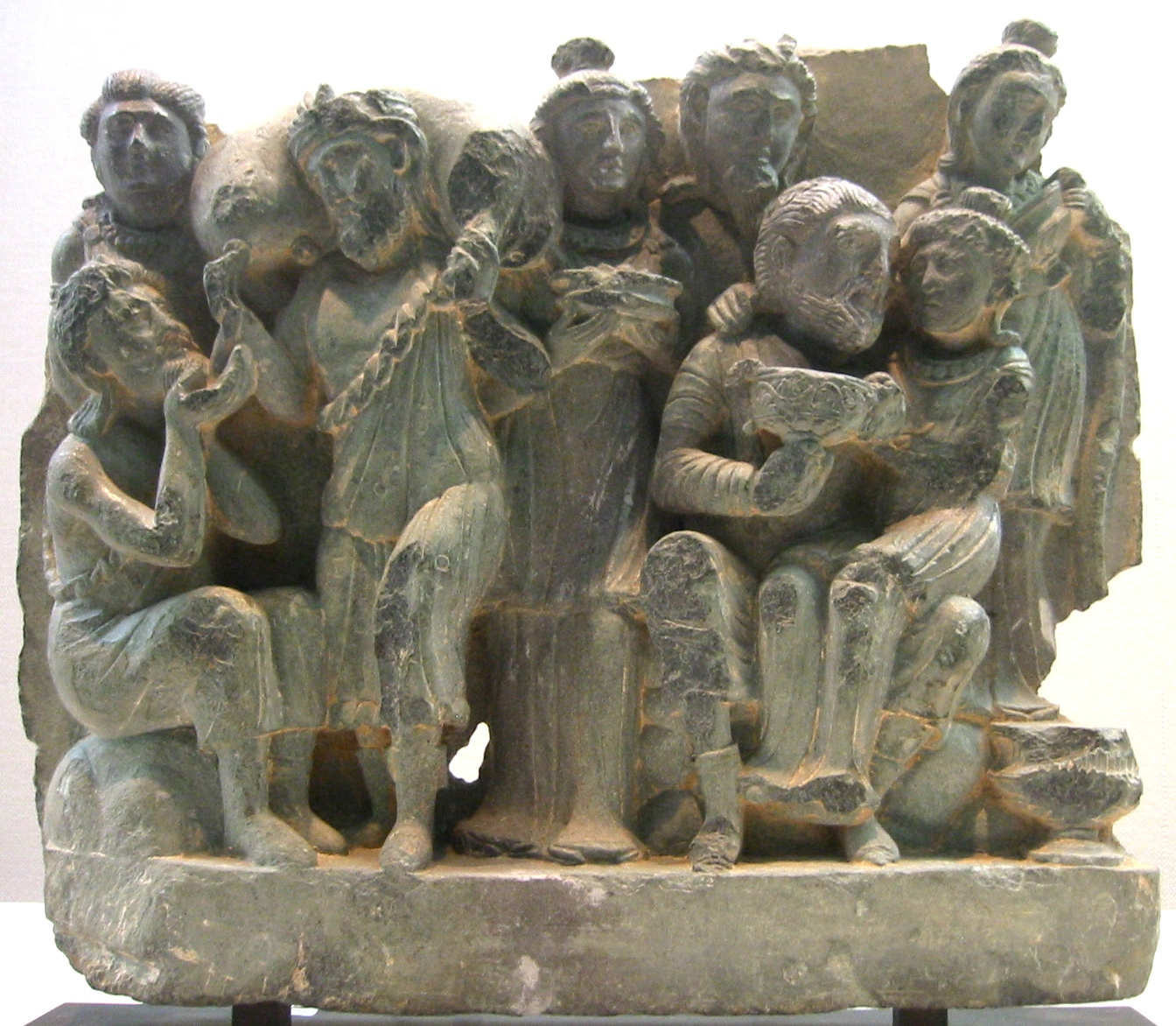
Drinking scene, with Dionysus and Ariadne on his lap, Greek drinking cups, Greek dress. Greco-Buddhist art of Gandhara. Dated 3rd century CE.

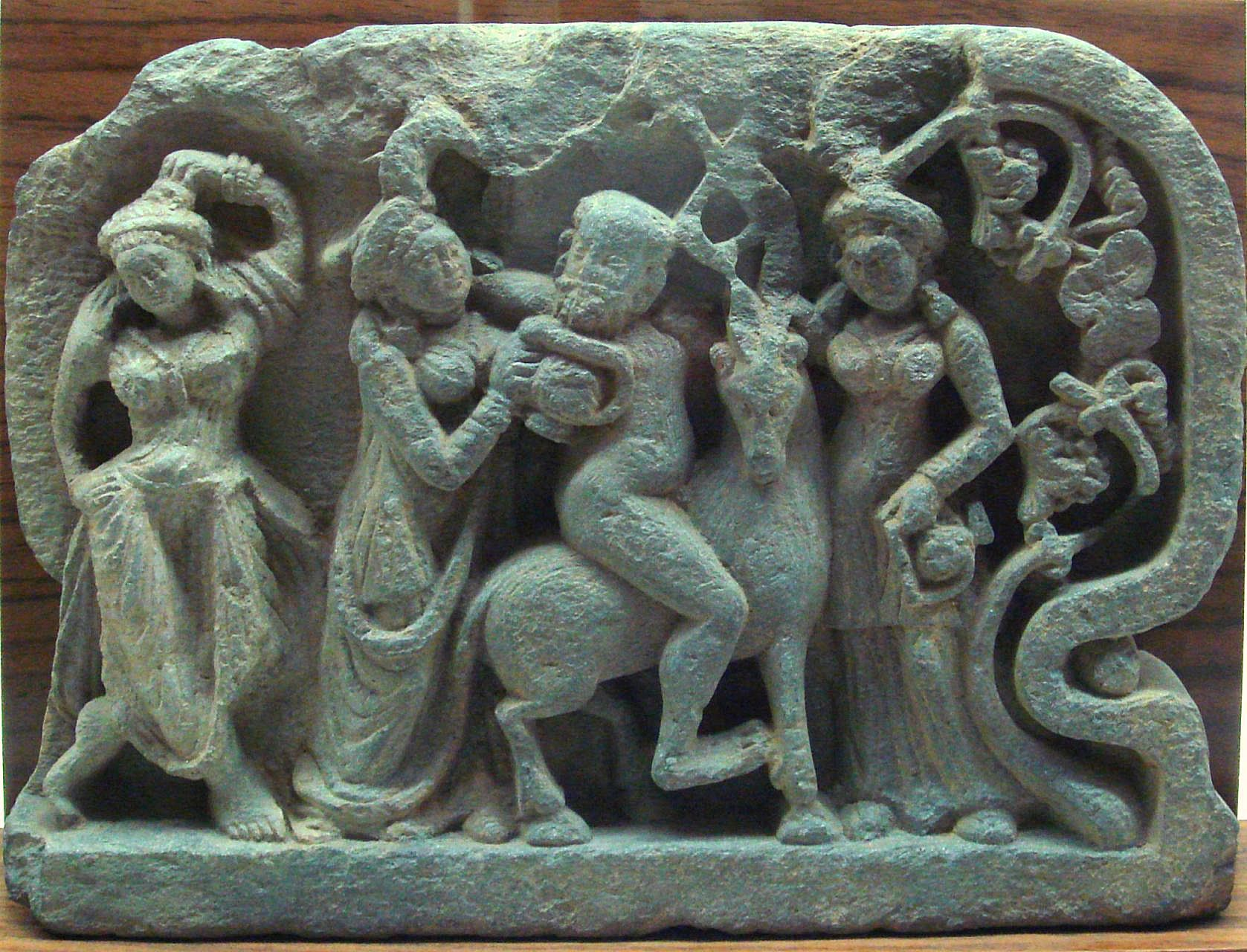
Satyr on a mountain goat, drinking with women. Gandhara, 2nd-4th century.

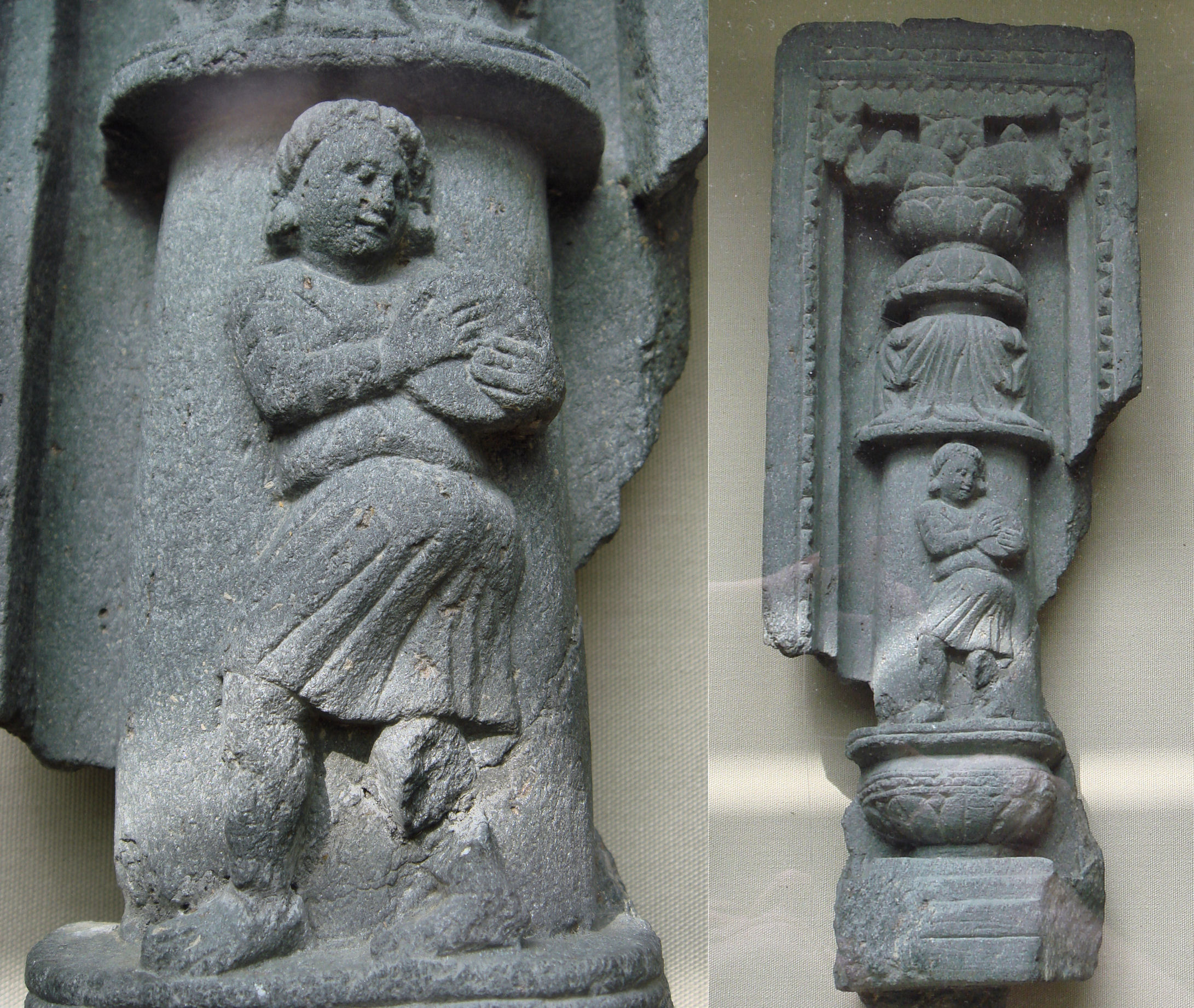
Musician wearing the chiton dress.

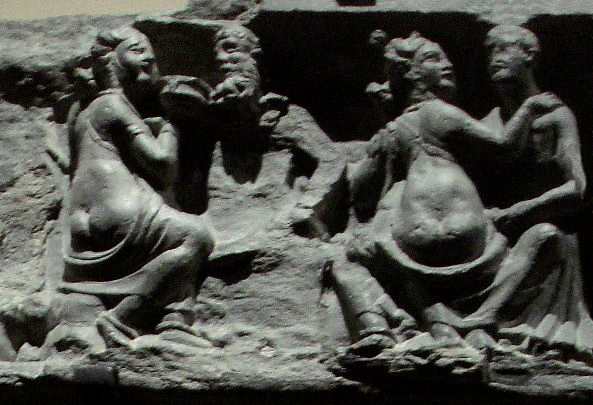
Bacchanalian scene, Gandhara.

=== Hellenistic devotees ===
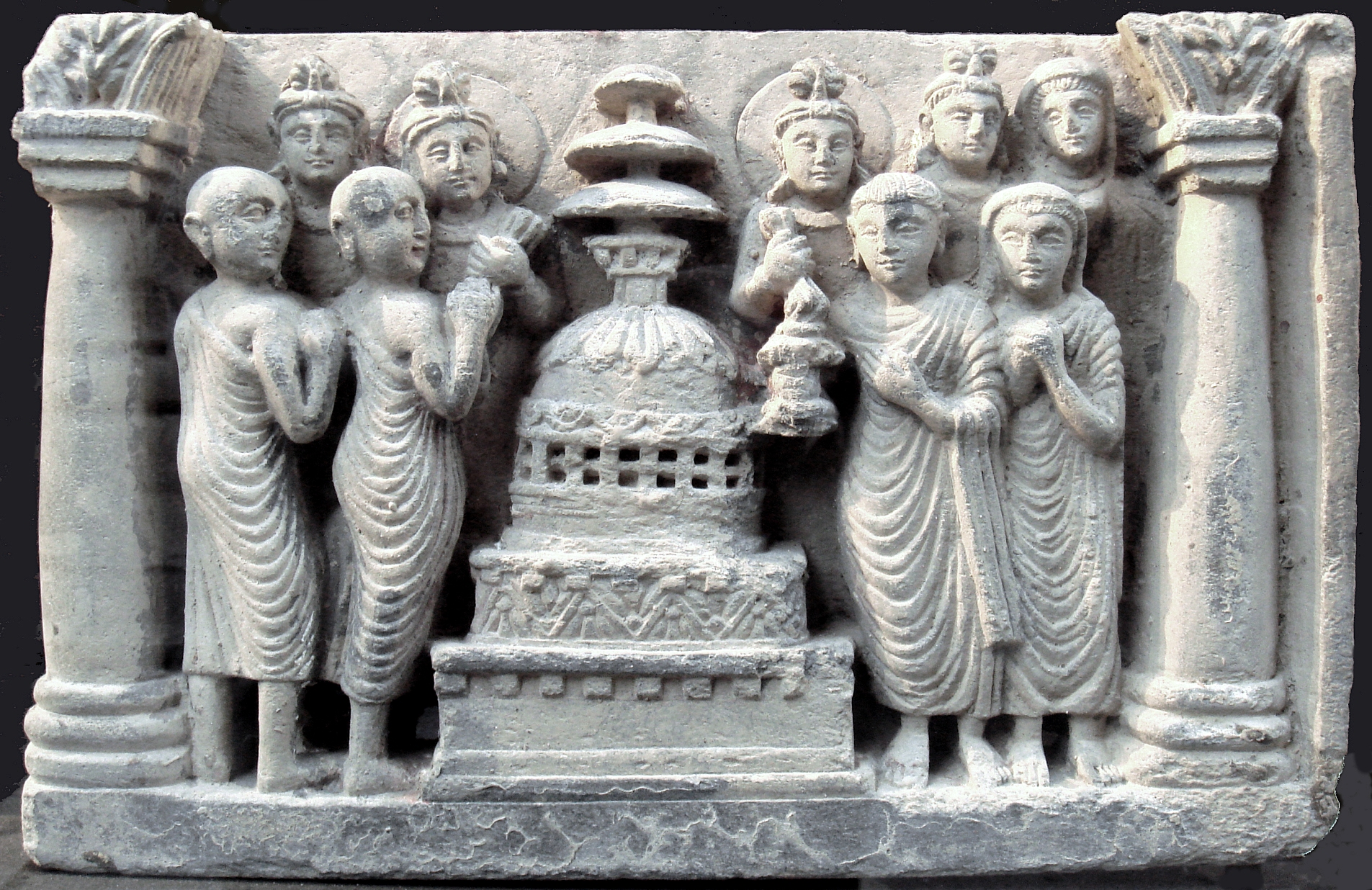
Lay devotee couple in Hellenistic dress (right, man holding a lamp), and Buddhist monks (shaven, left), circumambulating a stupa.

Depictions of people in Hellenistic dress within a Buddhist context are also numerous. Some show a Greek devotee couple circumambulating stupas together with shaven monks, others Greek protagonists are incorporated in Buddhist jataka stories of the life of the Buddha (relief of The Great Departure), others are simply depicted as devotees on the columns of Buddhist structures. A few famous friezes, including one in the British Museum, also depict the story of the Trojan horse. It is unclear whether these reliefs actually depict contemporary Greek devotees in the area of Gandhara, or if they are just part of a remaining artistic tradition. Most of these reliefs are usually dated to the 1st-3rd century CE.

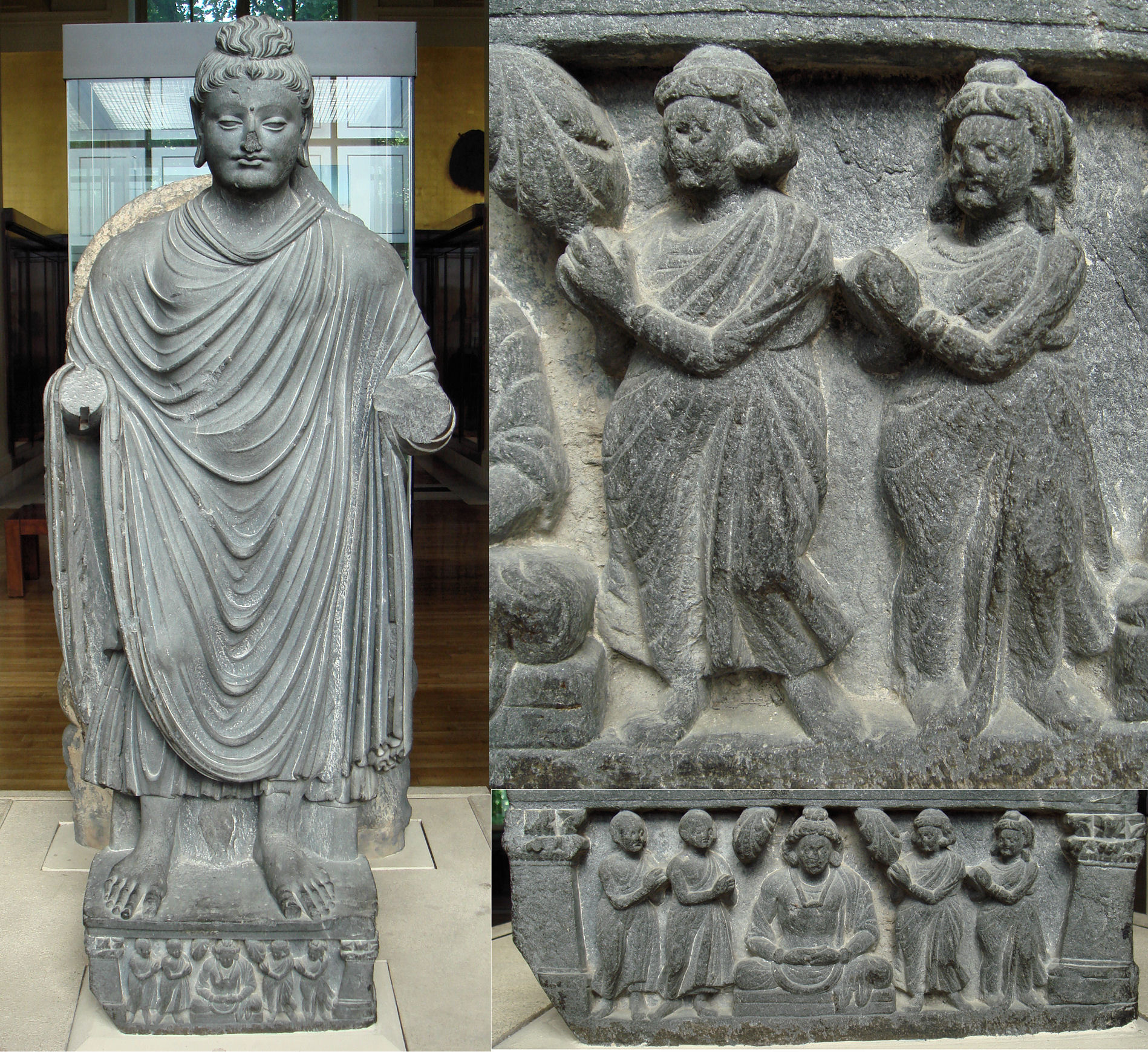
Couple of devotees in Hellenistic himation dress, at the base of a Buddha statue.

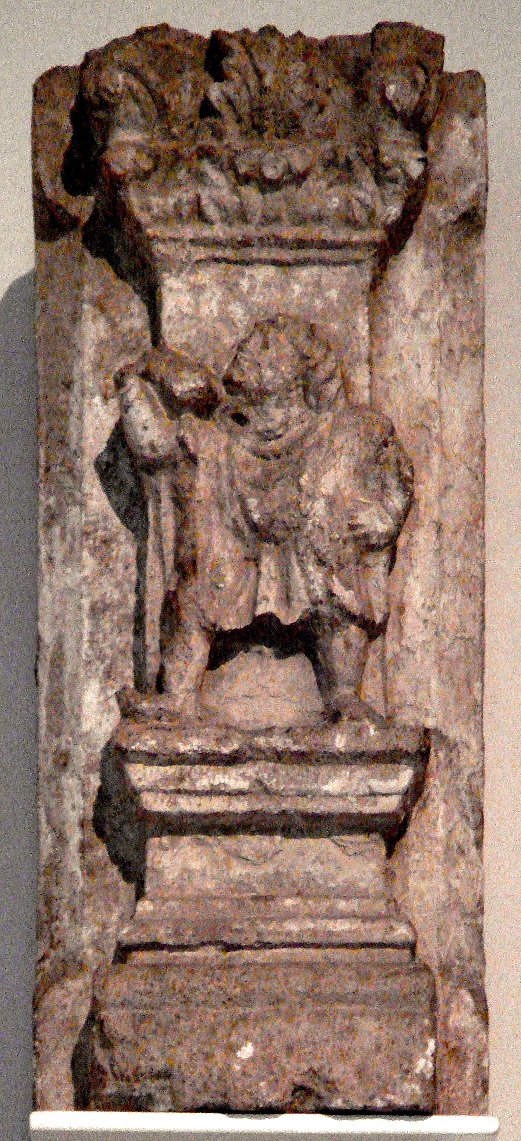
Devotee in Greek dress, on a Buddhist pilaster. Chakhil-i-Ghoundi Stupa.

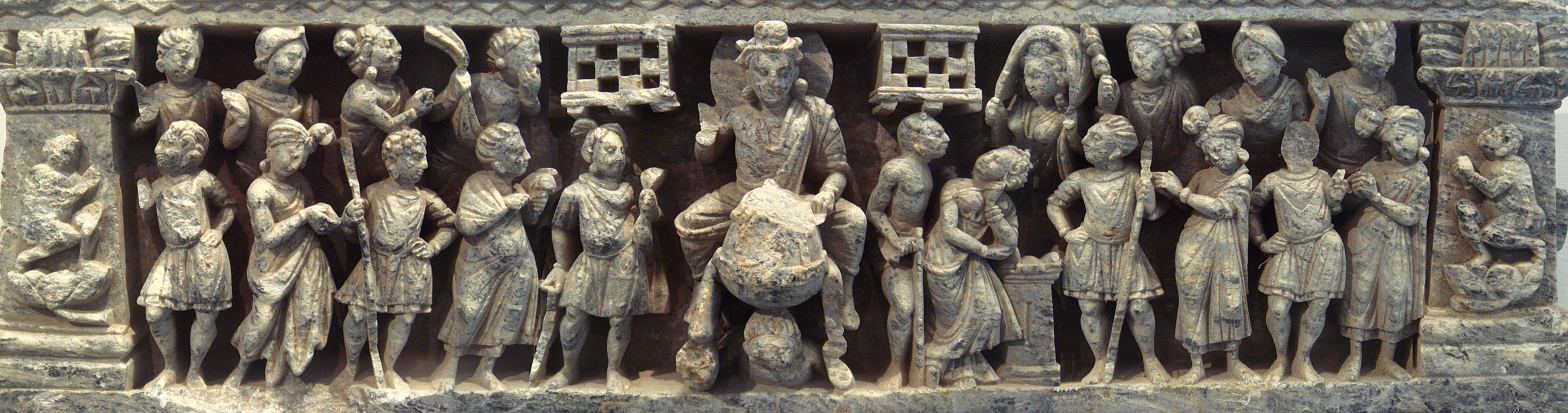
"The Great Departure", with the Buddha amid Greek deities and costumes.

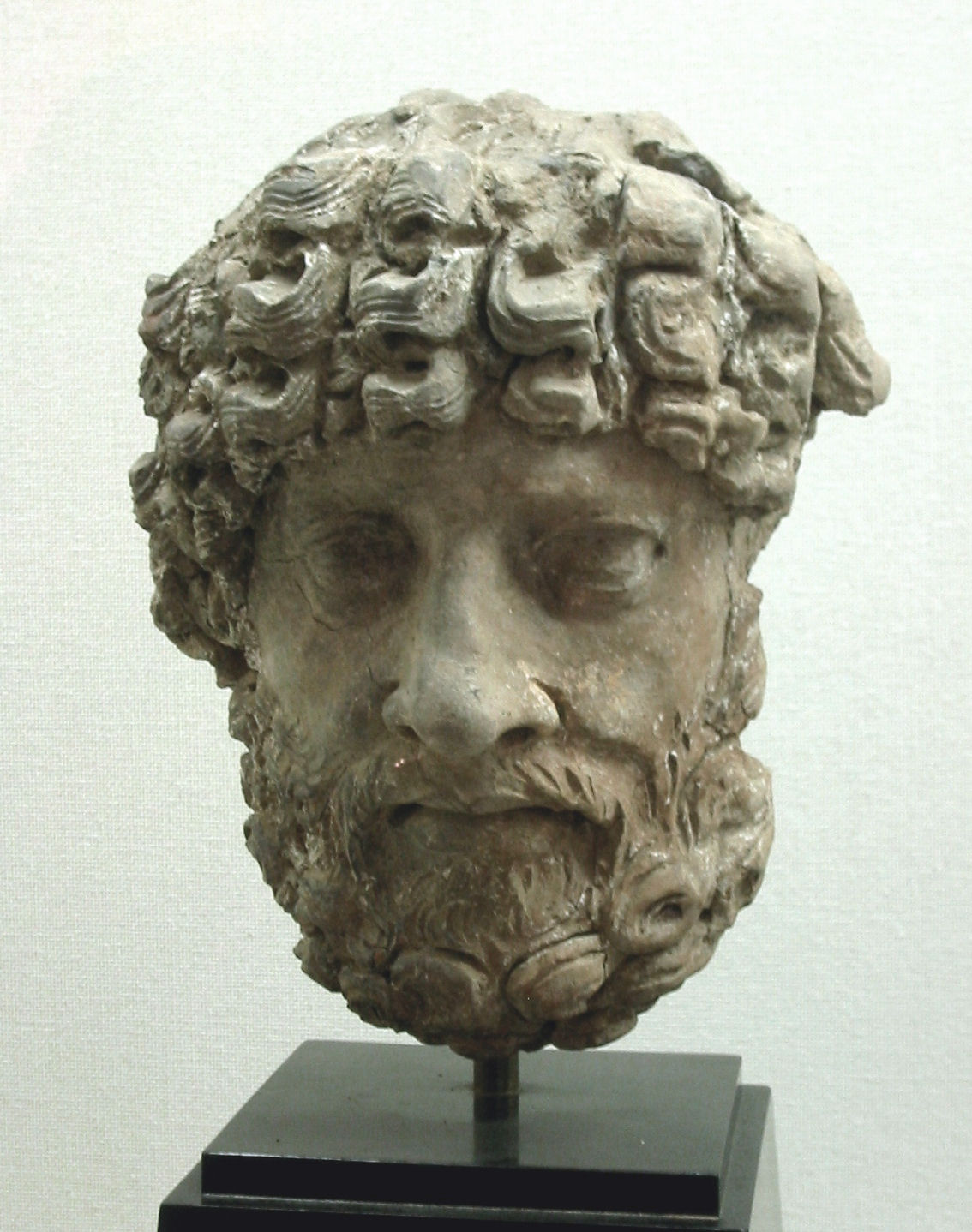
Hellenistic man or God, Gandhara.

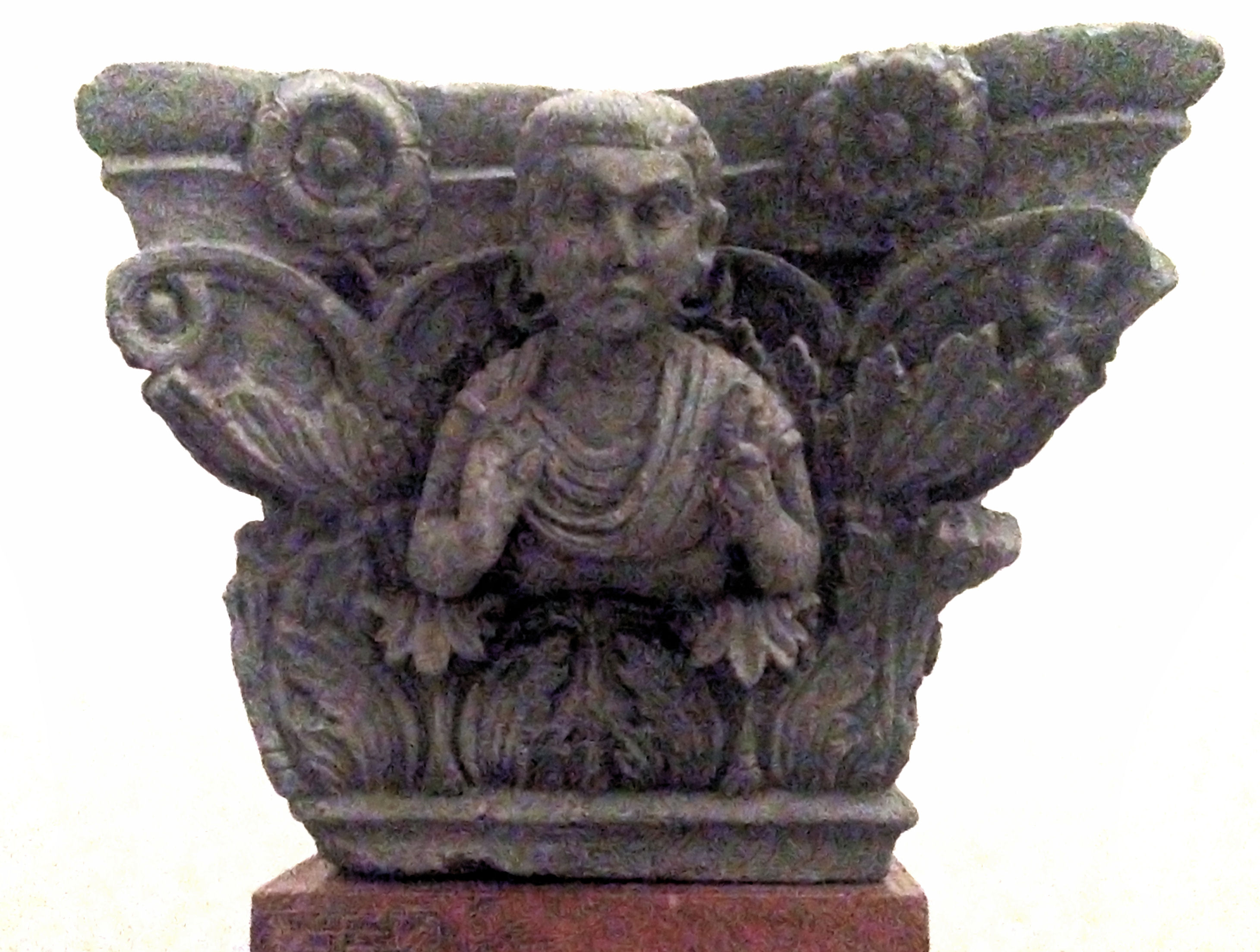
Indo-Corinthian capital representing a Buddhist devotee wearing a Greek cloak (chlamys) attached by a fibula. Dated to the 1st century BCE. Butkara Stupa.

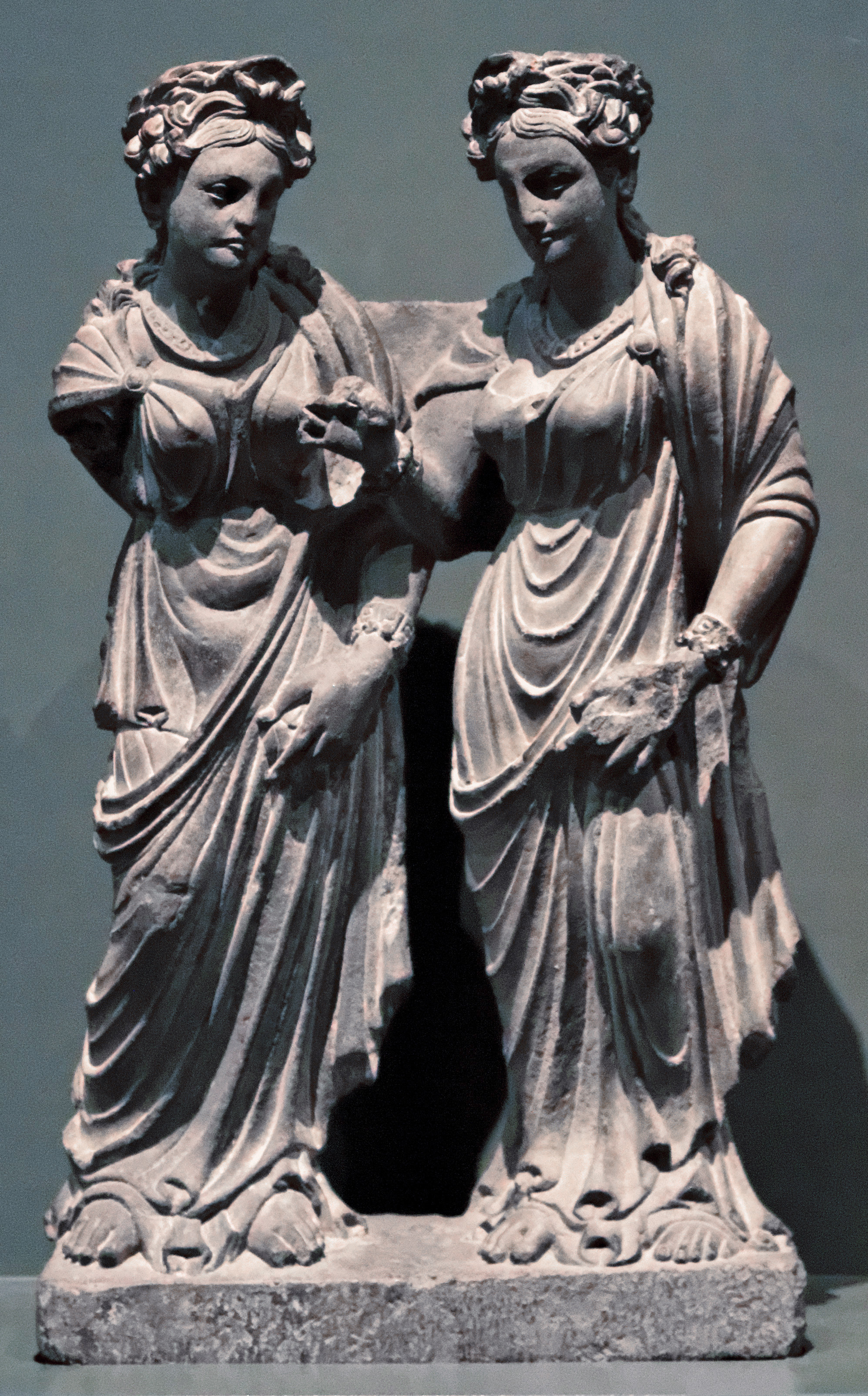
Aristocratic women, Gandhara.

== Contributions by "Yavanas" in the 1st-2nd centuries CE ==
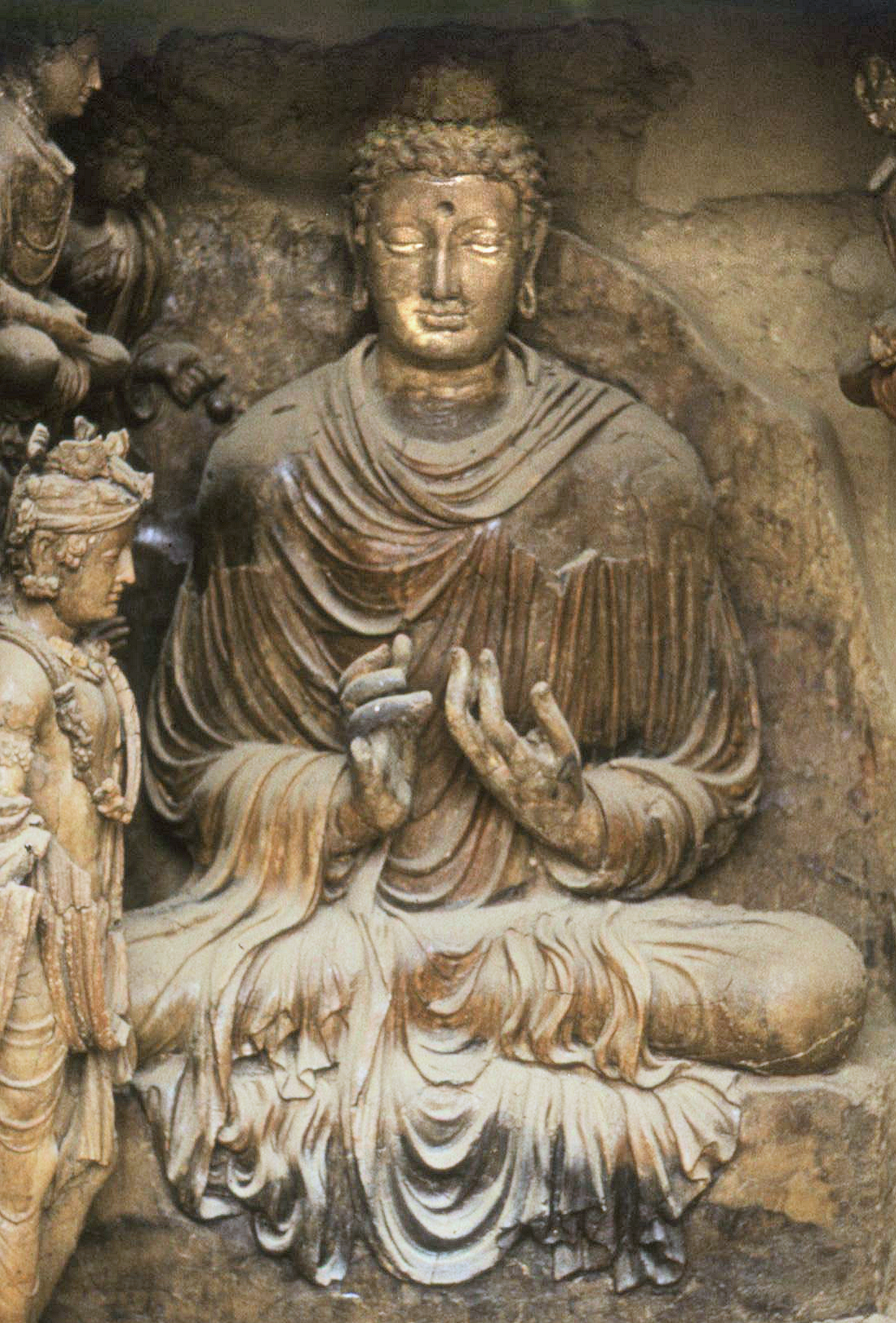
A Hellenistic seated Buddha, which may have been made by Greek artists settled in the Jalalabad region, Tapa Shotor, 2nd century CE.

After formal Greek political power waned circa 10 CE, some Greek nuclei may have continued to survive until the 2nd century AD.

=== Tapa Shotor ===
According to archaeologist Raymond Allchin, the site of Tapa Shotor near Hadda suggests that the Greco-Buddhist art of Gandhara descended directly from the art of Hellenistic Bactria, as seen in Ai-Khanoum. Archaeologist Zemaryalai Tarzi has suggested that, following the fall of the Greco-Bactrian cities of Ai-Khanoum and Takht-i Sangin, Greek populations were established in the plains of Jalalabad, which included Hadda, around the Hellenistic city of Dionysopolis, and that they were responsible for the Hellenistic Buddhist creations of Tapa Shotor in the 2nd century CE.

=== Buddhist caves ===
A large number of Buddhist caves in India, particularly in the west of the country, were artistically hewn between the 1st century BC and the 2nd century CE. Numerous donors provided the funds for the building of these caves and left donatory inscriptions, including laity, members of the clergy, government officials. Foreigners, mostly self-declared Yavanas, represented about 8% of all inscriptions.

Karla Caves

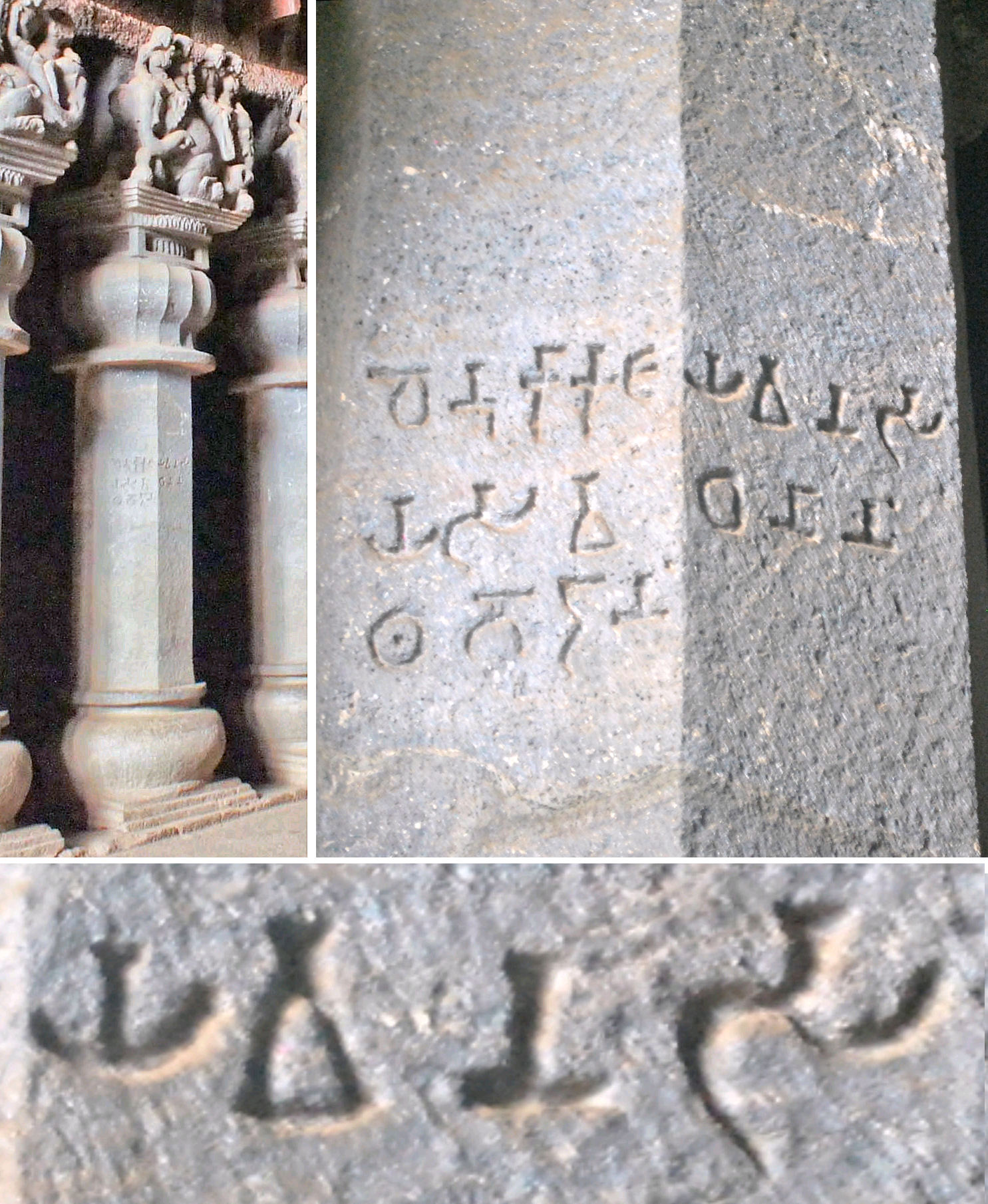
Pillar of the Great Chaitya at Karla Caves, mentioning its donation by a Yavana. Below: detail of the word "Ya-va-na-sa" in old Brahmi script:, circa AD 120.

Yavanas from the region of Nashik are mentioned as donors for six structural pillars in the Great Buddhist Chaitya of the Karla Caves built and dedicated by Western Satraps ruler Nahapana in 120 CE, although they seem to have adopted Buddhist names. In total, the Yavanas account for nearly half of the known dedicatory inscriptions on the pillars of the Great Chaitya. To this day, Nasik is known as the wine capital of India, using grapes that were probably originally imported by the Greeks.

Shivneri Caves

Two more Buddhist inscriptions by Yavanas were found in the Shivneri Caves. One of the inscriptions mentions the donation of a tank by the Yavana named Irila, while the other mentions the gift of a refectory to the Sangha by the Yavana named Cita. On this second inscription, the Buddhist symbols of the triratna and of the swastika (reversed) are positioned on both sides of the first word "Yavana(sa)".

Pandavleni Caves

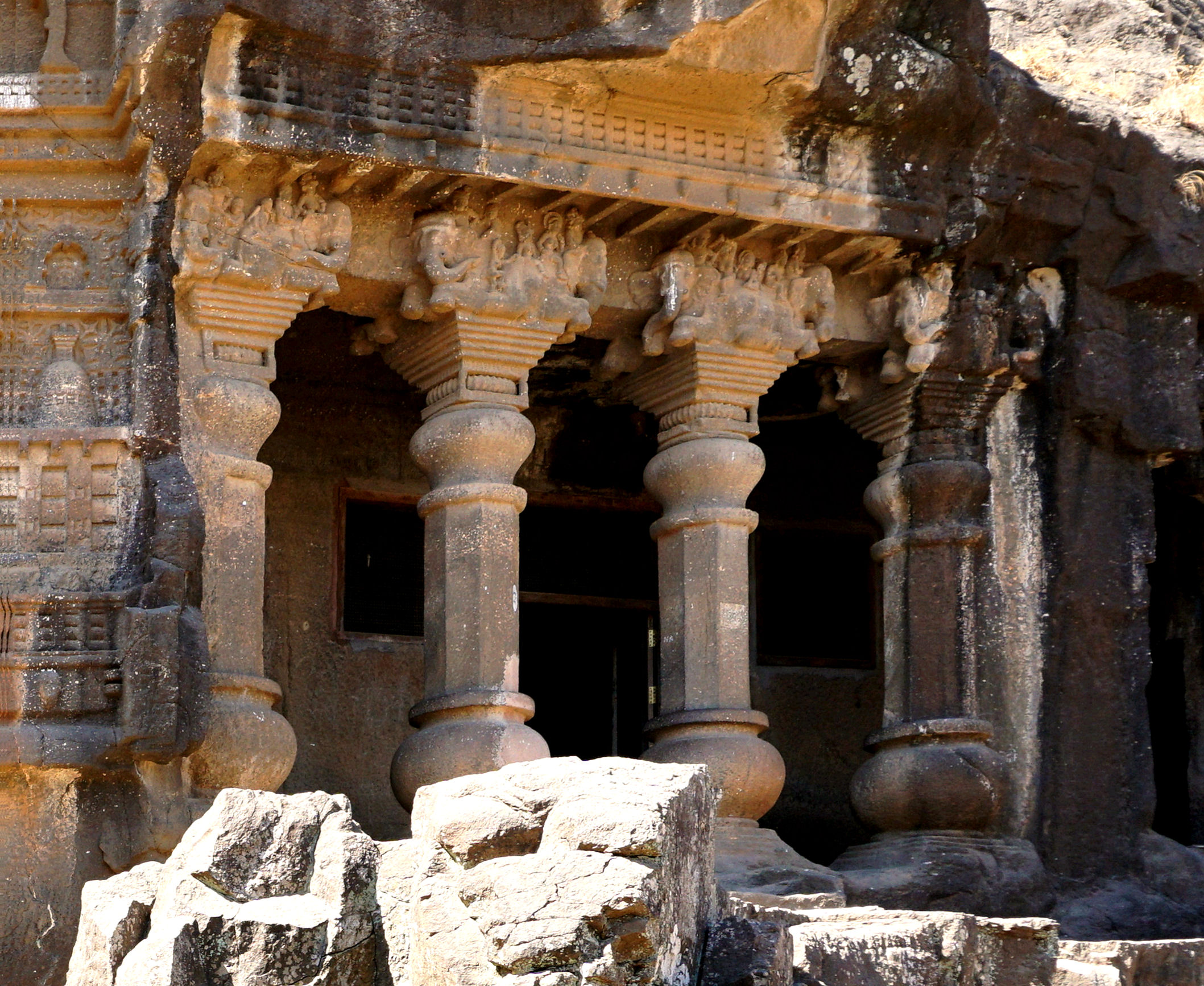
Buddhist cave built by ""Indragnidatta the son of the Yavana Dharmadeva, a northerner from Dattamittri", in the 2nd century AD", Nashik Caves.

One of the Buddhist caves (Cave No.17) in the Pandavleni Caves complex near Nashik was built and dedicated by "Indragnidatta the son of the Yavana Dharmadeva, a northerner from Dattamittri", in the 2nd century AD. The city of "Dattamittri" is thought to be the city of Demetrias in Arachosia, mentioned by Isidore of Charax.

Manmodi Caves

In the Manmodi Caves, near Junnar, an inscription by a Yavana donor appears on the façade of the main Chaitya, on the central flat surface of the lotus over the entrance: it mentions the erection of the hall-front (façade) for the Buddhist Samgha, by a Yavana donor named Chanda:

"yavanasa camdānam gabhadā[ra]"
"The meritorious gift of the façade of the (gharba) hall by the Yavana Chanda"

— Inscription on the façade of the Manmodi Chaitya.

These contributions seem to have ended when the Satavahana King Gautamiputra Satakarni claimed to have vanquished a confederacy of Yavanas (Indo-Greeks), Shakas (Western Kshatrapas), Pahlavas (Indo-Parthians) under the Western Satrap ruler Nahapana circa 130 CE. This victory is known from the fact that Gautamiputra Satakarni restruck many of Nahapana's coins, and that he is claimed to have defeated the Yavanas and their confederates in the inscription of his mother Queen Gotami Balasiri at Cave No. 3 of the Nasik Caves:

...Siri-Satakani Gotamiputa (....) who crushed down the pride and conceit of the Kshatriyas; who destroyed the Sakas, Yavanas and Palhavas; who rooted out the Khakharata race; who restored the glory of the Satavahana family...

— Nasik Caves inscription of Queen Gotami Balasiri, circa AD 170, Cave No.3

== See also ==
- Greco-Bactrian Kingdom
- Seleucid Empire
- Greco-Buddhism
- Indo-Scythian art
- Indo-Parthian kingdom
- Kushan art
- Timeline of Indo-Greek kingdoms
