= Agnipani =

Yaksha deity

"Agnipani" Yaksha
Mathura, 100 BCE
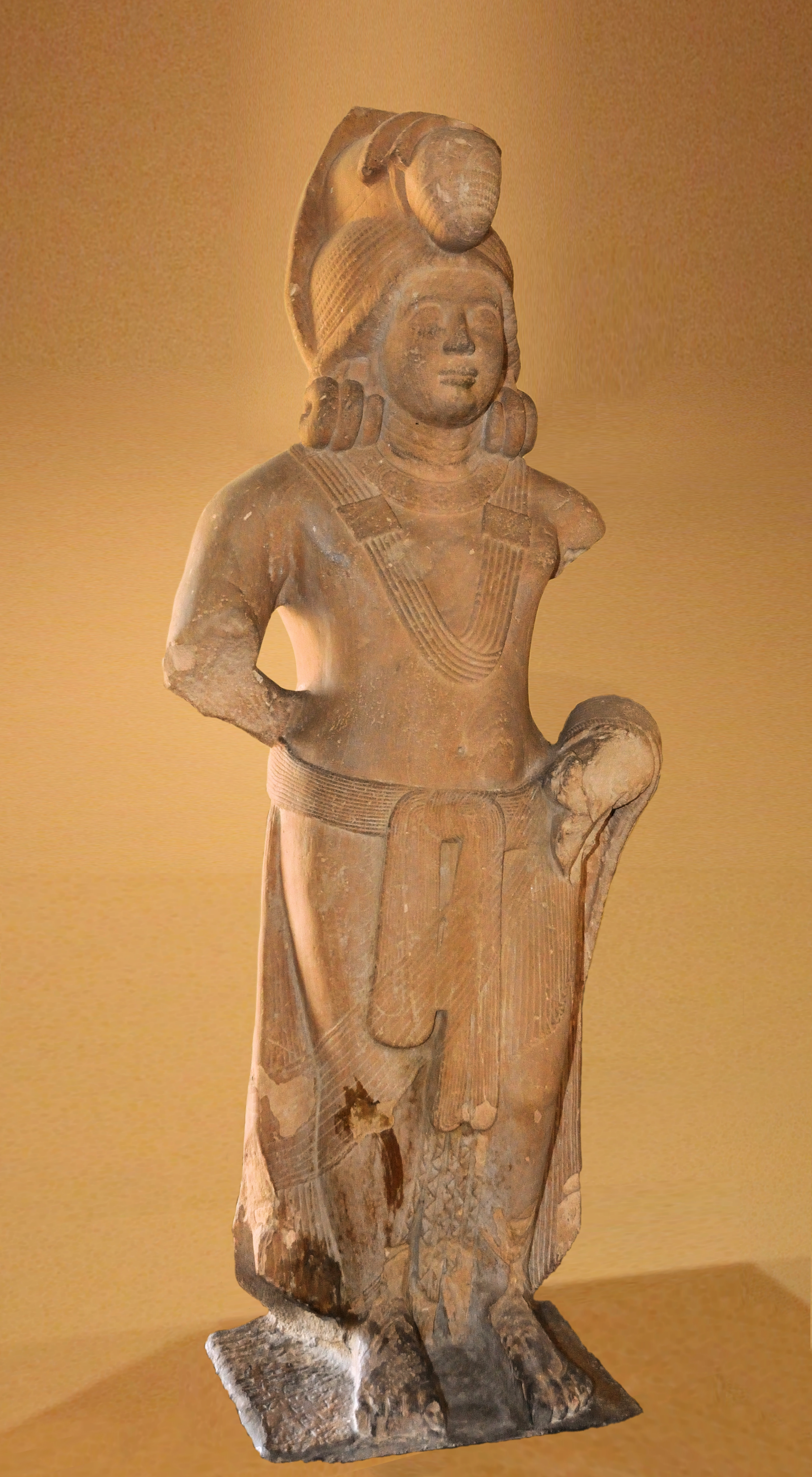
"Agnipani" Yaksha ("Fire-holder"), 100 BCE Mathura Museum, GMM 87.146

Agnipani was a Yaksha deity in ancient India. His name means "Agni-holder", "Agni" being the fire, for which the later god Agni is well known. The Mathura Museum describes his statue as "Agnipani Yaksha", but Sonya Rhie Quintanilla simply identifies the statue as that of the Vedic God Agni.

== A Yaksha ==
Yakshas seem to have been the object of an important cult in the early periods of Indian history, many of them being known such as Kubera, king of the Yakshas, Manibhadra or Mudgarpani. The Yakshas are a broad class of nature-spirits, usually benevolent, but sometimes mischievous or capricious, connected with water, fertility, trees, the forest, treasure and wilderness, and were the object of popular worship. Many of them were later incorporated into Buddhism, Jainism or Hinduism.

== Sculptures ==
Some of the earliest works of art of the Mathura school of art are the Yakshas, monumental sculptures of earth divinities that have been dated to the 2nd-1st century BCE. Yakshas became the focus of the creation of colossal cultic images, typically around 2 meters or more in height, which are considered as probably the first Indian anthropomorphic productions in stone. Although few ancient Yaksha statues remain in good condition, the vigor of the style has been applauded, and expresses essentially Indian qualities. They are often pot-bellied, two-armed and fierce-looking. The Yashas are often depicted with weapons or attributes, such as the Yaksha Mudgarpani.

=== Agnipani ("Fire-holder") Yaksha from Bharana Kalan ===
A statue of Agnipani ("Fire-holder") Yaksha from BharanaKalan, visible in the Mathura Museum, is dated to circa 100 BCE. It was discovered in Bharana Kalan, 32 kilometers northwest of Mathura. In the statue, Agni has a flame-shaped "aureole" with incised tongues of flames behind his turbanned head, and he hold a water flask in the left hand, some fragments of which remain. His right hand may have been held out in "Abhaya mudra", as also seen in other statues of Agni.

The inscription in Brahmi script on the base of the statue is in very bad condition, but has been partly deciphered. Some parallels with the contemporary Mudgarpani statue, probably manufactured and dedicated by the same person, also helped interpretation:

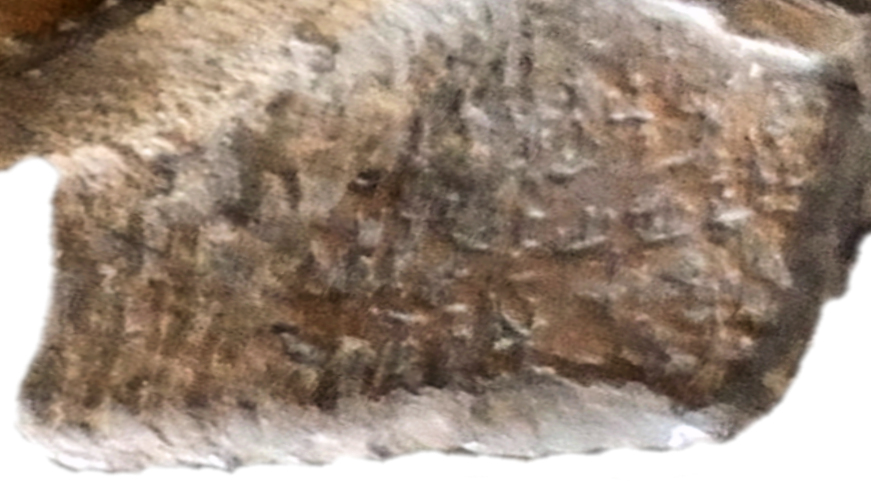
Agnipani pedestal inscription (right side).

Right side:
(a)[m](a)ty[e]na pratihāre-
[na]....jayaghoṣena
[bh](aga)[v](a)to ā[gn]isa pra[t]i[m](ā)
Left side:
[ka]ritā p[rī]yaṃtāṃ[a]ga[ya]

"An image of the Holy One Agni was caused to be made by Jayghosa, the minister in charge of the gate-keepers (?)

May Agni be pleased!"

"Agnipani" Yaksha

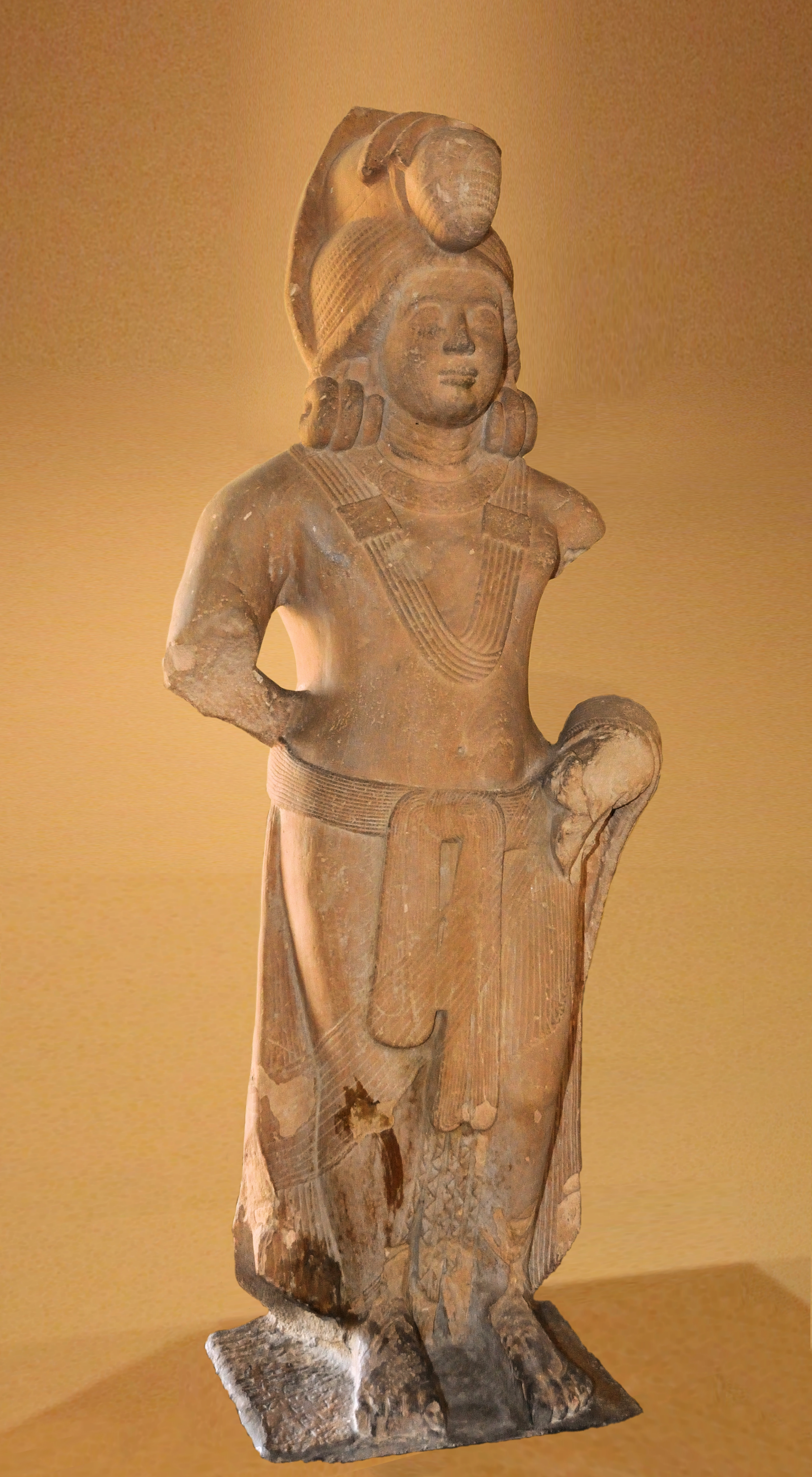
Front

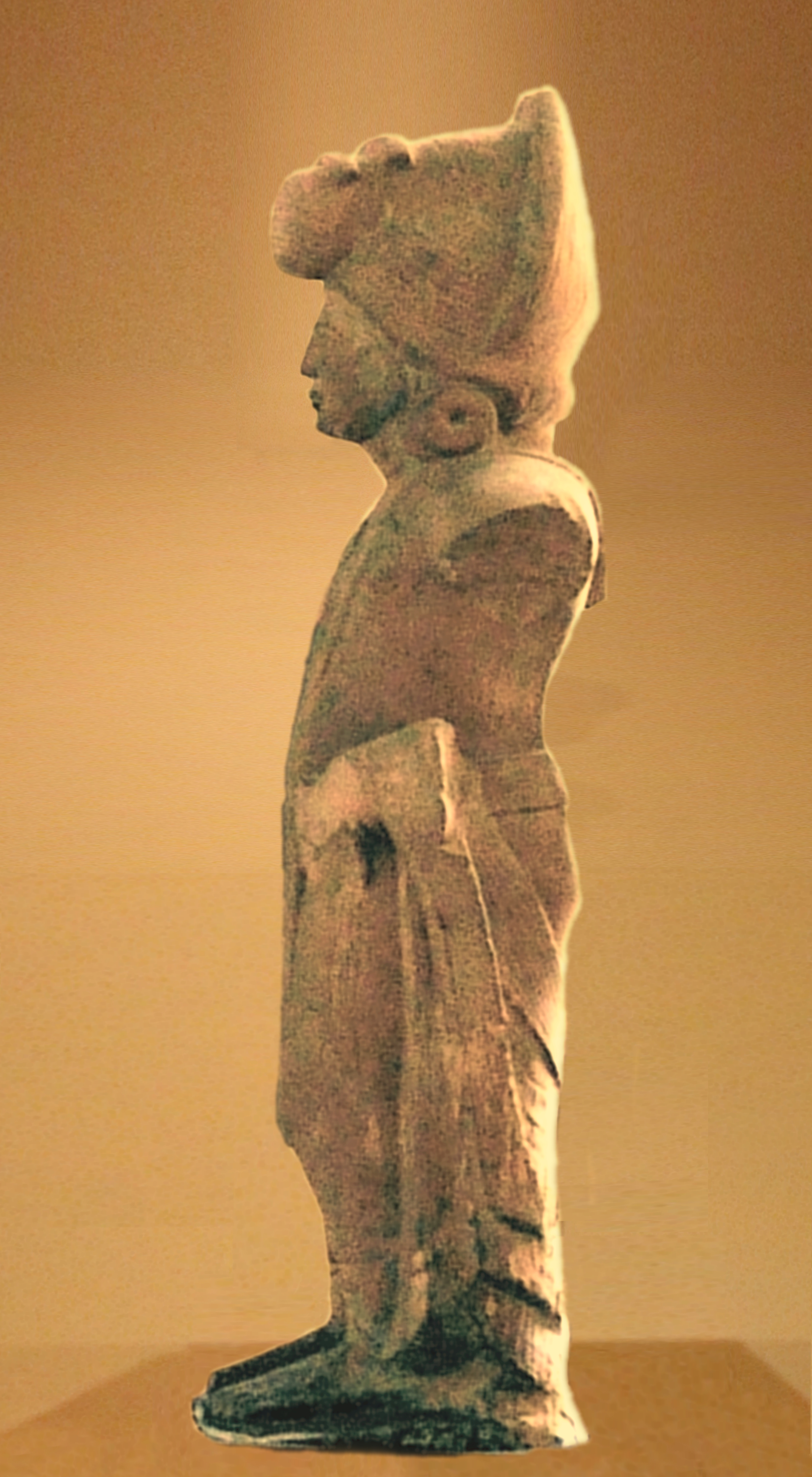
Side

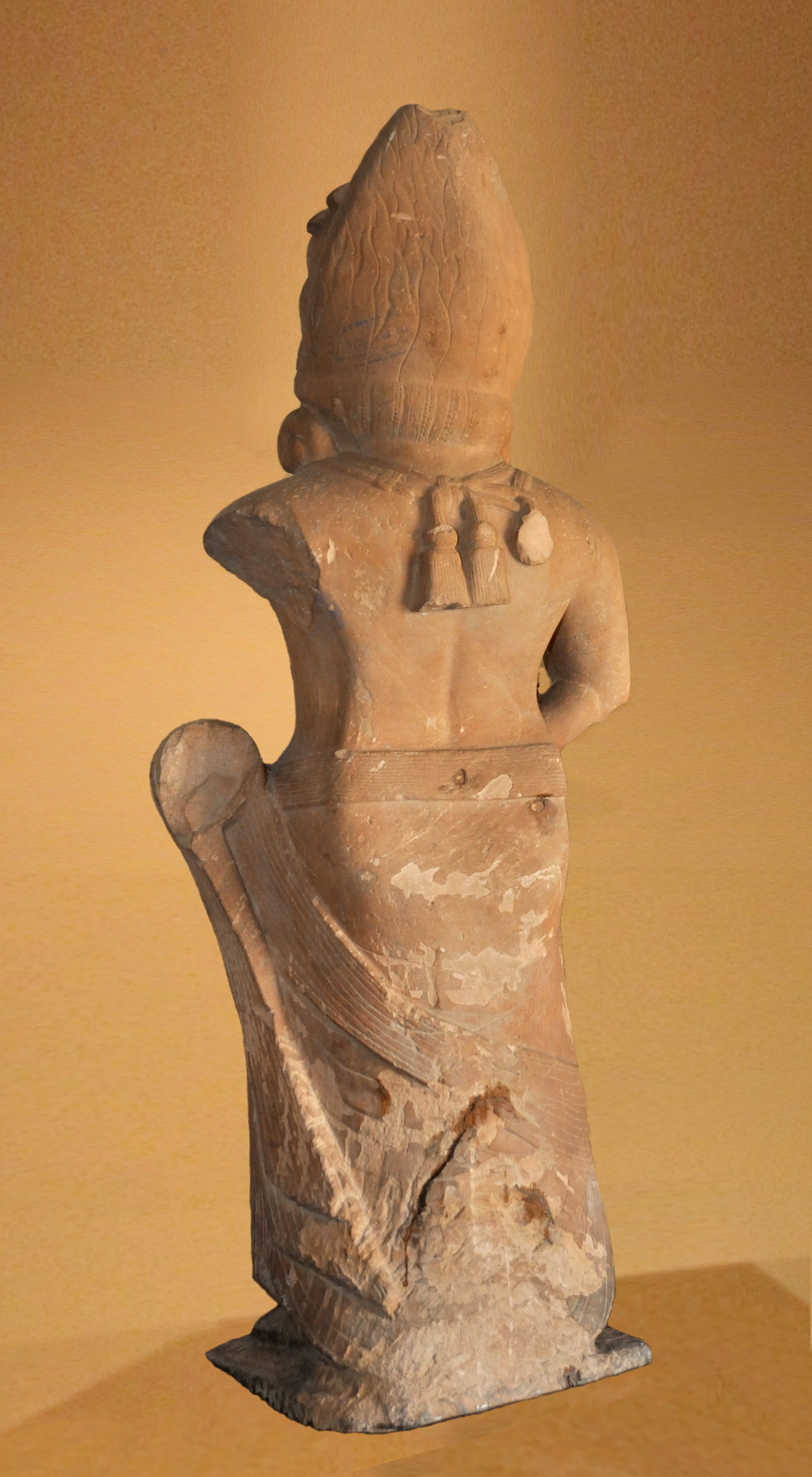
Back

"Agnipani" Yaksha ("Fire-holder"), 100 BCE Mathura Museum, GMM 87.146

=== Style ===
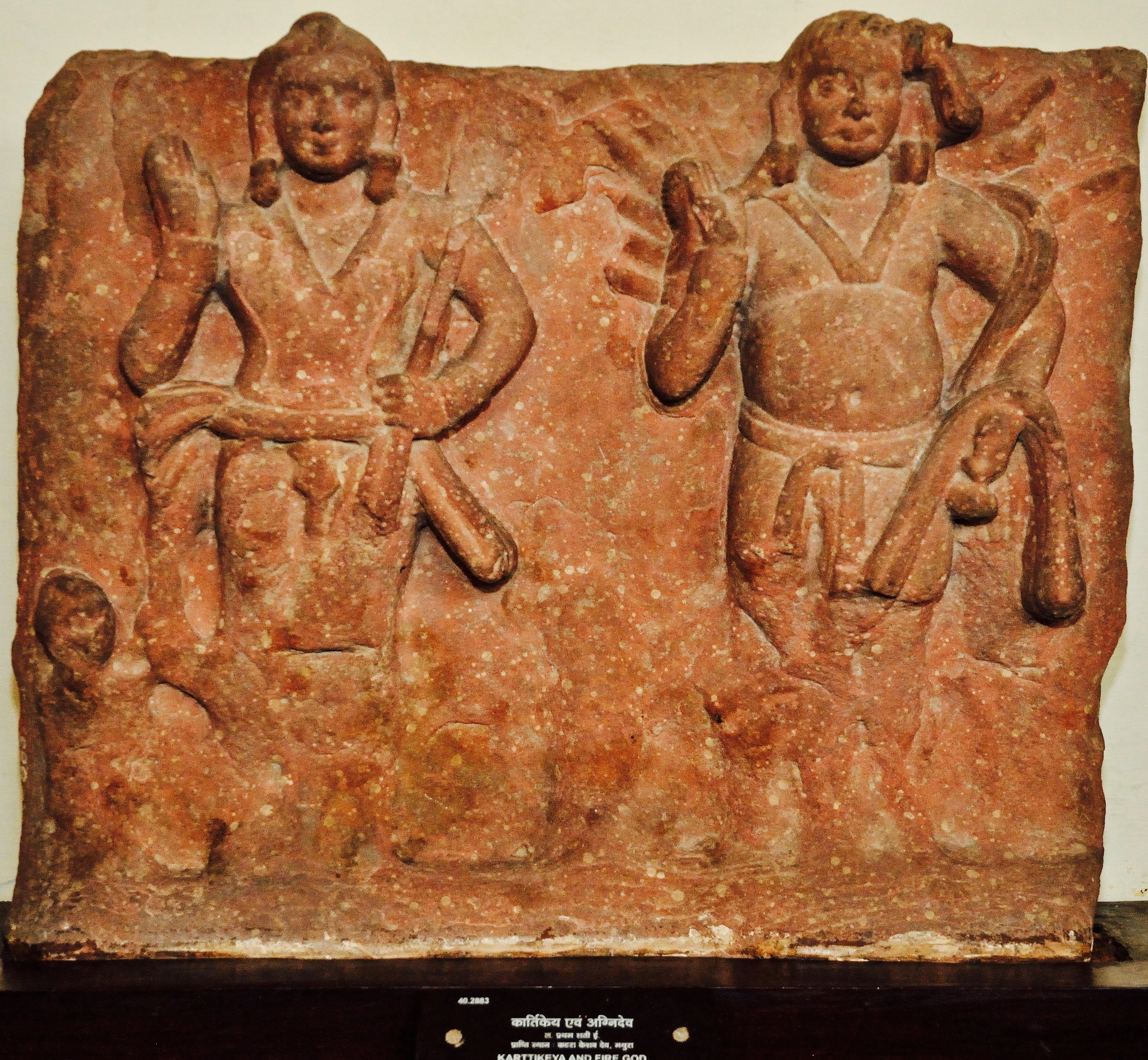
A later relief from the 1st century CE, showing Agni (right) with water pot and left hand in Abhaya mudra. He appears with his son Skanda (Karttikeya) on the left.

It is often suggested that the style of the colossal Yaksha statuary had an important influence on the creation of later divine images and human figures in India. The female equivalent of the Yashas were the Yashinis, often associated with trees and children, and whose voluptuous figures became omnipresent in Indian art. A relief is also known from the Mathura Museum, which shown the Mudgarpani with the same attributes.

Some Hellenistic influence, such as the geometrical folds of the drapery or the walking stance of the statues, has been suggested. According to John Boardman, the hem of the dress in the monumental early Yaksha statues is derived from Greek art. Describing the drapery of one of these statues, John Boardman writes: "It has no local antecedents and looks most like a Greek Late Archaic mannerism", and suggests it is possibly derived from the Hellenistic art of nearby Bactria where this design is known. Under the Indo-Greeks, the cult of the Yakshas may also have been associated with the Bacchic cult of Dionysos.

In the production of colossal Yaksha statues carved in the round, which can be found in several locations in northern India, the art of Mathura is considered as the most advanced in quality and quantity during this period.

== Examples ==
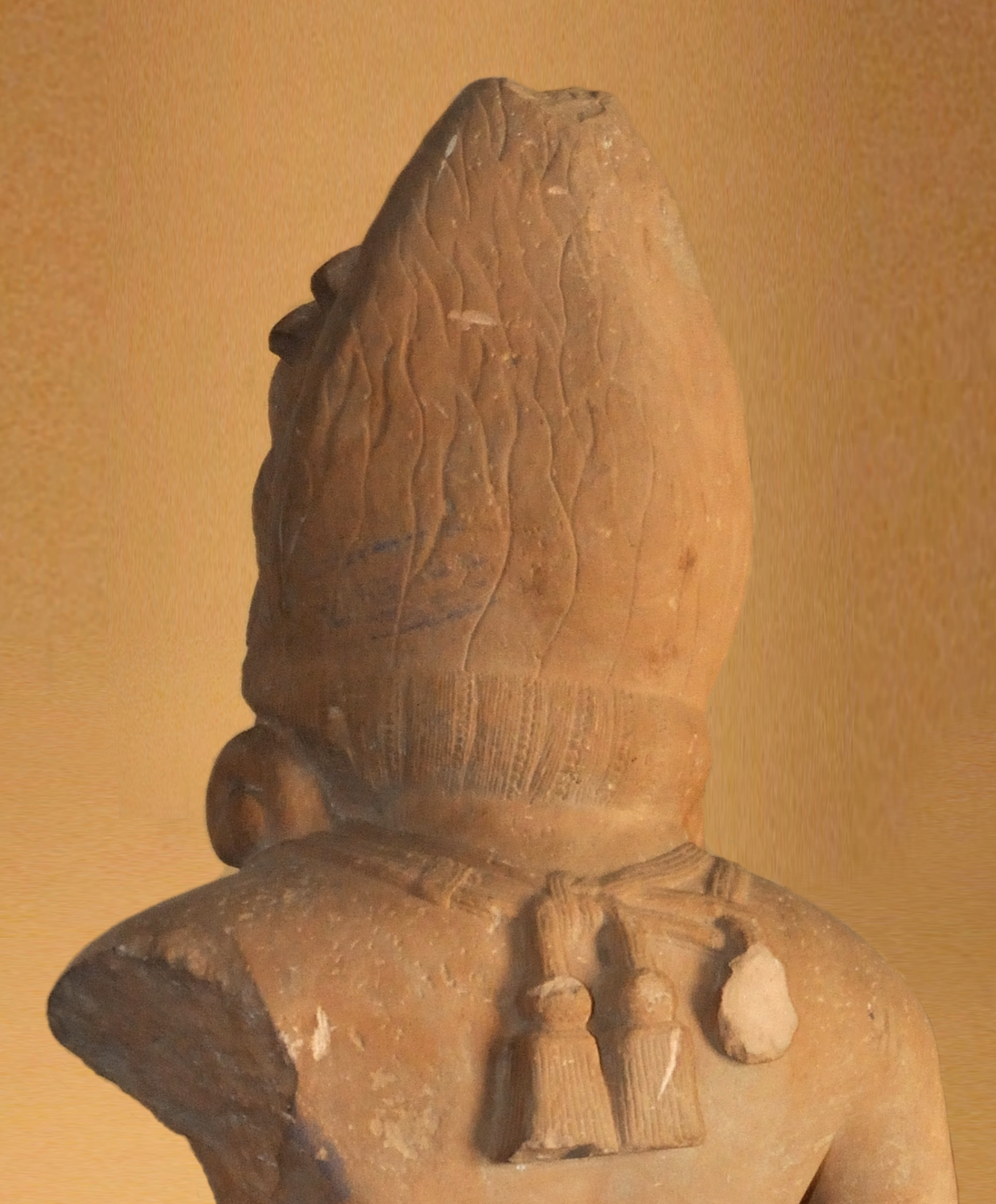
Aureole with tongues of flames (back view)

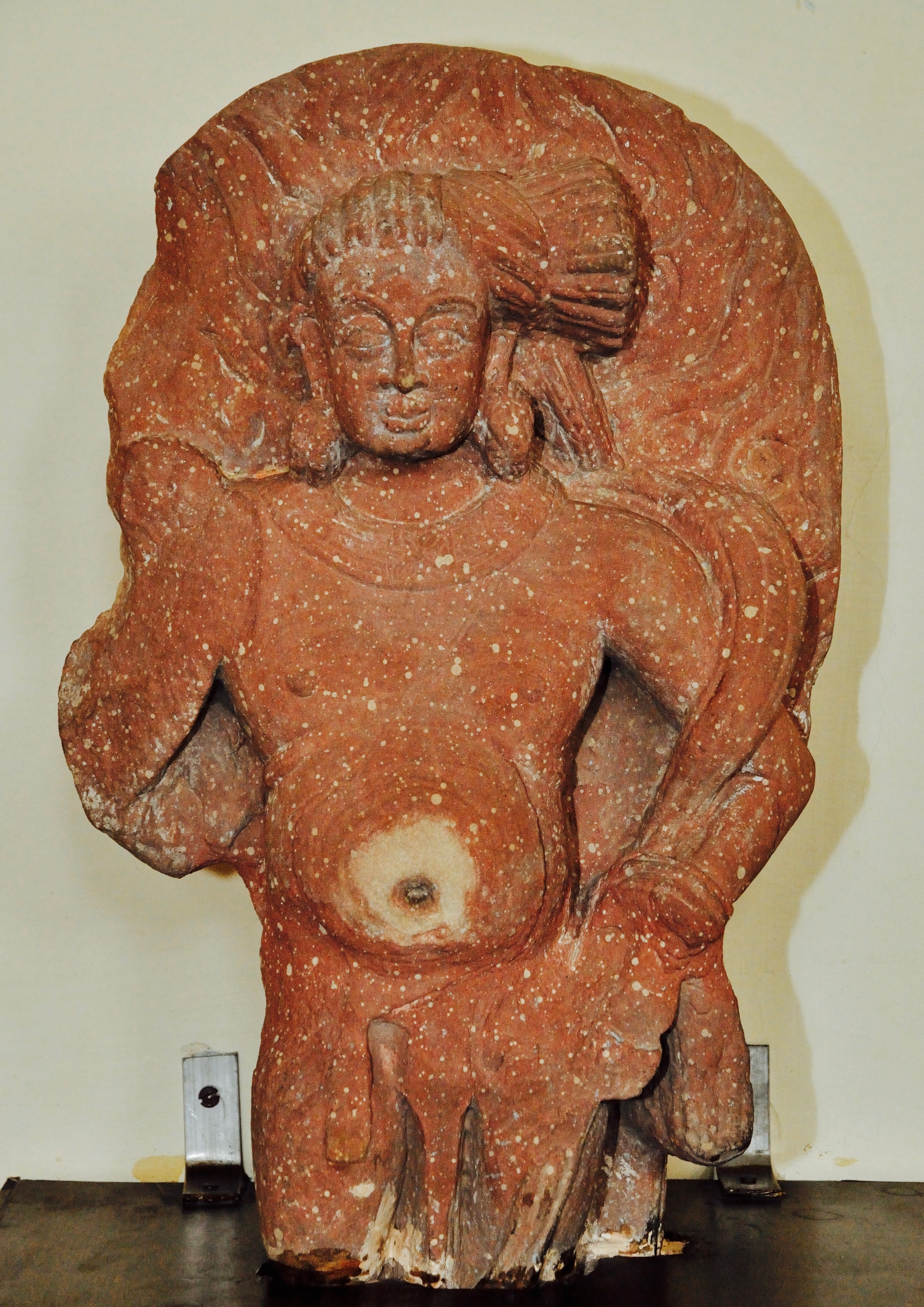
A Kushan Empire-era Agni statue
