= Government Museum, Mathura =

Museum in India

Coordinates: 27.4928°N 77.6806°E

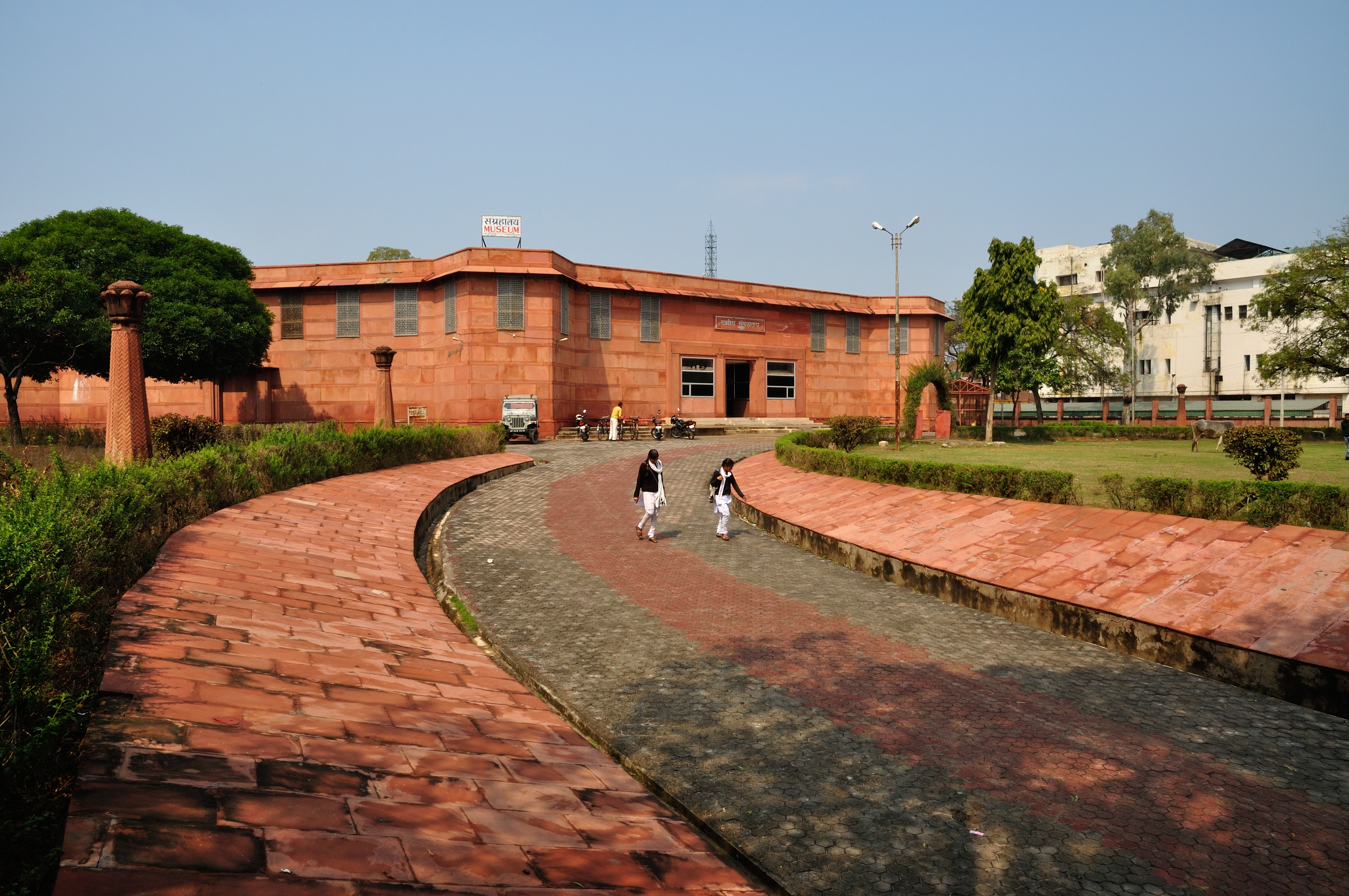
- Front view of the Museum in Mathura
- Established: 1874
- Location: Mathura
- Key holdings: Mudgarpani Agnipani; Parkham Yaksha; Mathura Herakles; Isapur Yūpa; Saptarishi Tila statue Bhutesvara Yakshis
- Founder: Frederic Growse
- Director: Shiv Prashad Singh

Government Museum, Mathura, commonly referred to as Mathura museum, is an archaeological museum in Mathura city of Uttar Pradesh state in India. The museum was founded by then collector of the Mathura district, Sir F. S. Growse in 1874. Initially, it was known as Curzon Museum of Archaeology, then Archaeology Museum, Mathura, and finally changed to the Government Museum, Mathura.

== Overview ==
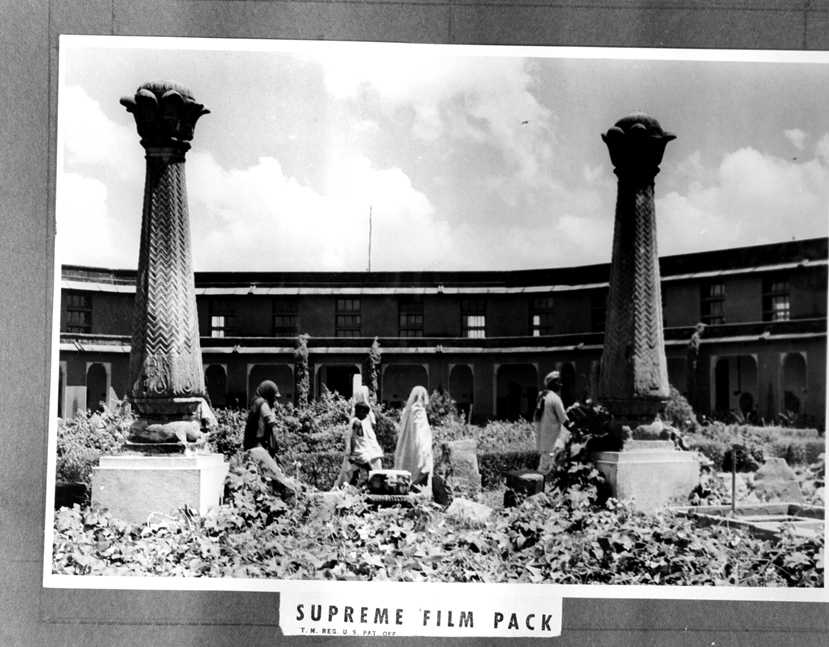
The museum in 1949

The museum houses artifacts pottery, sculptures, paintings, and coins primarily from in and around Mathura, plus discoveries made by noted colonial archaeologists like Alexander Cunningham, F. S. Growse, and Fuhrer. The museum is famous for ancient sculptures of the Mathura school dating from 3rd century BC to 12th century AD., during Kushan Empire and Gupta Empire. today it is one of the leading museums of Uttar Pradesh.

The Government of India issued a postage stamp on 9 October 1974 on the centenary of the museum.

== Notable collections ==
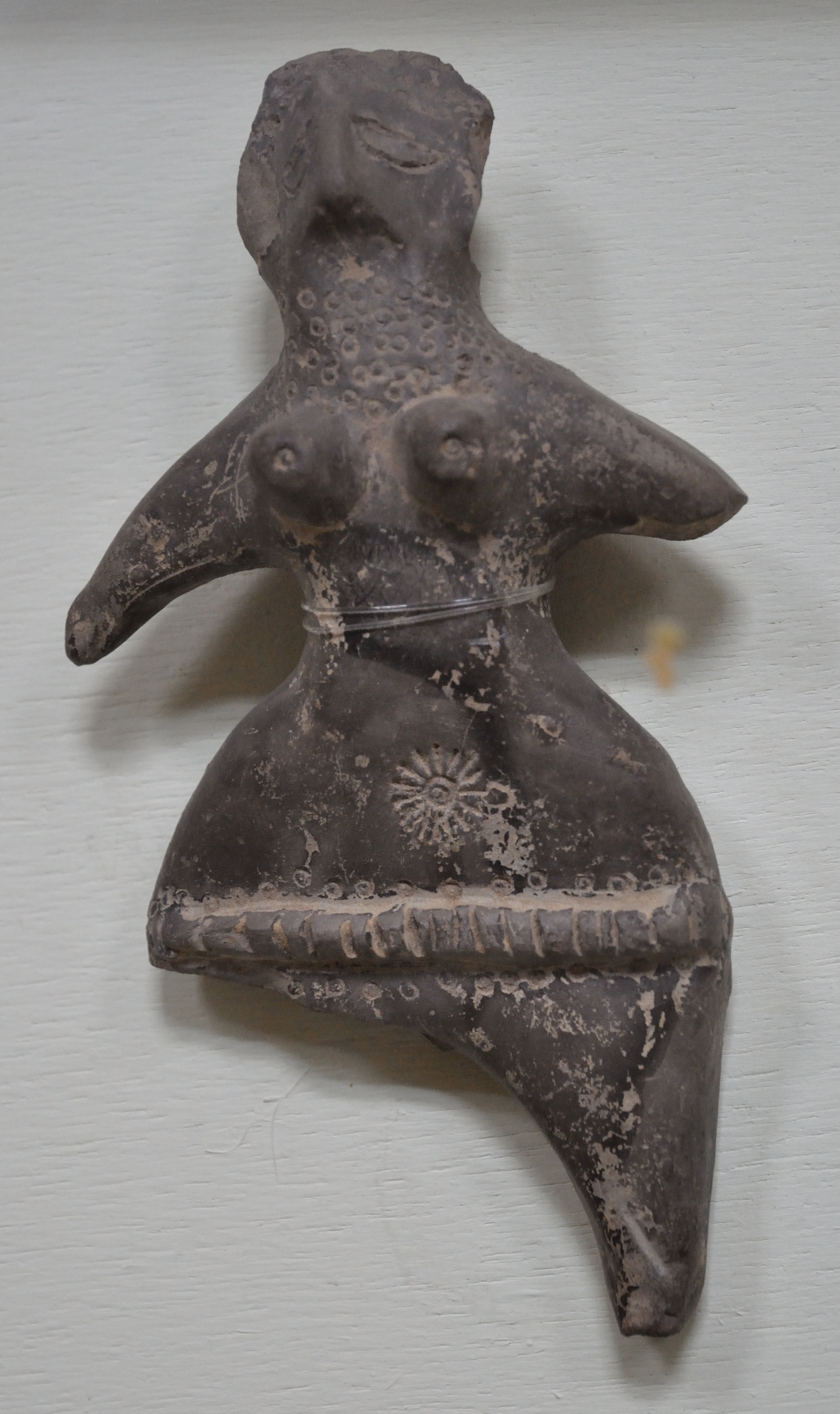
Archaic Mother Goddess, Prehistory, 4th Century BCE

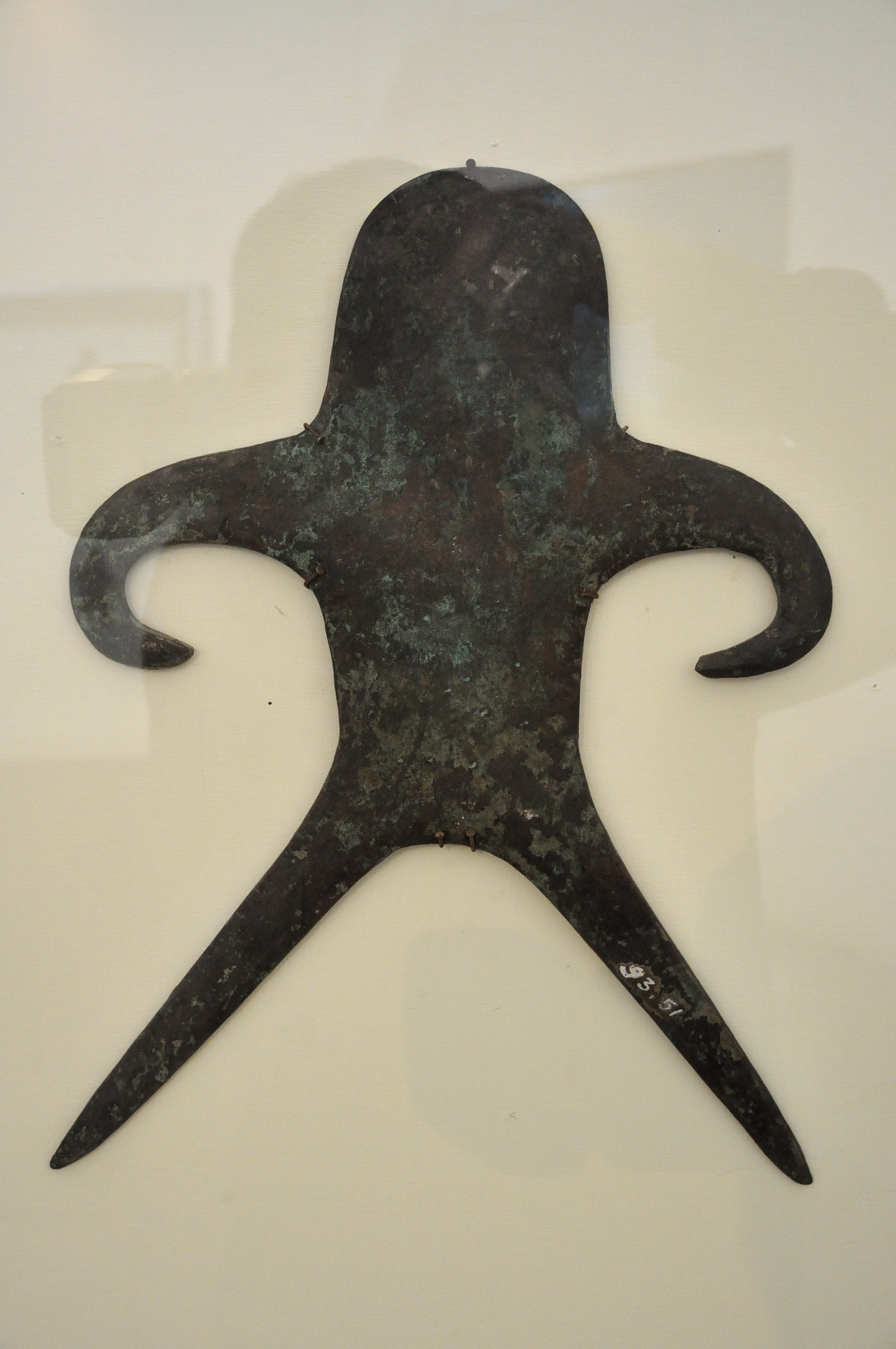
3000-year-old anthropomorphic copper figure (ACCN 93-51) found at Shahabad, UP

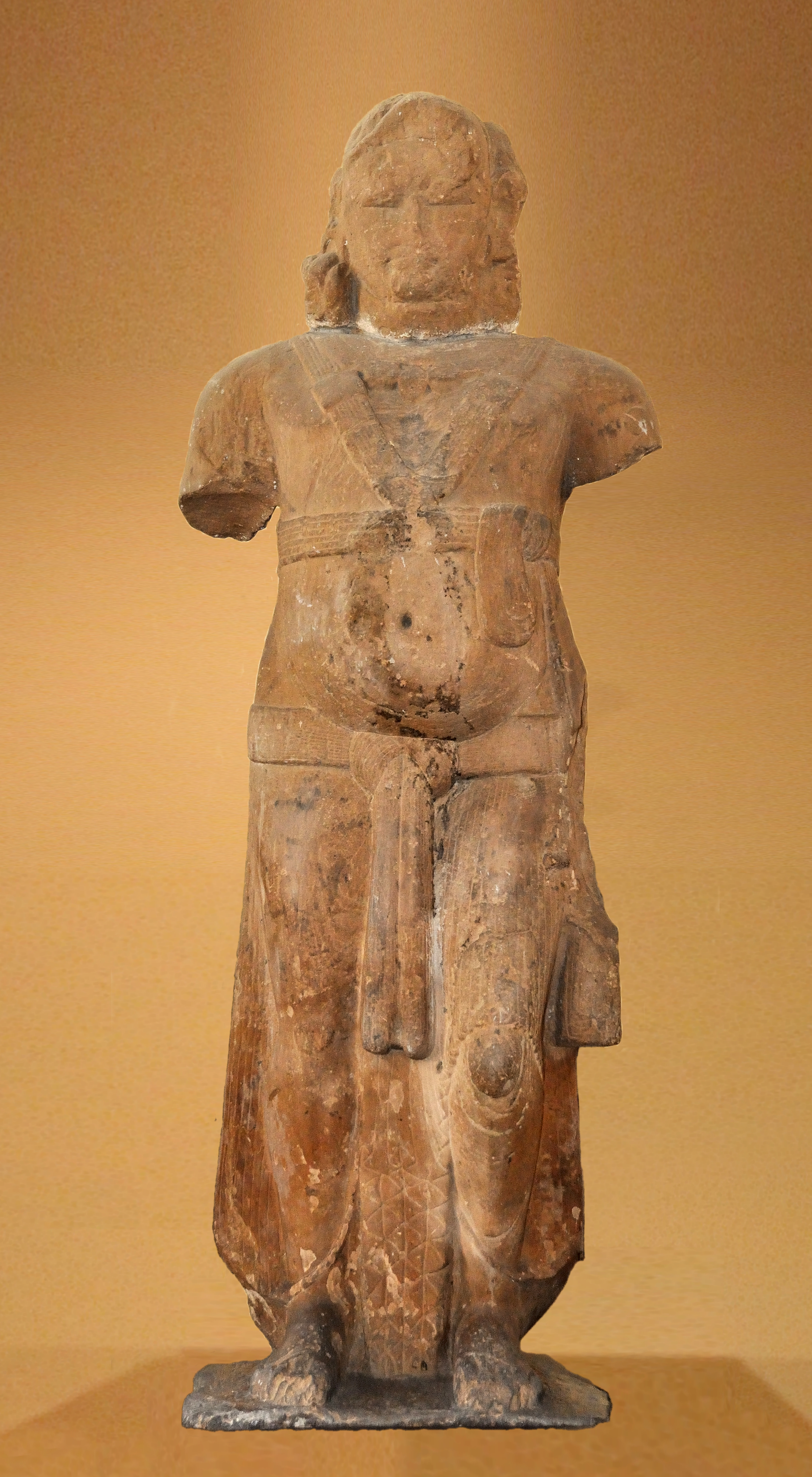
Parkham Yaksha, 150 BCE

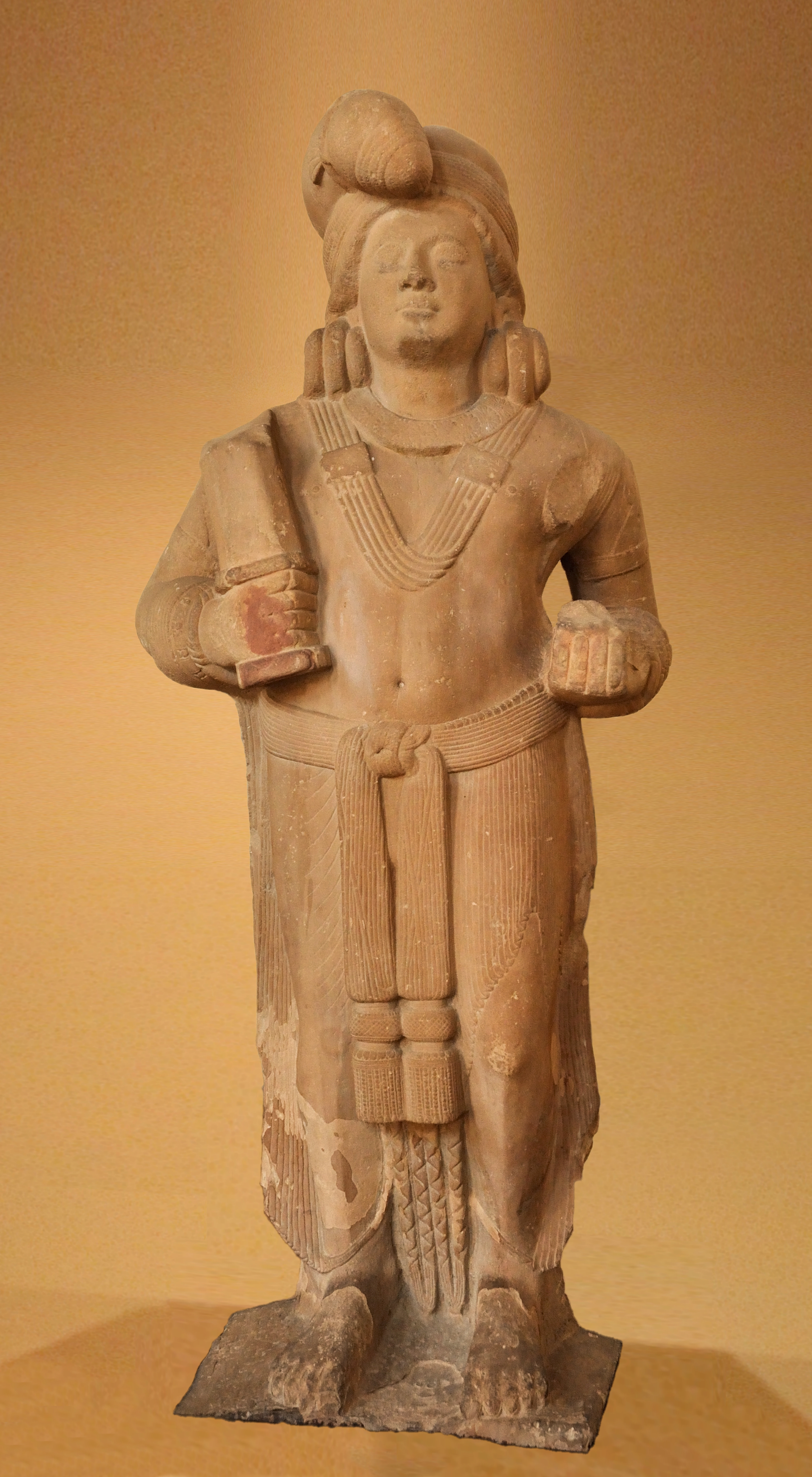
Mudgarpani Yaksha, 100 BCE

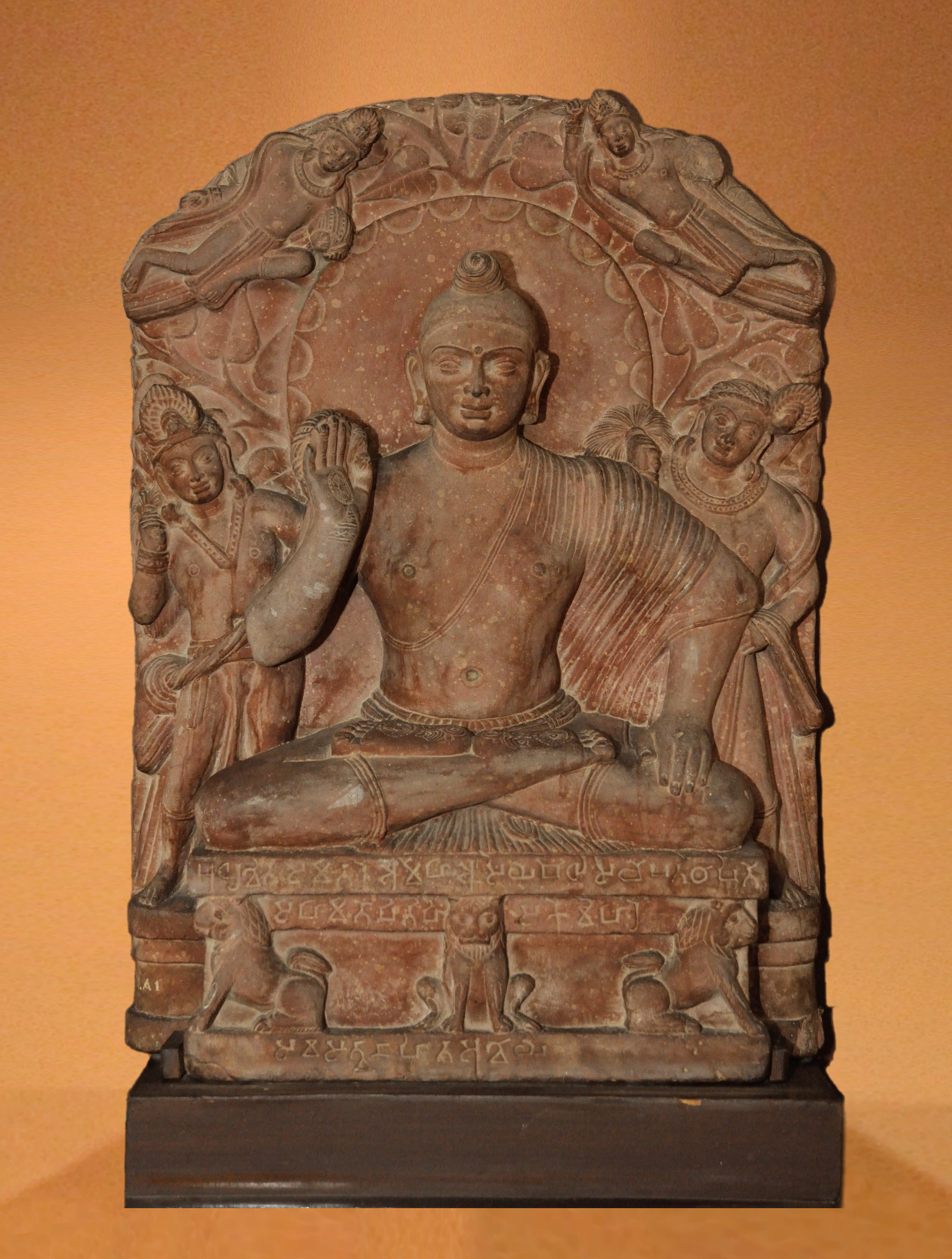
Seated Bodhisattva, 1st century CE

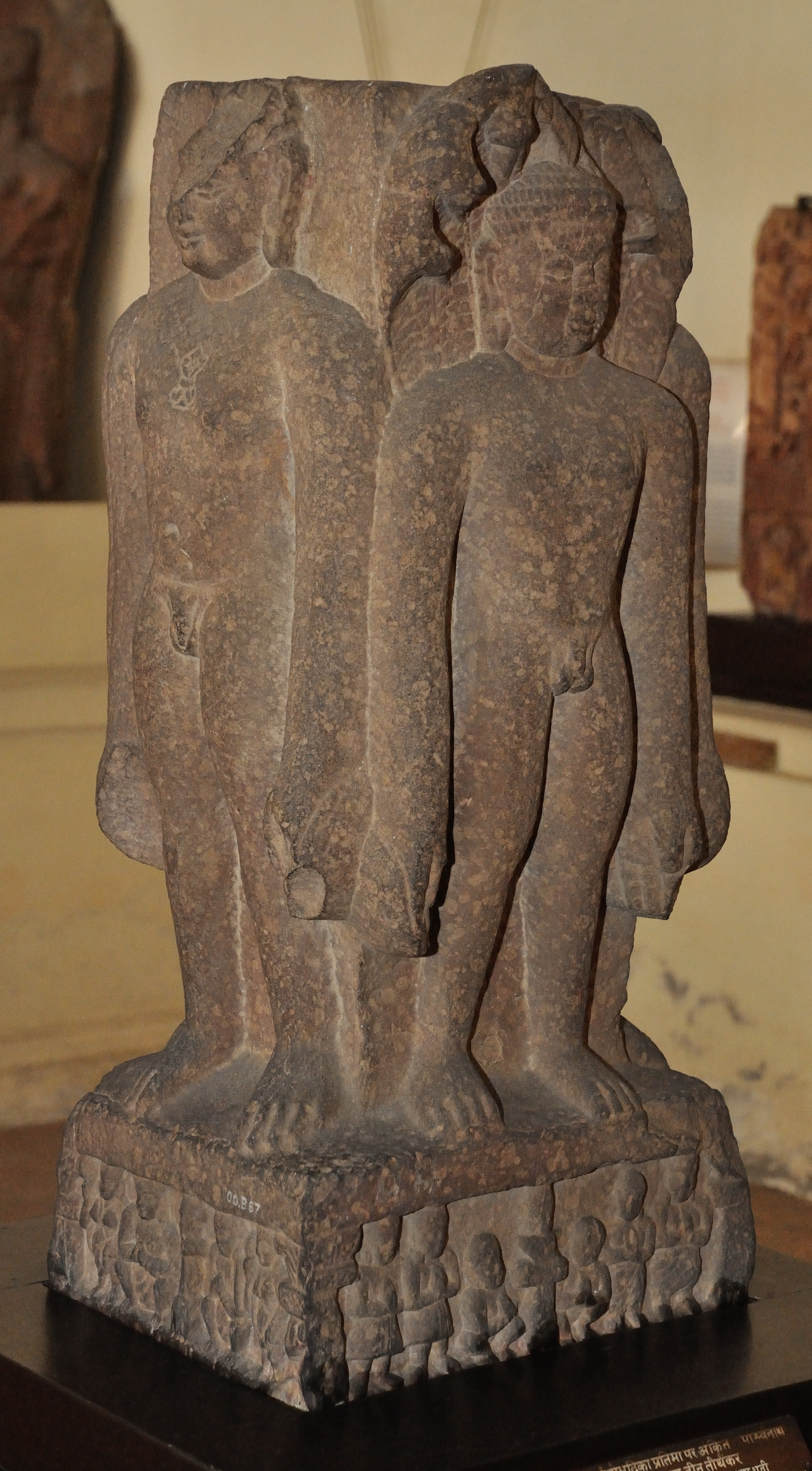
Jain chaumukha sculpture with Suparshvanatha and Three Other Tirthankaras, 1st century

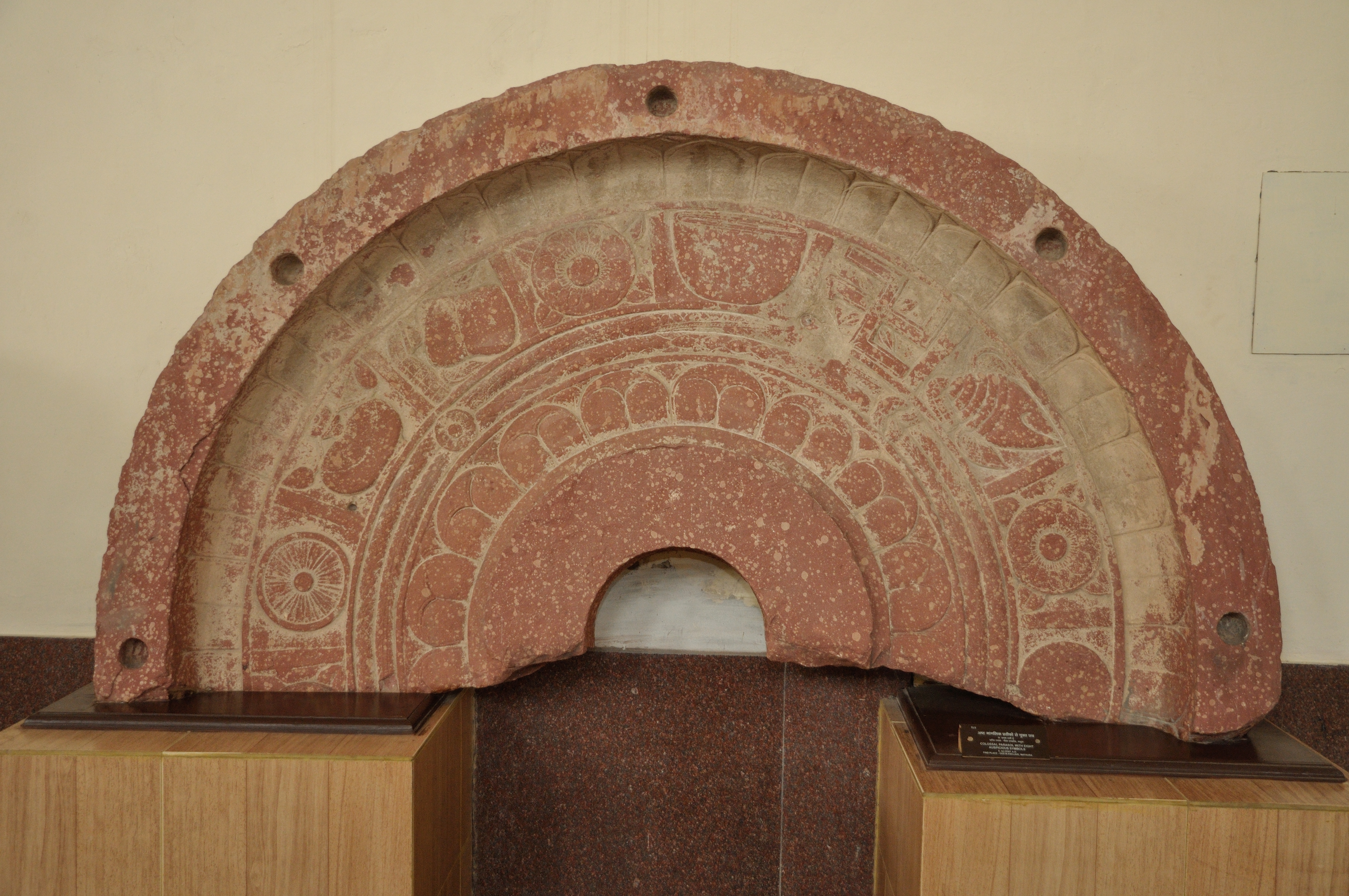
Jain Ashtamangala, 1st century

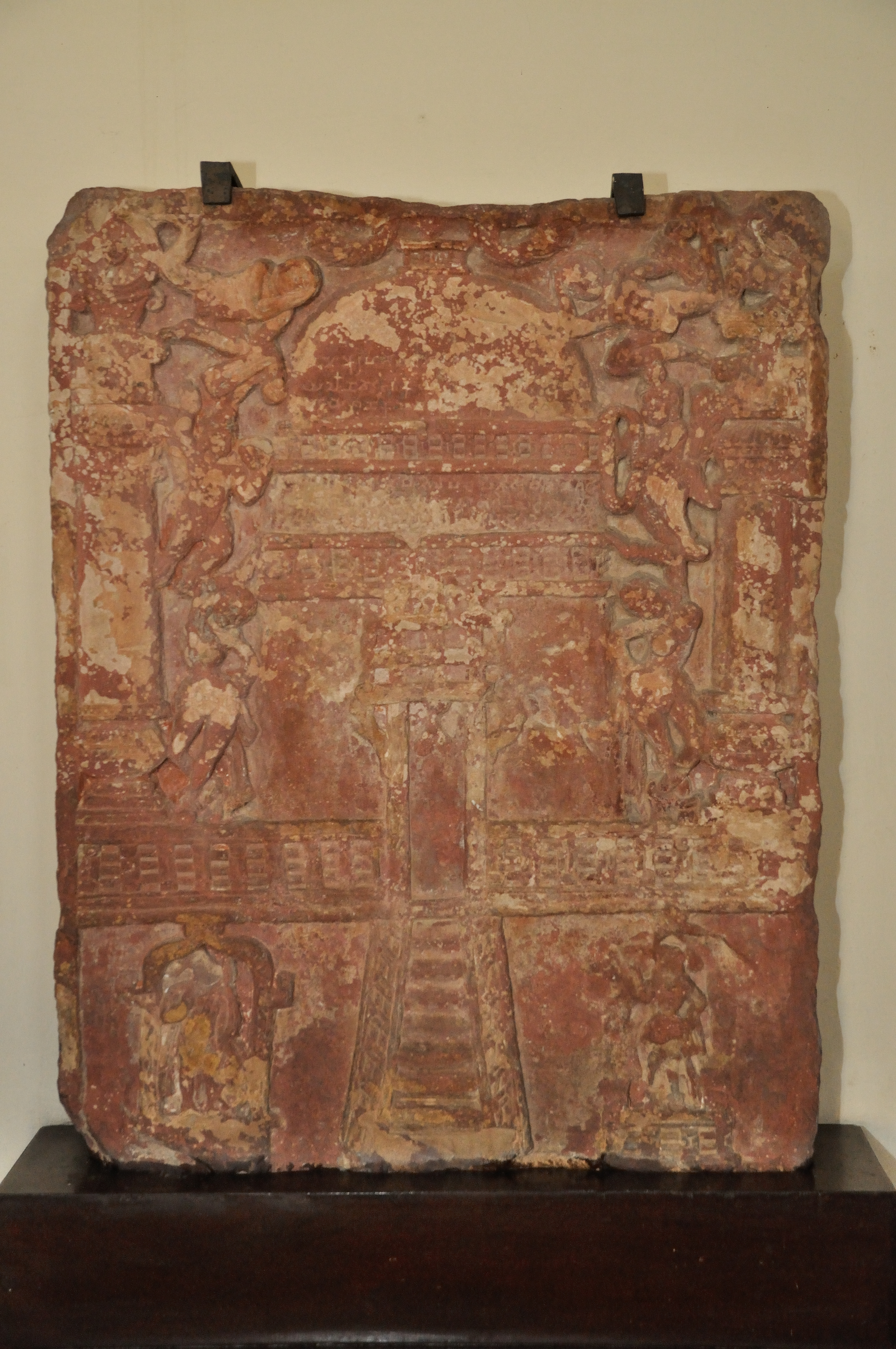
Vasu Śilāpaṭa Ayagapata, Jain Tablet, 1st Century

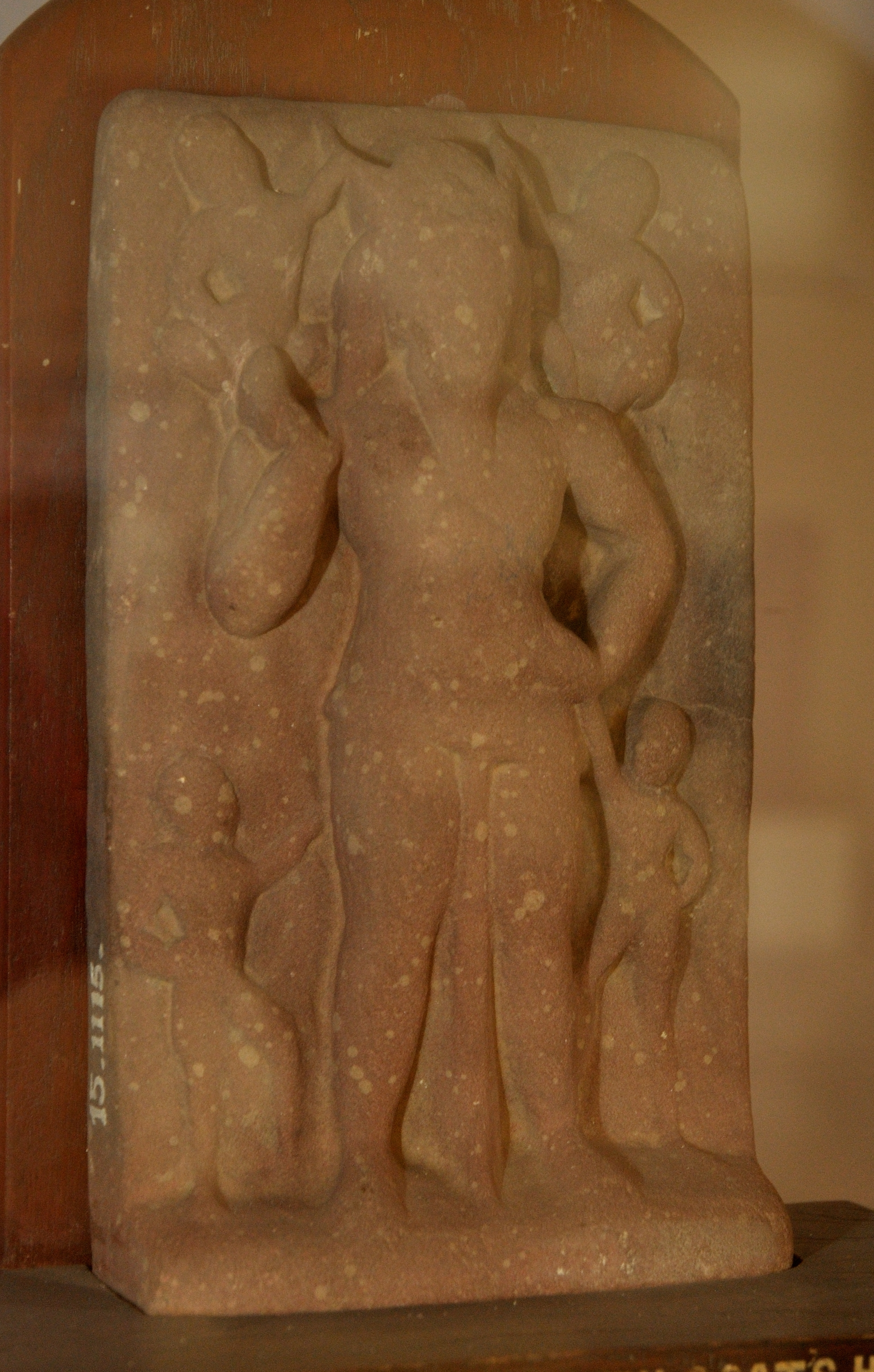
Naigamesha Jain god of Childbirth, 1st-3rd century CE.

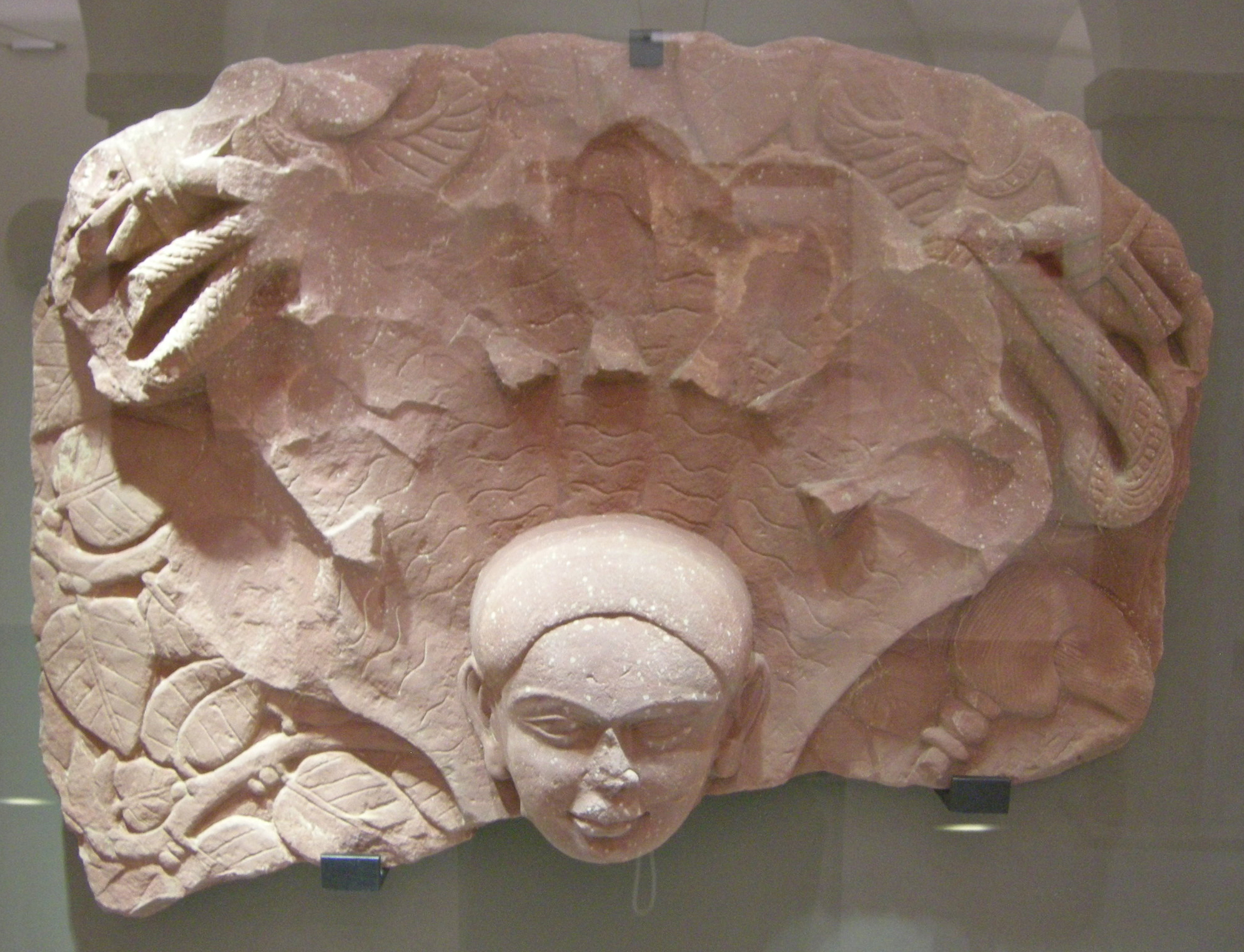
Parshvantha, Kushan Period, 2nd century

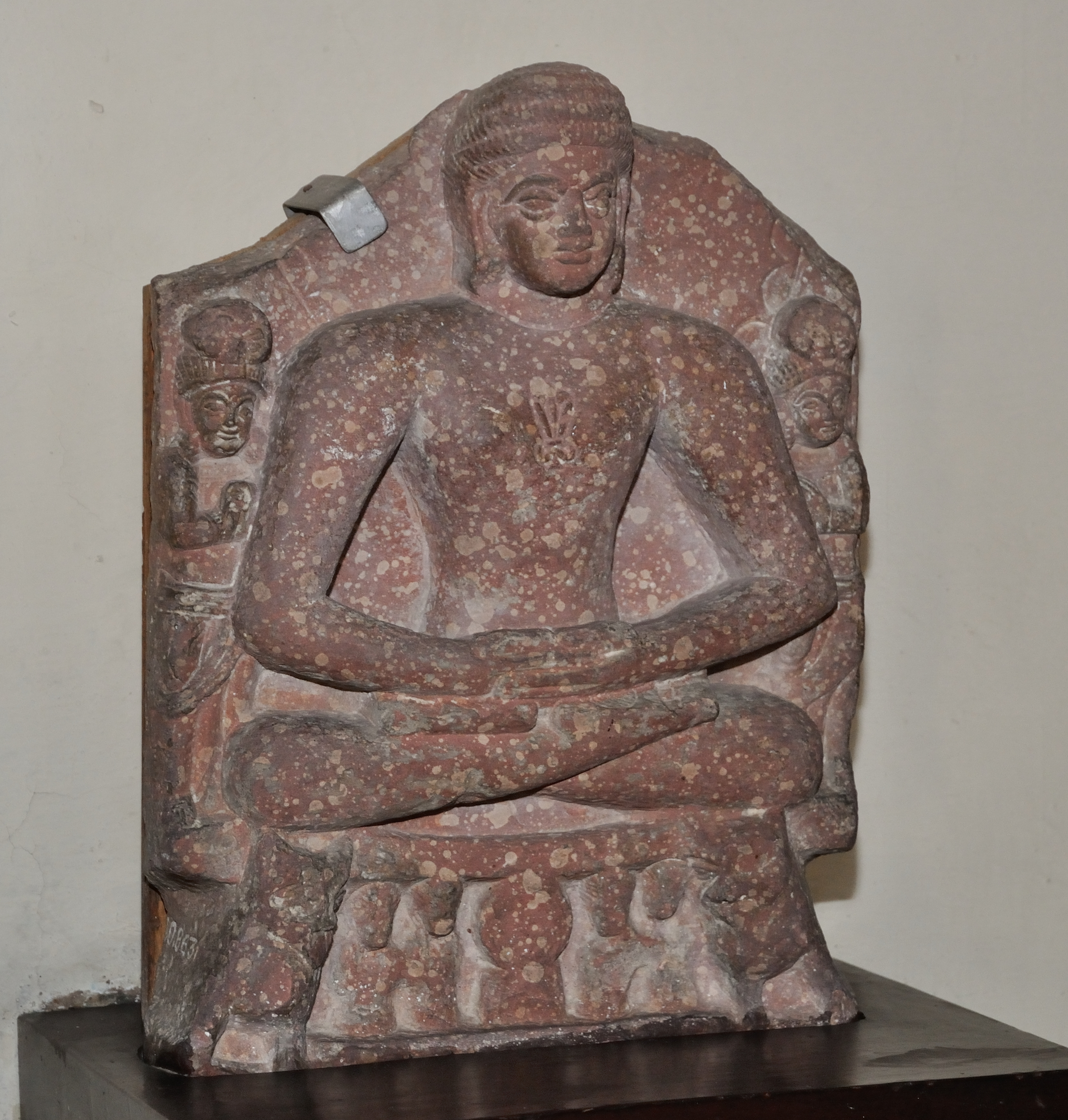
Tirthankara, Kushan Period

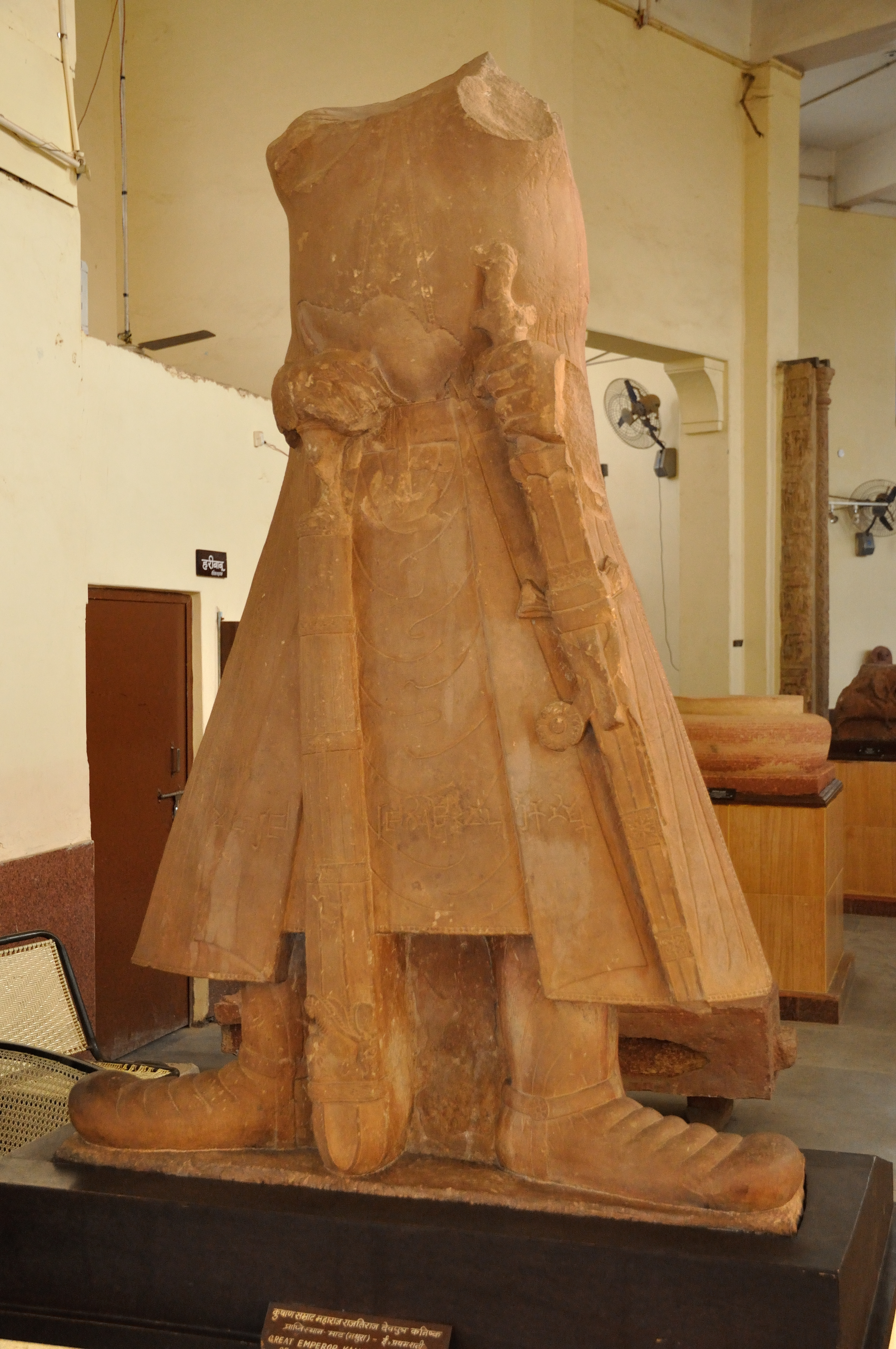
Statue of Kanishka I (c. 127 – c. 140), Kushan Empire.

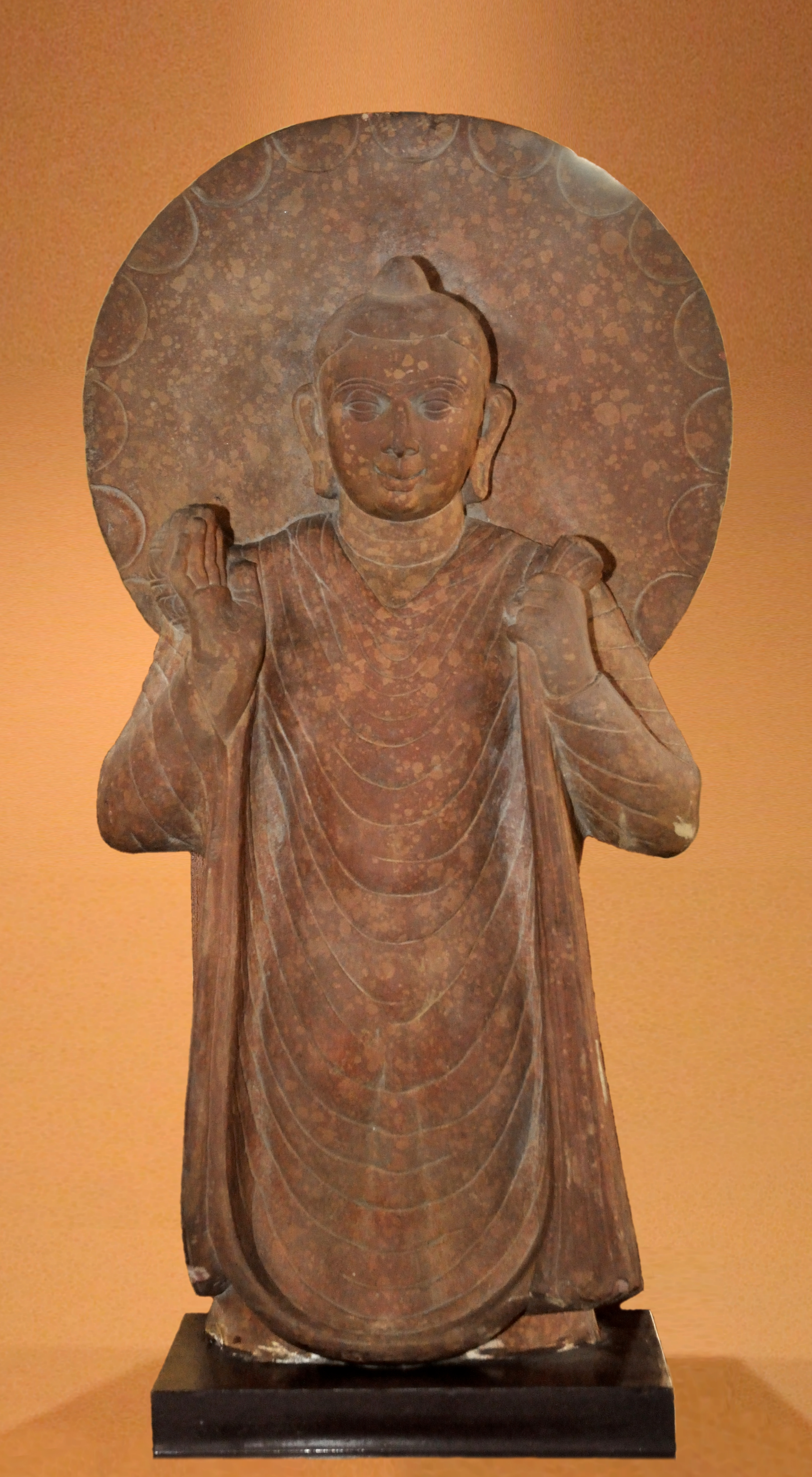
Standing Buddha, 2nd century CE

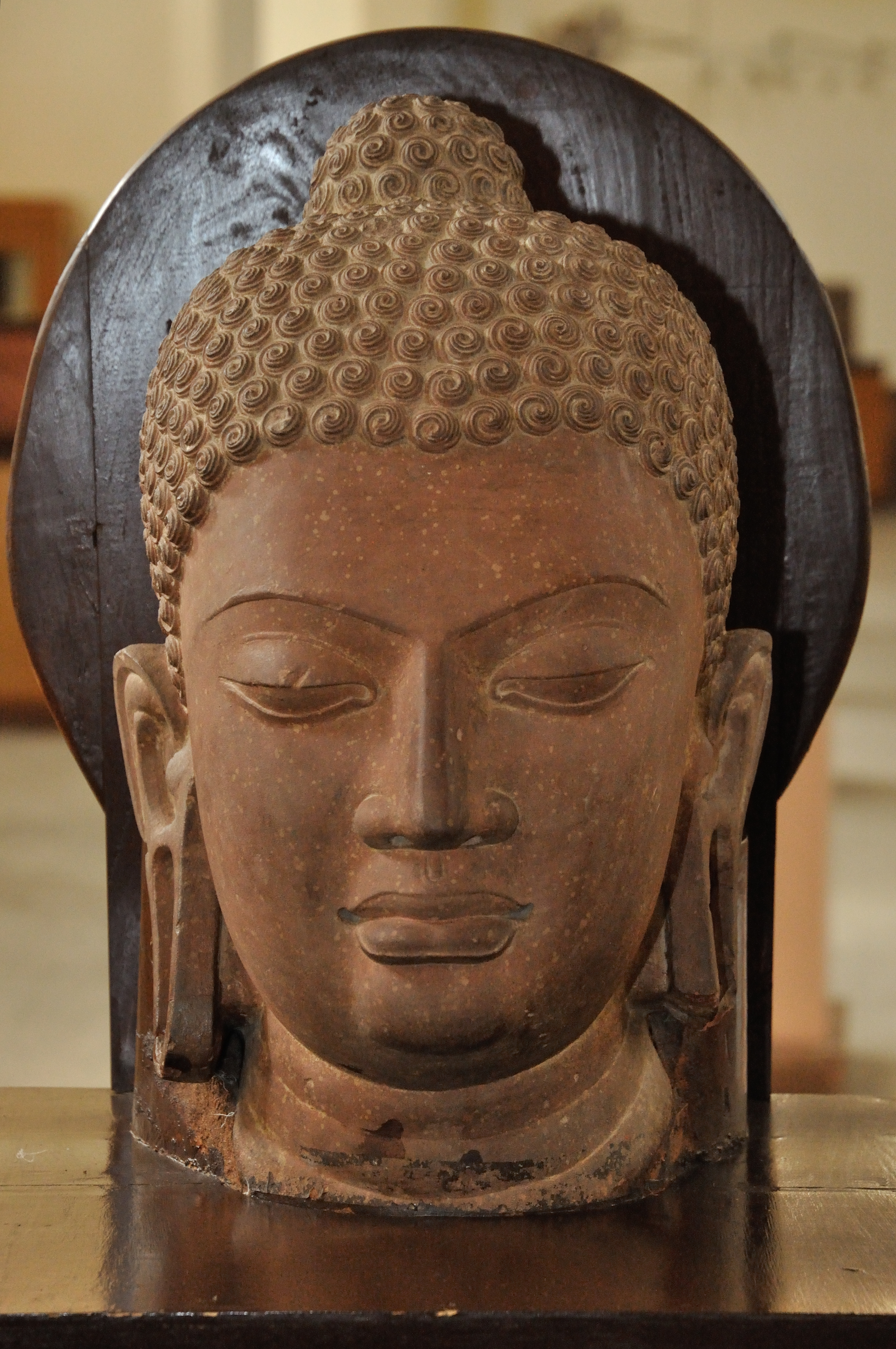
Head of Buddha. C. 5th Century CE, Chamunda mound, Mathura district

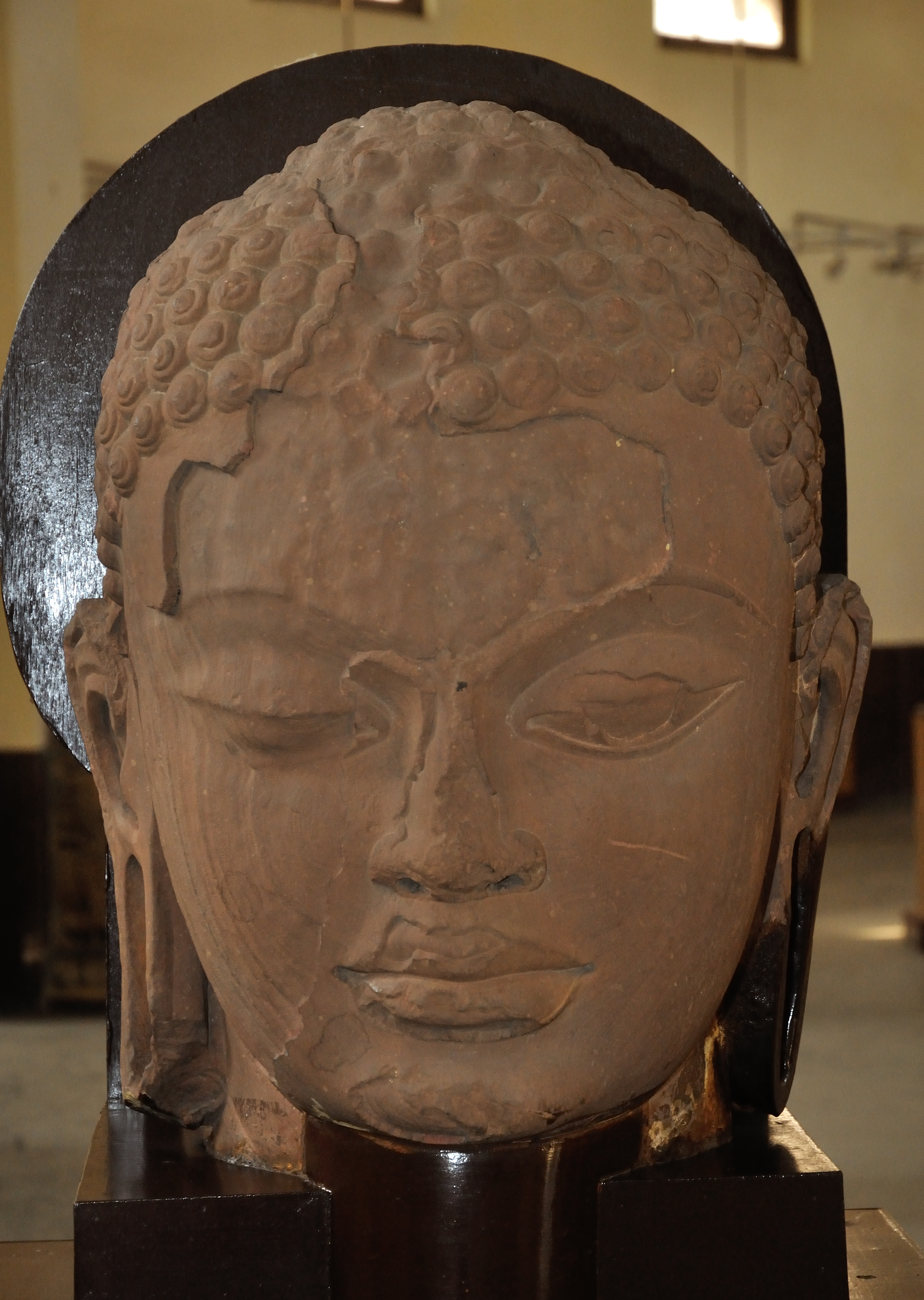
Jain colossal head, Gupta period

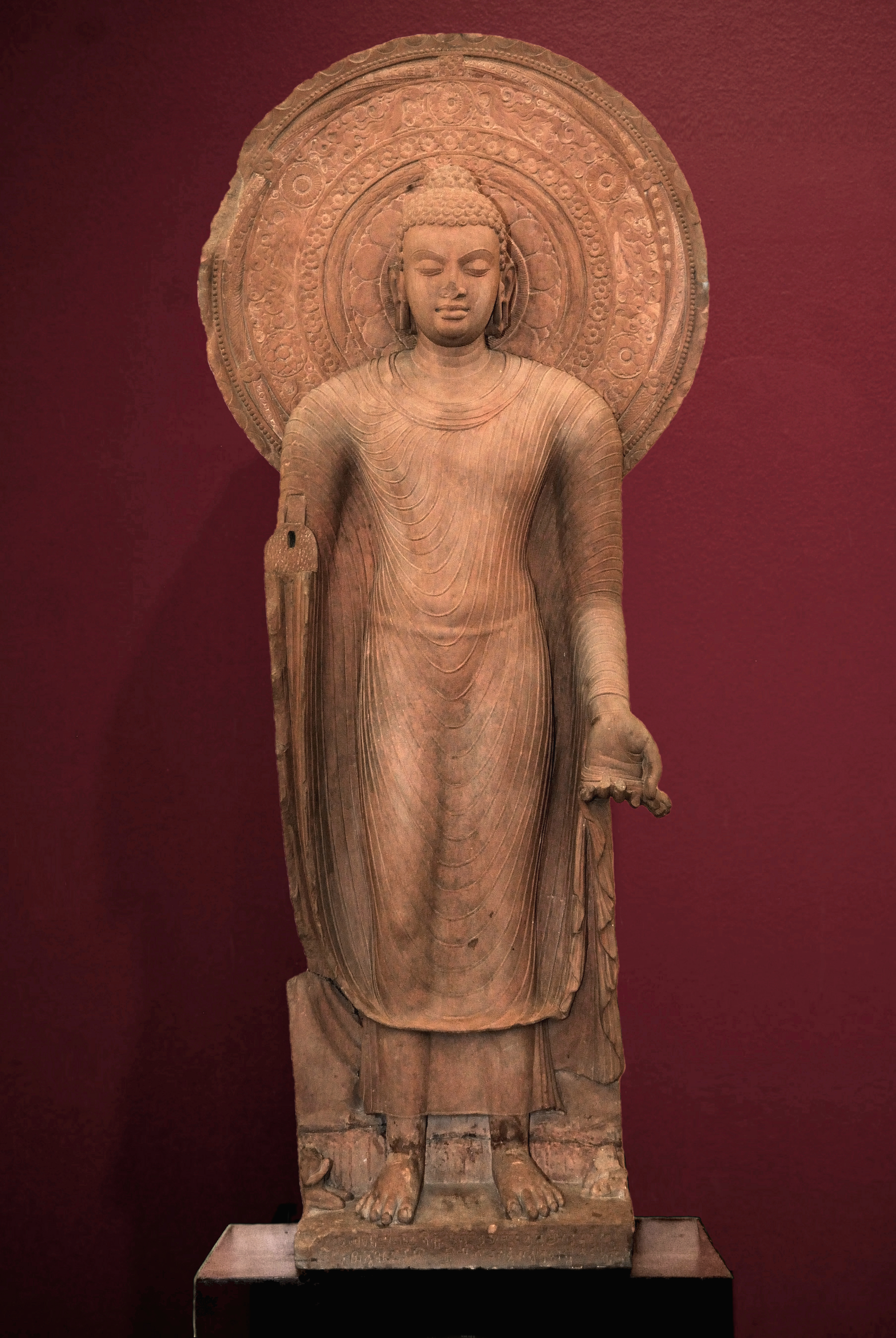
Standing Buddha, 5th century CE

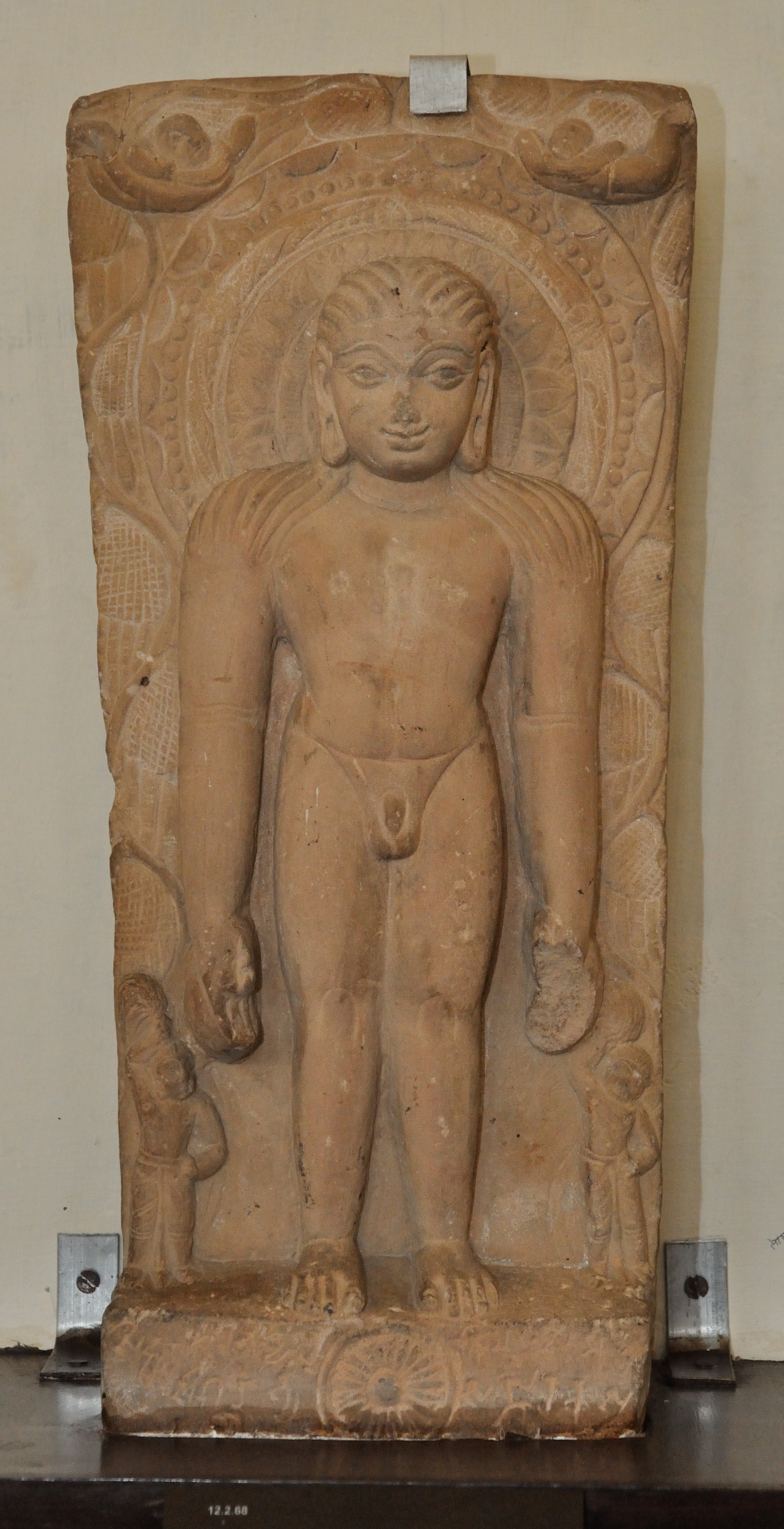
Rishabhanatha idol, 6th century

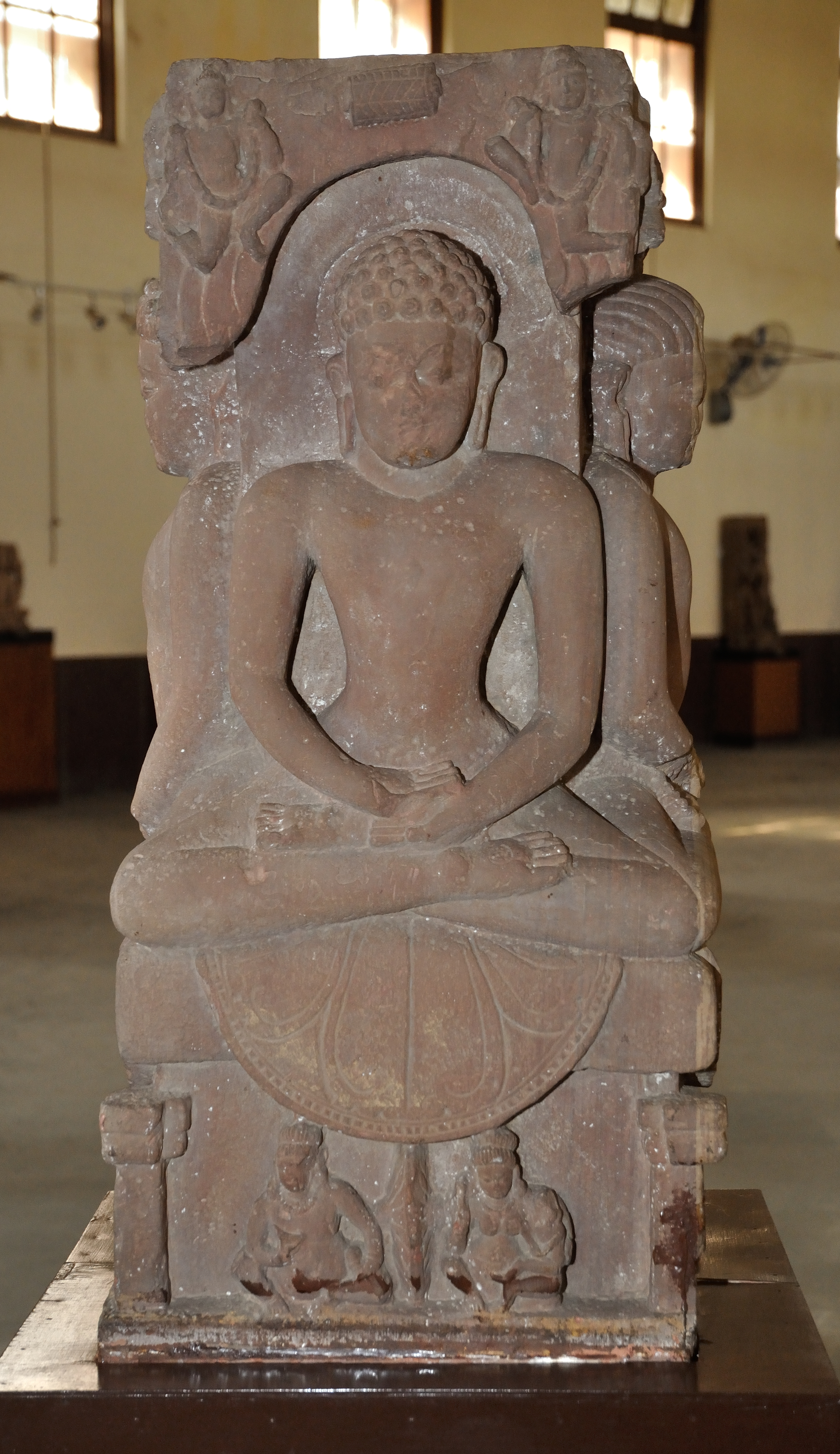
Jain chaumukha sculpture, 6th century

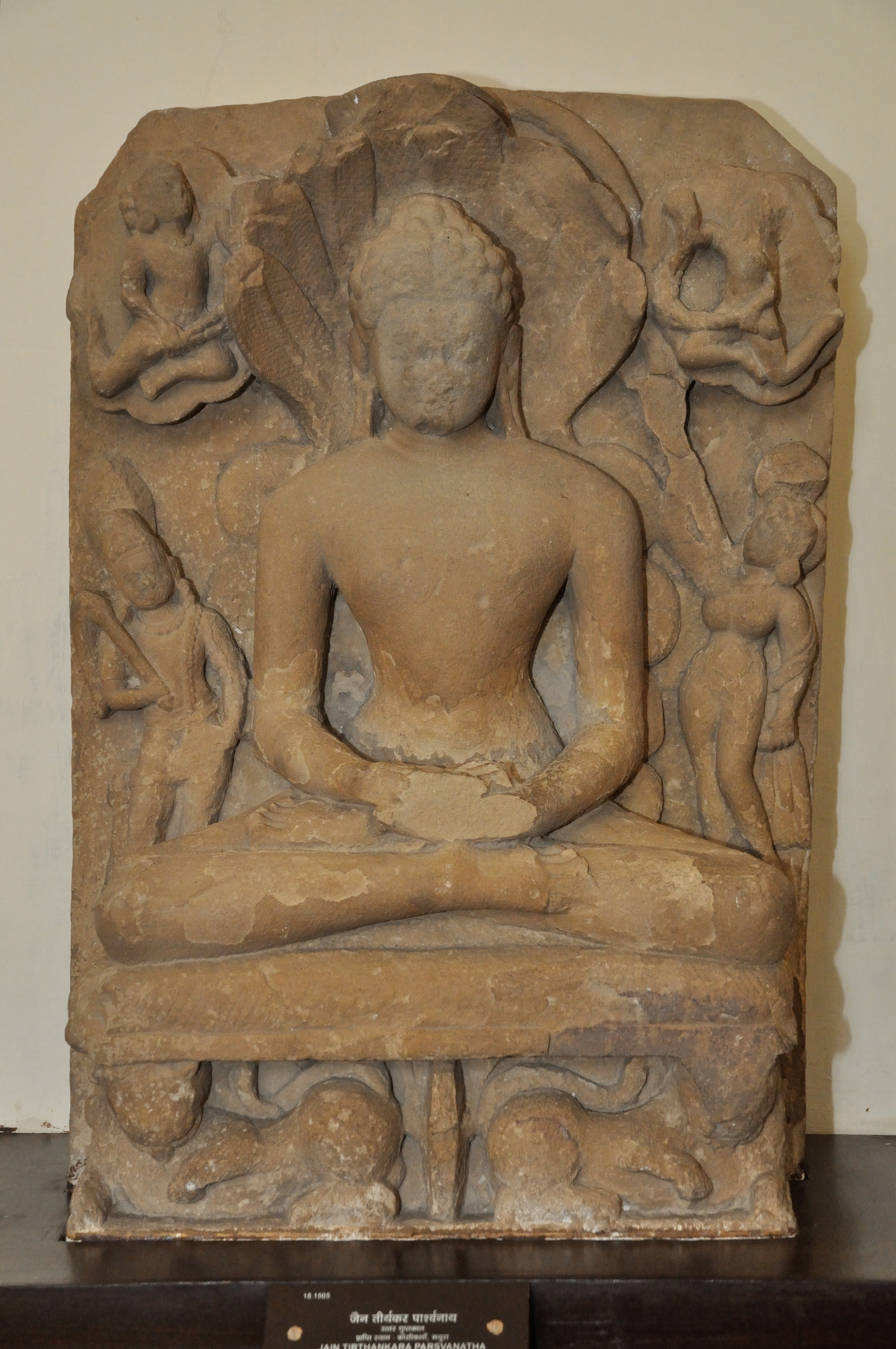
Parshvanatha, Post Gupta Period, 6th-8th Century CE

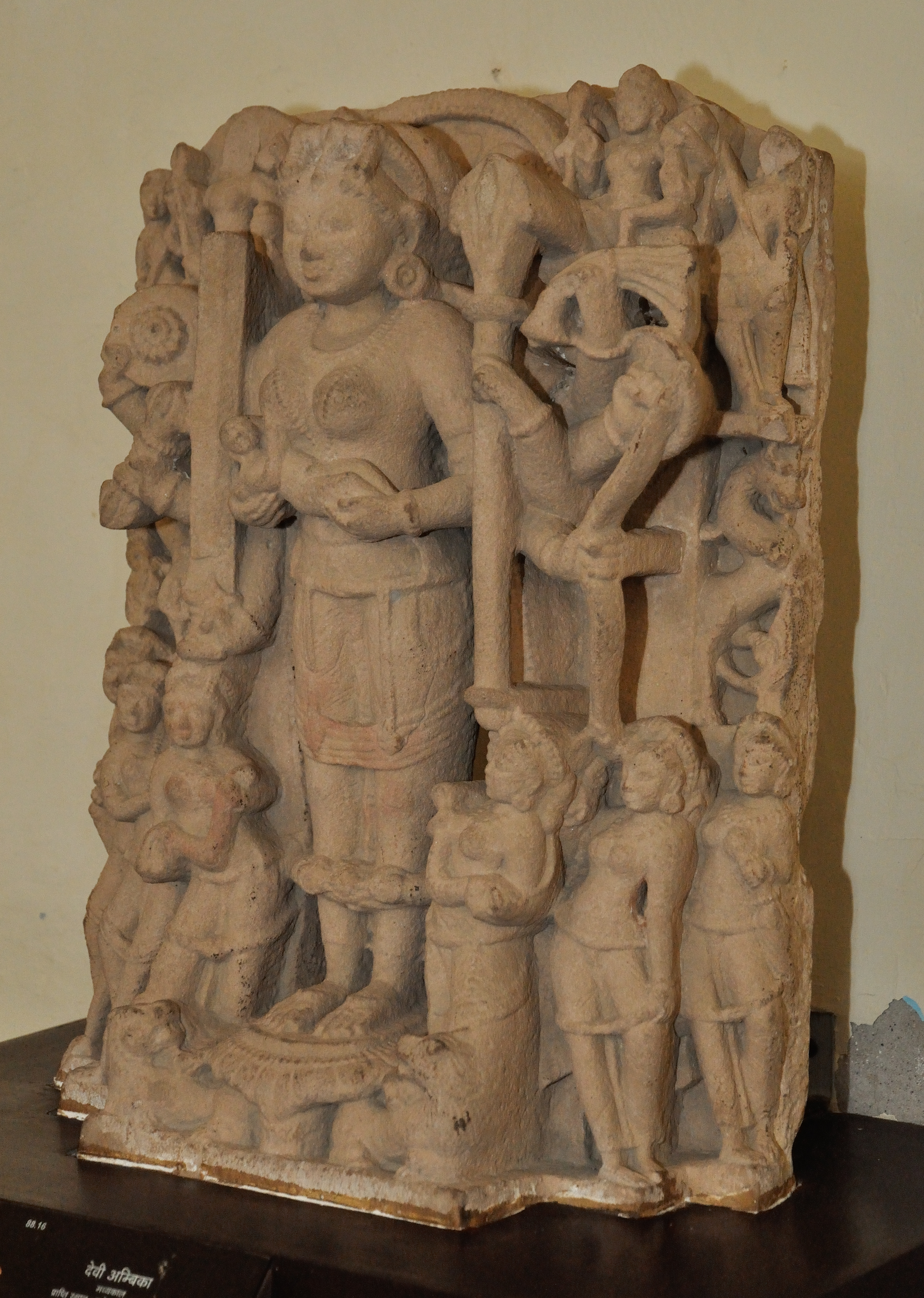
Goddess Ambika - Medieval Period

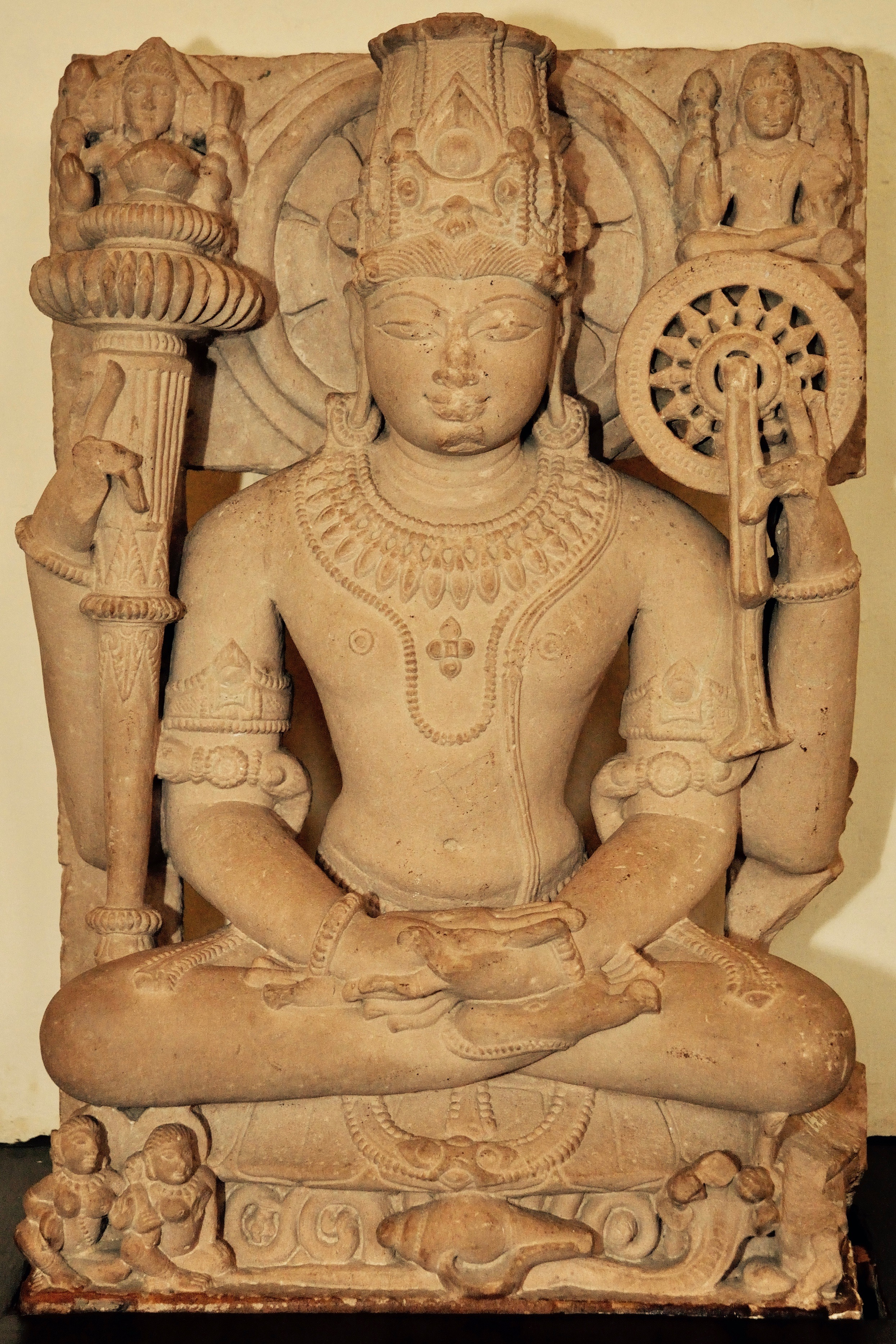
Four-armed seated Vishnu in meditation. Medieval Period, Pannapur.

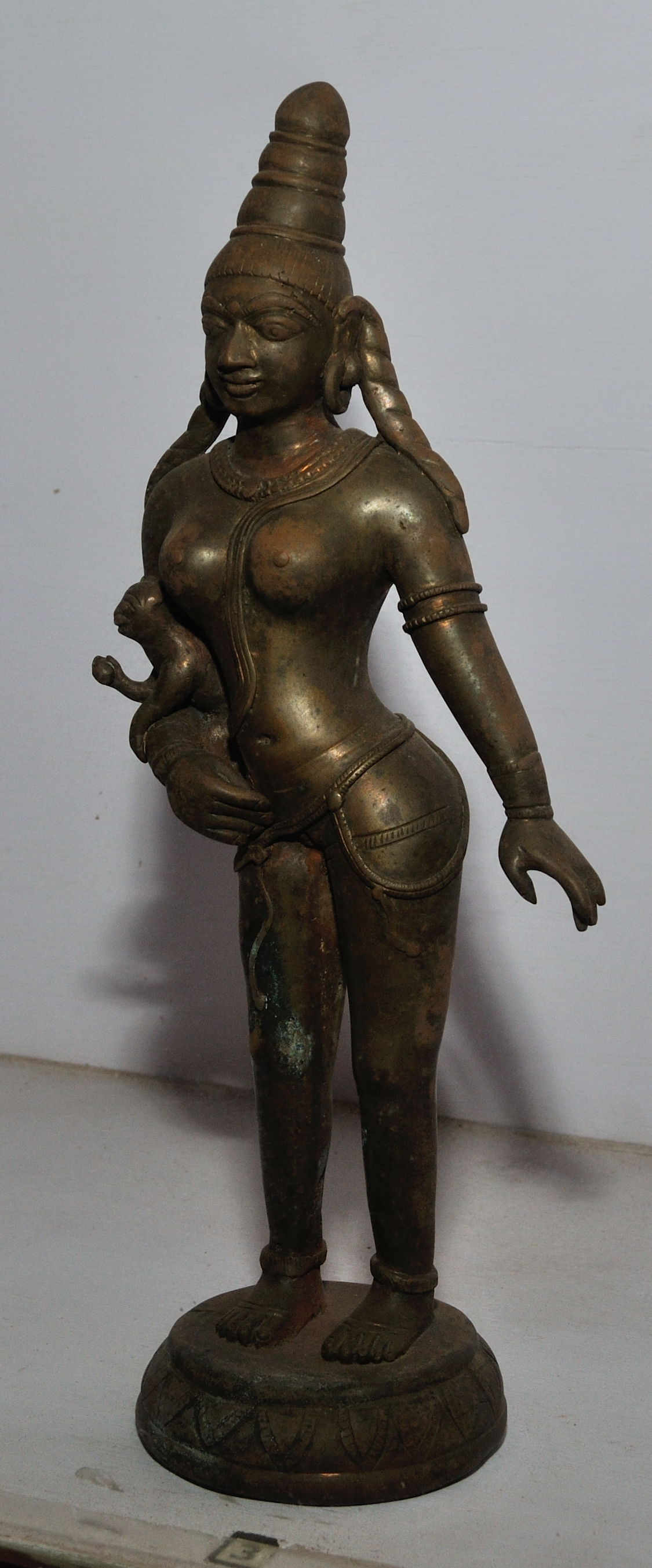
Anjani with Child Hanuman, Bronze, Pallava Period

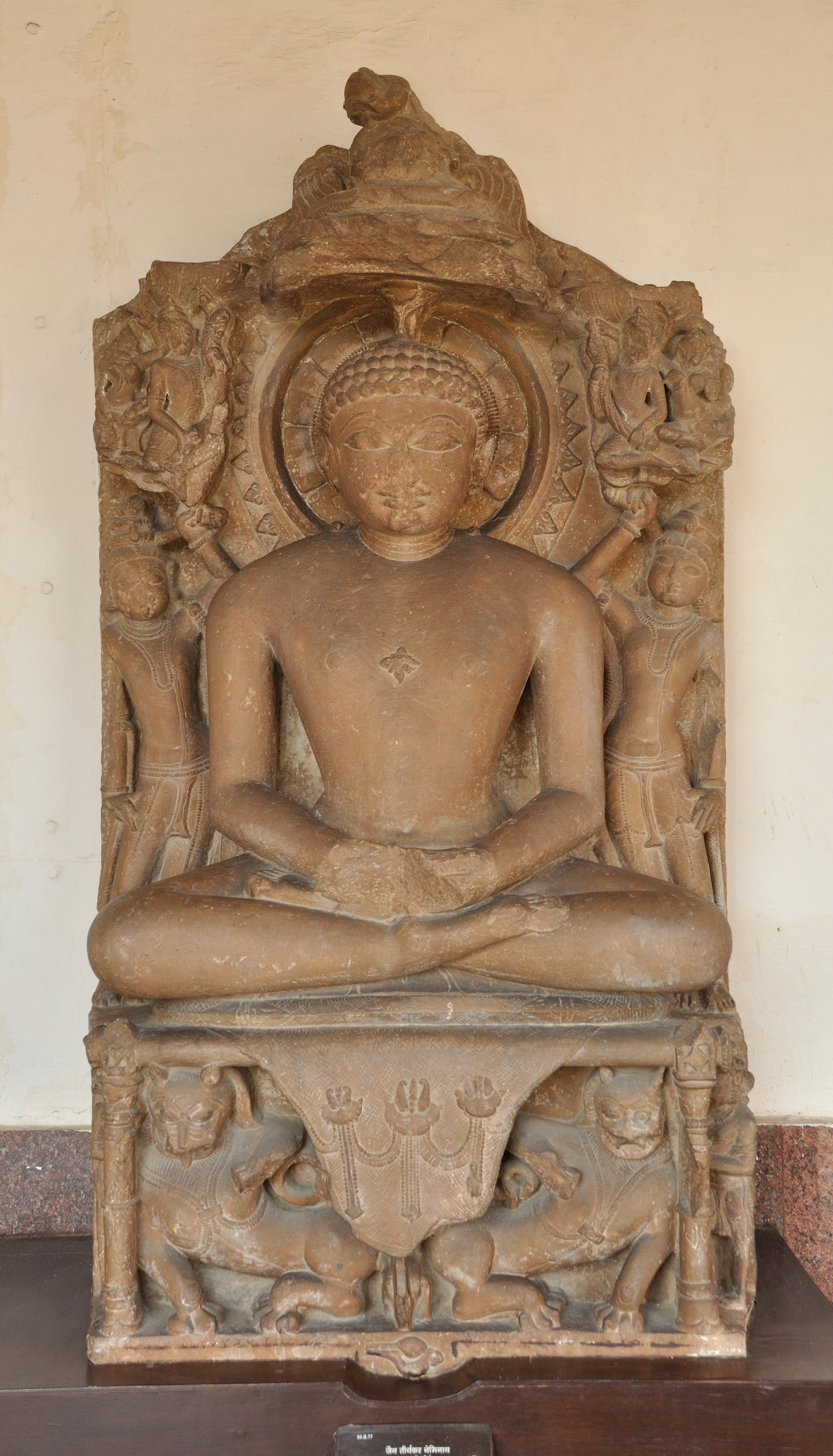
Naminatha, 12th century

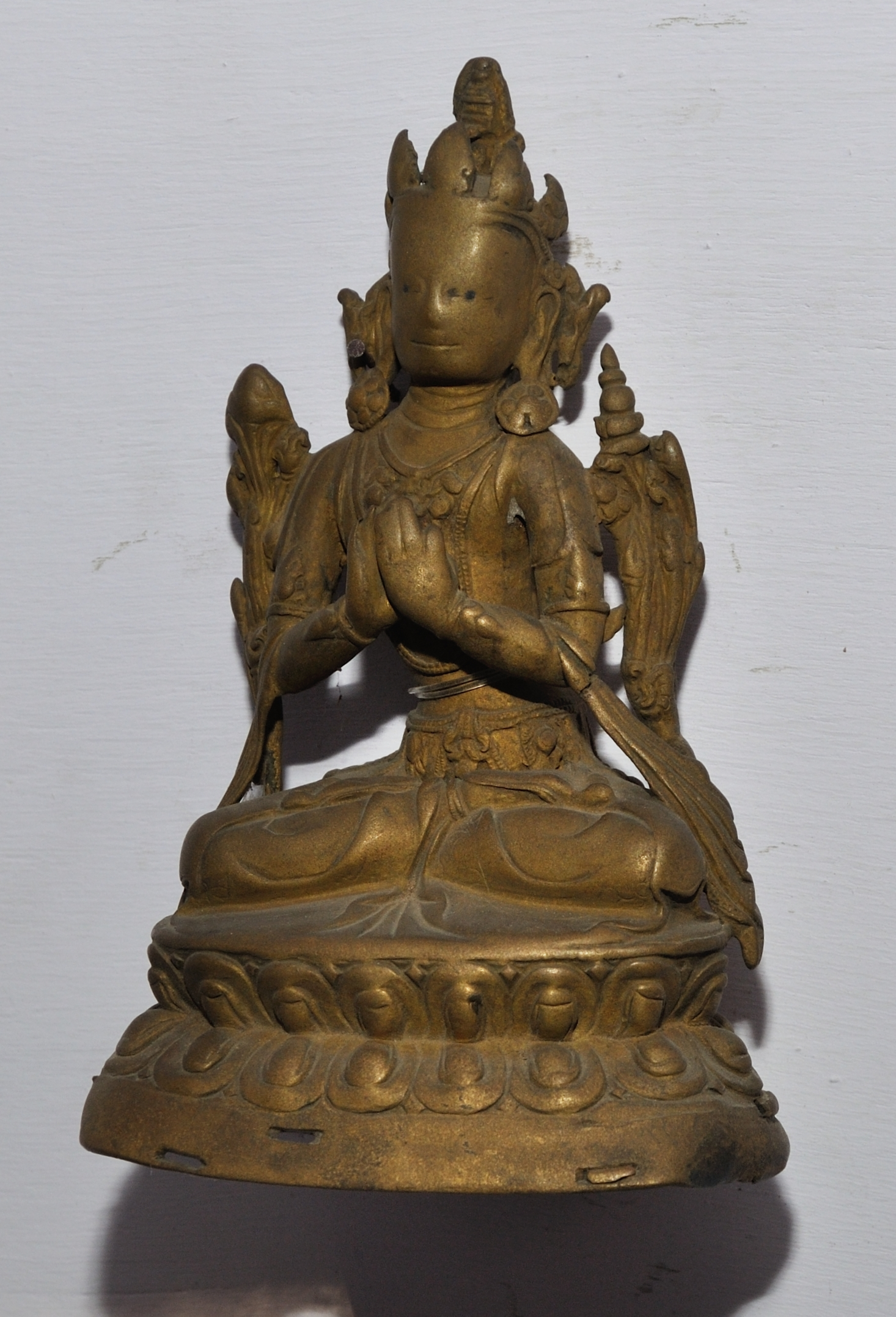
Bodhisattva Manjushri statue, 15th-16th Century

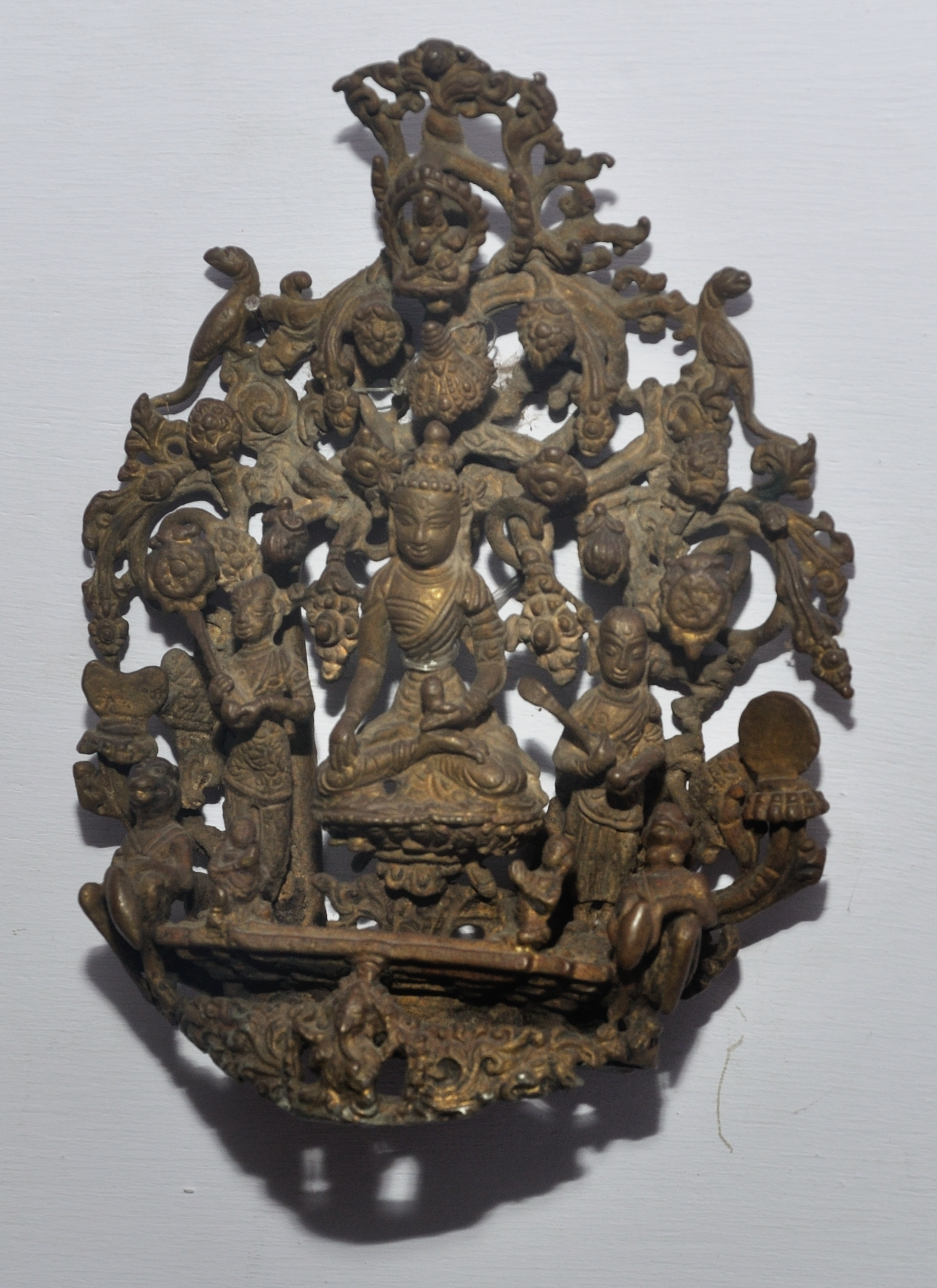
Buddha with Vajra, Bronze, 18th Century

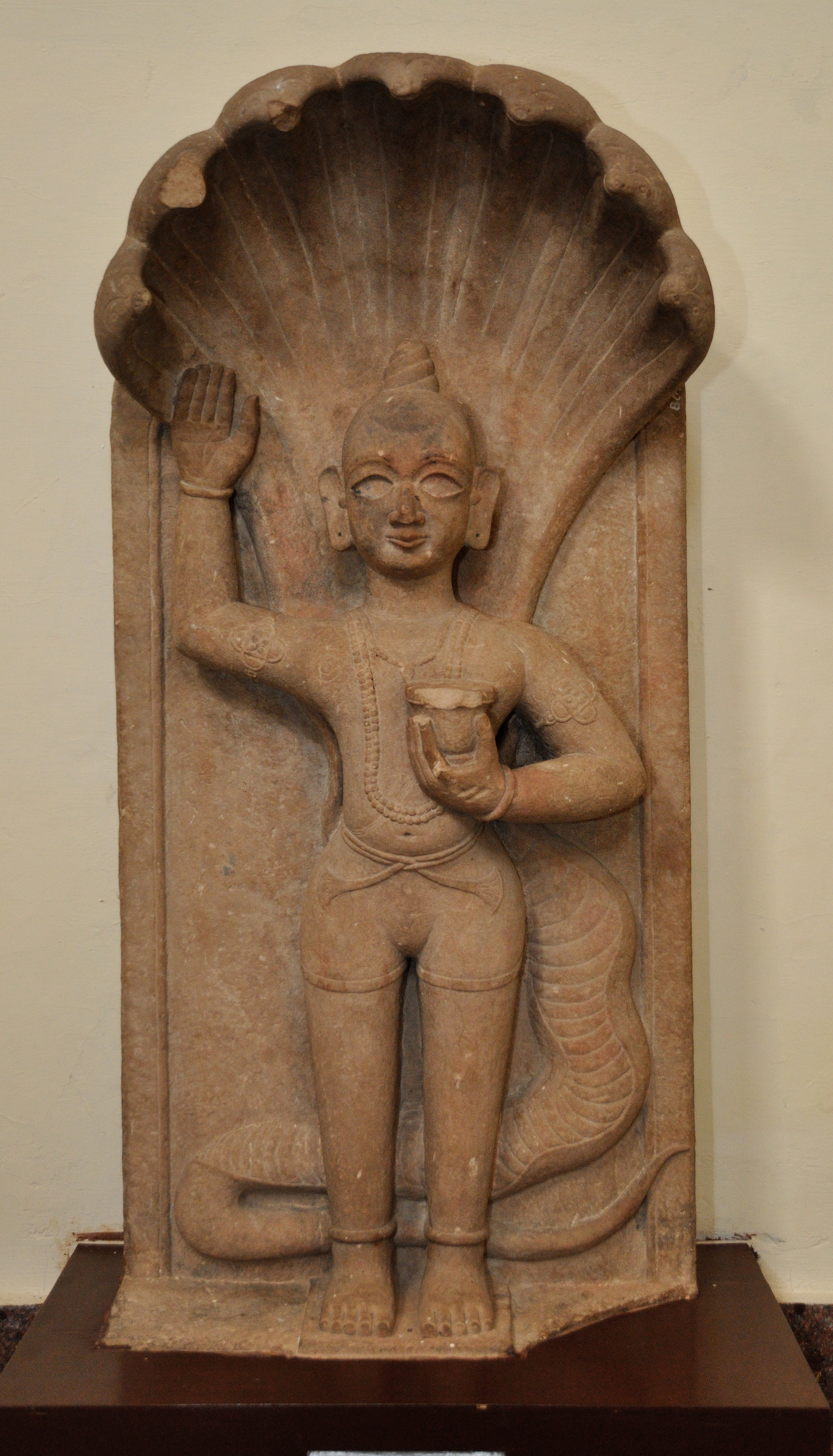
Balarama, 18th Century

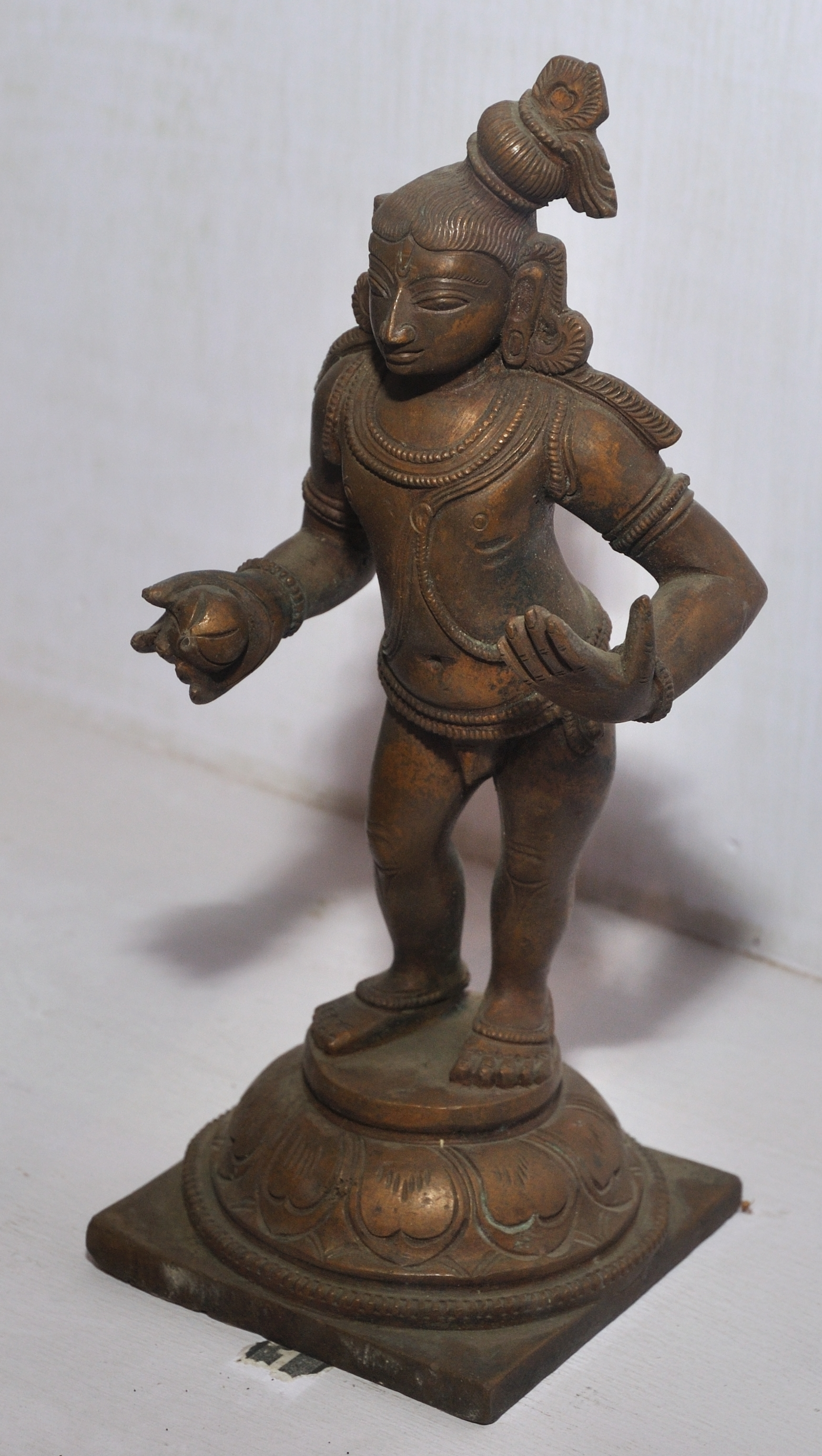
Baby Krishna with Ball, Bronze, Modern Age

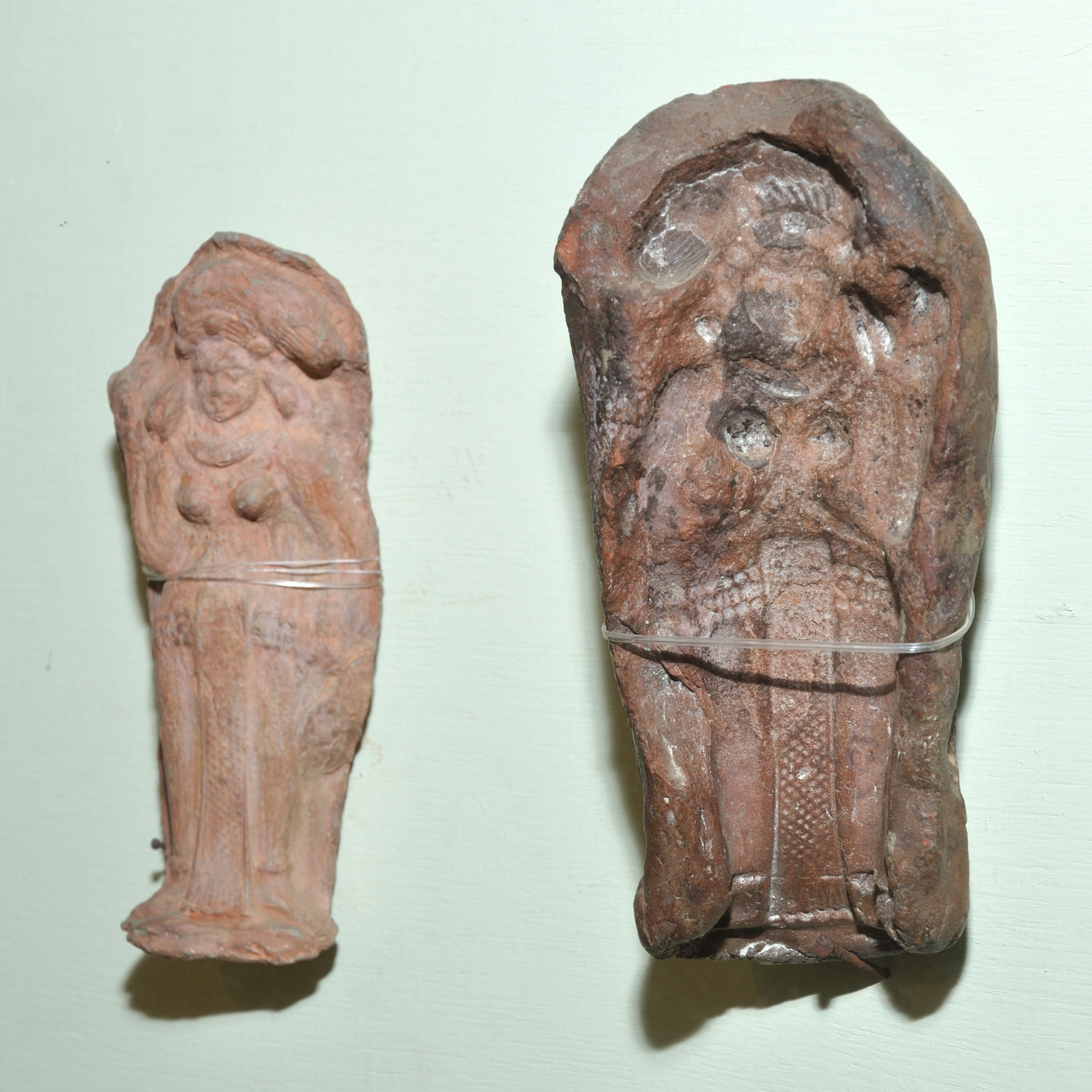
Cast and Mould, Prehistory and Terracotta Gallery

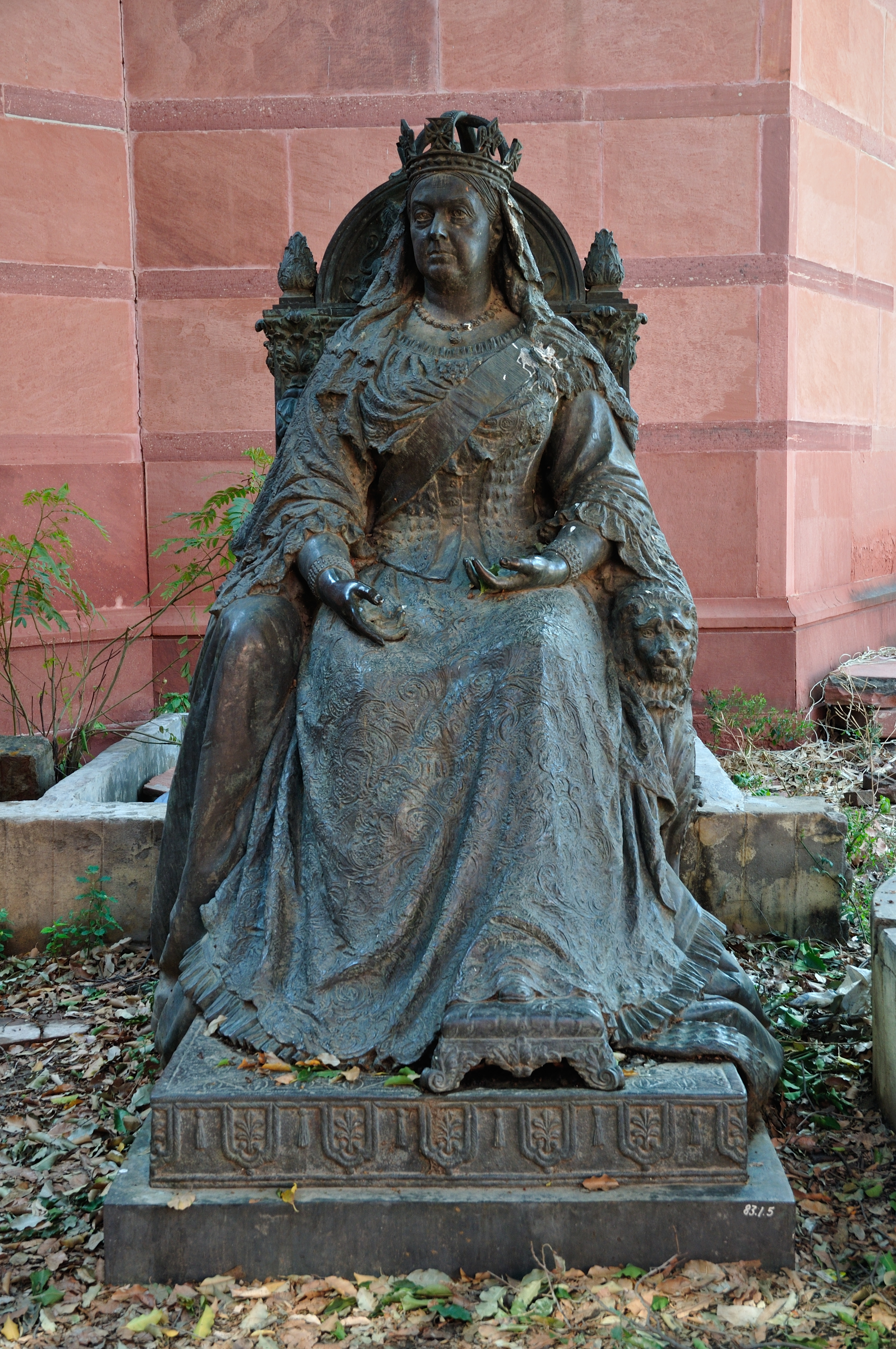
Statue of Victoria, Empress of India

== See also ==
- Mathura lion capital
