= Parkham Yaksha =

Colossal statue of a Yaksha

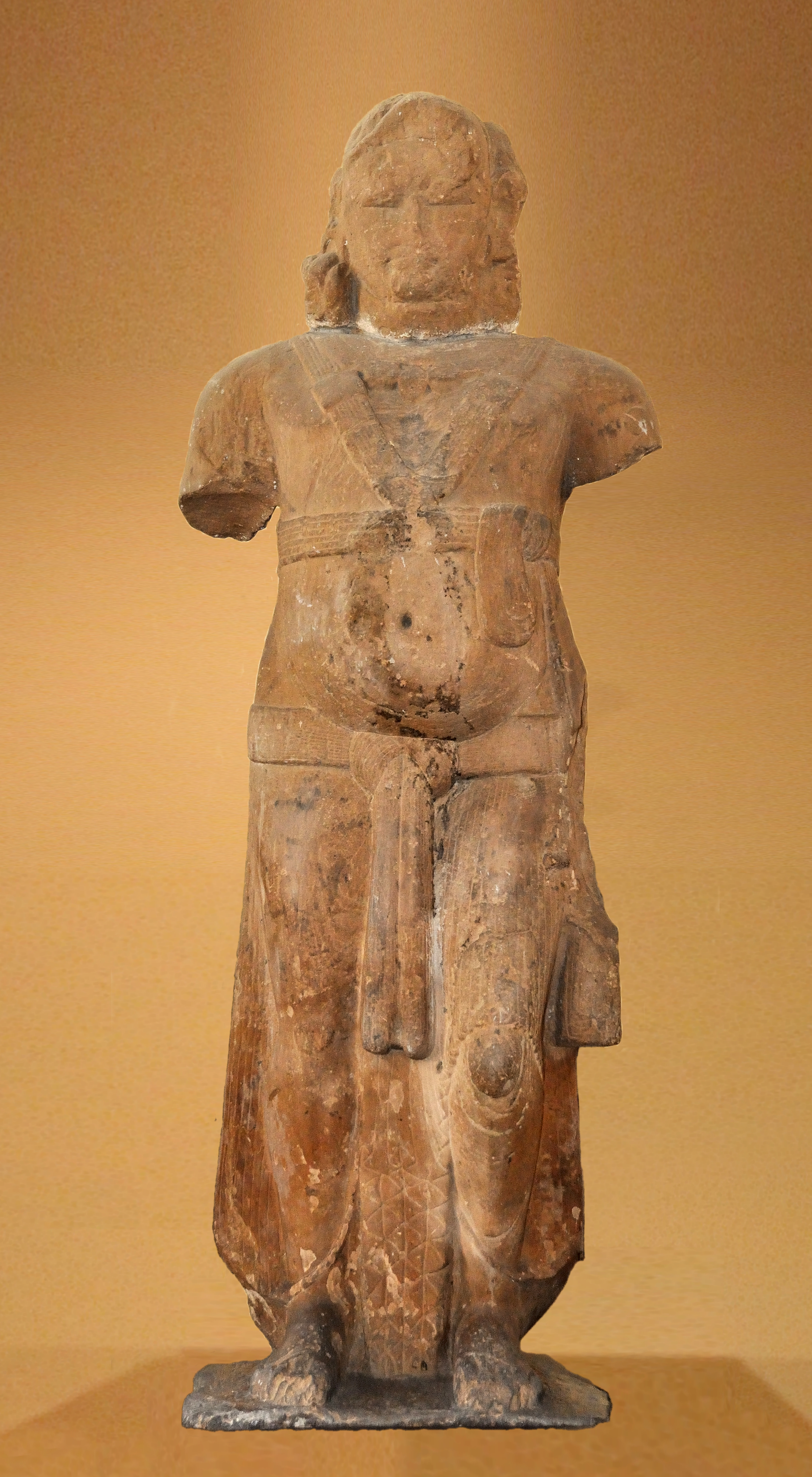
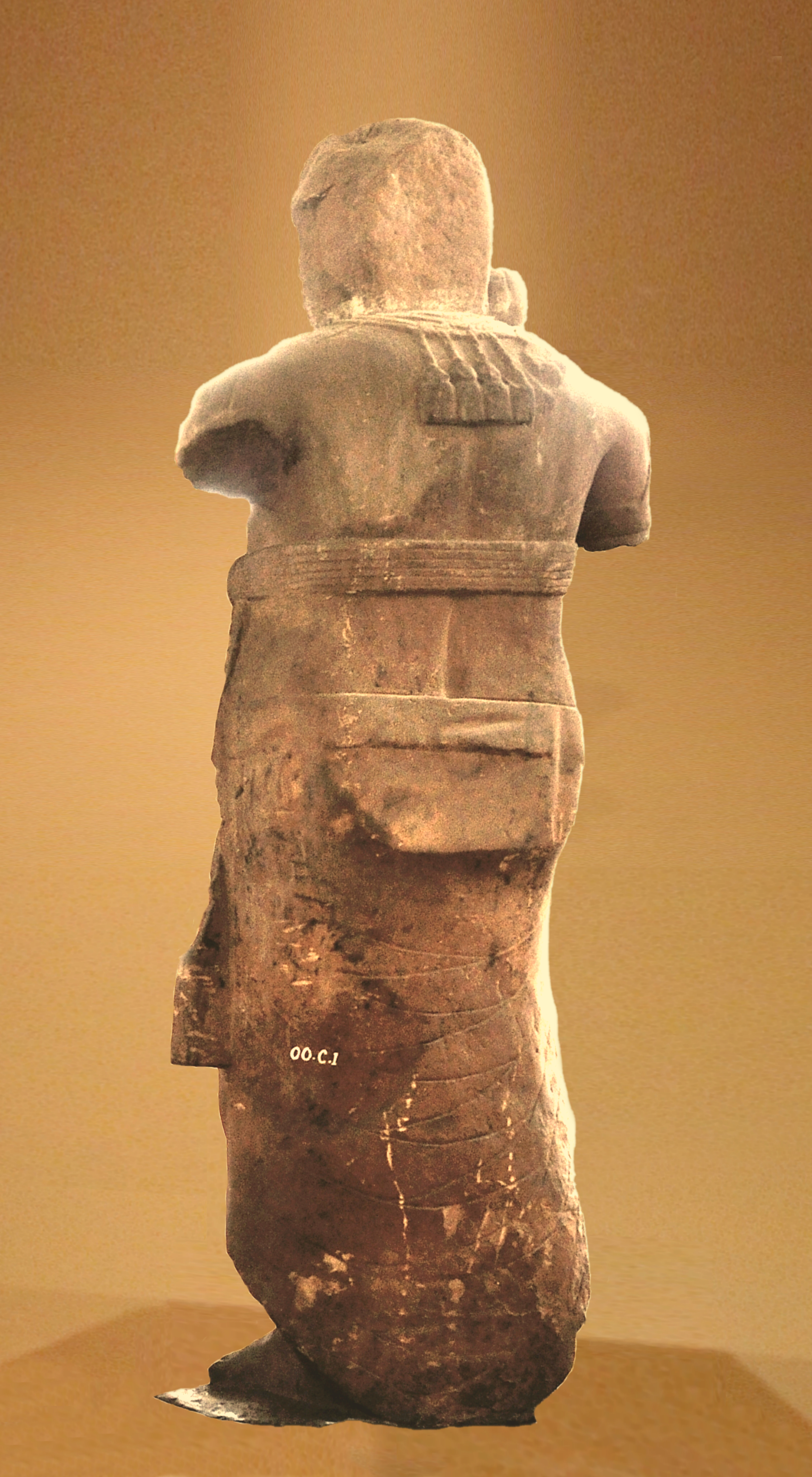
- Front Back The "Parkam Yaksha" Manibhadra. 150 BCE. Mathura Museum, GMM C.1
- Size: 2.6 meters
- Writing: Brahmi
- Created: 150 BCE
- Discovered: Parkham, Uttar-Pradesh; 27.287358°N 77.717414°E
- Present location: Mathura Museum, Mathura
- Registration: GMM C.1

Location

The Parkham Yaksha is a colossal statue of a Yaksha, discovered in the area of Parkham, in the vicinity of Mathura, 22.5 kilometers south of the city. The statue, which is an important artefact of the Art of Mathura, is now visible in the Mathura Museum. It has been identified as the Yaksha deity Manibhadra, a popular deity in ancient India.

== Date ==
As mentioned by Ananda Coomaraswamy in the book "Introduction to Indian Art", Parkham Yaksha bears the inscription referring to "Kunika Ajatashatru" who died in 618 BCE. Hence, the Parkham Yaksha can be dated no later than fifth or sixth century BCE. The Parkham Yaksha is datable to period 200 BCE – 50 BCE on paleographic and stylistic grounds. It has also been dated more precisely by Heinrich Lüders, who gives it a mid-2nd century date, and Sonya Rhie Quintanilla who dates it to circa 150 BCE.

== Inscription ==
The statue is 2.6 meters tall, including its base of about 30 centimeters. The badly corroded inscription in early Brahmi script on the top side of the base reads:

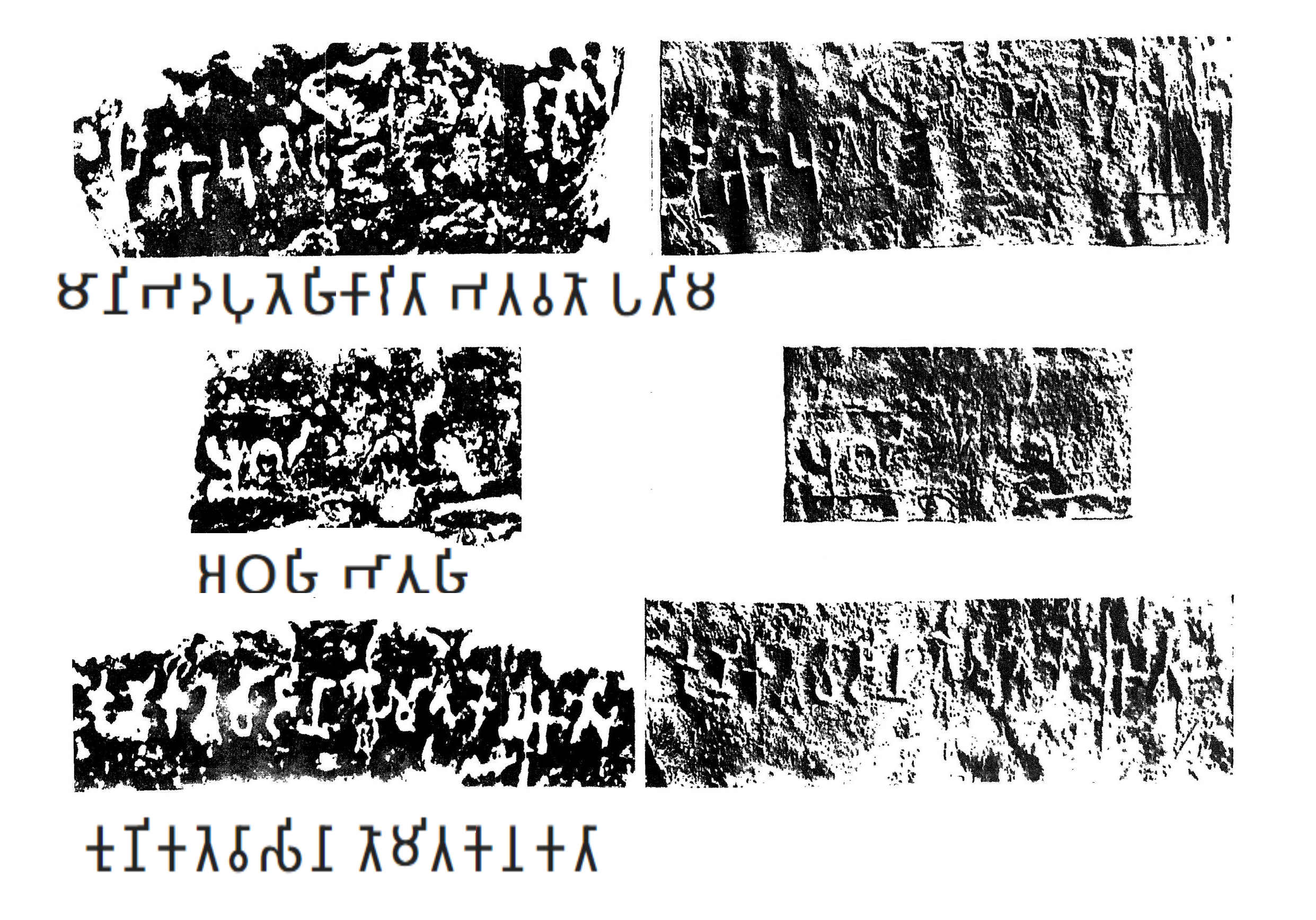
Parkham Yaksha inscription with transliteration, paleographically dated to mid-2nd century BCE.

(𑀫𑀸)𑀦𑀺𑀪𑀤𑀧𑀼𑀢𑁂(𑀳𑀺) 𑀓𑀸(𑀭𑀺)(𑀢𑀸) (𑀪)𑀢(𑀯)𑀢𑁄 (𑀧𑀢𑀺𑀫)
(Mā)nibhadapuge[h]i kā(r)i(t)ā (bha)ga[va]to (patimā)
𑀅𑀞(𑀳𑀺) (𑀪𑀸𑀢𑀼)𑀳𑀺
aṭha(h)i [bhātu]hi
𑀓𑀼𑀡𑀺𑀓𑀢𑁂𑀯𑀸𑀲𑀺𑀦𑀸 𑀢𑁄𑀫𑀺𑀢𑀓𑁂𑀦 𑀓𑀢𑀸
Kuṇikatevāsinā Gomitakena katā

"The image of the Holy One was caused to be made by eight brothers, members of the Manibhada congregation. It has been made by Gomitaka, the pupil of Kunika.

— Heinrich Lüders, Mathura inscriptions

This inscription thus indicates that the statue represents the Yaksa Manibhadra, and the title "Bhagavat" ("Lord" or "Holy One") suggests that the statue represents a divinity in its own right, which was the subject of worship, independently of Buddhism or Jainism with which it was later associated.

== Style ==
The analysis of the statue has suggested that the Parkham Yaksha probably held his left arm akimbo, while holding a bag filled with square coins, as seen in the Manibhadra statue of Pawaya.

The Parkham Yaksha is one of four known occurrences of the Yaksha Manibhadra in inscriptions: one in Parkham near Mathura, one in Pawaya near Gwalior, one in Masharfa and one in Bhītā near Kausambi. It appears Manibhadra was considered as a protector of itinerant merchants, a provider of wealth, and a protector against smallpox.

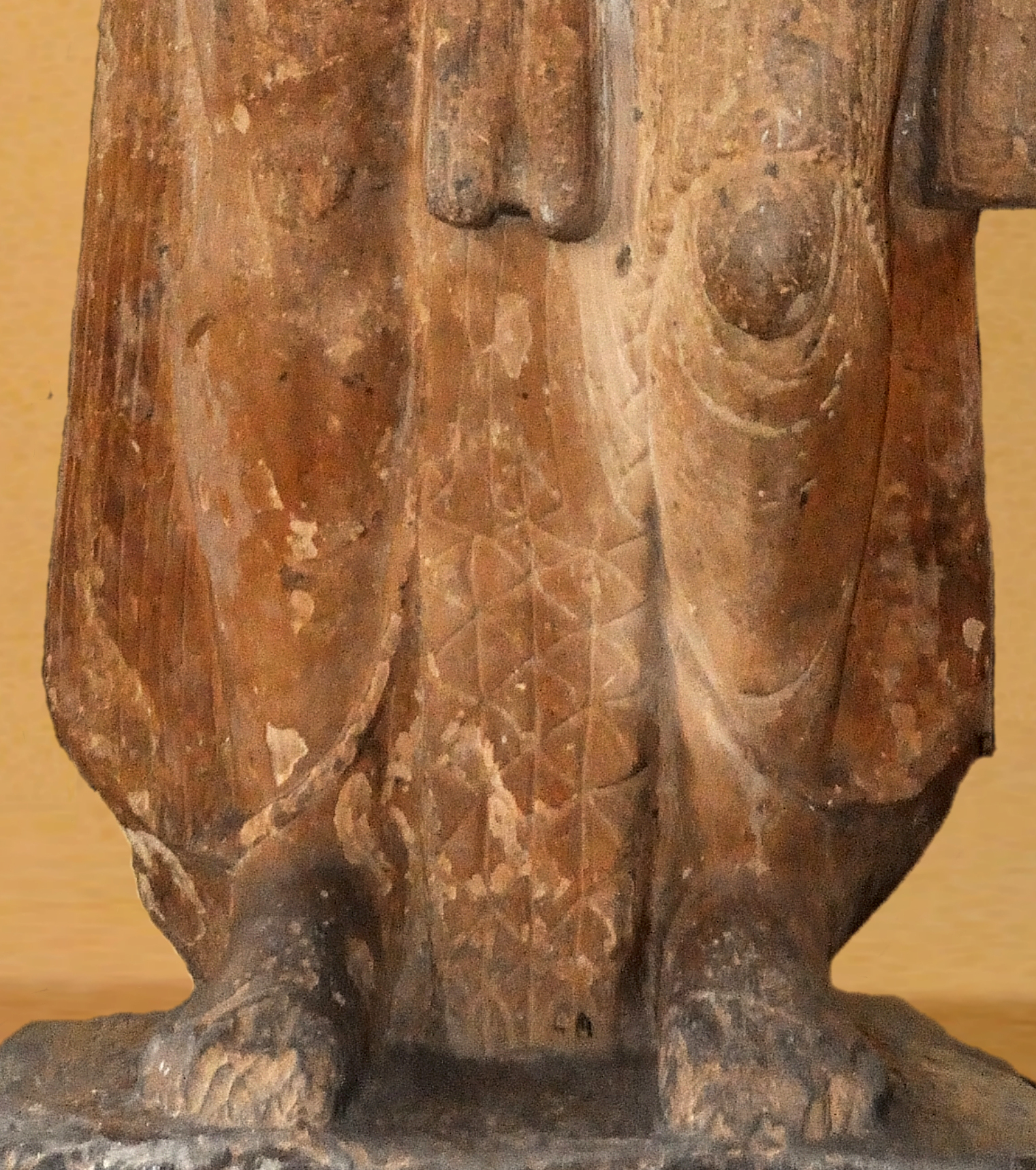
Parkham Yaksha, detail of the "Hellenistic" drapery. 150 BCE

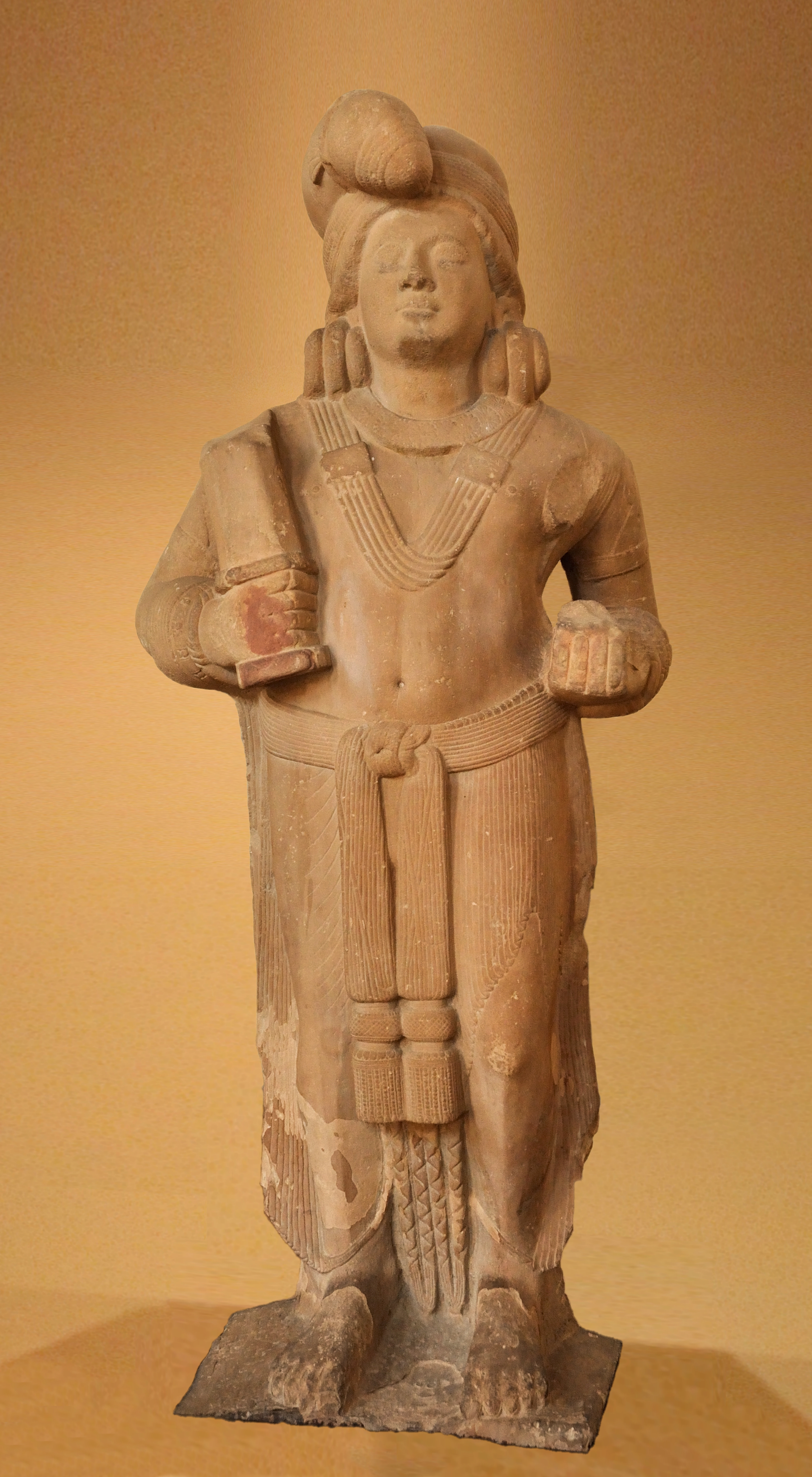
A similar statue, but in a much better state of preservation, the Mudgarpani Yaksha

== See also ==
- Yaksha
- Pañcika
- Kubera

== Sources ==
- Mathew, Ammu (2008). ManoramaTell me why No.32. Monorama Press. ISBN 978-0-9750-4300-4.
- Hopkins, Edward Washburn (1915). Epic mythology. Strassburg K.J. Trübner. ISBN 0-8426-0560-6.
- Sutherland, Gail Hinich (1991). The disguises of the demon: the development of the Yakṣa in Hinduism and Buddhism. SUNY Press. ISBN 0-7914-0622-9.
