= Parkham (disambiguation) =

Parkham is a village in Devon, England.

Parkham may also refer to:

- Parkham, Tasmania, a locality in Tasmania, Australia
- Parkham, Uttar Pradesh, a village and archaeological site in Uttar Pradesh, India
