= Mudgar =

Type of mace from India

"Mudgarpani" Yaksha
Mathura, 100 BCE
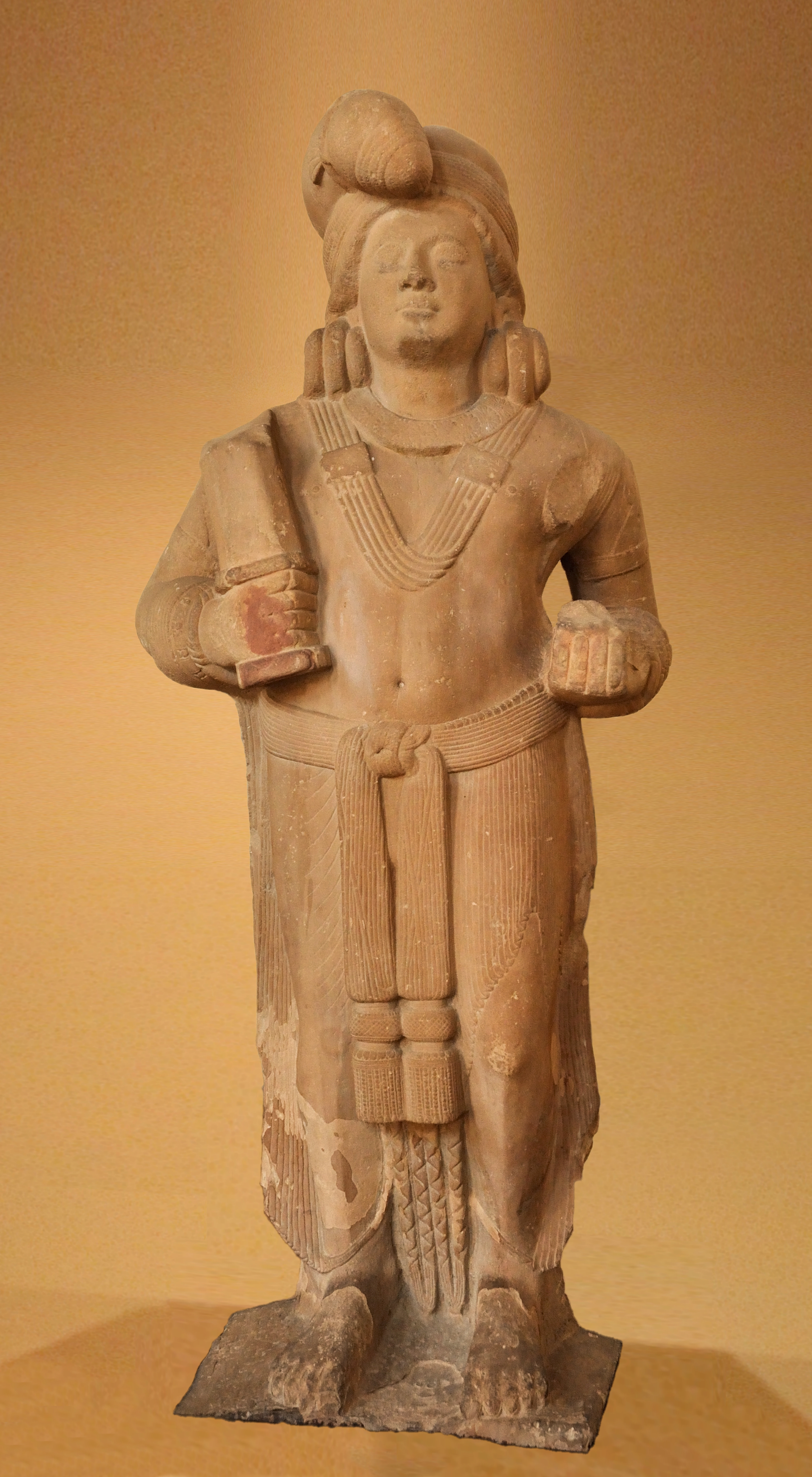
Mudgarpani ("Mace-holder") Yaksha, Art of Mathura, 100 BCE. This colossal statue in the round is 1.96 meters tall. The right hand holds a mudgar, the left hand used to support a small standing devotee or child joining hands in prayer.

A mudgar (Sanskrit: मुद्गर, romanized: mudgara) or mudgara, is a type of gada (mace) from India, and it is generally considered to be made of wood, but can also be made of iron.

== Usage ==
The mudgar appears in ancient Indian sculptures, where it is commonly held by Yaksha deities, known as mudgarpani (mudgarapāṇi; mudgar-holders).

An ancient Jain story named the Antagadadasao tells the story of a man named Ajjunaka who was worshipping the image of the "Yaksa who held a mace", when he was attacked by five bandits, an event which shook his devotion to the Yashka. Afterwards the Yaksa possessed Ajjunaka, giving him the strength to kill the five bandits.

Nowadays, for training purposes when using Indian clubs, one or two wooden gada ("mudgar"), reaching up to 70 kilograms in weight, can be used: they can be swung behind the back in several different ways; this is particularly useful for building grip strength and shoulder endurance.

== Examples ==
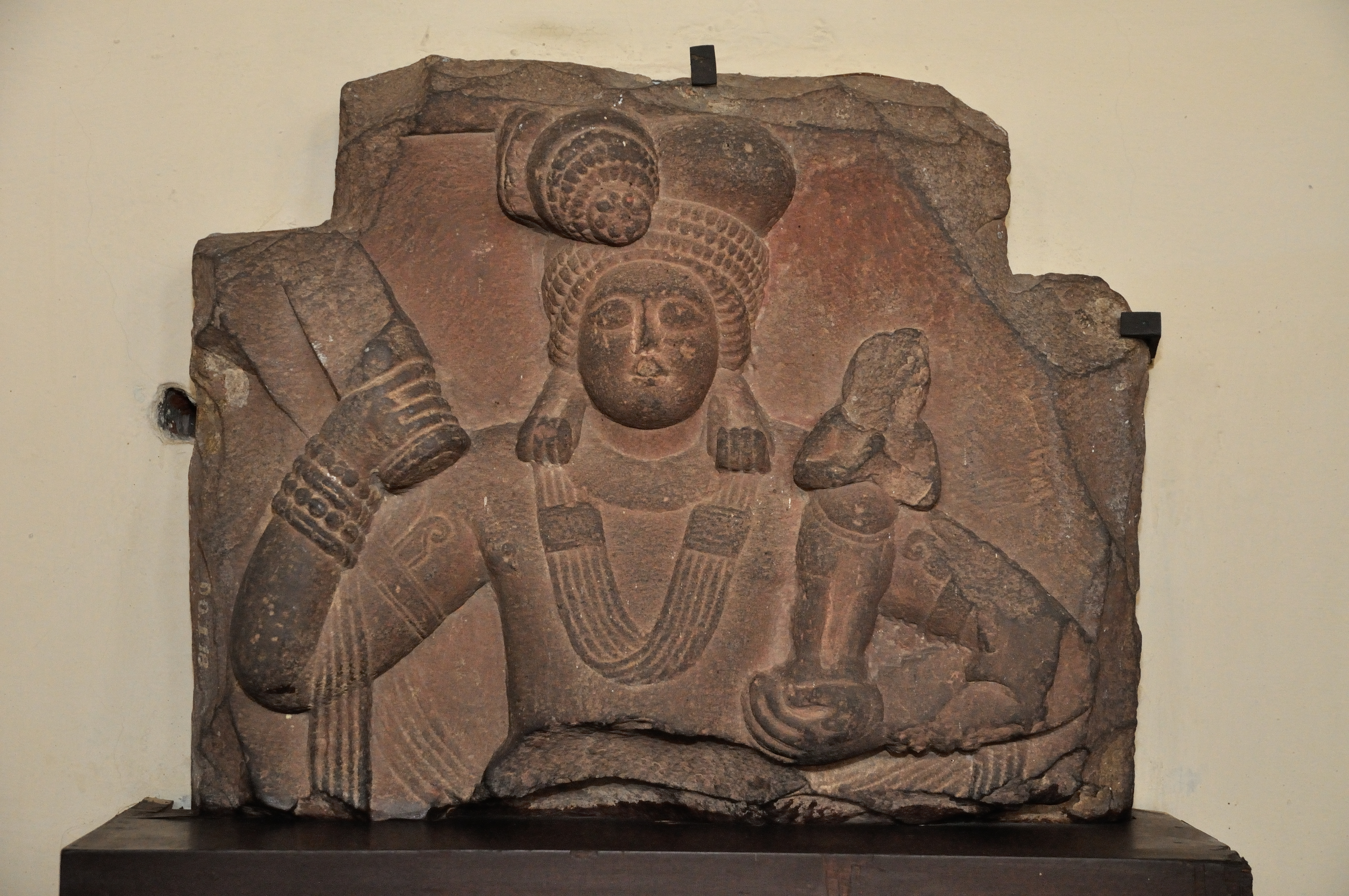
Yaksha holding mudgar and child. Art of Mathura, 100 BCE.

== See also ==
- Mace (bludgeon)
