= Yaksha =

Nature spirits associated with Asian mythologies

Yaksha

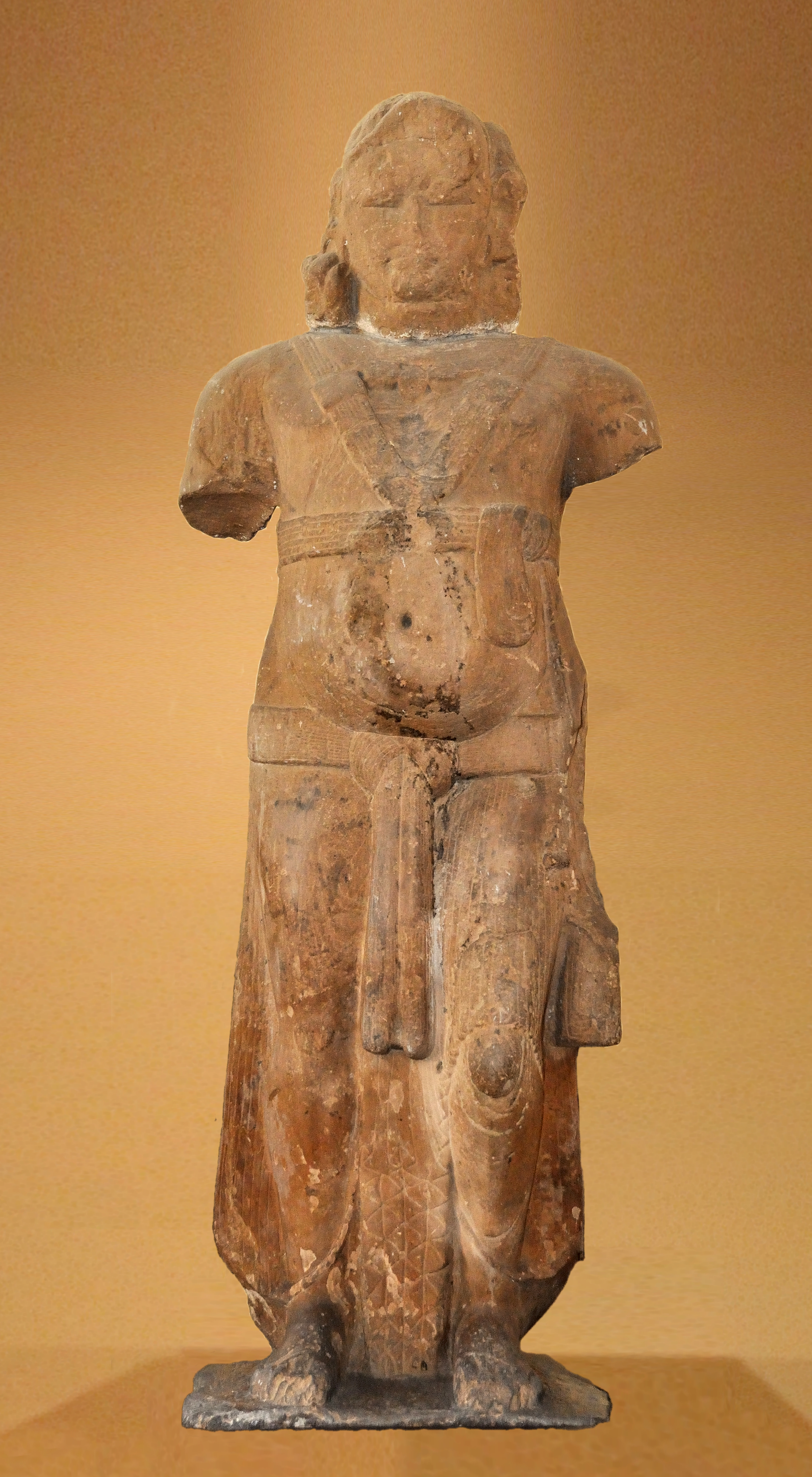
"Parkham Yaksha" Manibhadra, 150 BCE

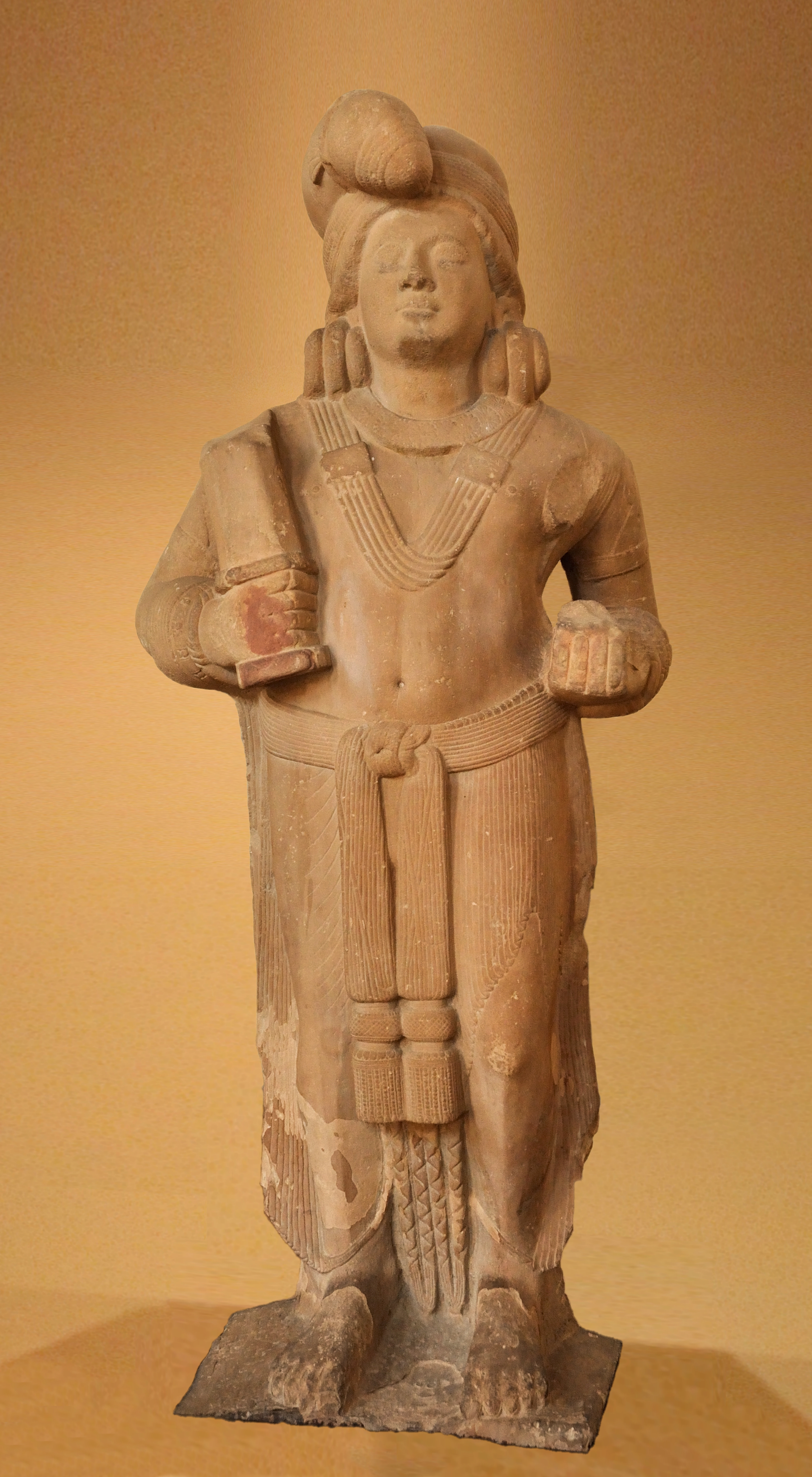
"Mudgarpani Yaksha", 100 BCE

Remains of the colossal statues of the Parkham Yaksha (150 BCE) and the Mudgarpani ("Mace-holder") Yaksha (100 BCE), Mathura. These colossal statues stand around two metres tall. The Mudgarpani Yaksha holds a mudgar mace in the right hand, and the left hand used to support a small standing devotee or child joining hands in prayer.
Art of Mathura, Mathura Museum

The Yakshas (Sanskrit: यक्ष, IAST: Yakṣa, Pali: Yakkha) are a broad class of nature spirits in Hindu mythology which are associated with water, trees, forests, wilderness, treasure, and fertility. They are usually considered benevolent, and sometimes mischievous or capricious. They appear in Hindu, Jain and Buddhist texts, as well as ancient and medieval temples of South Asia and Southeast Asia as guardian deities. The feminine form of the word is IAST: Yakṣī or Yakshini (Sanskrit: यक्षिणी, IAST: Yakṣiṇī; Pali: Yakkhini).

In Hindu, Jain and Buddhist texts, the yakṣas have a dual personality. A yakṣa may be an inoffensive nature spirit associated with woods and mountains, or a darker version of the yakṣa which is a kind of Bhoota (ghost) that haunts the wilderness and waylays and devours travellers, similar to the rakṣasas.

A unique cultural dance form related to the Yakshas is Yakshagana. Yakshagana is a traditional stage performance, found in Dakshina Kannada, Udupi, Kasaragod district and Uttara Kannada, Shimoga and western Chikmagalur districts, in the state of Karnataka.

== Early yakshas ==
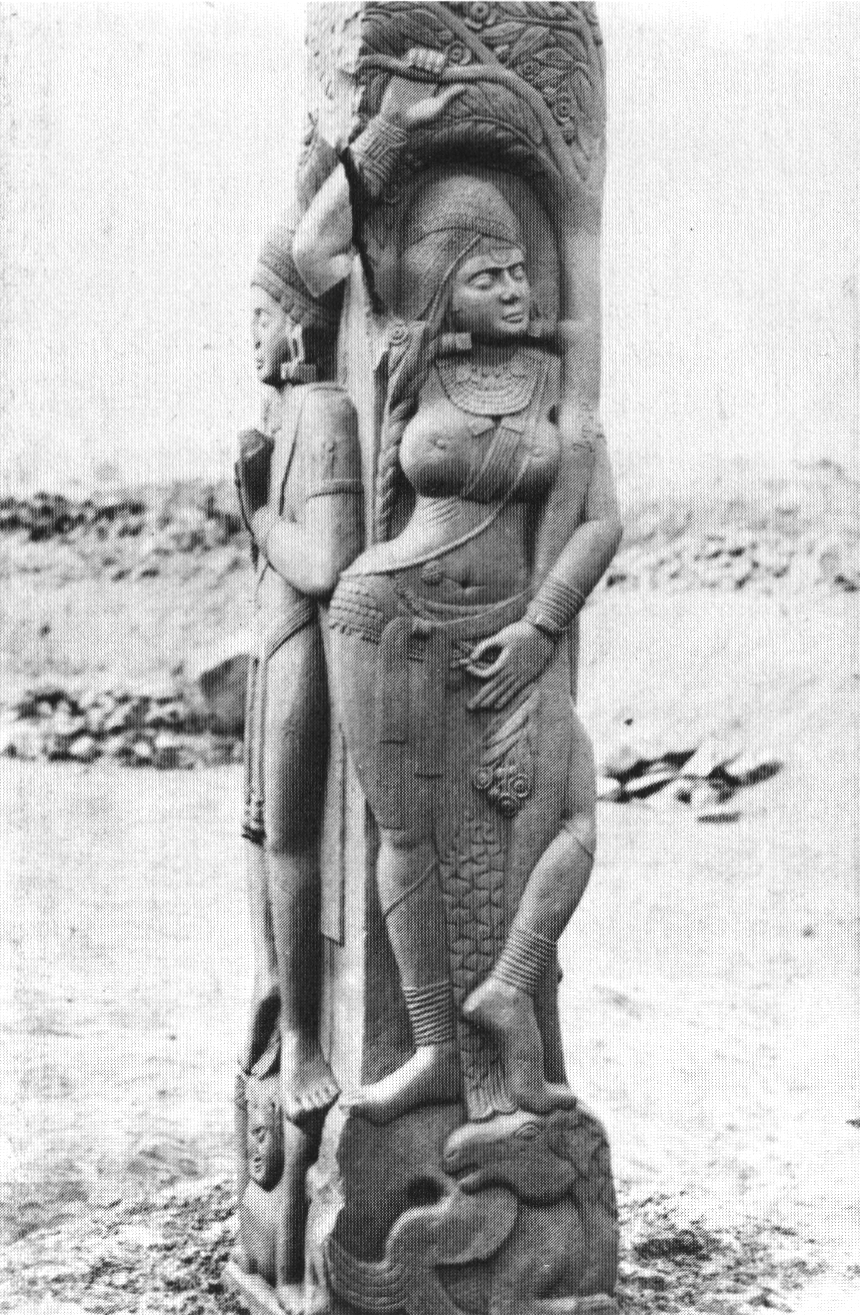
Yaksi from Bharhut

Yakshas appear in Hindu, Jain and Buddhist texts. Several monumental yakshas are known from the time of the Maurya Empire period. They are variously dated from around the 3rd century BCE to the 1st century BCE. These statues are monumental (usually around 2 metres tall), and often bear inscriptions related to their identification as yakshas. They are considered as the first known monumental stone sculptures in India. Two of these monumental yakshas are known from Patna, one from Vidisha and one from Parkham, as well as one yakshini from Vidisha. The yakṣas may have originally been the tutelary deity of a city, district, lake, or well. Their worship, together with popular belief in nagas (serpent deities), feminine fertility deities, and mother goddesses, may have had its origin among the early Hindu people of India. Yaksha worship coexisted with the priest-conducted sacrifices of the Vedic period. They were later viewed as the steward deities of the earth and the wealth buried beneath.

=== Kubera ===
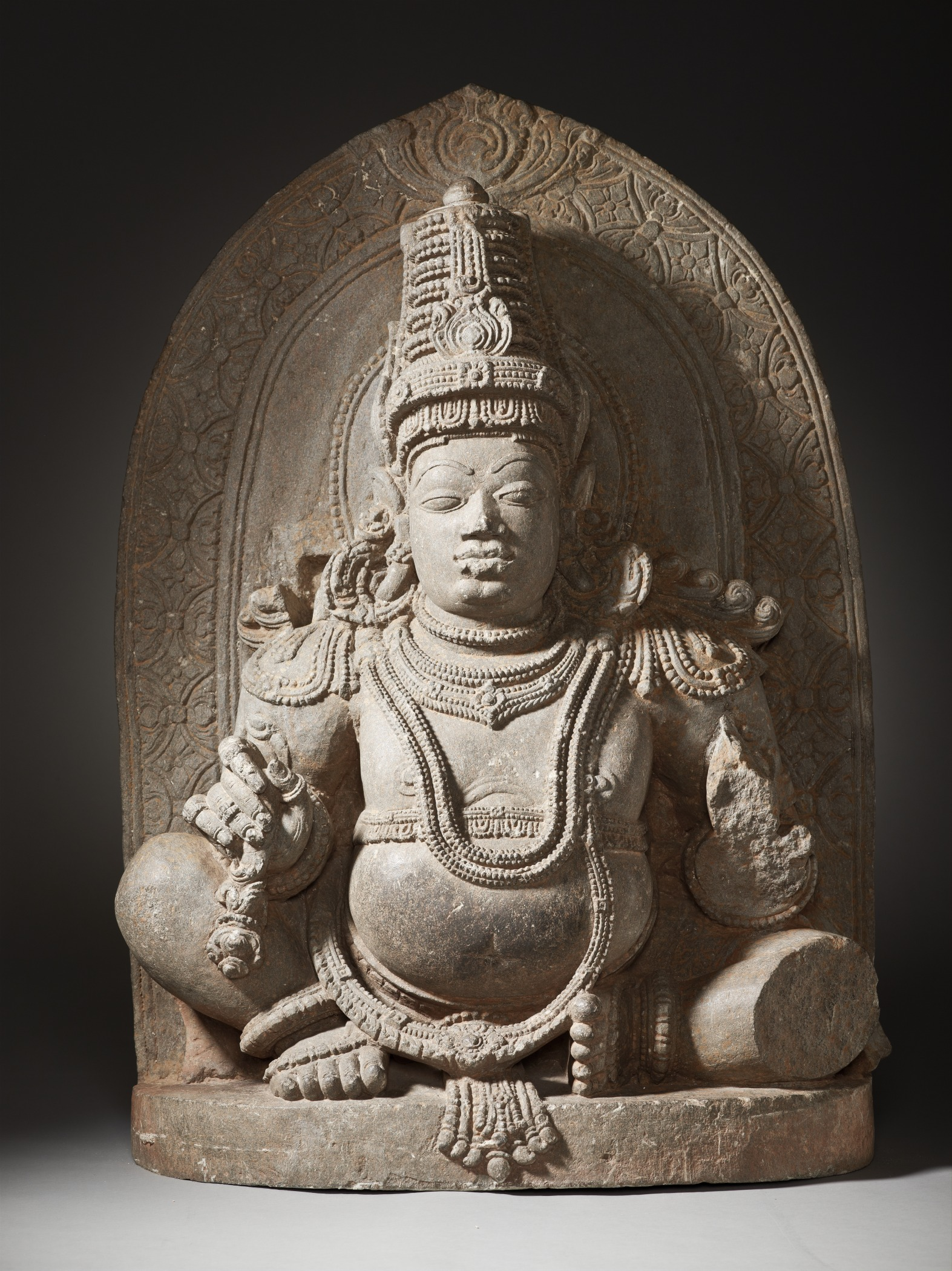
Kubera, the God of Riches, LACMA

In Hindu, Buddhist and Jain Religion, Kubera, the god of wealth and prosperity, is considered the king of the yakshas and protector of the world (Lokapāla). In Buddhism, he is equated with Vaiśravaṇa.

His many epithets extol him as the overlord of numerous semi-divine species and the owner of the treasures of the world. Kubera is often depicted with a plump body, adorned with jewels, carrying a money-pot and a club. His vahana (vehicle) is the mongoose. He is often seen with Lakshmi, the Hindu goddess of wealth, fortune and prosperity.

== In Buddhism ==
Translations of Yaksha
- Sanskrit: यक्ष (IAST: yakṣa)
- Pali: Yakkha
- Burmese: ယက္ခ (MLCTS: yakkha)
- Chinese: 夜叉 (Pinyin: yèchā)
- Japanese: 夜叉(やしゃ) (Rōmaji: yasha)
- Khmer: យក្ស (UNGEGN: yoks)
- Korean: 야차 (RR: yacha)
- Sinhala: යක්ෂ (yakṣa)
- Tagalog: Yakksa
- Tamil: இயக்கர் (yākka)
- Tibetan: གནོད་སྦྱིན་ (gnod sbyin)
- Thai: ยักษ์ (RTGS: yak)
- Vietnamese: dạ xoa

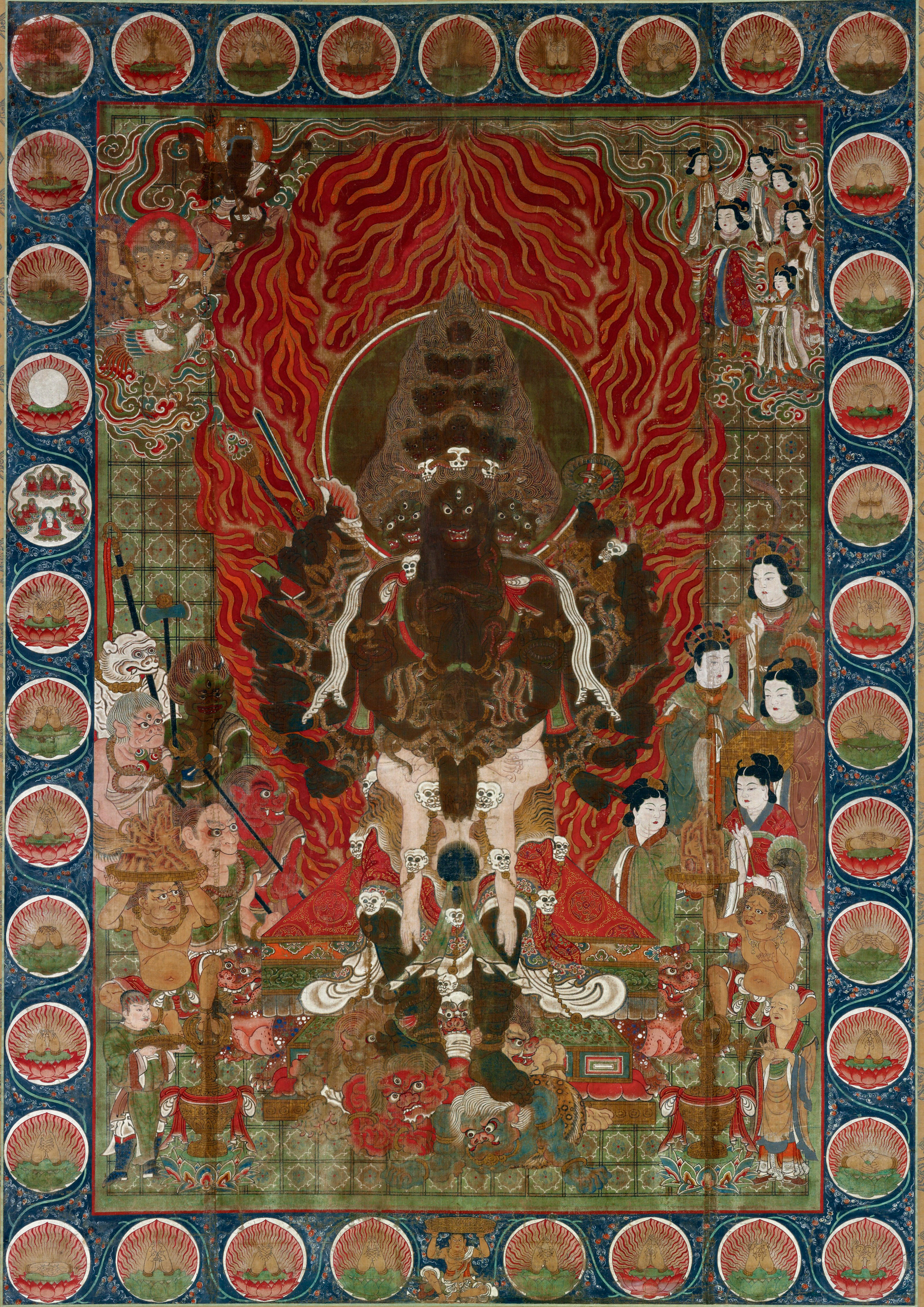
Painting of Āṭavaka, a yaksha who challenged the Buddha

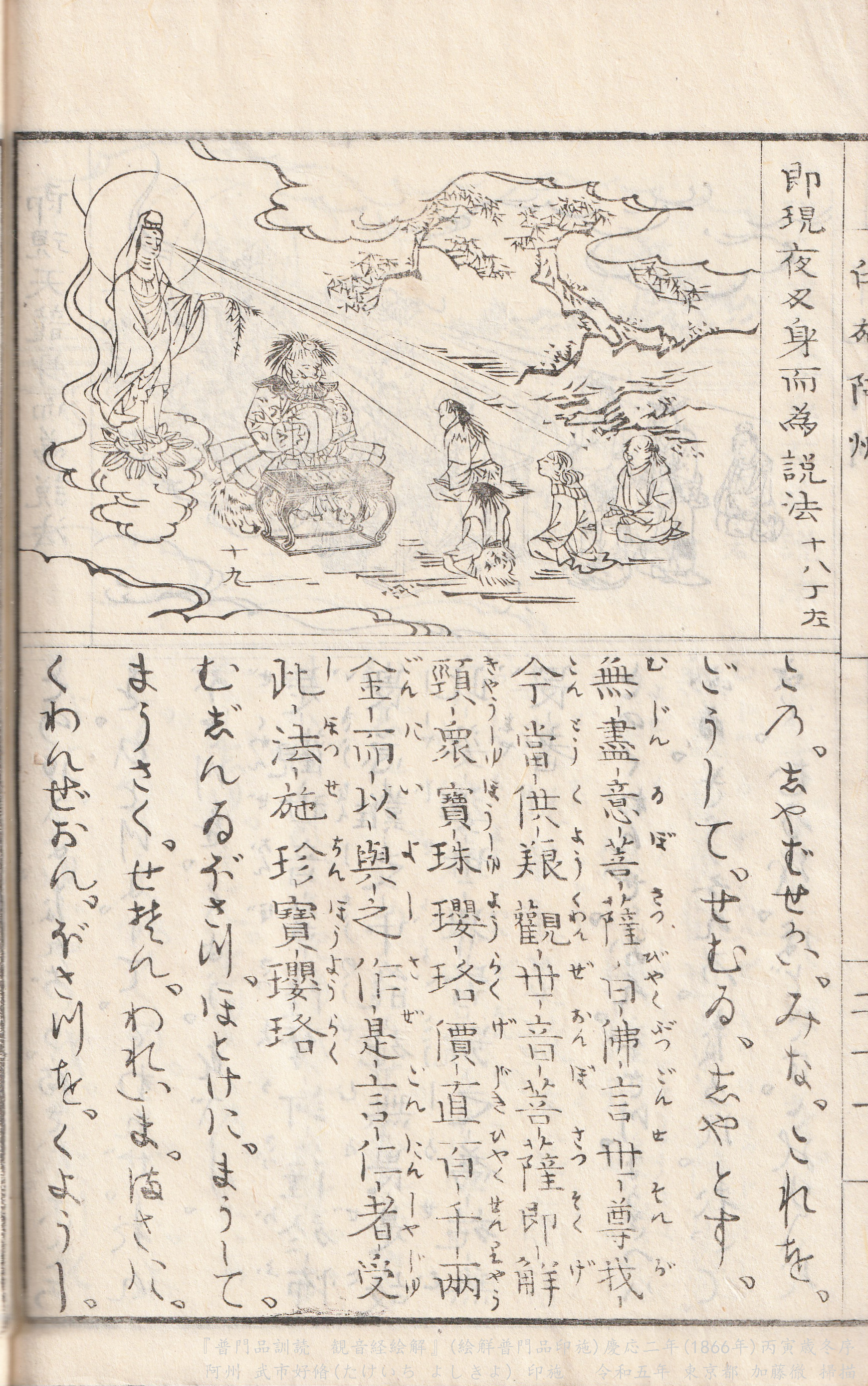
An illustration from an 1866 Japanese book. A yaksha, who is an incarnation of Bodhisattva Kannon, gives a sermon to folks.

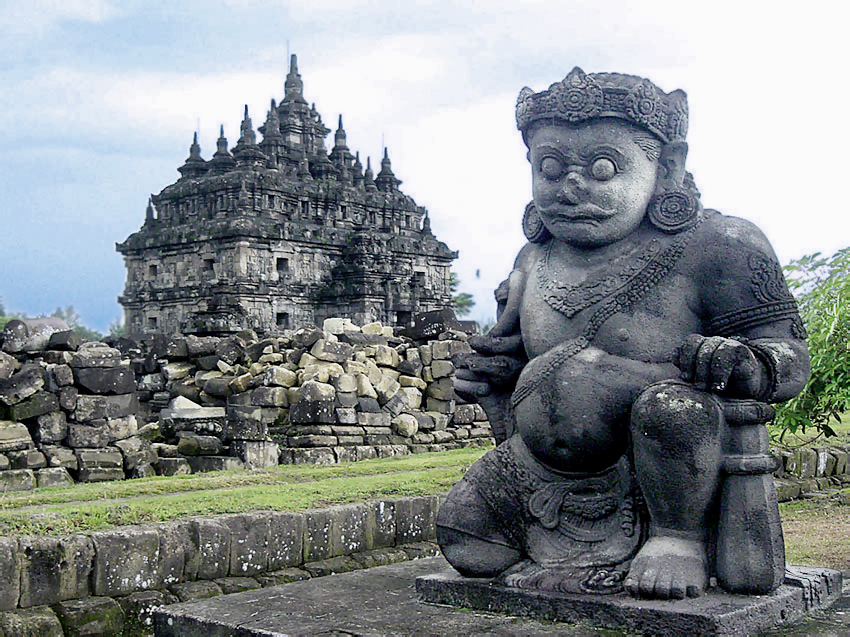
A yaksha as a gate guardian (dvarapala) at Plaosan temple in Indonesia

In Buddhist literature, the yakṣa are the attendants of Vaiśravaṇa, the guardian of the northern quarter, a beneficent god who protects the righteous. The term also refers to the Twelve Heavenly Generals who guard Bhaiṣajyaguru, the Medicine Buddha. The yakshas of many Buddhist stories are ugly ogres, reborn in that form because of sins committed during their past lives as humans.

One such malevolent yaksha, Silesaloma, appears in the Jataka tales of the Pali Buddhist canon. In the story "Prince Five-Weapons and the Sticky-Haired Demon", Silesaloma is described as being the height of a palm tree, with sharp teeth and two yellow tusks, and a coat of thick, matted fur. A bodhisattva named Prince Panchayudha (Five-Weapons) attempted to kill Silesaloma, but all his attacks, from both his weapons and his bare hands, were thwarted by Silesaloma's sticky hair. Ultimately, Prince Panchayudha impressed Silesaloma with his bravery, and the yaksha decided to let him go. Panchayudha explained that Silesaloma's monstrous state was caused by wicked deeds from his past lives, and he taught the yaksha the five precepts, after which Silesaloma renounced violence and transformed into a friendly forest spirit.

The Mahāmāyūrīvidyārājñī Sūtra, a text that dates back to fourth century or earlier (translated from the Sanskrit by Kumarajiva), gives a large list of yakshas that reside in the classical cities of ancient India who are invoked for the protection of the Buddhist Dharma:

"The deity Krakucchanda resides in Pataliputra.
Aparajita resides in Sthuno.
The great yaksha Bhadra resides in Saila.
The great deity Manava resides in Uttara.
The great sage Vajrapani though lives in Rajagrha
Often dwells in Mount Grdhrakuta.
The deity Garuda resides in the Vipula mountain.
Citragupta resides in Citemukha.
The yaksha Vakula resides in Rajagrha.
...
The yaksha king Mahagiri resides in Girinagara.
The yaksha Vasava resides in Vaidisa.
The yaksha Karttikeya resides in Rohitaka.
This yaksha Kumara is renowned in the great city.
...
Vaisravana who resides in the city Alakavati,
Located along the jewelled stairway of the Buddha's descent,
Is surrounded by billions of gods and goddesses.
Such yakshas command huge and powerful contingents of troops
To subjugate adversaries and enemies,
Conquering all.
They are famous throughout all directions.
Imbued with great dignity and virtue,
They come to aid
In the battles between the heavens and asuras.

These deities of virtues and great yaksha generals are located everywhere in Jambudvipa. They uphold and protect the Buddhadharma, generating compassion."

== In Jainism ==
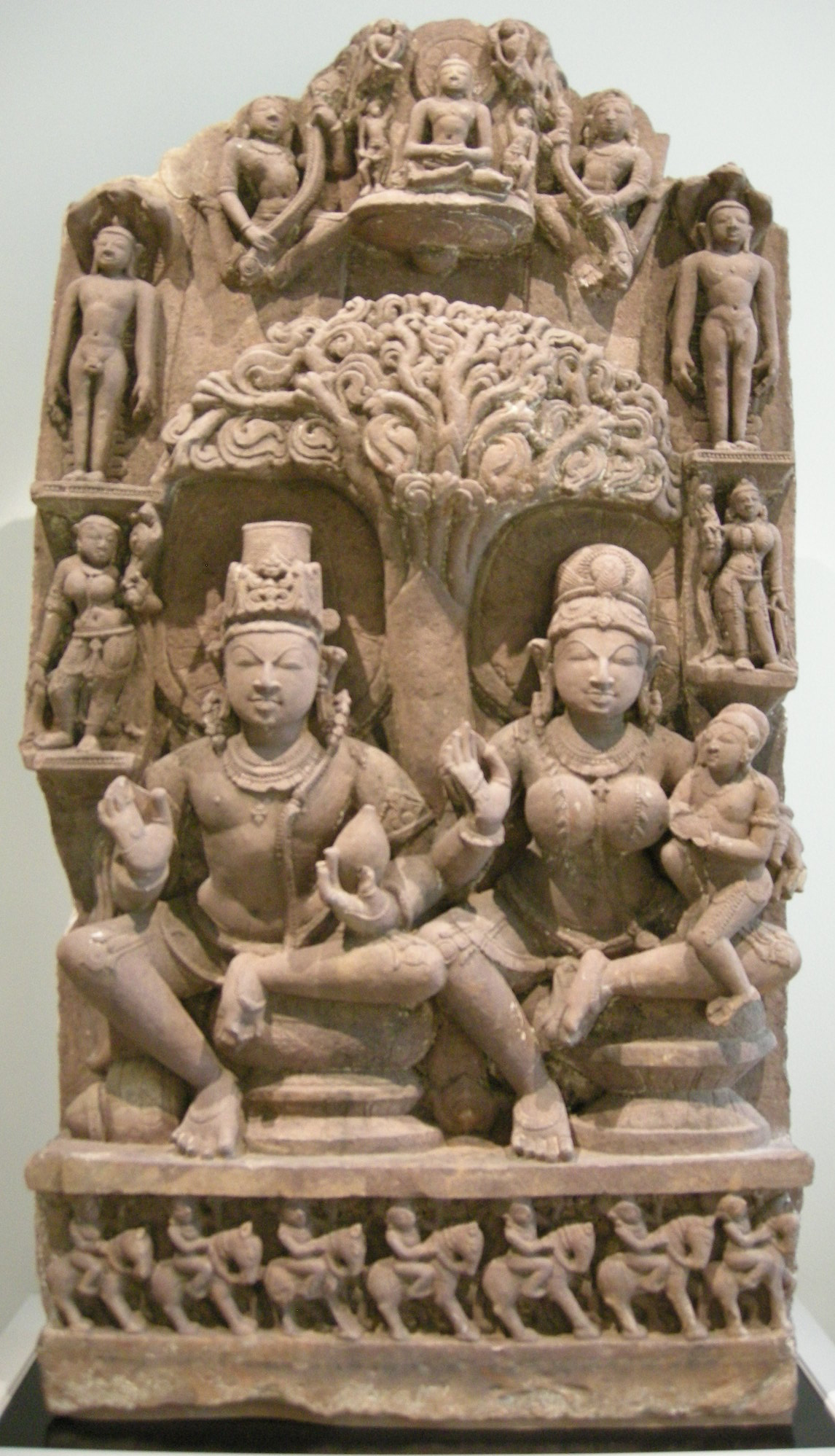
Yaksha and yakshini couple Sarvānubhūti and Kuṣmāṇḍinī, with the Tirthankaras

Jains mainly maintain cult images of Arihants and Tirthankaras, who have conquered the inner passions and attained moksha. Yakshas and yakshinis are found in pair around the cult images of Jinas, serving as guardian deities. The yaksha is generally on the right-hand side of the Jina image while the yakshini is on the left-hand side. They are regarded mainly as devotees of the Jina and have supernatural powers. They are also wandering through the cycles of births and deaths just like the worldly souls, but have supernatural powers.

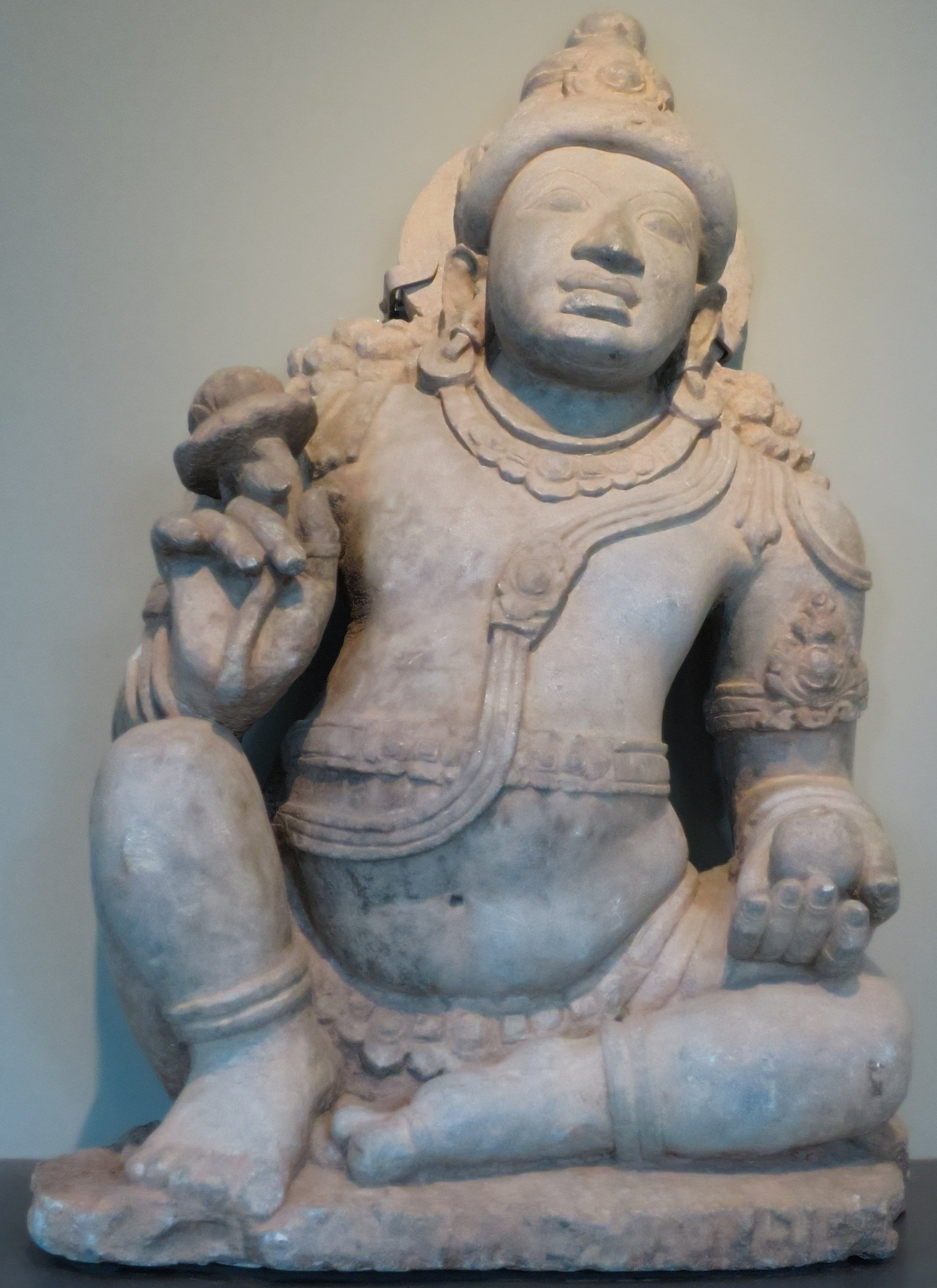
'Digambara Yaksha Sarvahna', Norton Simon Museum, c. 900 CE

The Harivamsapurana (783 CE) refers to them as Shasandevatas. Initially among the yakshas, Manibhadra and Purnabadra yakshas and Bahuputrika yakshini were popular. The yaksha Manibhadra is worshipped by the Jains affiliated with the Tapa Gachchha. During tenth and thirteenth centuries yaksha Saarvanubhuti, or Sarvahna and yakshinis Chakreshvari, Ambika, Padmavati, and Jwalamalini became so popular that independent temples devoted to them were erected.

Yakshas and yakshinis are common among the Murtipujaka Śvētāmbara and Bispanthi Digambara Jains. The Digambara Terapanth movement opposes their worship. Among the Murtipujaka Śvētāmbaras, the Tristutik Gaccha sect (both historical founded by Silagana and Devabhadra, and the modern sect organised by Rajendrasuri) object to the worship of shruta-devatas.

=== Shasan devatas in Jainism ===
In Jainism, there are twenty-four yakshas and twenty-four yakshis that serve as śāsanadevatās for the twenty-four tirthankaras: These yakshas are as follows:

- Gomukha
- Mahayaksha
- Trimukha
- Yaksheshvara or Yakshanayaka
- Tumbaru
- Kusuma
- Varanandi or Matanga
- Vijaya or Shyama
- Ajita
- Brahma or Brahmeshvara
- Ishvara or Yakset
- Kumara
- Dandapani
- Patala
- Kinnara
- Kimpurusha or Garuda
- Gandharva
- Kendra or Yakshendra
- Kubera
- Varuna
- Bhrikuti
- Gomedha or Sarvahna
- Dharanendra or Parshvayaksha
- Matanga

== In poems ==
In Kālidāsa's poem Meghadūta, for instance, the yakṣa narrator is a romantic figure, pining with love for his missing beloved. By contrast, in the didactic Hindu dialogue of the Yakṣapraśnāḥ "Questions of the Yakṣa", it is a tutelary spirit of a lake that challenges Yudhiṣṭhira.

In Mahavamsa poem of Sri Lanka, a local population is given the term Yakkhas. Prince Vijaya encountered the royalty of the yakkhas' queen, Kuveni, in her capital of Lanka pura and conquered them.

== In Nepal ==
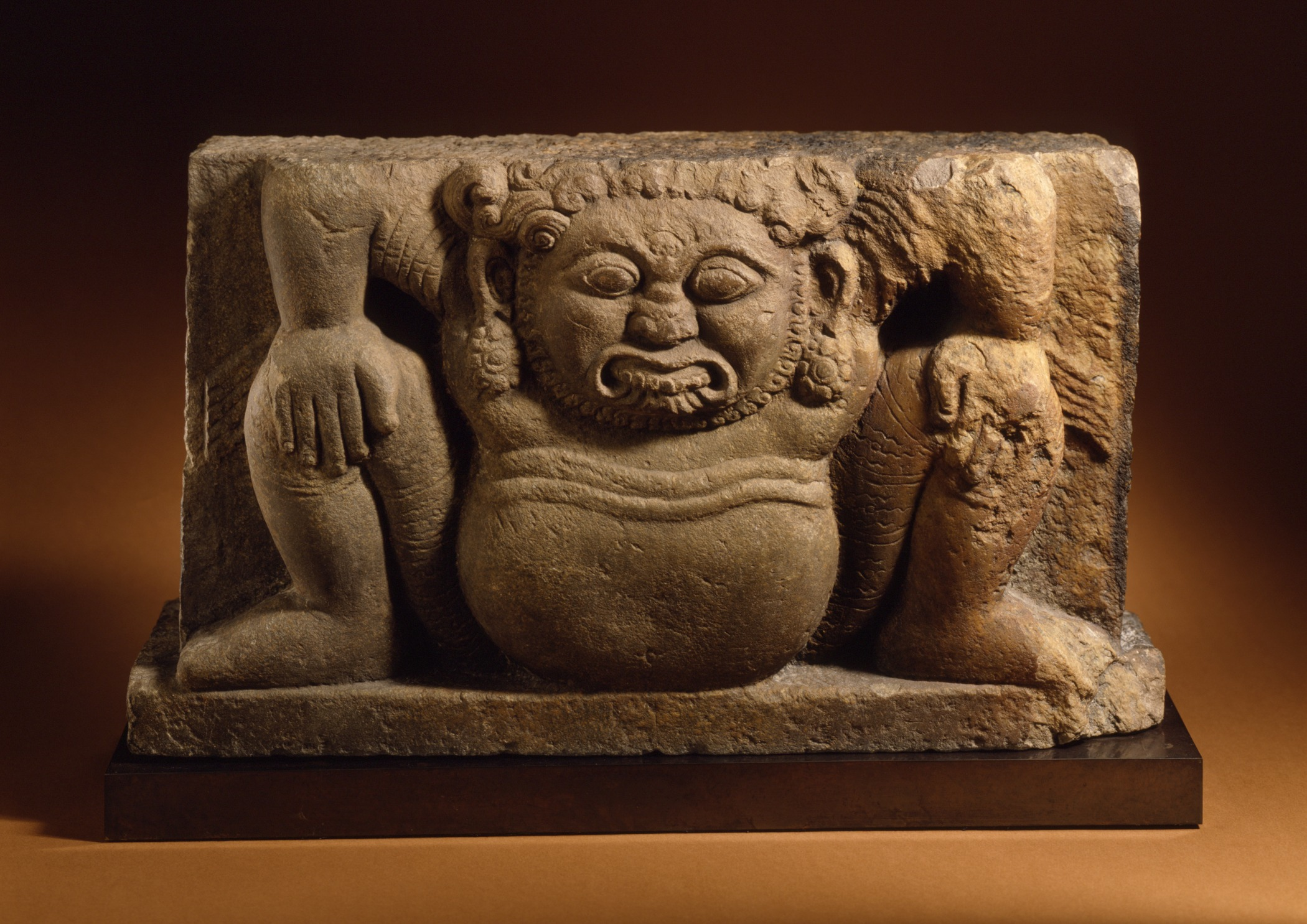
Architectural Support with Squatting Dwarf, 11th century, Los Angeles County Museum of Art

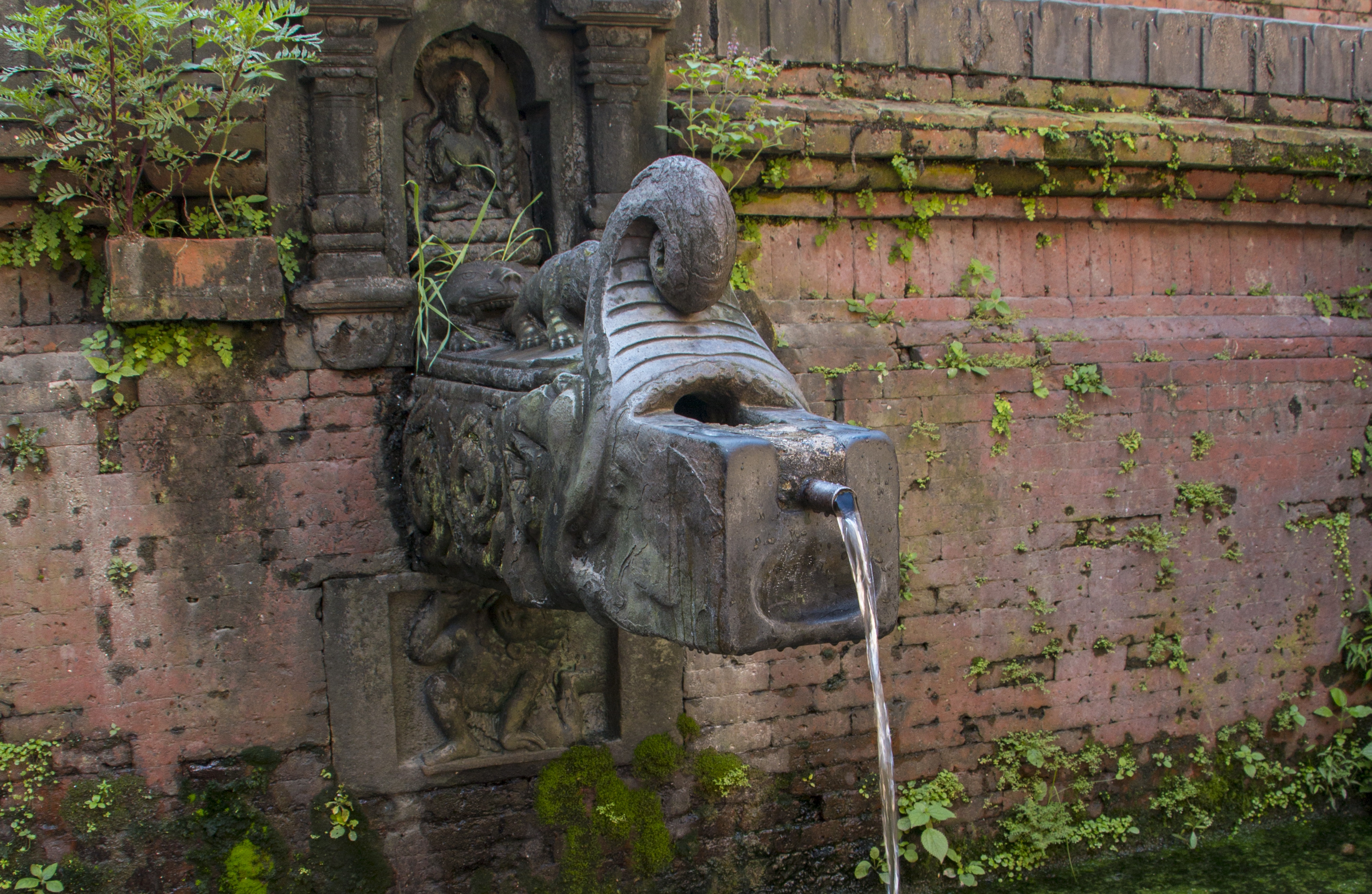
Yaksha beneath the spout of Bhimsen Hiti, Bhaktapur

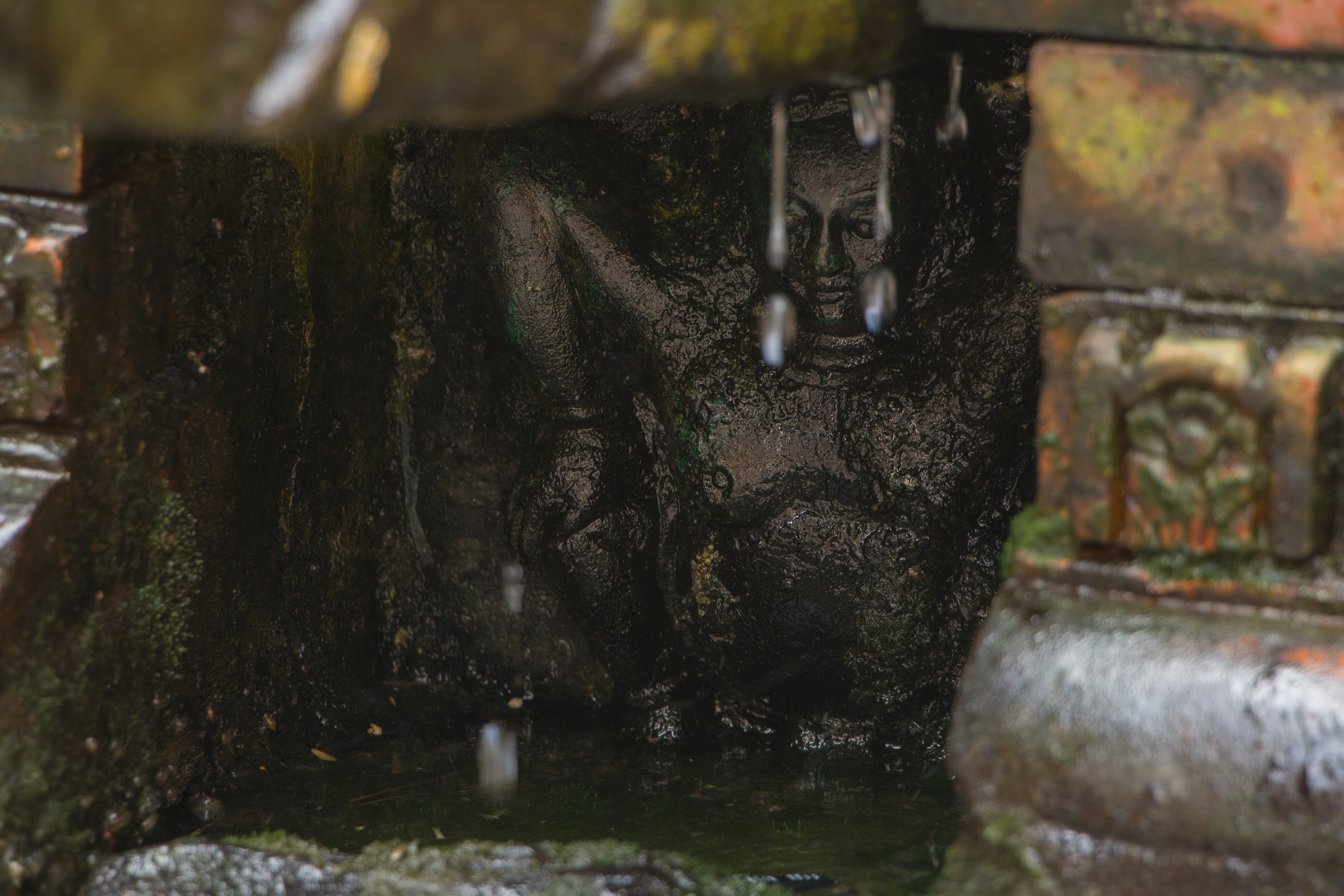
Yaksha at Maru hiti, Kathmandu

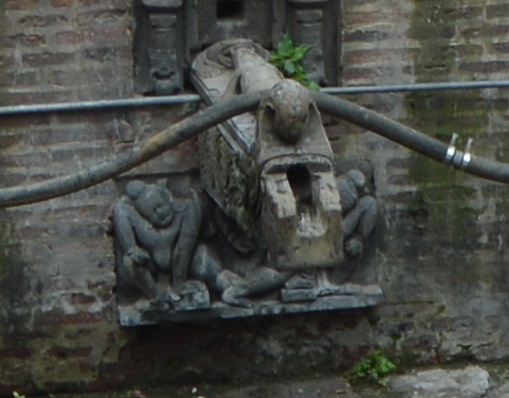
Yakshas beneath a spout of Saraswati Hiti, Chyasal

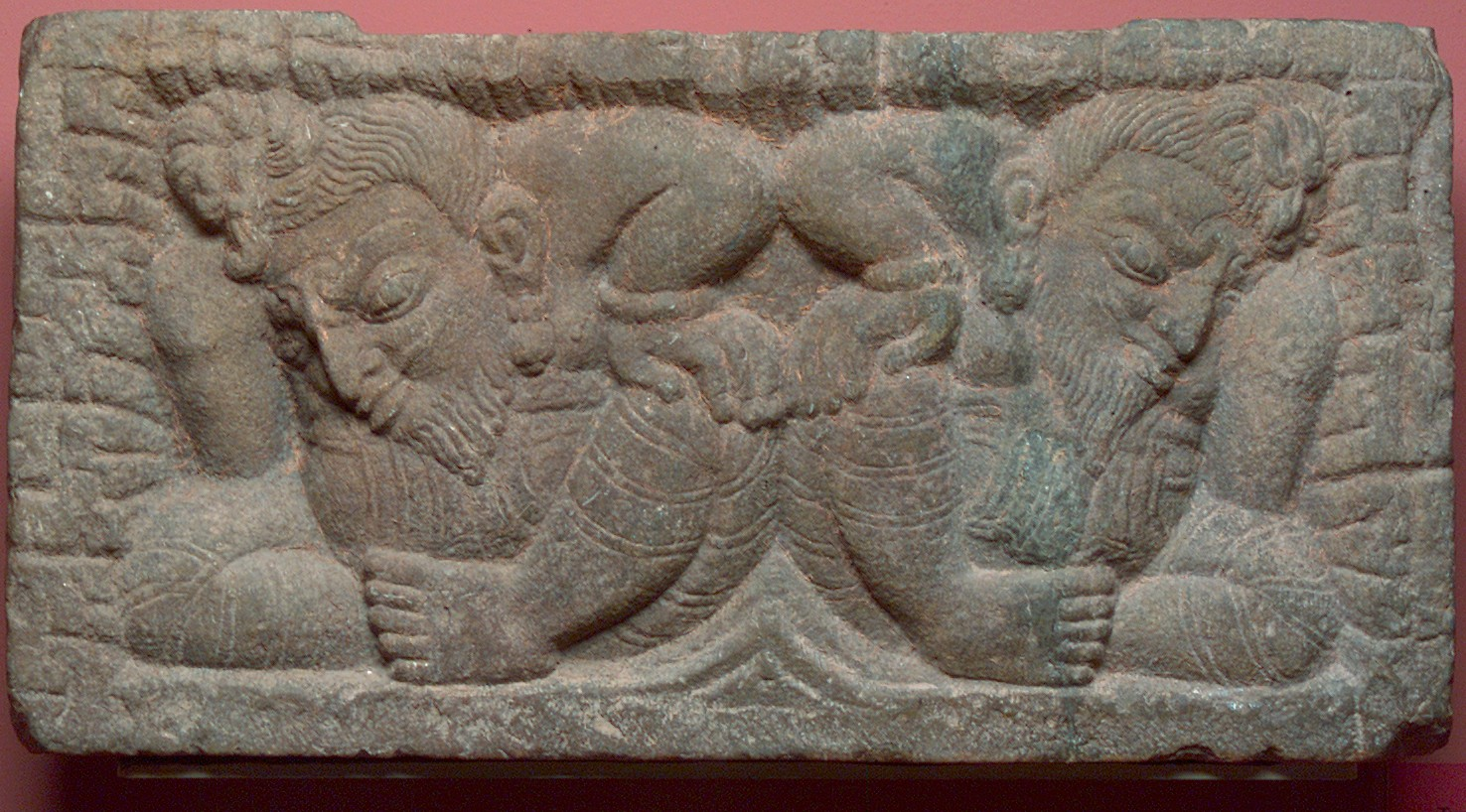
Yakshas relief, 8th–9th century, Metropolitan Museum of Art

In Nepal, squat stone versions of yakshas (sometimes twinned) were used as elements in construction. Their role was that of a caryatid, which supports a part of the building, for example a column. However, they are best known for their appearance under the spouts of ancient drinking fountains, especially fountains built in the Licchavi era (c. 400–750 AD). Bhagiratha sculptures are more commonly found under spouts from the Malla period (c. 1201–1779 AD).

== In Thailand ==
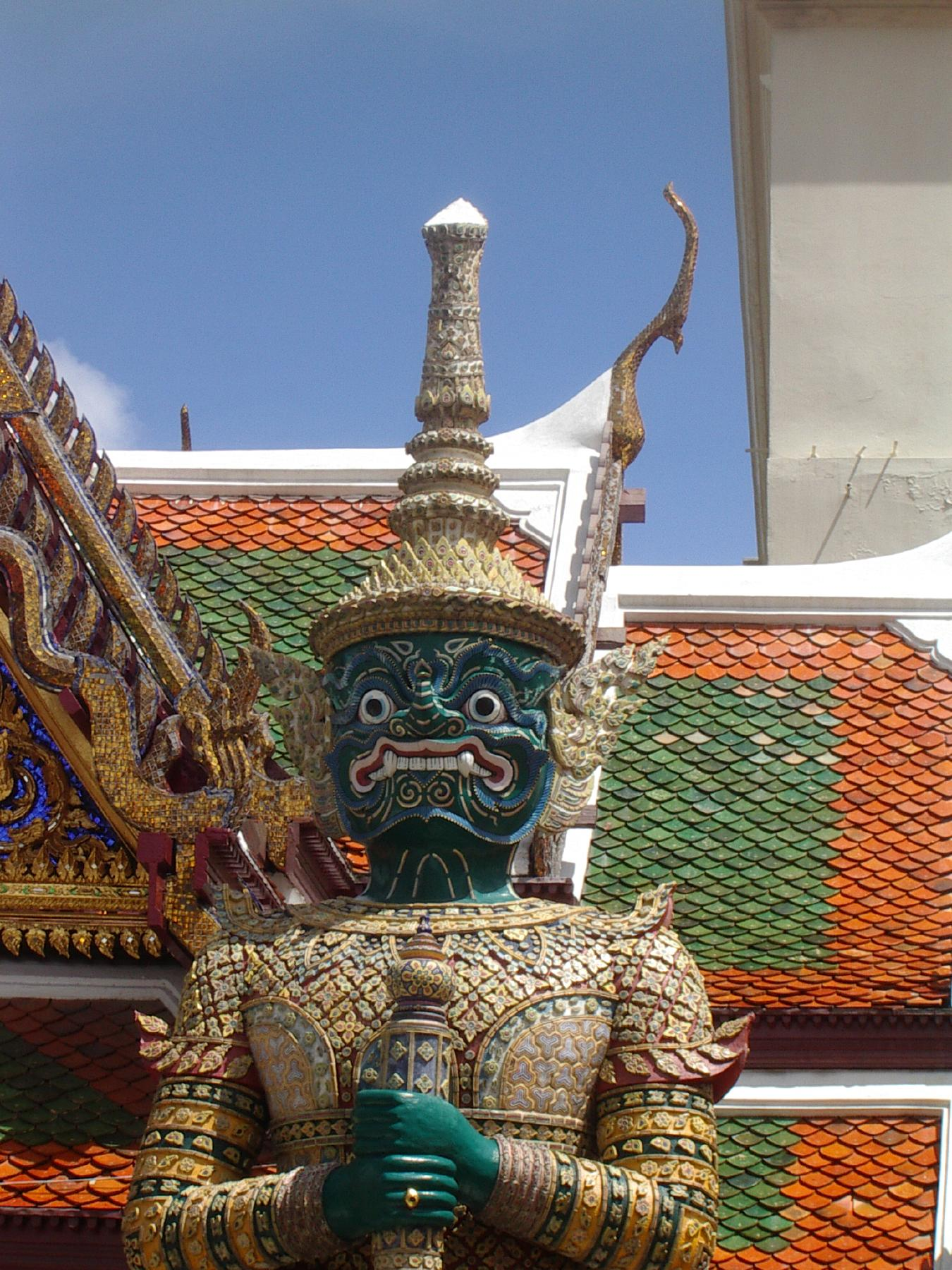
Face of the yakṣa Thotsakhirithon (ทศคีรีธร) at Wat Phra Kaew, Bangkok

Yakshas (Thai: ยักษ์, RTGS: Yak) are an important element in Thai temple art and architecture. They are common as guardians of the gates in Buddhist temples throughout the country since at least the 14th century. Ceramic sculptures of guardian yakshas were produced in Thailand, during the Sukhothai and Ayutthaya periods, between the 14th and 16th centuries, at several kiln complexes in northern Thailand. They are mostly depicted with a characteristic face, having big round bulging eyes and protruding fangs, as well as a green complexion. Yakshas and their female counterparts are common in the Buddhist literature of Thailand, such as in The Twelve Sisters and Phra Aphai Mani. As ogres, giants, and ogresses, yakshas are present as well in Thai folklore.

yo yak "ย ยักษ์" is also used as an illustration in order to name the letter ย, the 34th consonant of the Thai alphabet, according to the traditional letter symbols Thai children use to memorise the alphabet.

== In Sri Lanka ==
Yakshas are regarded as one of the ancient clans of Sri Lanka. The word "Yagasha" has been found in a cave inscription in Tamketiya in Nailgala, Kaltota written in early Brahmi script. Professor Raj Somadeva translates the word as 'belonging to Yakshas' or 'who wrote this inscription are Yakshas'. In Sinhalese, Demons are also known as yakshayo (Singular: Yakshaya).

== Gallery ==
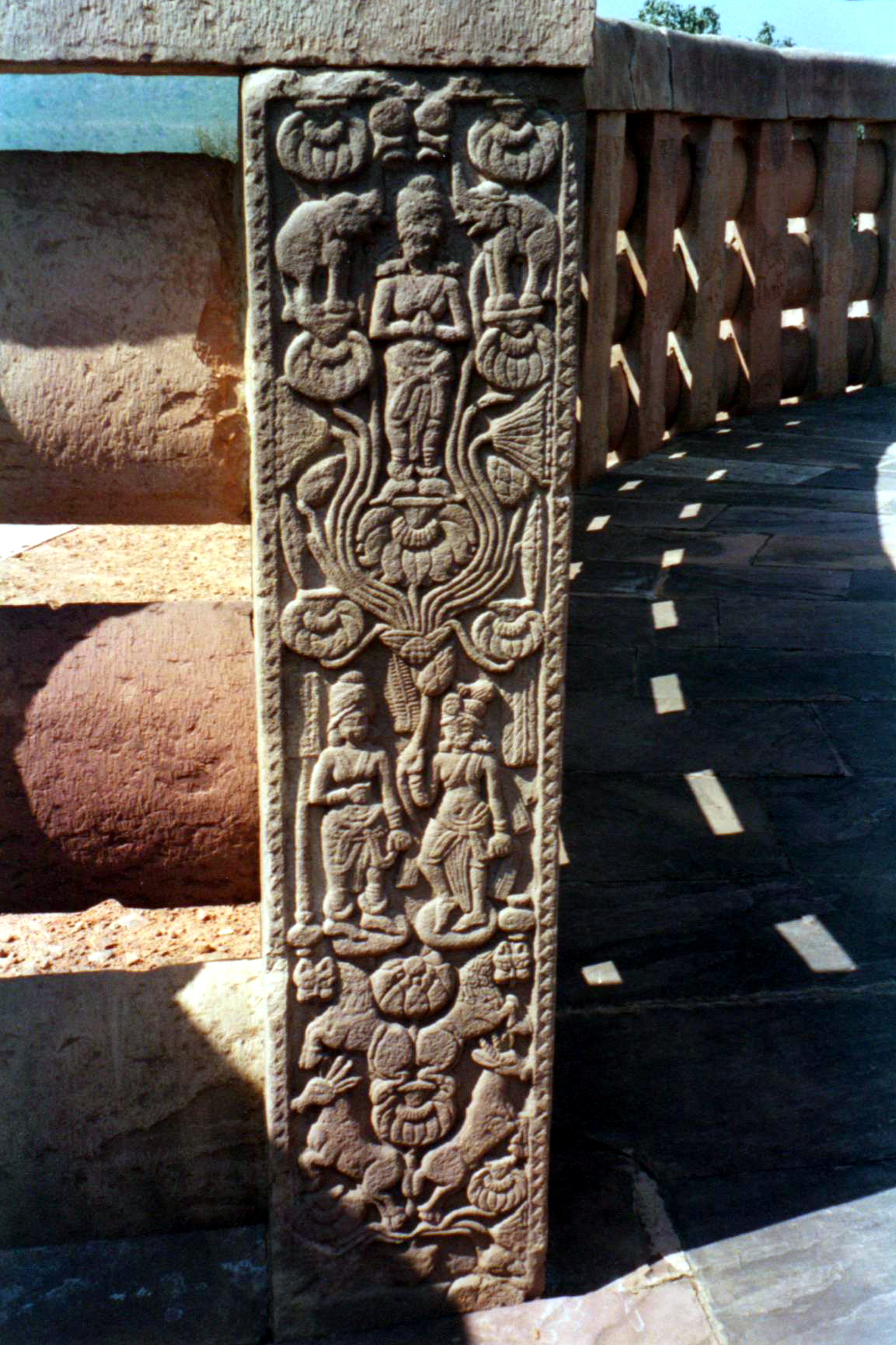
Yaksha couple standing on lotus leaves, the male (sic) holding a lotus bud and posed in shalabhanjika

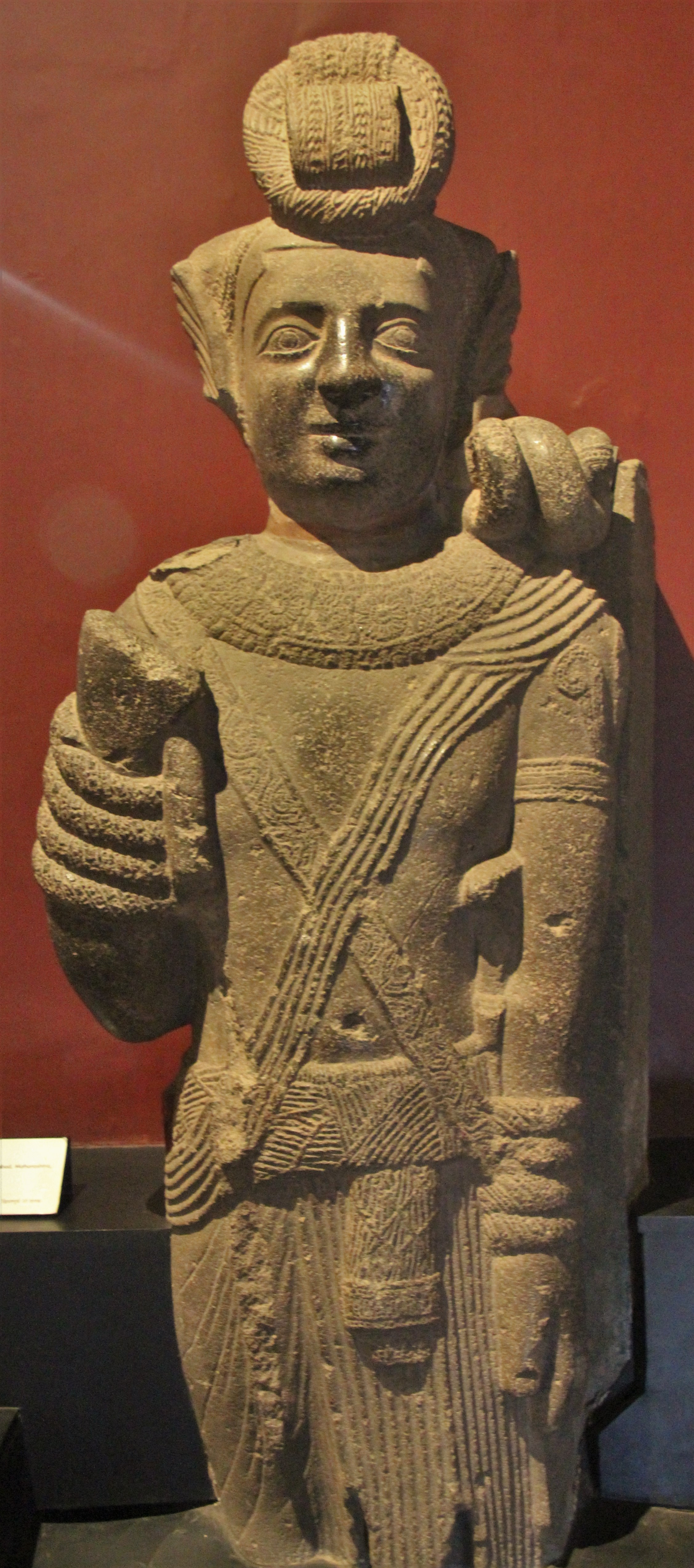
Dvarapala Yaksha made of basalt. Found in Buddhist cave (Pitalkhora), 2nd century CE. Prince of Wales Museum

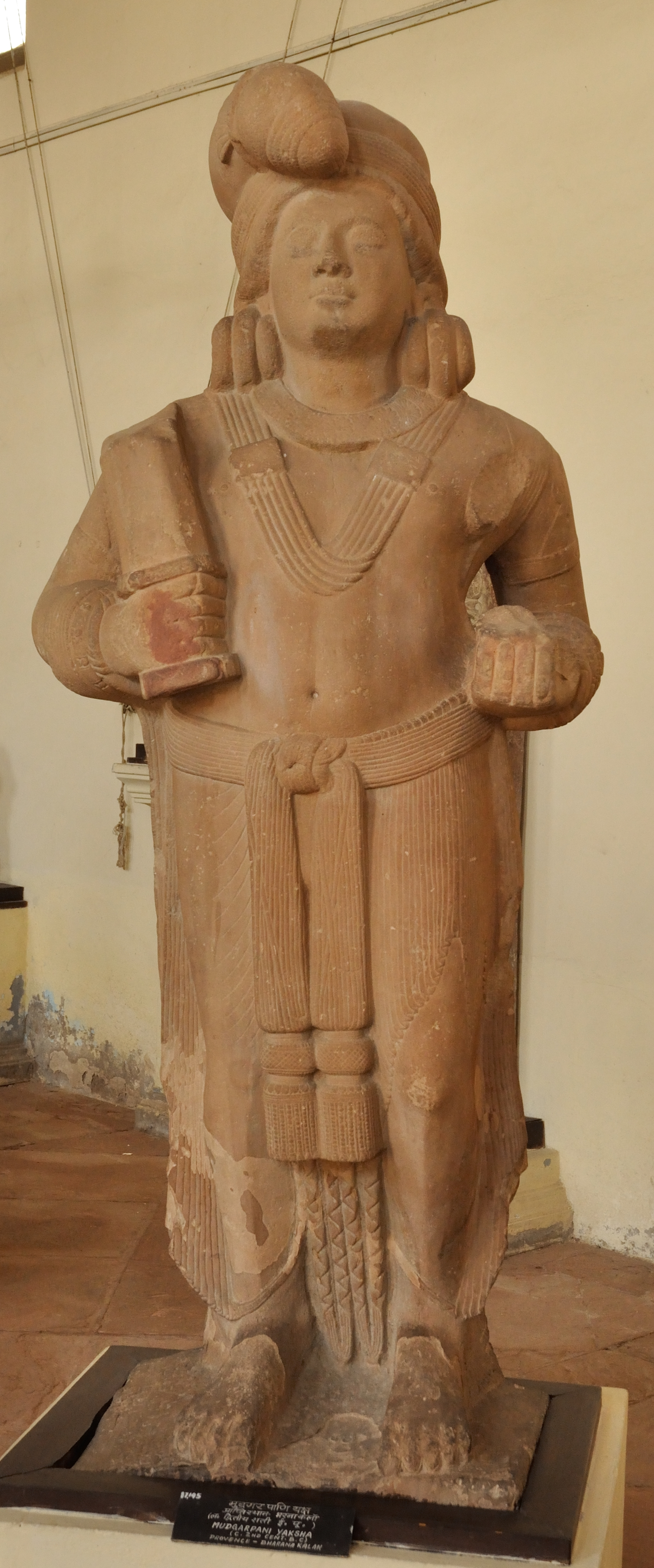
Mudgarpani Yaksha, 2nd century BCE, Bharnakalan, Mathura Museum

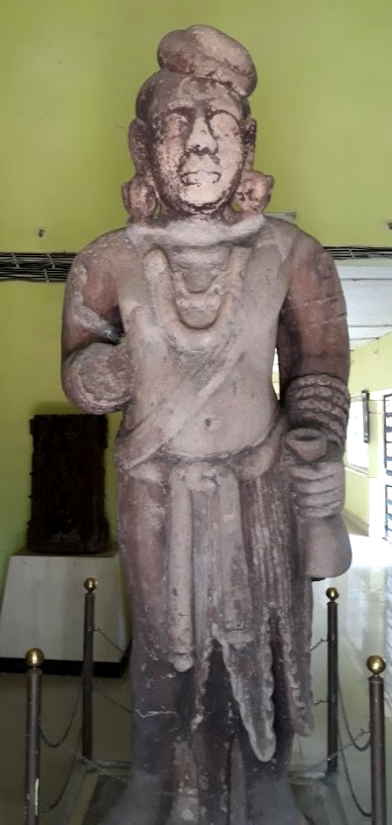
Vidisha Yaksha, 2nd century BCE, Vidisha Museum

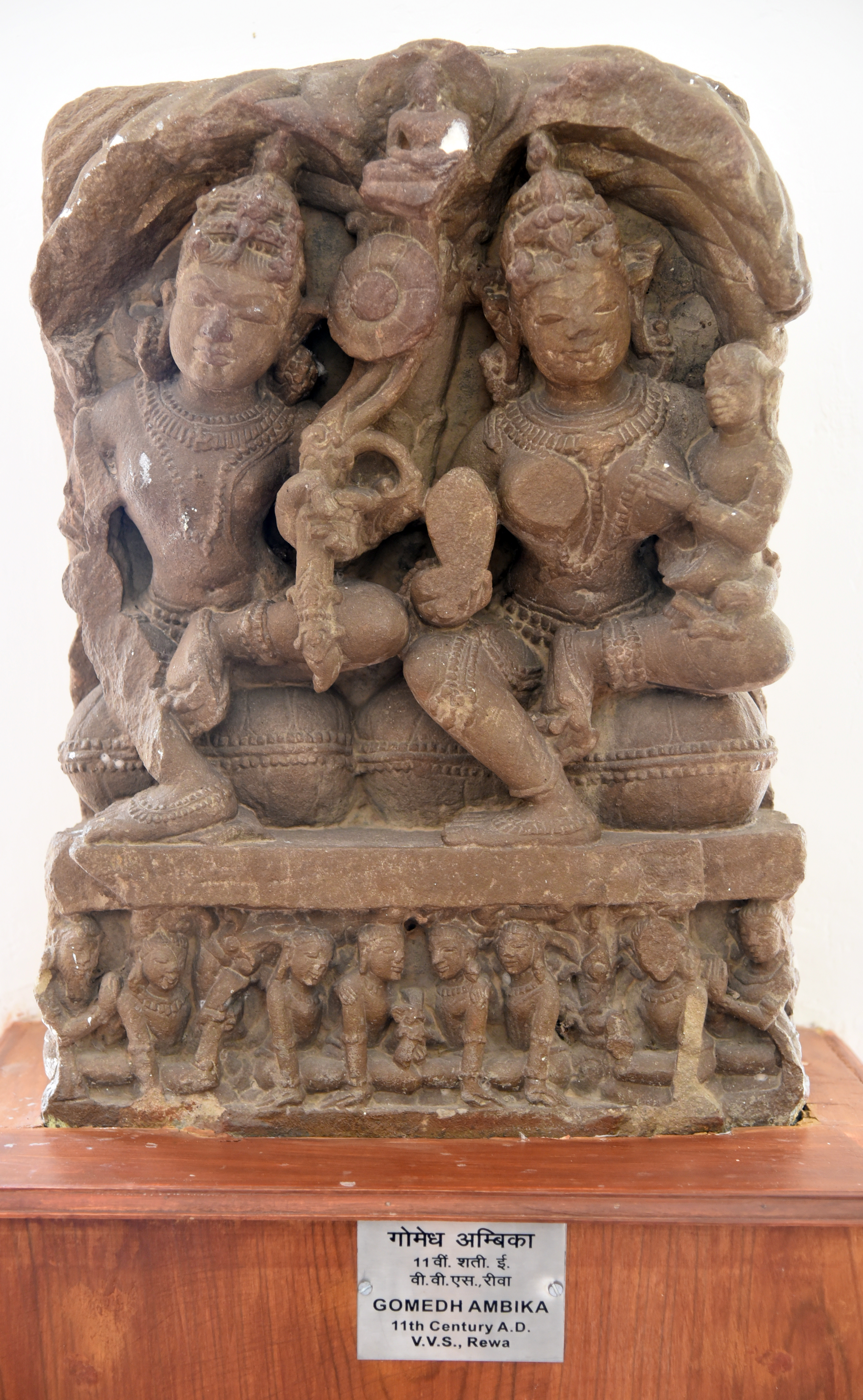
Gomedh and Ambika, 11th century, Maharaja Chhatrasal Museum

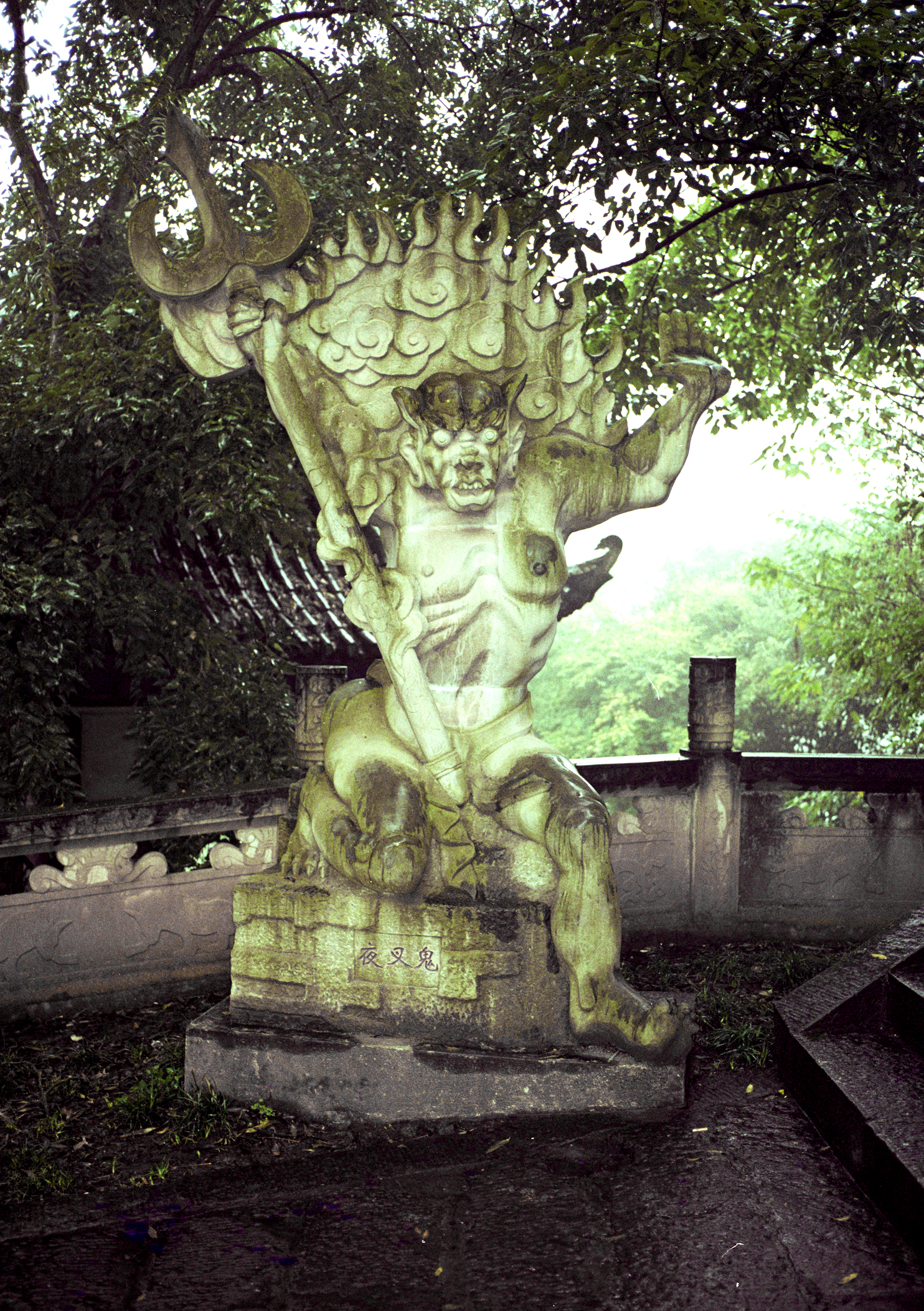
Carving of a yaksha (夜叉)

== See also ==
- Dharanendra
- Dwarf (mythology)
- Gnome
- Jambhala
- Jinn
- Kubera
- List of Yakshas
- Manibhadra
- Nalakuvara
- Ogre
- Pañcika
- Pygmy (Greek mythology)
- Shedim
- Sthunakarna
- Suketu
- Vaiśravaṇa
- Vidyadhara
- Vajrapani
- Yaksha kingdom
- Yakshini
- Yaksha Prashna

== Sources ==
- Dictionary of Hindu Lore and Legend (ISBN 0-500-51088-1) by Anna Dhallapiccola
