= Mudgarpani =

Yaksha deity

"Mudgarpani" Yaksha
Mathura, 100 BCE
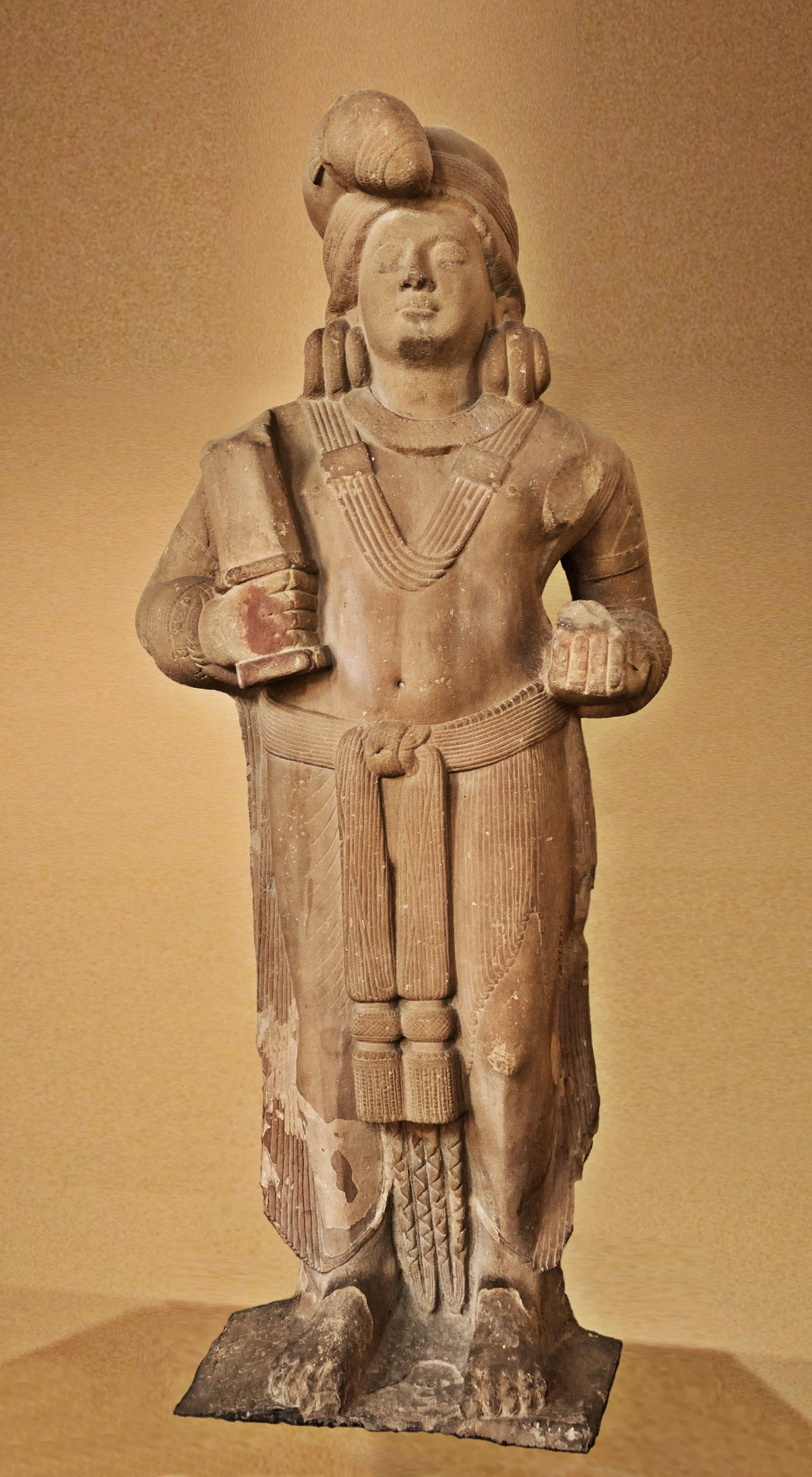
Mudgarpani ("Mace-holder") Yaksha from Bharana Kalan, northwest of Mathura. Art of Mathura, 100 BCE. This colossal statue in the round is 1.96 meters tall. The right hand holds a mudgar, the left hand used to support a small standing devotee or child joining hands in prayer. Mathura Museum, GMM 87.145

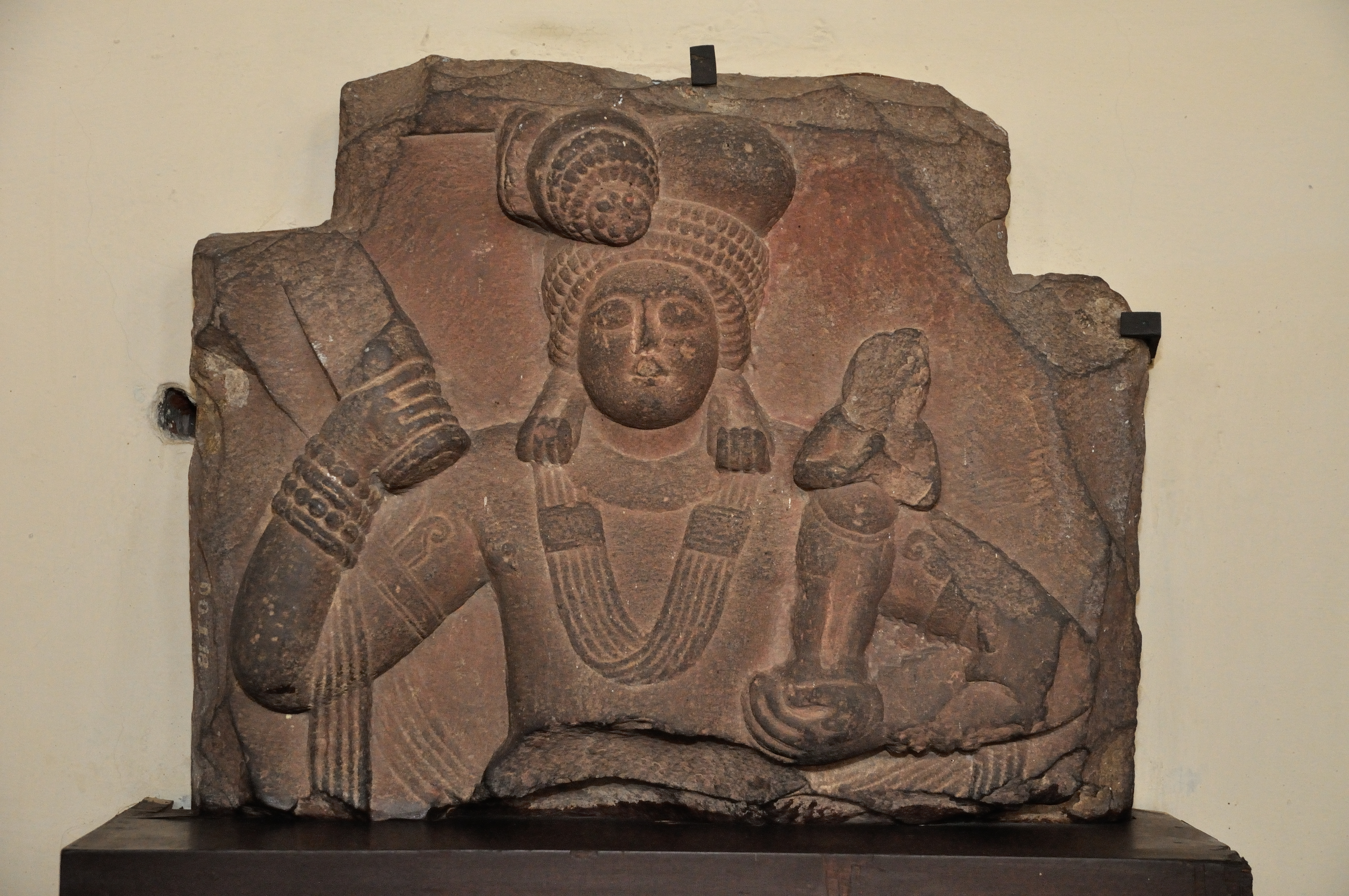
Relief of a similar Mudgarpani Yaksha holding mudgar and child or small worshipper in anjali mudra. Art of Mathura, 100 BCE.

Mudgarpani (Sanskrit: मुद्गरपाणि, romanized: Mudgarapāṇi) was a Yaksha deity in ancient India. His name means "Mudgar-holder", the Mudgar being an ancient form of heavy club, usually made of wood, but it can also be made of iron.

== Yaksha ==
Yakshas seem to have been the object of an important cult in the early periods of Indian history, many of them being known such as Kubera, king of the Yakshas, Manibhadra or Mudgarpani. The Yakshas are a broad class of nature-spirits, usually benevolent, but sometimes mischievous or capricious, connected with water, fertility, trees, the forest, treasure and wilderness, and were the object of popular worship. Many of them were later incorporated into Buddhism, Jainism or Hinduism.

== Sculptures ==
Some of the earliest works of art of the Mathura school of art are the Yakshas, monumental sculptures of earth divinities that have been dated to the 2nd-1st century BCE. Yakshas became the focus of the creation of colossal cultic images, typically around 2 meters or more in height, which are considered as probably the first Indian anthropomorphic productions in stone. Although few ancient Yaksha statues remain in good condition, the vigor of the style has been applauded, and expresses essentially Indian qualities. They are often pot-bellied, two-armed and fierce-looking. The Yashas are often depicted with weapons or attributes, such as the Yaksha Mudgarpani.

=== Mudgarpani ("Mace-holder") Yaksha from Bharana Kalan ===
A statue of Mudgarpani ("Mace-holder") Yaksha from Bharana Kalan, visible in the Mathura Museum, is dated to circa 100 BCE. It was discovered in Bharana Kalan, 32 kilometers northwest of Mathura. In the right hand he holds a mudgar mace, and in the left hand he used to hold the figure of a small standing devotee or child joining hands in prayer.

The inscription in Brahmi script on the base of the statue is in very bad condition, but has been partly deciphered. Some parallels with the contemporary Agnipani statue, probably dedicated by the same person, also helped interpretation:

amatyena prati[har](e)[na]...
(?)[jayagh](o)[s](ena).....[to]prai
.......(no)

"...by Jayaghosa, the minister in charge of the gate-keepers (?)..."

A relief in the Mathura Museum also shows a similar Mudgarpani, dated to the same period, but with clearer attributes: especially the figure of a small standing devotee or child joining hands in prayer is much more visible.

=== Style ===
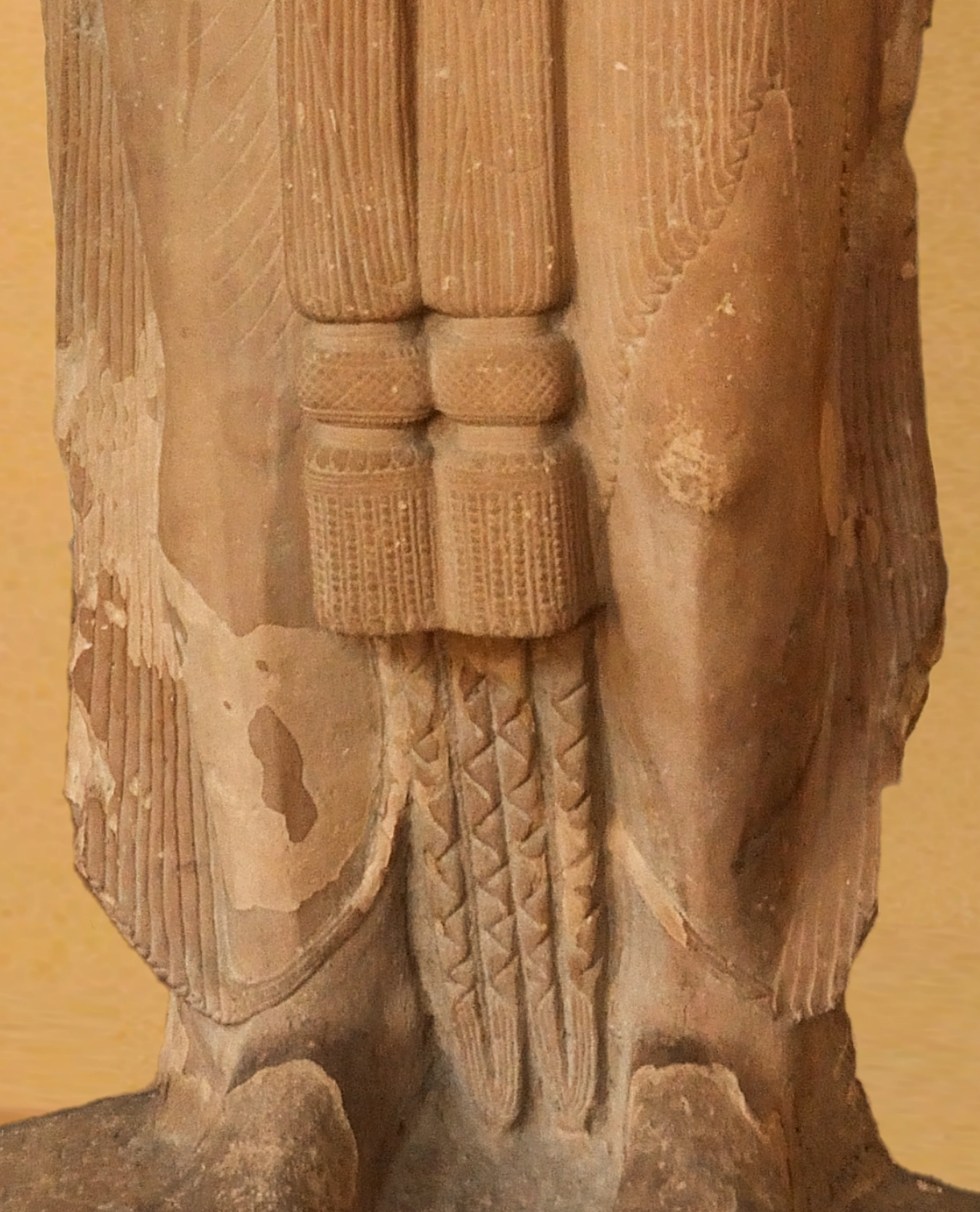
Detail of the "Hellenistic" drapery.

It is often suggested that the style of the colossal Yaksha statuary had an important influence on the creation of later divine images and human figures in India. The female equivalent of the Yakshas were the Yakshinis, often associated with trees and children, and whose voluptuous figures became omnipresent in Indian art. A relief is also known from the Mathura Museum, which shown the Mudgarpani with the same attributes.

Some Hellenistic influence, such as the geometrical folds of the drapery or the contraposto stance of the statues, has been suggested. According to John Boardman, the hem of the dress in the monumental early Yaksha statues is derived from Greek art. Describing the drapery of one of these statues, John Boardman writes: "It has no local antecedents and looks most like a Greek Late Archaic mannerism", and suggests it is possibly derived from the Hellenistic art of nearby Bactria where this design is known. Under the Indo-Greeks, the cult of the Yakshas may also have been associated with the Bacchic cult of Dionysos.

In the production of colossal Yaksha statues carved in the round, which can be found in several locations in northern India, the art of Mathura is considered as the most advanced in quality and quantity during this period.

== Stories and later history ==
An ancient Jain story named the Antagadadasao tell the story of a man named Ajjunaka who was worshipping the image of the "Yaksa who held a mace", when he was attacked by five bandits, an event which shaked is devotion to the Yashka. Afterwards the Yaksa possessed Ajjunaka, giving him the strength to kill the five bandits.

Nowadays, for training purposes when using Indian clubs, one or two wooden gada ("mudgar"), reaching up to 70 kilograms in weight, can be used: they can be swung behind the back in several different ways; this is particularly useful for building grip strength and shoulder endurance.

== Examples ==
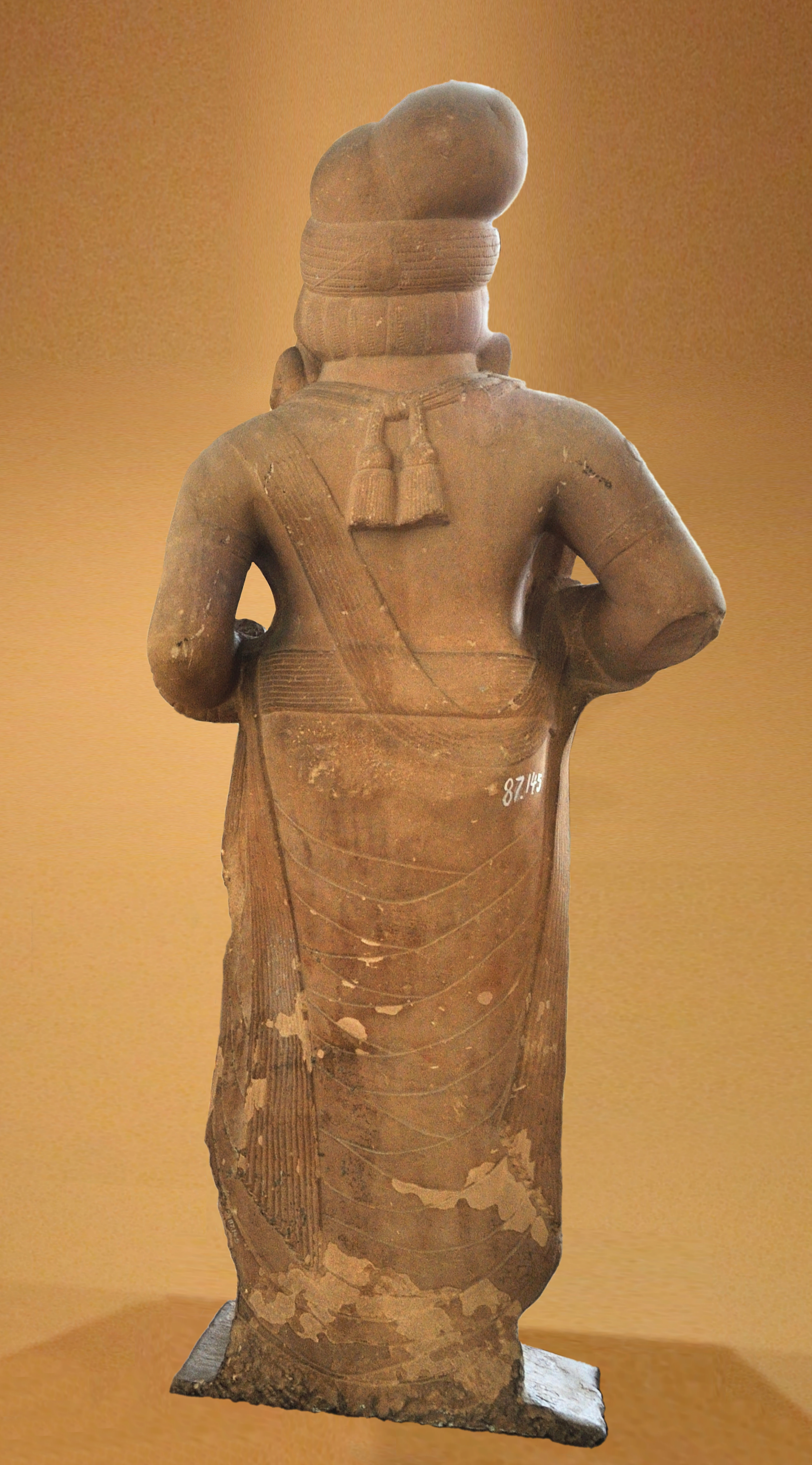
Mudgarpani Yaksha (rear view).

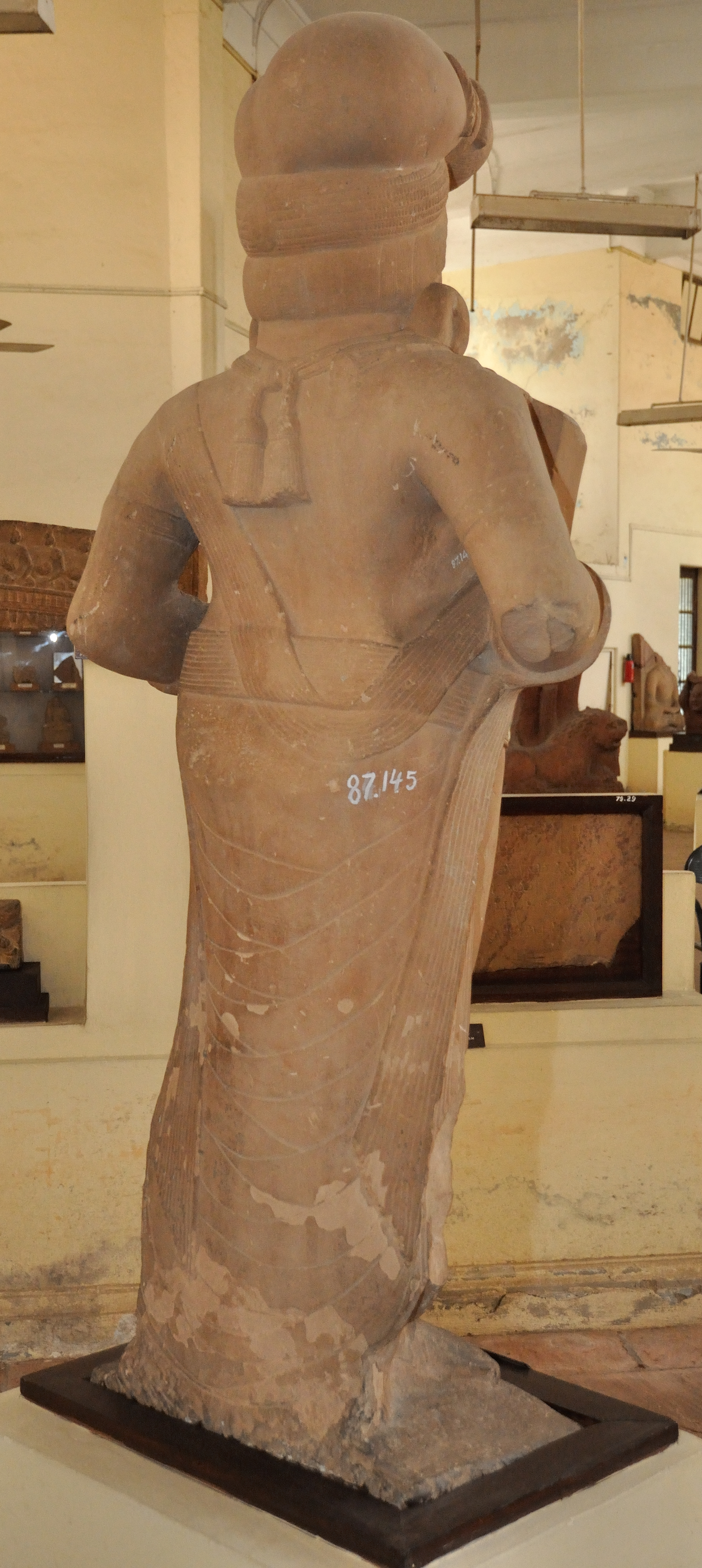
Mudgarpani Yaksha (3/4).

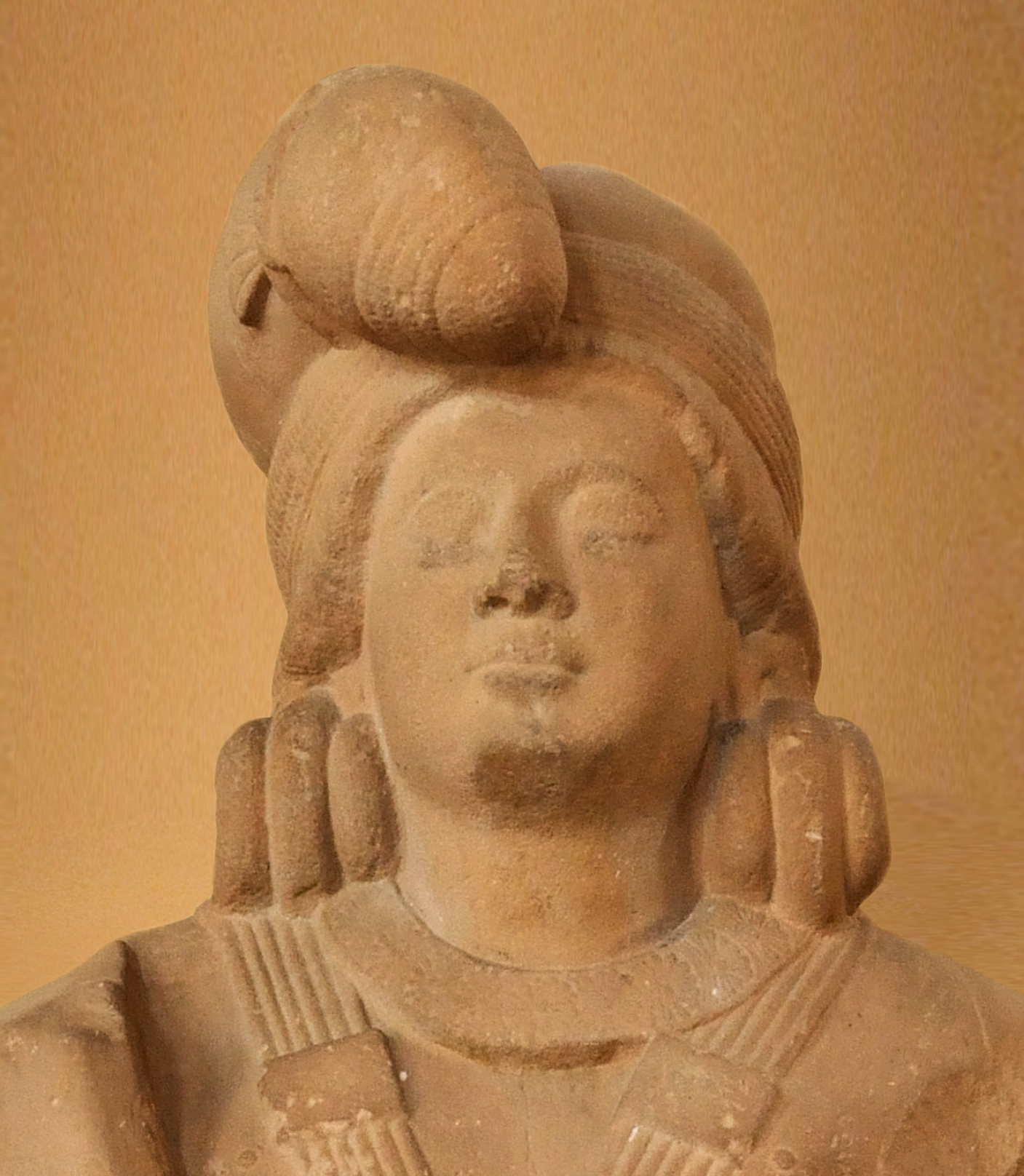
Portrait of the Mudgarpani Yaksha.

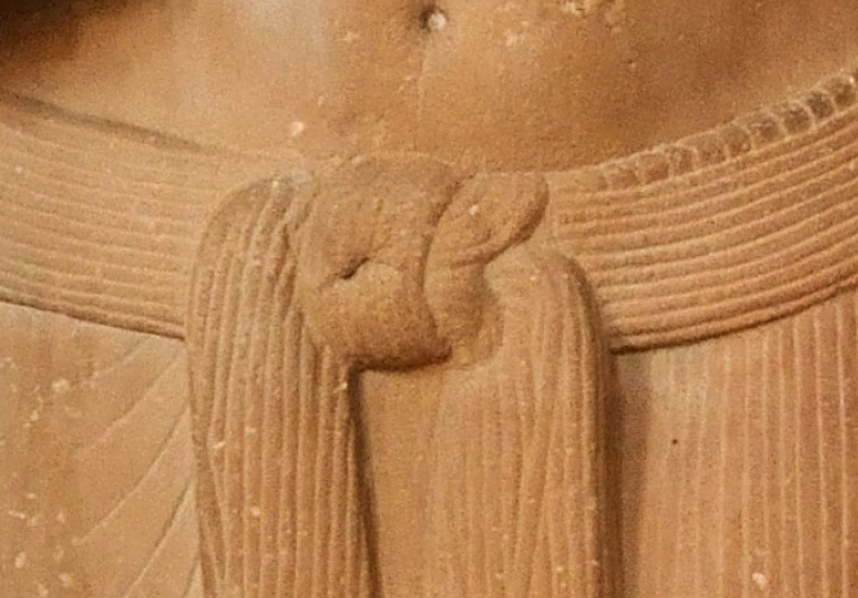
Detail of the "Herakles" knot.

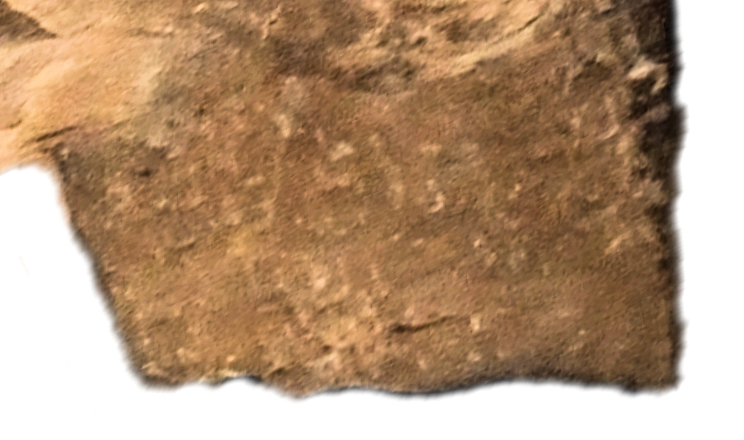
Mudgarpani pedestal inscription in Brahmi
