= Parkham, Uttar Pradesh =

Parkham
- Village
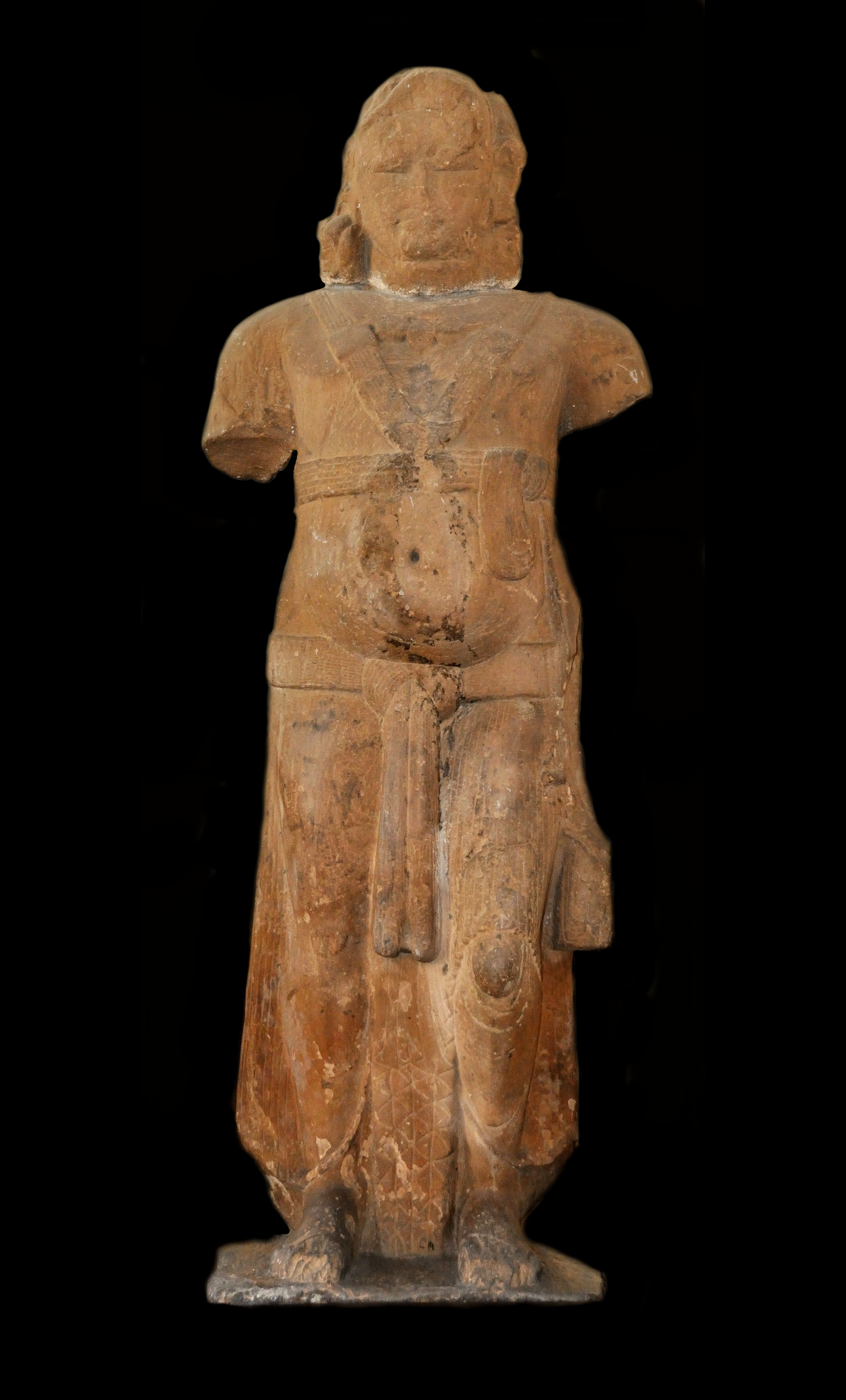
- The Parkham Yaksha

- Location within India Location within Uttar Pradesh
- Coordinates: 27.287358°N 77.717414°E
- Country: India
- State: Uttar Pradesh
- District: Mathura

Government
  - Body: Gram panchayat

Parkham is a village in Uttar Pradesh, India, and about 20 kilometers south of Mathura. It is well known for the discovery of an ancient and monumental Yaksha statue, thought to be dating to the 3rd century BCE based on the Brahmi inscription on its pedestal. Based in stylistic analysis however, it could be 2nd century or 1st century BCE.
